= The Count of Crow's Nest =

1896 short story by Willa Cather

- Short story by Willa Cather
- Country: United States
- Language: English
- Genre: Short story

Publication
- Published in: Home Monthly
- Publication type: Women's magazine
- Publication date: 1896

"The Count of Crow's Nest" is a short story by Willa Cather. It was first published in Home Monthly in October 1896.

== Plot summary ==
At the Crow's Nest, a boarding house, Count de Koch and Harold Buchanan talk about literature. Once, Harold shows a book he has, with what he hopes to be Lola Montez and Ludwig I of Bavaria's signatures. The Count takes out letters of his by these two historical figures, only to prove that it is not the latter's signature, although it is Lola's. The Count's daughter comes in and says these letters should be published. She makes fun of her father's superseded aristocratic stance, and says she would lean towards the bourgeoisie. The two men agree to see her sing sometime later.

After her performance, which Harold deemed to be very poor, the Count leaves and Harold is invited to dinner with Tony and she. Then, she asks him to collect her father's letters and edit them into a book, to make money. He refuses, and is shocked by her mercenariness.

Later, the Count walks into his friend's room in the middle of the night as his letters have vanished. They both go to Helena's and eventually gets them back. The Count expresses grave despair at his daughter's lack of honour, the end of the aristocracy.

== Characters ==
- Harold Buchanan, out of college and looking for a job.
- Count de Koch
- a prima donna
- a reviewer, failed novelist
- Helena de Koch, the Count's daughter. She is a singer by profession.
- Tony, a tenor

== Allusions to other works ==
- Literature is mentioned through William Makepeace Thackeray, Norse mythology (especially Asgard, Honoré de Balzac's Pere Goriot, Andrew Lang's appreciation of Edgar Allan Poe as 'a gentleman among canaille' in Letters to Dead Authors, Théophile Gautier's La Morte Amoureuse and Fortunio, François Rabelais, Greek mythology (with Ares and Eros) William Shakespeare's Hamlet, Jean-Jacques Rousseau's Confessions, and Mary Shelley's Frankenstein.
- Music is mentioned through Nellie Melba, Felix Mendelssohn, and Joseph Haydn.
- Painting is mentioned through Anthony van Dyck.

== Allusions to actual history ==
- The story is set before the World's Columbian Exposition.
- Historical figures such as Beatrice Cenci, Empress Eugenie, Lola Montez, Ludwig I of Bavaria, Joséphine de Beauharnais, Napoleon, Julius Caesar, and Nicholas I of Russia are mentioned.
- William Tell, a legendary figure, is also mentioned.

== Literary significance and criticism ==
The Count of Crow's Nest was influenced by Anthony Hope's 1894 novel The Prisoner of Zenda, which Cather liked a lot. Others have also pointed out the influence of John Esten Cooke's 1880 The Virginia Bohemians.

The story has been deemed Jamesian.
