= Ohio State Route 291 =

State highway in Cuyahoga County, Ohio, US

State Route 291

Route information
- Maintained by ODOT
- Length: 4.14 mi (6.66 km)
- Existed: 1951–present

Major junctions
- South end: Fowles Road in Middleburg Heights
- North end: SR 17 in Brook Park

Location
- Country: United States
- State: Ohio
- Counties: Cuyahoga

Highway system
- Ohio State Highway System; Interstate; US; State; Scenic
← SR 290	→ SR 292

State Route 291 (SR 291) is a 4.14-mile-long (6.66 km) north–south state highway in the northeastern quadrant of the U.S. state of Ohio. The southern terminus of the highway is at a T-intersection with Fowles Road in Middleburg Heights, nearly 0.50 miles (0.80 km) west of where Fowles Road meets U.S. Route 42. Its northern terminus is at a signalized T-intersection with SR 17 on the border between Brook Park and Cleveland, immediately west of where SR 17 passes underneath Interstate 71 south of Interstate 480.

== Route description ==
All of SR 291 runs through the western portion of Cuyahoga County. The highway begins at a T-intersection with Fowles Road in the Cleveland suburb of Middleburg Heights. SR 291 is a two-lane roadway that runs in parallel to I-71 approximately 0.25 miles (0.40 km) to the east. Heading north, the highway with houses on the west side and Woodvale Cemetery on the east side. After crossing the CSX railroad tracks, the route enters into a commercial district, with some woods aligning the west side of the roadway for a short distance. SR 291 widens to five lanes (two lanes per direction plus a center turn lane) as it hits the signalized intersection it has with Bagley Road, which meets I-71 at its Exit 235 just to the east. Continuing north, the highway continues amidst a number of commercial businesses. At the Englewood Drive traffic signal, SR 291 loses the center turn lane, and becomes a four-lane undivided roadway. The state highway next meets Sheldon Road at a signalized intersection, at which point it narrows to two lanes, and enters Brook Park. Through this stretch, SR 291 traverses a primarily residential area. It next arrives at a traffic signal with Holland Road, then continues north. SR 291 widens to four lanes just south of where it meets Snow Road at a partial interchange just west of Exit 237 off of I-71 that features direct access from SR 291 to eastbound Snow Road, and from westbound Snow Road to SR 291. After passing through the interchange, the route crosses another set of CSX railroad tracks, then merges with Five Points Road at a somewhat complex intersection that permits completion of the remaining maneuvers between SR 291 and Snow Road that were not possible at the interchange. Bending to the northeast through that intersection, SR 291 curves back to the north as it arrives at the signalized T-intersection with Hummel Road. The highway is a five-lane roadway from this point as it passes along the east side of Ford Motor Company Cleveland Engine plant en route to its northern terminus at a signalized T-intersection with SR 17 on the border between Brook Park and Cleveland.

SR 291 is not included as a part of the National Highway System.

== History ==
The SR 291 designation was established in 1951. It has utilized the same routing through the southern Cleveland suburbs of Middleburg Heights and Brook Park throughout its lifespan.

== Major intersections ==
The entire route is in Cuyahoga County.

Location	mi	km	Destinations	Notes
Middleburg Heights	0.00	0.00	Fowles Road to US 42	Southern terminus
Middleburg Heights	0.90	1.45	Bagley Road to I-71	
Brook Park	3.00	4.83	Snow Road east to I-71	Interchange; eastbound entrance and westbound exit to/from Snow Road
Brook Park	3.06	4.92	Snow Road west – Hopkins Airport	Interchange; access via Five Points Road
Brook Park–Cleveland line	4.14	6.66	SR 17 (Brookpark Road) – Hopkins Airport	Northern terminus
1.000 mi = 1.609 km; 1.000 km = 0.621 mi: Incomplete access
