= The Princess Baladina – Her Adventure =

1896 short story by Willa Cather

"The Princess Baladina"
- Short story by Charles Douglass (Willa Cather)
- Country: United States
- Language: English
- Genre: Short story

Publication
- Published in: Home Monthly
- Publication type: Women's magazine
- Publication date: 1896

"The Princess Baladina" is a short story by Willa Cather. It was first published in Home Monthly in 1896 under the pseudonym of Charles Douglass.

== Plot introduction ==
Punished for being naughty, the Princess Baladina runs off to find a wizard and a Prince.

== Plot summary ==
The Princess Baladina has been punished for scratching and biting the nurse, and throwing a precious present from her father into the moat. She is not attending a court ball because of that. The next day she has breakfast and decides to run off and ask a wizard to put a spell upon her so that a prince will come and set her free, take her away from her family. She chances upon shepherds, and a miller's son takes her to a local wizard. He says he cannot do it but they should go and visit another wizard. The latter says he cannot do what she wants because the prince would then kill him, and also it is likely no prince will come at all; she needs to find a prince first. The Princess and the miller's son then go and look for a prince; they ask a couple of unassuming figures and finally chance upon a prince, who curtly makes fun of them. The Princess comes to the conclusion that for being so kind, the miller's son deserves to be a prince. However, the King and his retinue walk into them and gives him a gold coin to shoo him away. The Princess weeps and the miller's son wishes there were a prince for her.

== Characters ==
- The Princess Baladina
- The miller's son
- Lean Jack, a wizard.
- The fat wizard
- The King and his retinue.
