= Ardessa =

1918 short story by Willa Cather

- Short story by Willa Cather

Text available at Wikisource
- Country: United States
- Language: English
- Genre: Short story

Publication
- Published in: Century
- Publication type: Illustrated monthly magazine
- Publication date: May 1918

"Ardessa" is a short story by Willa Cather. It was first published in Century in May 1918.

== Plot summary ==
An uppity woman, Ardessa, walks into the offices of "The Outcry", a weekly magazine. Later, she tells off Becky for her shoddy jobs, although it could be said she is bullying her. Miss Kalski gives her tickets for a show and Ardessa only lets her off because Mr Henderson will agree. Ardessa then goes on holiday and gets Miss Milligan to do her job whilst she is away. However, Marcus finds out Becky could be doing a better job and gets her to do it instead. When Ardessa is back, she is told to move to the business department, where she is humbled by Miss Kalski and Mr Henderson.

== Characters ==
- The receptionist, an older man.
- Miss Ardessa Devine
- Marcus O'Mally, the proprietor and editor of "The Outcry", a national weekly. He comes from Goldfield, Nevada and owns a silver-mine in South Dakota.
- Mr Gerrard, a journalist.
- James, an office boy.
- Becky, the copyist.
- Miss Rena Kalski, a woman who works in the business department.
- Isaac Tietelbaum, Becky's father. He is a tailor. He has eight children.
- Mr Henderson
- Miss Milligan

== Allusions to actual history ==
- Napoleon and Benjamin Disraeli are mentioned.

== Allusions to other works ==
- The performing arts are mentioned with Sarah Bernhardt.
- Literature is mentioned with William Shakespeare and Francis Bacon.

== Literary significance and criticism ==
The story was written by Cather solely to earn money while she was writing My Ántonia. It was informed by her own journalistic experience at McClure's and her subsequent 'caustic' stance towards muckrakers. It was also influenced by her work for the Home Monthly and the Pittsburgh Leader.

Critics have added that she might have identified with either Becky or Kalski. The story has been construed as an attack on the American standardization that Cather hated.
