= Wallaces Farmer =

Agricultural newspaper based in Des Moines, Iowa

- Categories: Trade magazine
- Frequency: Monthly
- Founded: 1892
- Company: Farm Progress
- Country: United States
- Based in: Des Moines, Iowa
- Language: English
- Website: www.wallacesfarmer.com
- ISSN: 0043-0129

Wallaces Farmer is an agricultural newspaper based in Des Moines, Iowa. It is owned by media company Informa and operates as part of the company's Farm Progress division.

== History ==
The newspaper's lineage can be traced back to the 1850s and two separate publications, the Northwestern Farmer and Horticultural Journal and the Iowa Farmer and Horticulturist, which merged in 1861 to become The Iowa Homestead and Northwestern Farmer; the name eventually shortened to The Iowa Homestead. Henry Wallace became editor of The Iowa Homestead in 1883, and James M. Pierce purchased the paper in 1885. Conflicts between the two over the paper's philosophy caused Wallace to leave. Wallace's sons had been publishing The Farm and Dairy since 1893, and he joined in its operation; the Wallace name was added in 1895, and the publication's name was shorted to Wallaces' Farmer in 1898. The Iowa Homestead and Wallaces' Farmer were bitter rivals, and Wallace family ultimately bought out The Iowa Homestead in 1929. Henry's son, Henry Cantwell Wallace, and his son, Henry A. Wallace—later a Cabinet secretary and vice president under Franklin Delano Roosevelt—served as editors.

The first issue of the combined Wallaces Farmer and Iowa Homestead came out in October 1929, as the stock market began to crash. The publication faltered, and in 1932 Dante Pierce, son of James M. Pierce, came back as receiver; he purchased the publication at a sheriff's sale in 1935. After Dante Pierce's death in 1955, the publication was sold to the publishers of Prairie Farmer, and the name was shortened to Wallaces Farmer.
