= Ohio Woman's Press Association =

American professional association writers and journalists

The Ohio Woman's Press Association was an American professional association for women writers and journalists.

== History ==
The Ohio Woman’s Press Association was formed in the spring of 1886 by a group of Cleveland women workers in various lines of journalism and literature. Its aim and object were to secure the benefit resulting from organized effort, and also the pleasure and the stimulus of comradeship. Since then, its history has been one of continued interest and growth.

From its beginning, original, published literary work was a requisite to membership, and while the social element held a due place, much time and thought were given to serious study. Several of the papers prepared for, and read at, its meetings found their way into prominent journals. Being distinctively a press association, the custom was inaugurated of gathering, as far as possible, at the close of each year a summary of the published work of its members for the current year. This feature, interesting and helpful at the time, served to preserve a continuous record of the work of the association as a whole.

The annual report for 1890 showed that of the 40 members of the association, eight were editors in charge, or editors of special departments; eleven more had regular connection with newspapers and magazines; twelve were authors, of whom six had published work in that year, and eight had books ready for publication, or in preparation. That year, the various contributions of the members, comprising stories, poems, essays, editorials, serials, historical studies, foreign and home correspondence, had appeared in a list of some 70 newspapers and magazines, covering a territorial extent from Boston to San Francisco, and from Vermont to Georgia. The officers of the association for 1890 were: President, Harriett Ellen Grannis Arey; vice-presidents, Mrs. P. E. Kipp, Cleveland, Mrs. M. E. M. Richardson, Cleveland, Miss Rose Gifford, Ashtabula, Miss Emily Bouton, Toledo, Mrs. Virginia L. Patterson, Bellefountain, Miss Hannah A. Foster, Berea; recording secretary and treasurer, Miss Adela E. Thompson, Cleveland; corresponding secretary, Sarah Elizabeth Bierce, Cleveland.

== Branches ==
Two years after the organization of the association, followed that of the Woman's Press Club of Cincinnati, and in May, 1889, the two hitherto separate societies, while still preserving their distinct individuality, were, as the Cleveland and Cincinnati branch of the Ohio Woman’s Press Association, united in a state organization, of which Arey, of Cleveland, was president, and Alice Williams Brotherton, of Cincinnati, vice-president, a union which has already proved a strong bond between the women writers of northern and southern Ohio, and from which still happier results are expected in the future.

In 1891, the Ohio Woman's Press Association had in its Cincinnati branch over 30 members, nearly all of whom are journalists. The Cleveland branch numbered between 40 and 50, about one-half of whom are authors and one-half journalists.

== Notable people ==
- Harriett Ellen Grannis Arey
- Sarah Elizabeth Bierce
- Mary Hayes Houghton
- Marion A. McBride
- Georgia T. Robertson
- Jenny Terrill Ruprecht
