= Ohio State Route 17 =

State highway in Cuyahoga County, Ohio, US

State Route 17

Route information
- Maintained by ODOT
- Length: 21.04 mi (33.86 km)
- Existed: 1935–present

Major junctions
- West end: SR 10 in North Olmsted
- I-480 in Cleveland; I-480 in Brook Park; US 42 / SR 3 in Cleveland; I-480 in Brooklyn Heights; I-480 in Garfield Heights
- East end: SR 43 in Bedford Heights

Location
- Country: United States
- State: Ohio
- Counties: Cuyahoga

Highway system
- Ohio State Highway System; Interstate; US; State; Scenic
← SR 16	→ SR 18

State Route 17 (SR 17) is an east–west highway in Northeast Ohio running from North Olmsted at State Route 10 to State Route 43 in Bedford Heights. The entire route has been paralleled by Interstate 480 and has junctions with this interstate via numerous cross streets such as Clague Road, Tiedeman Road, and Warrensville Center Road, and also via State Route 94 (State Road) and State Route 14 (Broadway Avenue). It also has two direct junctions with the interstate. State Route 17 provides access to many industrial and commercial areas in this area of Cleveland.

The western terminus of State Route 17 is the intersection of Brookpark Road and Lorain Road (State Route 10) adjacent to Great Northern Mall in North Olmsted. SR 17 follows Brookpark Road east and passes into Fairview Park and then Cleveland as it passes Cleveland Hopkins International Airport. After passing the airport, it enters Brook Park. At West 130th Street, Brookpark Road serves as a border, first between Brook Park and Cleveland, then Brooklyn and Parma, followed by Parma and Cleveland, and finally Brooklyn Heights and Cleveland. As the road crosses into Brooklyn Heights and crossed I-480 it is known as Granger Road, which continues into Independence and Garfield Heights. In Garfield Heights, Granger Road veers to the southeast, while SR 17 continues east onto Libby Road and into Maple Heights. After crossing into Bedford Heights, SR 17 turns to the northeast onto Bartlett Road. At Meuti Drive, just before passes under I-480, it is briefly cosigned with eastbound SR 43 until it meets its eastern terminus at Aurora Road (SR 43).

== History ==
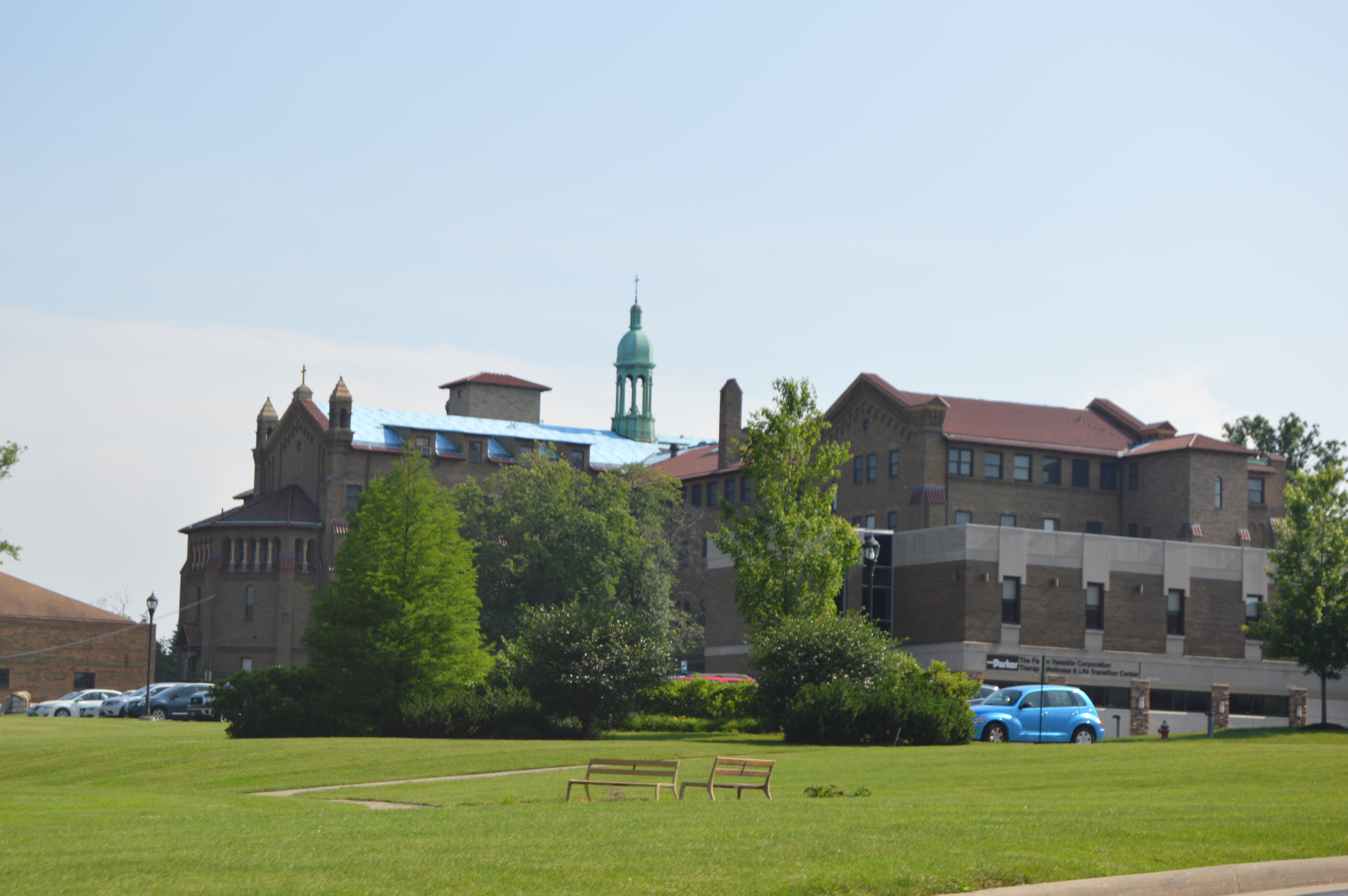
Former convent in Garfield Heights

SR 17 was first signed as SR 43 in 1931, along the entire SR 17 route. SR 17 was commissioned along its current route in 1935, the route went from U.S. Route 20 east to SR 43. In 1938 SR 17 was moved onto Temporary SR 17, between US 20 and east of SR 252, in Brook Park. Temporary SR 17 was removed between 1959 and 1961, moving SR 17 back to its current alignment. In 1976 the section of road between US 20 and SR 10 was decommissioned.

== Major intersections ==
The entire route is in Cuyahoga County.

Location	mi	km	Destinations	Notes
North Olmsted	0.00	0.00	SR 10 (Lorain Road)	
North Olmsted	0.71	1.14	SR 252 (Great Northern Boulevard) to I-480	
Cleveland	3.78	6.08	Grayton Road to I-480 west	Direct eastbound exit from I-480; westbound entrance to I-480 via Grayton Road
Cleveland	4.51	7.26	SR 237 north (Rocky River Drive) to I-90 – Rental Car Return	Western end of OH 237 concurrency
Brook Park	4.59	7.39	SR 237 south (Berea Freeway) – Hopkins Airport, I-X Center	Eastern end of OH 237 concurrency
Brook Park	5.11	8.22	SR 291 south (Engle Road) to I-71	Northern terminus of SR 291
Brook Park	6.63	10.67	I-480 east	Exit 12 on I-480; westbound movements via West 130th Street
Cleveland–Parma line	9.84	15.84	US 42 / SR 3 (Pearl Road)	
Cleveland–Parma line	10.78	17.35	SR 94 (State Road) to I-480	
Cleveland–Parma line	11.57	18.62	SR 176 south (Broadview Road)	Western end of OH 176 concurrency
Cleveland–Parma line	11.82	19.02	SR 176 north – Cleveland	Eastern end of OH 176 concurrency; ramps to Jennings Freeway
Brooklyn Heights	12.28	19.76	I-480 east – Youngstown	Exit 17B on I-480
Valley View	14.51	23.35	SR 21 to I-77	Cloverleaf interchange
Garfield Heights	16.92	27.23	I-480 west	No eastbound exit; exit 22 on I-480
Maple Heights	18.12	29.16	SR 14 (Broadway Avenue)	
Bedford Heights	20.44	32.89	SR 8 (Northfield Road)	
Bedford Heights	20.99	33.78	SR 43 south (Mueti Drive)	Western end of OH 43 concurrency
Bedford Heights	21.04	33.86	SR 43 (Aurora Road) to I-480	Eastern terminus of OH 43 concurrency
1.000 mi = 1.609 km; 1.000 km = 0.621 mi: Concurrency terminus; Incomplete access
