= Bierce =

Bierce is a surname. Notable people with the surname include:

- Ambrose Bierce (1842 – c. 1914), American Civil War soldier, wit and writer
- Lucius V. Bierce (1801–1876), attorney, five term mayor of Akron, Ohio, Commander-in-chief of the Patriot Army of the West during the Canada Patriot War of 1837–1839
- Sarah Elizabeth Bierce, 19th-century American journalist and educator
- Scotty Bierce (1896–1982), American football player
