= Georgia T. Robertson =

American educator and author (1852–1916)

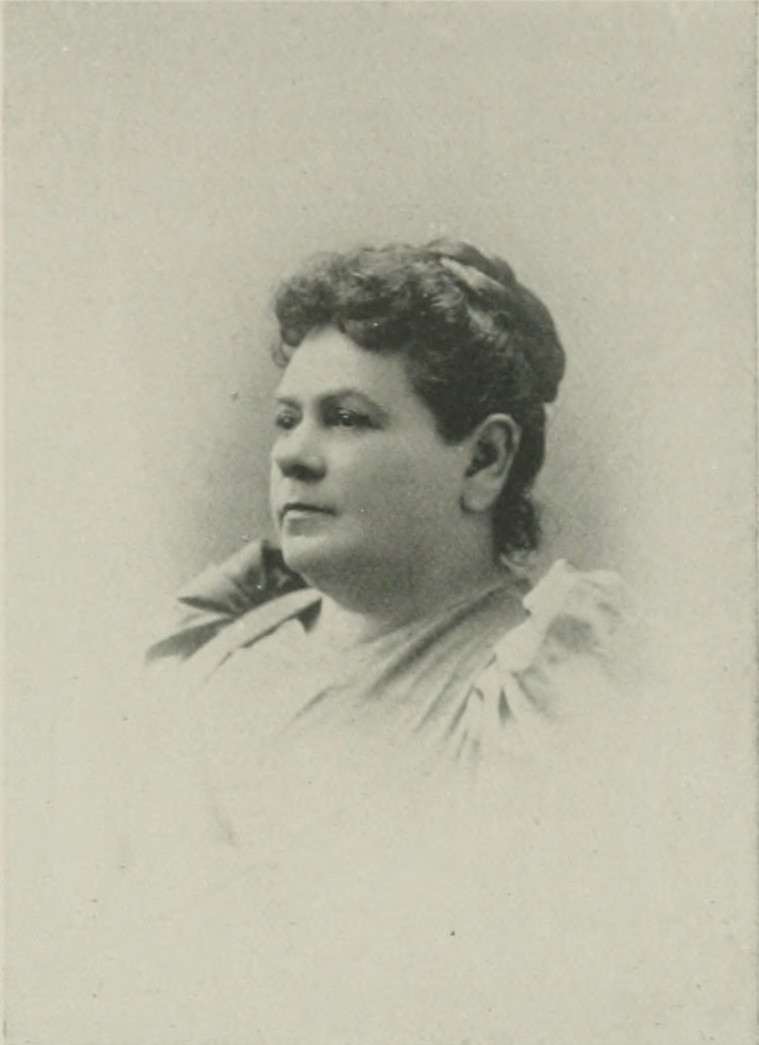
"A Woman of the Century"

Georgianna "Georgia" Marcia Trowbridge Robertson (August 2, 1852 - November 30, 1916) was an educator and author.

== Early life ==
Georgianna "Georgia" Marcia Trowbridge was born in Solon, Ohio, on August 2, 1852. The ancestry of Trowbridge's mother, Lavinia Phelps Missel (1827–1903), reached back to the Guelphs. That of her father, Henry Trowbridge (1830–1921), was recorded in the "Herald's Visitation" as holding Trowbridge Castle, Devonshire, in the time of Edward I of England in the thirteenth century. The name Trowbridge is also frequently found in Revolutionary annals.

== Career ==
At fifteen, Georgia Trowbridge became a teacher in the Ledge district of Twinsburg, Ohio, and two years later passed to wider fields of action, teaching in the graded schools and attending Hiram College. During her life as student and teacher she published various essays and poems. Her writings trended from the first in the direction of ethics, philosophy and nature.

For several years she was an invalid. She recovered her health and was again at work, thinking and writing in the line of social and divine science. She was actively connected with the Ohio Woman's Press Association and various historical, literary, art and social organizations in her city. Her work was sometimes anonymous, but was known over her signature, "Marcia."

== Personal life and family ==
In 1875 Georgia Trowbridge married George A. Robertson (d. 1908), an alumnus of Hiram College and a well-known journalist of Cleveland, Ohio.

Her son, Carl Trowbridge Robertson (1876–1935), a graduated from Harvard in 1898, was a journalist and founder of the Cleveland Morning Recorder. He was an authority on contract bridge, joining the Cleveland Whist Club and playing on its national championship teams in 1902 and 1903. In 1920 he discovered an unknown section of Mammoth Cave National Park, subsequently named Robertson Ave. His son, Donald "Don" Robertson, was a reporter for the Plain Dealer, a columnist for the Cleveland Press, and a novelist best known for "The Greatest Thing since Sliced Bread", a fictional account of the East Ohio Gas disaster.

Georgia T. Robertson died on November 30, 1916, and is buried at Lake View Cemetery, Cleveland.
