= Ohio State Route 237 =

State highway in Cuyahoga County, Ohio, US

State Route 237

Route information
- Maintained by ODOT
- Length: 13.79 mi (22.19 km)
- Existed: 1935–present

Major junctions
- South end: SR 82 in Strongsville
- I-71 / I-480 in Cleveland; SR 17 in Cleveland
- North end: US 6 / US 20 / SR 2 in Lakewood

Location
- Country: United States
- State: Ohio
- Counties: Cuyahoga

Highway system
- Ohio State Highway System; Interstate; US; State; Scenic
← SR 236	→ SR 238

State Route 237 (SR 237) is a nearly 14-mile (23 km) north–south signed route in Cuyahoga County, Ohio. Its southern terminus is at SR 82 in Strongsville, and its northern terminus is in Lakewood where U.S. Route 20 (US 20) joins the US 6 / SR 2 concurrency.

== Route description ==
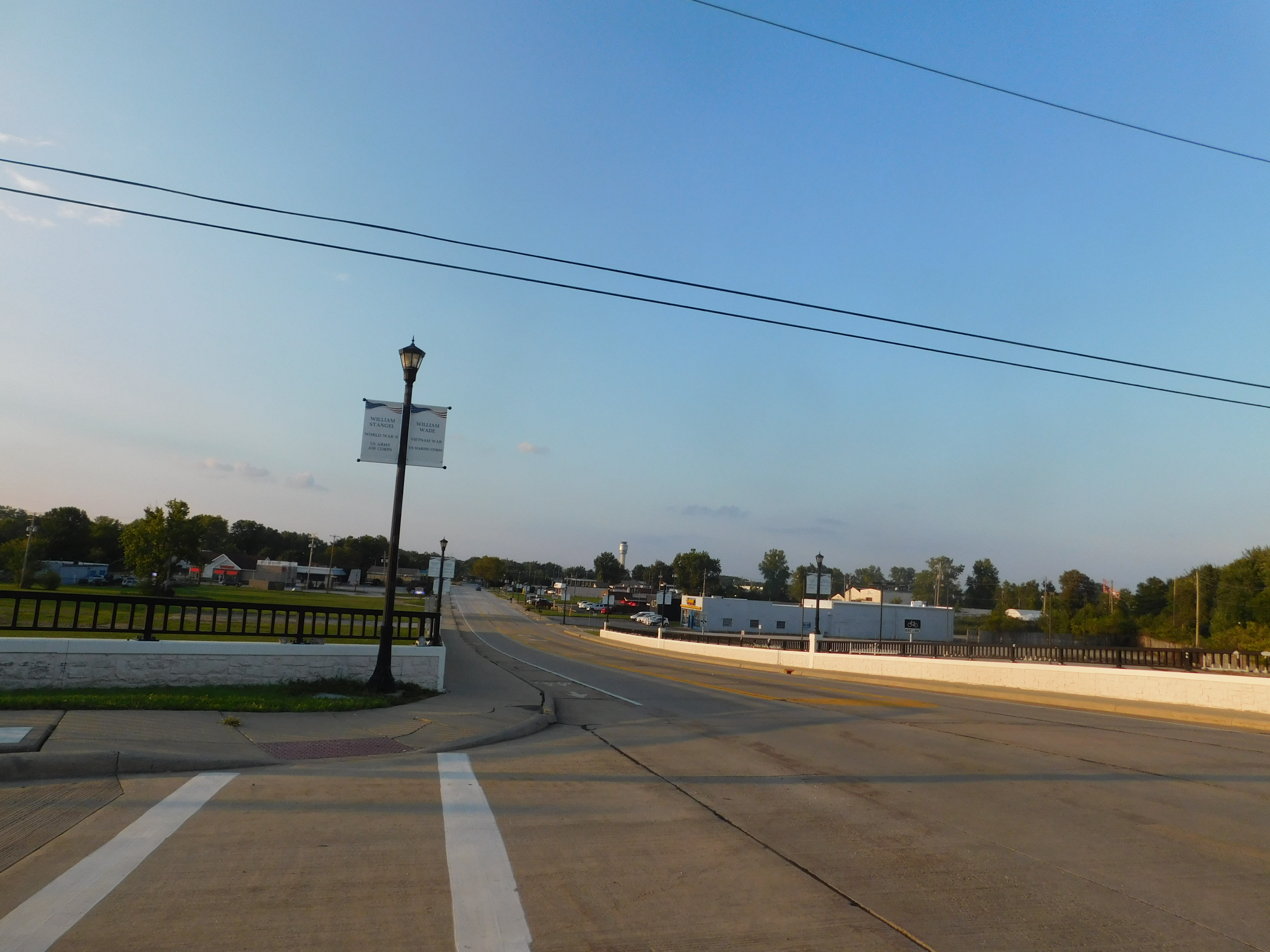
SR 237 northbound in Berea

SR-237 begins at Royalton Road (SR 82) in Strongsville, heading northbound towards Berea as Prospect Road. About four miles in, the route turns eastwards onto Bagley Road in Berea, then north onto Front Street 0.1 miles later.

After continuing on Front Street for about 1 mile, the route makes a slight turn onto North Rocky River Drive, which becomes a freeway as it enters Brook Park after Sheldon Road. This portion of the route, which connects Cleveland Hopkins International Airport to Interstate 480 (I-480) and I-71, is known as the Berea Freeway (or the Airport Freeway).

At the northeast corner of the airport, SR 237 has an interchange with SR 17 (Brookpark Road), I-480, and I-71. In this interchange, SR 237 leaves the Berea Freeway for surface streets, where SR 237 northbound has a short concurrency with SR 17 westbound; the Berea Freeway continues northeast as unsigned County Route 237 and merges into I-71.

North of this interchange, SR 237 proceeds along Rocky River Drive (which is parallel to the Rocky River) until its northern terminus at Clifton Boulevard (US-6).

== History ==
The original route of SR 237 was incorporated into the southern section of Ohio State Route 79. Most of the current routing of SR 237 was originally Ohio State Route 232.

The Berea Freeway by Cleveland Hopkins International Airport was converted from an expressway to freeway between 1983 and 1987.

== Major intersections ==
The entire route is in Cuyahoga County. All exits of the Berea Freeway are unnumbered.

Location	mi	km	Destinations	Notes
Strongsville	0.00	0.00	SR 82 (Royalton Road) / Prospect Road	Southern terminus
Berea	5.59	9.00	Southern end of Berea Freeway (expressway segment)	
Brook Park	6.07– 6.26	9.77– 10.07	IX Center Drive / Aerospace Parkway / Kolthoff Drive	Interchange; southbound exit; northbound exit and entrance; access to the I-X Center
Brook Park	6.36	10.24	Southern end of freeway	
Brook Park	6.66– 7.38	10.72– 11.88	Snow Road – Airport	To I-71 and Hopkins Airport
Cleveland	7.53	12.12	Airport (Cleveland Hopkins International)	Southbound exit via ramp from southbound Berea Freeway (I-71 ramp extension segment); via exit 10 on I-480 westbound
Cleveland	7.72	12.42	I-71 north / I-480 east – Cleveland, Youngstown	Northern end of northbound Berea Freeway concurrency; exit 239 on southbound I-71; northbound exit and southbound entrance
Cleveland	8.03	12.92	Northern end of southbound Berea Freeway concurrency; southbound entrance	
Brook Park	8.03	12.92	SR 17 east (Brookpark Road) to I-480 east	Southern terminus of northbound concurrency with SR 17
Cleveland	8.24	13.26	SR 17 west (Brookpark Road) to I-71 / I-480 east	Northern terminus of northbound concurrency with SR 17
Cleveland	10.53	16.95	SR 10 (Lorain Avenue)	
Lakewood	13.31	21.42	US 6 Alt. (Detroit Avenue)	
Lakewood	13.45	21.65	US 20 west / SR 113 west (Sloane Avenue) / Northwood Avenue	Southern terminus of concurrency with US 20 and unsigned SR 113
Lakewood	13.79	22.19	US 6 / US 20 east / SR 2 / LECT (Clifton Boulevard) / SR 113	Northern terminus of SR 237 and concurrency with US 20; eastern terminus of unsigned SR 113
1.000 mi = 1.609 km; 1.000 km = 0.621 mi: Concurrency terminus; Incomplete access
