= Liverpool Township, Medina County, Ohio =

Township in Ohio, US

- Township
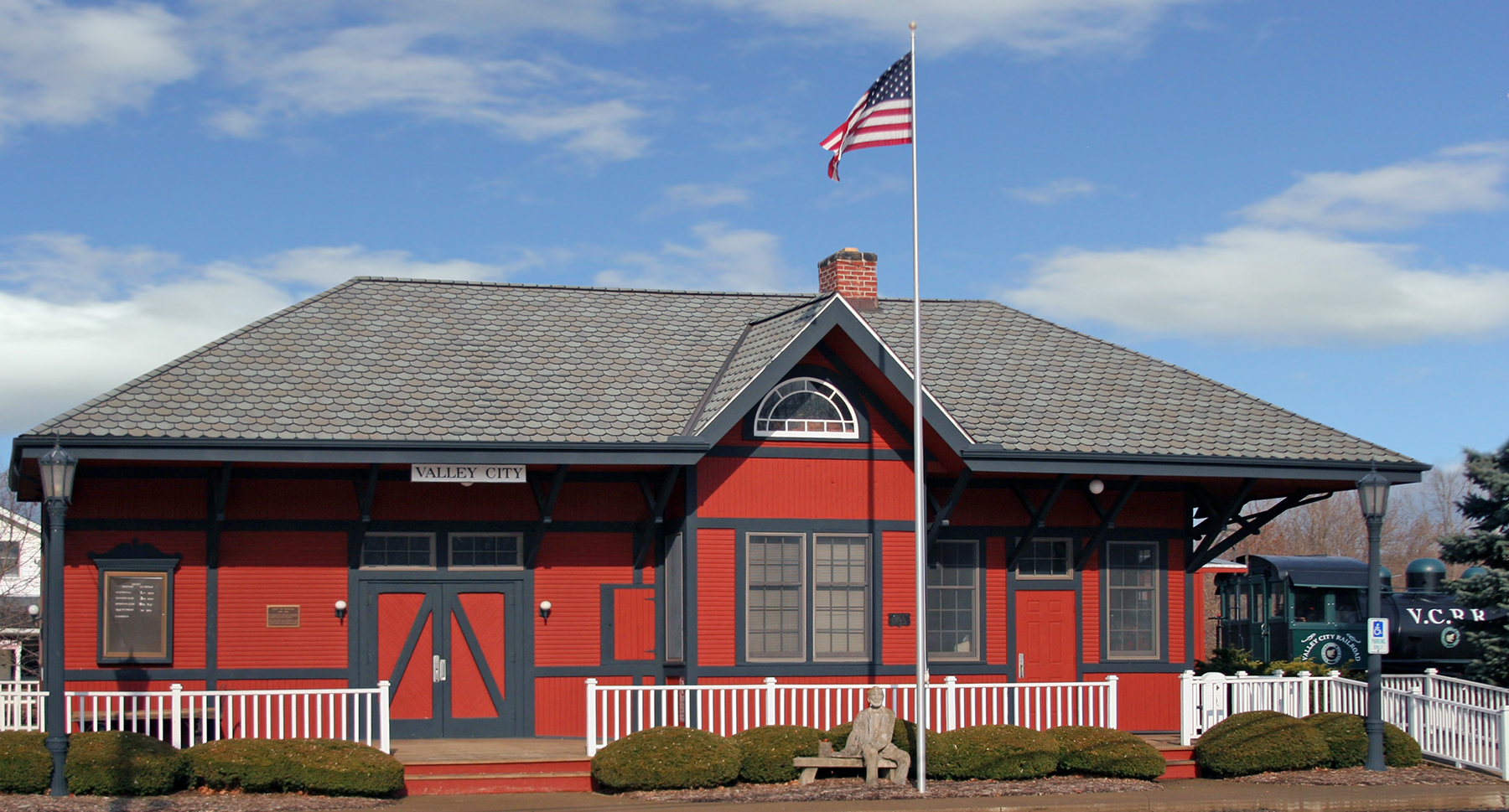
- Restored train depot in Liverpool Township, Ohio

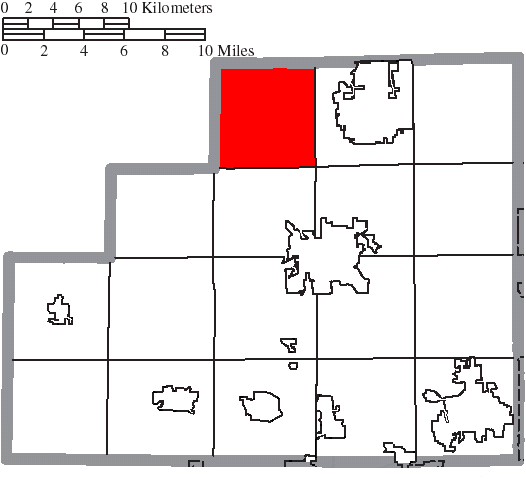
- Location of Liverpool Township in Medina County
- Coordinates: 41°13′51″N 81°55′29″W
- Country: United States
- State: Ohio
- County: Medina

Area
  - Total: 25.9 sq mi (67.0 km^{2})
  - Land: 25.9 sq mi (67.0 km^{2})
  - Water: 0 sq mi (0.0 km^{2})
- Elevation: 889 ft (271 m)

Population (2020)
  - Total: 5,750
  - Density: 222/sq mi (85.8/km^{2})
- Time zone: UTC-5 (Eastern (EST))
  - Summer (DST): UTC-4 (EDT)
- FIPS code: 39-44240
- GNIS feature ID: 1086599

Liverpool Township is one of the seventeen townships of Medina County, Ohio, United States. The 2020 census found 5,750 people in the township.

== Geography ==
Located in the northern part of the county, it borders the following townships and city:

- Columbia Township, Lorain County - north
- Strongsville - northeast corner
- Brunswick Hills Township - east
- Medina Township - southeast corner
- York Township - south
- Litchfield Township - southwest corner
- Grafton Township, Lorain County - west
- Eaton Township, Lorain County - northwest corner

No municipalities are located in Liverpool Township, although the census-designated place of Valley City is located in the center of the township. The "Frog Jump Capital of Ohio," it lies at the intersection of State Routes 303 (Center Road) and 252 (Columbia Road).

Liverpool Township is located between 20 and 30 miles south of Lake Erie and about five miles west of Interstate 71.

== Name and history ==
This township was named after Liverpool, England. Statewide, the only other Liverpool Township is located in Columbiana County. According to research and Township residents, Liverpool Township was the first permanent settlement in Medina County. Liverpool Township was established in 1816.

== Government ==
The township is governed by a three-member board of trustees, who are elected in November of odd-numbered years to a four-year term beginning on the following January 1. Two are elected in the year after the presidential election and one is elected in the year before it. There is also an elected township clerk, who serves a four-year term beginning on April 1 of the year after the election, which is held in November of the year before the presidential election. Vacancies in the clerkship or on the board of trustees are filled by the remaining trustees.

== Notable people ==
- Jenny Terrill Ruprecht (1839-1916), writer
