= Helen L. Bostwick =

American poet

- Born: Helen Louisa Barron; January 5, 1826; North Charlestown, New Hampshire, U.S.
- Died: December 20, 1907 (aged 81)
- Occupations: Author; poet
- Spouses: Edwin Bostwick (m. 1840; died 1860); John F. Bird (m. 1875; died 1904)
- Children: 2
- Writing career
- Language: English

Helen L. Bostwick (née, Barron; after first marriage, Bostwick; after second marriage, Bird; January 5, 1826 – December 20, 1907) was an American author and poet. Buds, Blossoms, and Berries, stories for children, was published in 1863. Some of her poems are included in a volume entitled Four O'Clocks, published in 1888. Nearly all of her literary work was done in Ohio, where her contemporaries included Alice Williams Brotherton and Kate Brownlee Sherwood.

== Biography ==
Helen Louisa Barron, a daughter of Dr. Putnam Barron, was born January 5, 1826, at North Charlestown, New Hampshire, where the first twelve years of her girlhood were passed. Here she received an elementary common-school education, which was supplemented by special private tuition under Rev. Alonzo Ames Miner, of Boston.

In 1838, she removed with her parents to a farm near Ravenna, Ohio, where, in 1844, at the age of eighteen, she married Edwin Bostwick; he died September 9, 1860. Their daughter, Florence, died at the age of fifteen, and daughter, Marion, died at the age of thirty.

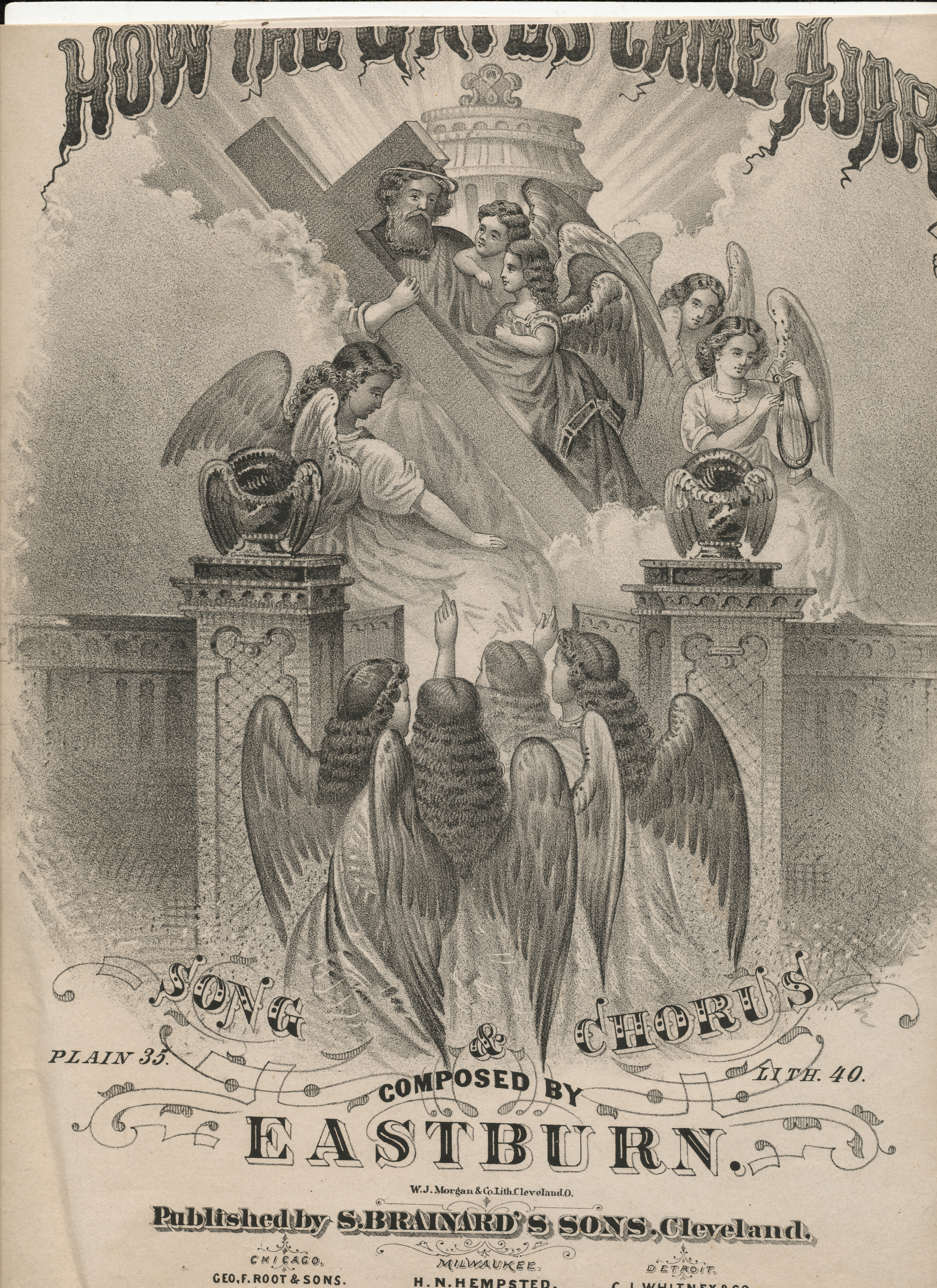
"How the Gates Came Ajar"

Bird began writing for the press at the age of eighteen. Nearly all of her literary work was done in Ohio, chiefly within the period of her first widowhood. For many years, she was a valued contributor to various newspapers and magazines, including The National Era, the New York Independent, the Home Monthly, The Ohio Farmer, the Ladies' Home Journal, The Saturday Evening Post, and the Atlantic Monthly. Bird's best poems, most of which were produced subsequently to the publication of Coggeshall's pioneer collection (Poets and Poetry of the West with Biographical and Critical Notices. , 1880), were contained in a volume entitled Four O'Clocks, which was issued in Philadelphia in 1888. She also wrote for children. "How the Gates Came Ajar" (1869) was composed by Bird, with music by Eastburn.

In 1875, she married Dr. John F. Bird, and removed with him to Philadelphia, where he died January 20, 1904, and where she continued to reside during the remainder of her life. She died December 20, 1907.

== Selected works ==
=== As Helen L. Bostwick ===
- Buds, Blossoms, and Berries, 1863
- "How the Gates Came Ajar", 1869 (lyrics)

=== As Helen Barron Bostwick ===
- Four O'Clocks, 1888
