= Harriett Ellen Arey =

American educator, author, editor and publisher (1819–1901)

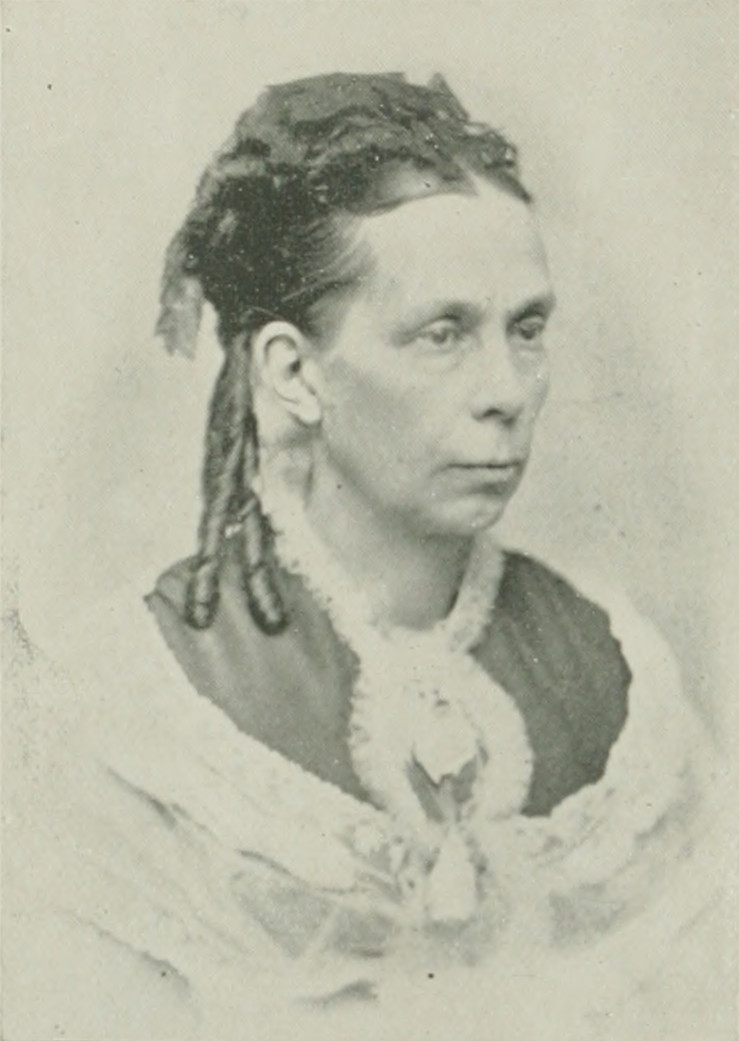
- Photo in A Woman of the Century
- Born: Harriett Ellen Grannis; April 14, 1819; Cavendish, Vermont, U.S.
- Died: April 26, 1901 (aged 82)
- Resting place: Cleveland, Ohio, U.S.
- Education: Oberlin College
- Occupations: author; editor; publisher
- Spouse: Oliver Arey (m. 1848)
- Writing career
- Pen name: Mrs. H. E. G. Arey
- Notable works: Household Songs and Other Poems; Home and School Training

Harriett Ellen Arey (née Grannis; pen name, Mrs. H. E. G. Arey; April 14, 1819 – April 26, 1901) was a 19th-century American educator, author, editor, and publisher. Raised in New England, she was one of the first women in the United States to study in a co-educational environment. In Cleveland, Ohio, she became a contributor to The Daily Cleveland Herald and taught at a girls' school. After marrying, she moved to Wisconsin, and served as "Preceptress and Teacher of English Literature, French, and Drawing" at State Normal School in Whitewater, Wisconsin. After returning to Cleveland, she edited a monthly publication devoted to charitable work, and served on the board of the Woman's Christian Association. Arey was a co-founder and first president of the Ohio Woman's Press Association. Her principal writings were Household Songs and Other Poems and Home and School Training. Arey died in 1901.

== Early life and education ==
Harriett (sometimes "Harriet" or "Hannah") Ellen Grannis was born in Cavendish, Vermont, on April 14, 1819. Her parents were John Grannis, a merchant, and Roxana Chandler Grannis. The family lived across the river in Claremont, New Hampshire. Her grandfather, Timothy Grannis, had moved to Claremont from New Haven, Connecticut, had purchased an estate along the bank of the Connecticut and Sugar Rivers, and had married Sarah, daughter of Dr. William Sumner of Boston. Her mother, Roxana Chandler, was the daughter of David Chandler and Hannah Peabody. These families had been among the earliest European settlers in the Massachusetts Bay Colony, a branch of each being found very early in Andover, Massachusetts, from where another branch went, in the middle of the 18th century, to Amherst, New Hampshire. These ancestors were mainly of Puritan background.

John Grannis was the seventh child in his family. While he was studying for the ministry, his older brothers engaged in extensive business enterprises, but suffered financially due to poor crop yields and the War of 1812. John Grannis left his studies to assist in his brothers' business, with limited financial success. When Harris Grannis was three years old, her father moved to Woodstock, Vermont. When she was five years old, the family moved to Stanstead, Lower Canada, and located at Hatley, a small town on Lake Magog. The schools were good, and she received some of her education here.

At the age of fourteen, Grannis' mother died and, as her father had in the same year been elected a member of the Provincial Parliament, necessitating his presence in Quebec for a considerable portion of the year, the family was broken up. Her uncle, Timothy, sent his son through Vermont and Canada to bring this niece to his home. Here and in the house of another uncle, Thomas Woolson, she spent the next four years, at Claremont, New Hampshire. At the close of this time, her father gathered his family together at a home in Oberlin, Ohio, where he afterwards held offices of trust under the United States Government.

Arey joined him at that town, and entered Oberlin College, class of 1837, becoming one of the earliest young women who pursued a liberal course of education in a co-educational environment. She was then at the head of her father's family and found it necessary to do much of her studying at night. When she neared the close of her junior year, her eyesight failed, and it was many years before she regained substantial use of her eyes. In 1845, she received the degree of AB.

== Career ==
After a period of rest, Grannis became a teacher in Cleveland, at first in the public schools, and afterwards in a ladies' school. She remained there until 1848 when she married Oliver Arey. She began her literary career in Cleveland as a contributor to the Daily Herald of that city.

After marrying, the couple moved to Buffalo, New York. As a student, Arey had written for literary papers as then flourished in Ohio and western New York, as well as for the New York Tribune, Willis & Morris's Home Journal, and Philadelphia magazines, and she continued writing after she moved to Buffalo. In 1856, a volume of her poems was published by James Cephas Derby, New York. She was already engaged in editing a child's magazine, The Youth's Casket, and being subsequently invited to undertake another child's magazine of higher order, she declined, thinking that the demand for such publications was already supplied. Instead, she suggested publishing a magazine devoted to the interests of the household, in distinction from the fashion magazines then so popular. This was accordingly undertaken, the Home Monthly with Abby Buchanan Longstreet (Mrs. C. H. Gildersleeve), and was well received. This was the first known publication in the United States devoted to the interests of the home. After four or five years of this work, she was obliged, from failing health, to abandon it. It was sold to a firm in Boston, coming under the editorship of the William Makepeace Thayer, with her name for two or three years more as associate editor.

Not long after, Arey's husband became principal of the State Normal School (now University at Albany, SUNY) in Albany, New York, a position which he held for two or three years. But, his health having been damaged by a protracted illness, he was obliged to give up for a time the duties of his position; and, through the year 1867, he took charge of the department of Natural Science in the Normal School at Brockport, New York, while Arey served as lady-principal of the school. Her youngest child being then old enough to go with her into the school room, she had decided that in her husband's uncertain state of health her place was at his side. When, at the close of this year, he accepted the principalship of the second normal school of Wisconsin, (now University of Wisconsin–Whitewater), then about to be opened, she headed the ladies' department in this school as "Preceptress and Teacher of English Literature, French, and Drawing". The dedication of the new building at Whitewater had hardly taken place, when the sudden death of their only daughter gave the family a shock. The responsibilities of a large and constantly growing school left no time for literary effort, but as the preceptress occupation suited her, for nine or ten years, she continued in the work.

After nearly a decade in this field, Arey returned East, and, through the winter of 1876–7, was, with her husband, in charge of a ladies' school in Yonkers, New York, but in the following autumn, returned with her husband to Buffalo. A few years later, she found herself back in Cleveland, her husband having received a call to take charge of the normal school in that city.

In 1884, Arey published a small volume entitled: "Home and School Training," (Lippincott & Co., Philadelphia), and soon after, undertook the editing of The Earnest Worker, the organ of the Women's Charitable Association of Cleveland. Her principal writings were Household Songs and Other Poems (New York, 1854); and Home and School Training.

Arey was one of the founders and first president of the Ohio Woman's State Press Association. For many years, she served as president of an active literary and social club.

== Death ==
Harriett Ellen Arey died April 26, 1901, aged 82, and was buried in Cleveland.

== Selected works ==
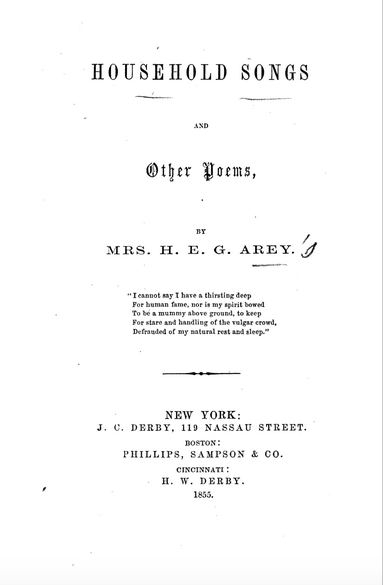
"Household Songs and Other Poems" frontispiece

- 1855, Household songs, and other poems(Arey 1855, p. 1)
- 1884, Home and school training
- 1890, Myself
