= Interstate 480 (Ohio) =

Highway in Ohio

Interstate 480
- Outerbelt South Freeway; Senator John Glenn Highway
- I-480 and I-480N highlighted in red

Route information
- Auxiliary route of I-80
- Maintained by ODOT
- Length: 41.77 mi (67.22 km)
- Existed: 1971–present
- NHS: Entire route

Major junctions
- West end: I-80 Toll / Ohio Turnpike in North Ridgeville
- I-71 in Brook Park; I-77 in Independence; I-271 in Bedford Heights
- East end: I-80 Toll / Ohio Turnpike / SR 14 in Streetsboro

Location
- Country: United States
- State: Ohio
- Counties: Lorain, Cuyahoga, Summit, Portage

Highway system
- Interstate Highway System; Main; Auxiliary; Suffixed; Business; Future; Ohio State Highway System; Interstate; US; State; Scenic
← I-475	→ I-490

Interstate 480 (I-480) is a 41.77-mile-long (67.22 km) auxiliary Interstate Highway of I-80 in the US state of Ohio that passes through much of the Greater Cleveland area, including the southern parts of the city of Cleveland. I-480 is one of 13 auxiliary Interstate Highways in the state. The western terminus of I-480 is an interchange with I-80 and the Ohio Turnpike in North Ridgeville. Starting east through suburban Lorain County, I-480 enters Cuyahoga County, then approaches Cleveland Hopkins International Airport, which serves as the primary airport for Northeast Ohio. After traversing Brooklyn and crossing the Cuyahoga River on the Valley View Bridge, the highway continues east toward the communities of Bedford and Twinsburg toward its eastern terminus at I-80 and the Ohio Turnpike in Streetsboro. On its route, I-480 crosses I-71 and I-77 and is concurrent with I-271 for approximately four miles (6.4 km). In 1998, the governor of Ohio, George Voinovich, gave I-480 the additional name of the "Senator John Glenn Highway", in honor of the former NASA astronaut and US senator from Ohio for 24 years.

Parts of I-480 were to have been I-271 and/or I-80N.

== Route description ==
The freeway runs concurrently with I-271 for two miles (3.2 km). I-271 and I-480 were the only two auxiliary Interstates in the nation that ran concurrently with each other for any distance until 2022, when concurrencies between I-587 and I-795 and I-785 and I-840 in North Carolina were established with the designation of I-587 and the completion of the Greensboro Urban Loop. This is because I-80 was concurrent with I-271 until 1971, when I-80 was routed back on to the turnpike and replaced by I-480.

Due to the convergence of these high traffic roads, congestion is common during peak times. They run concurrently through Bedford Heights, Bedford, and Oakwood in Cuyahoga County. Because of that, the Ohio Department of Transportation (ODOT) started a $120-million (equivalent to $153 million in 2024) widening project in 2016, separating I-271 traffic from I-480 traffic. The project was completed in 2020.

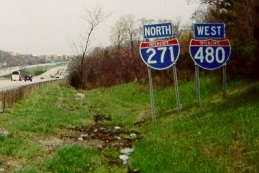
I-271/I-480 north of the State Route 14 (Broadway)/Forbes interchange in 2002

The Valley View Bridge, which is 212 feet (65 m) high and spans 4,150 feet (1,260 m), carries I-480 across the Cuyahoga River valley. It is the busiest crossing in the state of Ohio with approximately 180,000 cars per day.

== History ==
I-480 was conceived as a means of giving motorists a faster way of crossing Cleveland's southern borders and suburbs. The first segment of the route was partially concurrent with I-271 and constructed simultaneously with that highway in 1965. Planning for the route was largely finished by 1968, and construction began on its first mile (1.6 km) began at the highway's interchange with I-77 in 1970.

The segment from Bedford west to Maple Heights opened in November 1976. The segment from Maple Heights west to Brooklyn Heights opened in January 1978.

Construction from west to east began as political controversies and engineering work were resolved on the highway's middle section. I-480 between I-80 and I-71 was completed in 1983. The 1983 ODOT map shows I-480 curving south and terminating at the Brookpark Road (SR 17)/West 139th Street intersection; this short section was later used as ramps in the Exit 12 complex. A westbound-only stretch opened from Tiedeman Road westward to that point on August 4, 1986. The two miles (3.2 km) of the route north and northeast of Cleveland Hopkins International Airport proved the most difficult to plan due to existing high levels of traffic on Brookpark Road and the expansion requirements of the airport.

The final $115-million (equivalent to $303 million in 2024), 2.5-mile (4.0 km) segment linking the east and west ends of I-480 was finished in August 1987.

== Exit list ==
County	Location	mi	km	Exit	Destinations	Notes
Lorain	North Ridgeville	0.00	0.00	—	I-80 Toll / Ohio Turnpike west – Toledo	Western terminus; exit 151 on I-80 / Turnpike
Lorain	North Ridgeville	0.90	1.45	Ohio Turnpike Toll Plaza		
Lorain	North Ridgeville	1.16	1.87	1	SR 10 west to US 20 – Oberlin, Norwalk	Western end of SR 10 concurrency; westbound exit and eastbound entrance; last westbound exit before toll
Lorain	North Ridgeville	2.03	3.27	2	SR 10 east (Lorain Road) to I-80 Toll / Ohio Turnpike east	Eastern end of SR 10 concurrency
Cuyahoga	North Olmsted	3.67	5.91	3	Stearns Road	
Cuyahoga	North Olmsted	6.15	9.90	6	SR 252 (Great Northern Boulevard) – North Olmsted, Olmsted Falls	Signed as exits 6A (south) and 6B (north) westbound
Cuyahoga	North Olmsted	7.57	12.18	7	Clague Road – Westlake, Fairview Park	Westbound exit and eastbound entrance
Cuyahoga	Cleveland	9.44	15.19	9	SR 17 (Brookpark Road) / Grayton Road – Hopkins Airport	Eastbound ramps to SR 17; westbound to Grayton Road
Cuyahoga	Cleveland	10.17	16.37	11	I-71 (Berea Freeway) – Cleveland, Columbus	Eastbound exit and westbound entrance; exit 238 on I-71
Cuyahoga	Cleveland	10.17	16.37	10	SR 237 south (Berea Freeway) – Hopkins Airport, Berea	Westbound exit and eastbound entrance
Cuyahoga	Cleveland	10.71	17.24	11	I-71 south – Columbus	No eastbound exit; exit 238 on I-71
Cuyahoga	Cleveland	11.60	18.67	12A	West 150th Street — Brook Park	Westbound exit only
Cuyahoga	Cleveland	12.71	20.45	12B	West 130th Street / West 150th Street — Brook Park	150th Street not signed westbound; signed as exit 12 eastbound
Cuyahoga	Brooklyn	13.79	22.19	13	Tiedeman Road — Brooklyn	
Cuyahoga	Cleveland	15.21	24.48	15	To US 42 / Ridge Road – Parma	
Cuyahoga	Cleveland	16.49	26.54	16	SR 94 (State Road) to SR 176 south	
Cuyahoga	Cleveland	17.76	28.58	17A	SR 176 north – Cleveland	Signed as exit 17 eastbound; exit 16 on SR 176
Cuyahoga	Brooklyn Heights	18.03	29.02	17B	SR 17 (Brookpark Road) to SR 176 south – Brooklyn Heights	Westbound exit and eastbound entrance
Cuyahoga	Independence	20.05	32.27	20	I-77 / Rockside Road – Akron, Cleveland	Signed as exits 20A (south) and 20B (north); exit 156 on I-77
Cuyahoga	Cuyahoga River	20.59– 21.39	33.14– 34.42	Valley View Bridge		
Cuyahoga	Garfield Heights	21.72	34.95	21	Transportation Boulevard / East 98th Street	
Cuyahoga	Garfield Heights	22.92	36.89	22	SR 17 (Granger Road)	Eastbound exit and westbound entrance
Cuyahoga	Garfield Heights	23.85	38.38	23	SR 14 (Broadway Avenue) – Garfield Heights	
Cuyahoga	Cleveland	24.58	39.56	24	Lee Road – Maple Heights	Westbound exit and eastbound entrance
Cuyahoga	Warrensville Heights	26.03	41.89	25A-B	Warrensville Road — Bedford, Warrensville Heights	Eastbound exit and westbound entrance; signed as exits 25A (south) and 25B (north)
Cuyahoga	Warrensville Heights–Bedford Heights line	26.03– 26.55	41.89– 42.73	25C	SR 8 / SR 43 (Northfield Road)	Eastbound access via frontage roads originating from exit 25A
Cuyahoga	Warrensville Heights–Bedford Heights line	26.31	42.34	26	To I-271 north / US 422 – Erie PA, Warren	Eastbound exit and westbound entrance via I-480N
Cuyahoga	Bedford Heights	27.94	44.97	26A	Rockside Road	Westbound exit and eastbound entrance
Cuyahoga	Bedford Heights	28.02	45.09	26B	I-271 north – Erie PA	Western end of I-271 concurrency; eastbound exit via exit 26
Cuyahoga	Bedford			–	I-271 south – Columbus	Eastern end of I-271 concurrency; exit 21A on I-271; eastbound exit and westbound entrance
Cuyahoga	Oakwood			23B	SR 14 west (Broadway Avenue) / Forbes Road	Western end of SR 14 concurrency; signed as exit 23 westbound
Cuyahoga	Oakwood			22	I-271 south – Columbus	Eastbound exit; westbound entrance is exit 21 on I-271 north
Summit	Twinsburg	36.30	58.42	36	SR 82 – Aurora, Macedonia, Twinsburg	
Summit	Twinsburg	36.99	59.53	37	SR 91 – Twinsburg, Hudson, Solon	
Portage	Streetsboro	41.63	67.00	41	Frost Road	
Portage	Streetsboro	42.45	68.32	42	I-80 Toll / Ohio Turnpike – Youngstown, Toledo	Exit 187 on I-80 / Turnpike
Portage	Streetsboro	42.45	68.32	–	SR 14 east – Ravenna	Continuation east; eastern end of SR 14 concurrency
1.000 mi = 1.609 km; 1.000 km = 0.621 mi: Concurrency terminus; Incomplete access; Tolled

== Interstate 480N ==
Interstate 480N
- Location: Maple Heights–Warrensville Heights
- Length: 1.99 mi (3.20 km)
- Existed: 1974–present

Interstate 480N (I-480N) is officially designated as the spur freeway connecting I-480 to I-271 and US Route 422 (US 422) by ODOT. The highway lacks conventional confirming markers; the only shields for the route are on milemarkers. Other guide signs only refer to the routes at I-480N's termini.

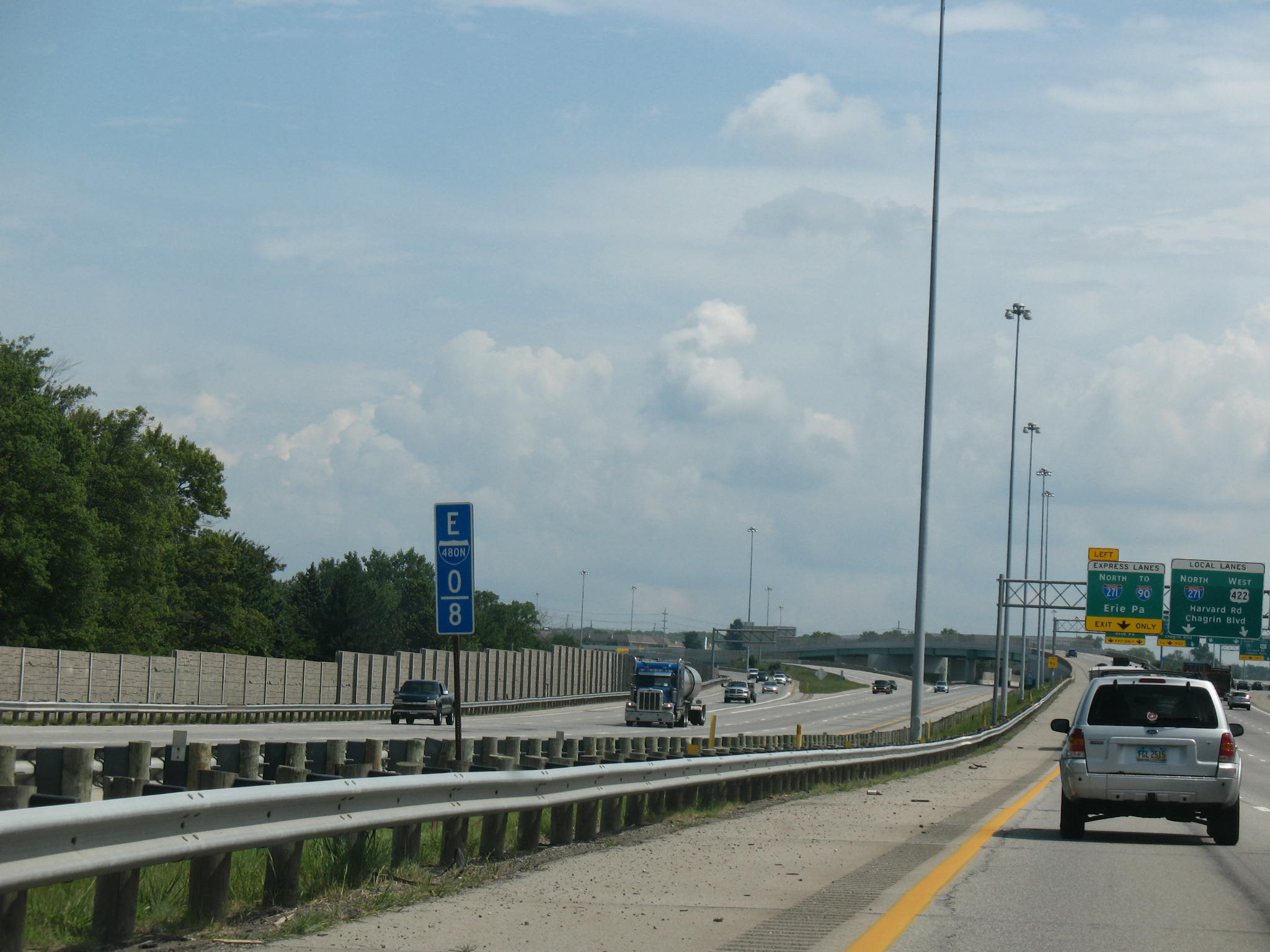
A view of I-480N about halfway through the route

Major intersections

The entire route is in Cuyahoga County.

Location	mi	km	Exit	Destinations	Notes
Maple Heights	0.00	0.00	–	I-480 west – Cleveland, Toledo	Exit 26 on I-480
North Randall	0.53– 0.78	0.85– 1.26	1	Miles Road – North Randall, Bedford Heights	
Warrensville Heights	1.29	2.08	—	I-271 north (Express Lanes) to I-90 – Erie, PA	Eastbound exit and westbound entrance
Warrensville Heights	1.63	2.62	–	I-271 south to I-480 east – Columbus	Westbound exit and eastbound entrance; exit 27A on I-271; exit 13A on US 422
Warrensville Heights	1.63	2.62	—	I-271 north / US 422 west (Local Lanes) / Harvard Road / Chagrin Boulevard	Eastbound exit and westbound entrance; exit 27B on I-271
Warrensville Heights	1.99	3.20	–	US 422 east – Warren	Exit 13B on US 422
1.000 mi = 1.609 km; 1.000 km = 0.621 mi: Incomplete access
