= Valley City, Ohio =

- Census-designated place
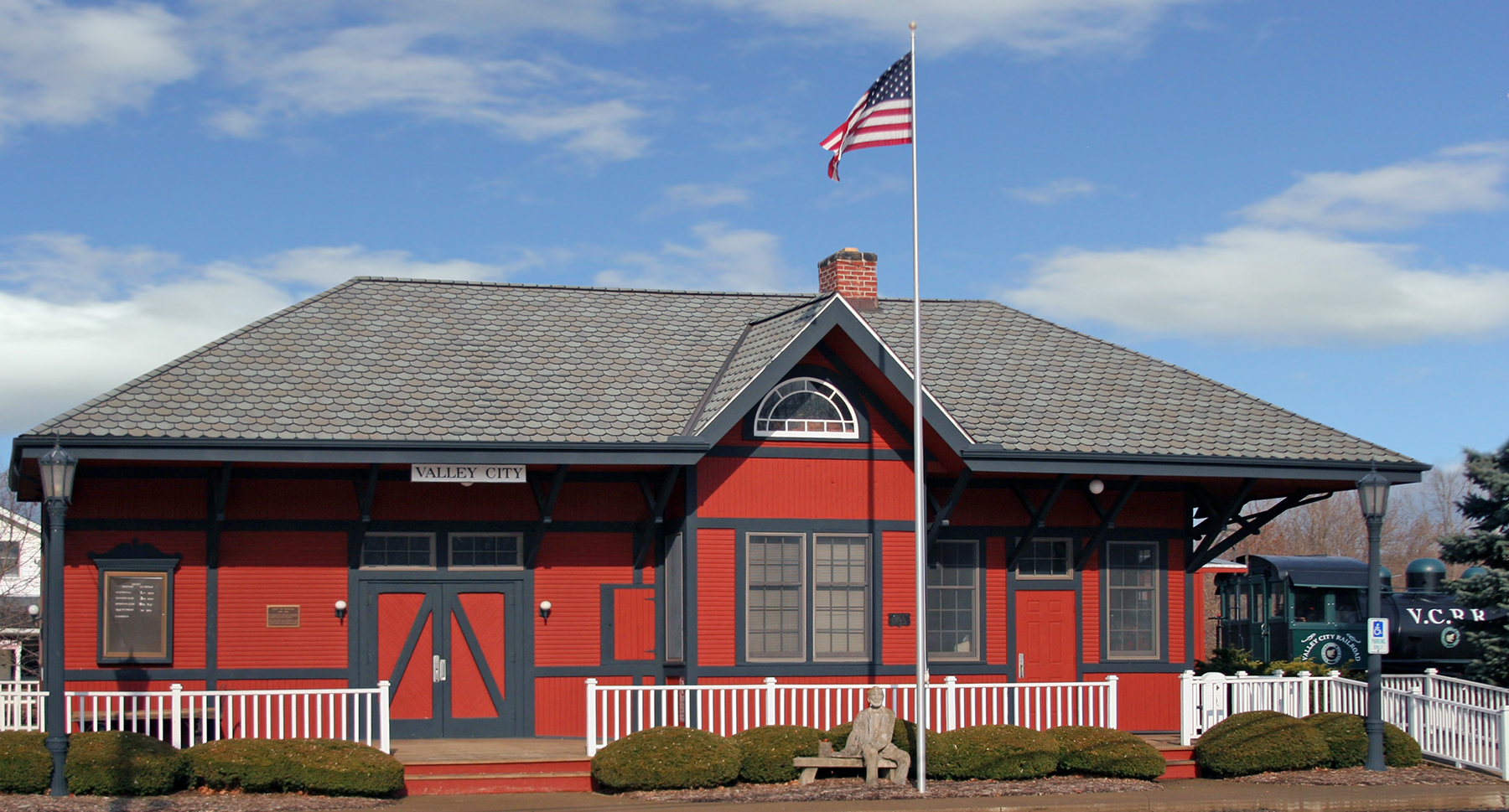
- Valley City Depot Museum

- Location within Ohio Location within the United States
- Coordinates: 41°14′01″N 81°56′23″W
- Country: United States
- State: Ohio
- County: Medina
- Township: Liverpool

Area
  - Total: 1.87 sq mi (4.85 km^{2})
  - Land: 1.87 sq mi (4.85 km^{2})
  - Water: 0 sq mi (0.00 km^{2})
- Elevation: 869 ft (265 m)

Population (2020)
  - Total: 5,343
  - Density: 503.6/sq mi (194.45/km^{2})
- Time zone: UTC-5 (Eastern (EST))
  - Summer (DST): UTC-4 (EDT)
- ZIP Code: 44280
- Area code: 330
- FIPS code: 39-79184
- GNIS feature ID: 2628981

Valley City is an unincorporated community and census-designated place (CDP) in central Liverpool Township, Medina County, Ohio, United States. As of the 2020 census, the population was 5,343.

== History ==
In 1810, Seba Bronson, Jr., a Revolutionary War veteran, arrived in the "Hardscrabble" area of Liverpool Township (the present-day corner of Columbia Road and Grafton Road). A "squatter", Bronson occupied the land, planted corn, built a dwelling, and established a thriving salt works. The surrounding Liverpool Township was established in 1816.

== Geography ==
The community is in northeastern Ohio, in the northern part of Medina County and the west-central part of Liverpool Township. Ohio State Route 303 passes through the community as Center Road, leading east 4.5 miles (7.2 km) to Brunswick and west 10 miles (16 km) to LaGrange. State Route 252 passes just east of Valley City, leading north 10 miles (16 km) to Olmsted Falls and south toward Medina, the county seat, 9 miles (14 km) away.

According to the U.S. Census Bureau, the Valley City CDP has a total area of 1.87 square miles (4.84 km^{2}), all of it recorded as land. The West Branch of the Rocky River forms the eastern border of the CDP, while its tributary Plum Creek passes through the west side. The Rocky River flows north to Lake Erie at the city of Rocky River west of Cleveland.

Together with Litchfield and York Townships, Liverpool Township composes the Buckeye Local School District. Valley City is part of Ohio District 7 in the U.S. House of Representatives.

== Demographics ==
Historical population
Census	Pop.	Note	%±
2020	5,343		—
U.S. Decennial Census

Valley City was first listed as a census-designated place prior to the 2020 census.

== Arts and culture ==
Valley City is known for being "The Frog Jump Capital of Ohio". Since 1962, it has held an annual contest patterned after Mark Twain's story, "The Celebrated Jumping Frog of Calaveras County". On April 2, 1964, two years after the first contest was held, Governor Jim Rhodes proclaimed this contest the official state frog jumping championship. In 1969, a few Valley City champion frogs competed in the larger contest in Calaveras County, California, including one belonging to Governor Rhodes. Today, the contest is held at the Mill Stream Park in early August. The contest drew record-breaking crowds in 2021, with over 750 frogs jumping and 4,000 attendees.

An annual street fair is held on the last weekend of August to support the local fire department.
