= Ohio State Route 176 =

State highway in Ohio, US

State Route 176

Route information
- Maintained by ODOT
- Length: 19.42 mi (31.25 km)
- Existed: 1924–present

Major junctions
- South end: I-77 / SR 21 in Richfield
- I-480 in Cleveland
- North end: I-71 in Cleveland

Location
- Country: United States
- State: Ohio
- Counties: Summit, Cuyahoga

Highway system
- Ohio State Highway System; Interstate; US; State; Scenic
← SR 175	→ SR 177

Ohio State Route 176 (SR 176) is a route linking Interstate 71 (I-71) in Cleveland to I-77 near Richfield. The freeway portion is known as the Jennings Freeway, while the at-grade portion is mostly Broadview Road.

== Route description ==
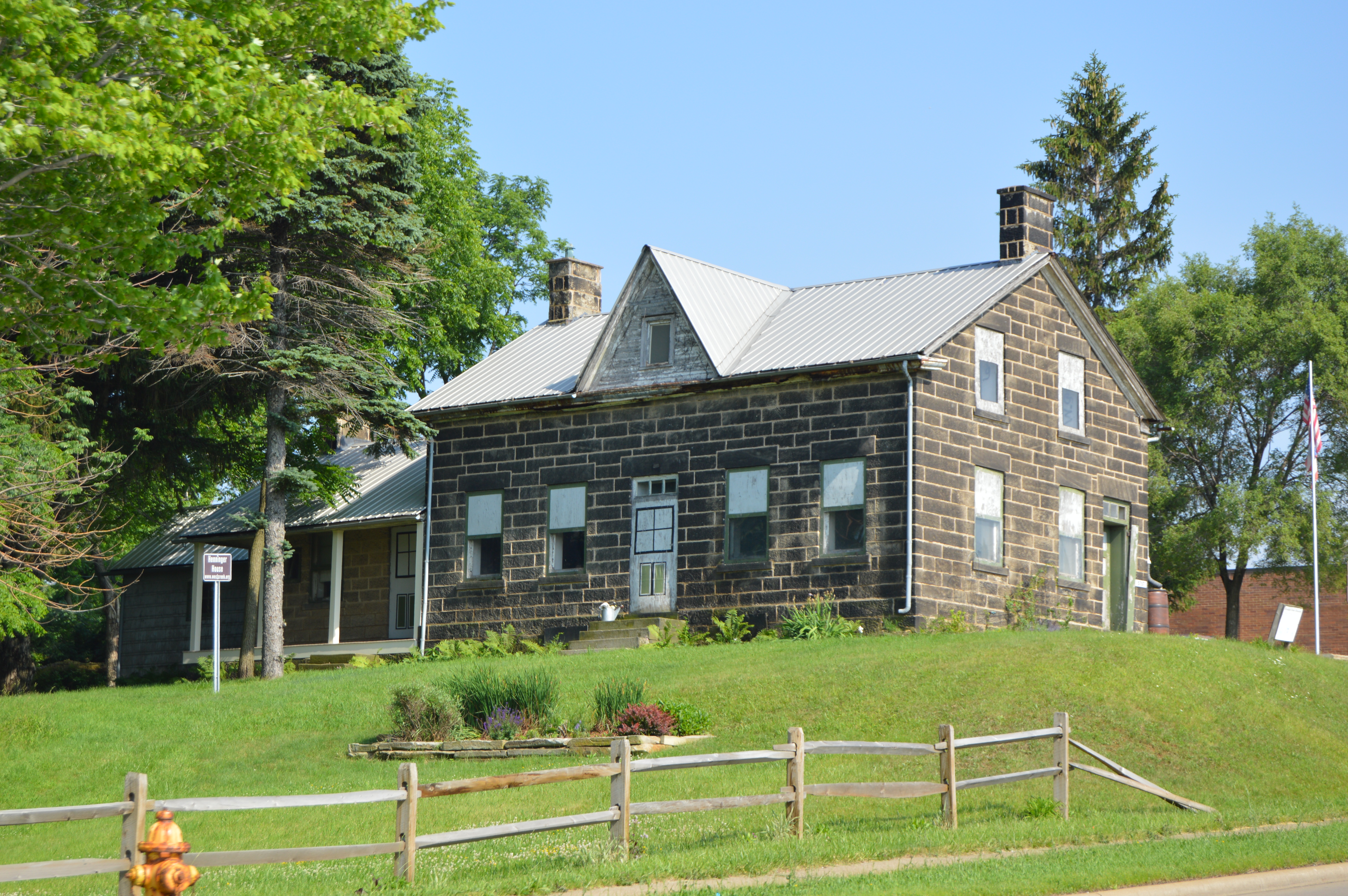
Roadside scene, the 1840s Phillip Henninger House in Parma

From its southern terminus at I-77 to SR 17, SR 176 has at-grade intersections. SR 176's route from SR 17 (Brookpark Road) to I-71 is a limited-access highway. From 1968, it functioned as an exit off of I-71 and side streets, terminating at Denison Road and serving businesses in the industrial valley. As traffic volumes to suburbs such as Parma and Parma Heights increased – and to relieve traffic from I-77 to I-480 – the freeway portion of the route (known as the Jennings Freeway) was extended as originally planned to I-480 and Brookpark Road (SR 17), opening December 8, 1998.

== History ==
Soon after its creation, SR 176 was extended to Akron, routed with U.S. Route 21 (US 21; here part of Cleveland-Massillon Road), over SR 92 (Ghent Road), replacing it, and along Market Street with a portion SR 18 (at the time, SR 18 followed Twin Oaks Road from Market Street) to downtown Akron, ending at the High Street/Broadway Street couplet (then SR 5, 8, and 261, now just SR 261). After the completion of I-77, SR 176 was relocated along Wheatley Road and moved on to I-77 from exits 143 to 138, before rejoining its original alignment. In the early 1970s, US 21 was changed to SR 21 at that location, and SR 176 was truncated at I-77 exit 143. SR 18 was also truncated, but realigned to follow the entirety of Market Street (which had also carried the also-truncated SR 8 east of High and Broadway) to end at SR 91.

== Major intersections ==
County	Location	mi	km	Exit	Destinations	Notes
Summit	Richfield	0.00	0.00		I-77 / SR 21 to I-271 north – Akron, Cleveland	Exit 143 on I-77 / SR 21
Summit	Richfield	2.54	4.09		SR 303 (Streetsboro Road)	
Cuyahoga	Broadview Heights	8.12	13.07		SR 82 (Royalton Road)	
Cuyahoga	Cleveland–Parma line	15.47	24.90		SR 17 west (Brookpark Road) / Broadview Road (SR 176J north)	Western terminus of SR 17 concurrency
Cuyahoga	Cleveland–Parma line	15.72	25.30		SR 17 east (Brookpark Road)	Eastern terminus of SR 17 concurrency
Cuyahoga	Cleveland–Parma line	15.79	25.41	Southern terminus of Jennings Freeway		
Cuyahoga	Cleveland	16.35	26.31	16A-B	I-480 – Toledo, Youngstown	Southbound exit and northbound entrance; signed as exits 16A (east) and 16B (west)
Cuyahoga	Cleveland	16.94	27.26	16C	Spring Road / Hinckley Parkway	Signed as exit 16 northbound
Cuyahoga	Cleveland	18.26	29.39	18A	Denison Avenue / Harvard Avenue	
Cuyahoga	Cleveland	18.45	29.69	18B	Jennings Road / Steelyard Drive	Southbound exit and northbound entrance
Cuyahoga	Cleveland	18.94	30.48	–	I-71 south – Columbus	Southbound exit only; exit 246 on I-71
Cuyahoga	Cleveland	19.24	30.96	–	I-71 south / West 14th Street / Steelyard Drive	Northbound exit only; exit 246 on I-71
Cuyahoga	Cleveland	19.42	31.25	–	I-90 / I-490 east to I-77 – Toledo, Cleveland	Exit 170B on I-90; exit 1A on I-490
1.000 mi = 1.609 km; 1.000 km = 0.621 mi: Concurrency terminus; Incomplete access; Route transition

== Route 176J ==
State Route 176J
- Location: Cleveland
- Length: 1.72 mi (2.77 km)
- Existed: 1998–c. 2017

Route 176J was the section of Broadview Road between Brookpark Road (SR 17) in Parma and Pearl Road (U.S. Route 42) in the Old Brooklyn neighborhood of Cleveland, which formerly carried SR 176. Since the relocation of SR 176 onto the Jennings Freeway in 1998, this roadway was intended to be turned over from the state system to the local government ("J" suffix meaning "awaiting abandonment"). The road was kept under state maintenance until it was turned over to the city of Cleveland between 2015 and 2017.
