= Mary Hayes Houghton =

American journalist

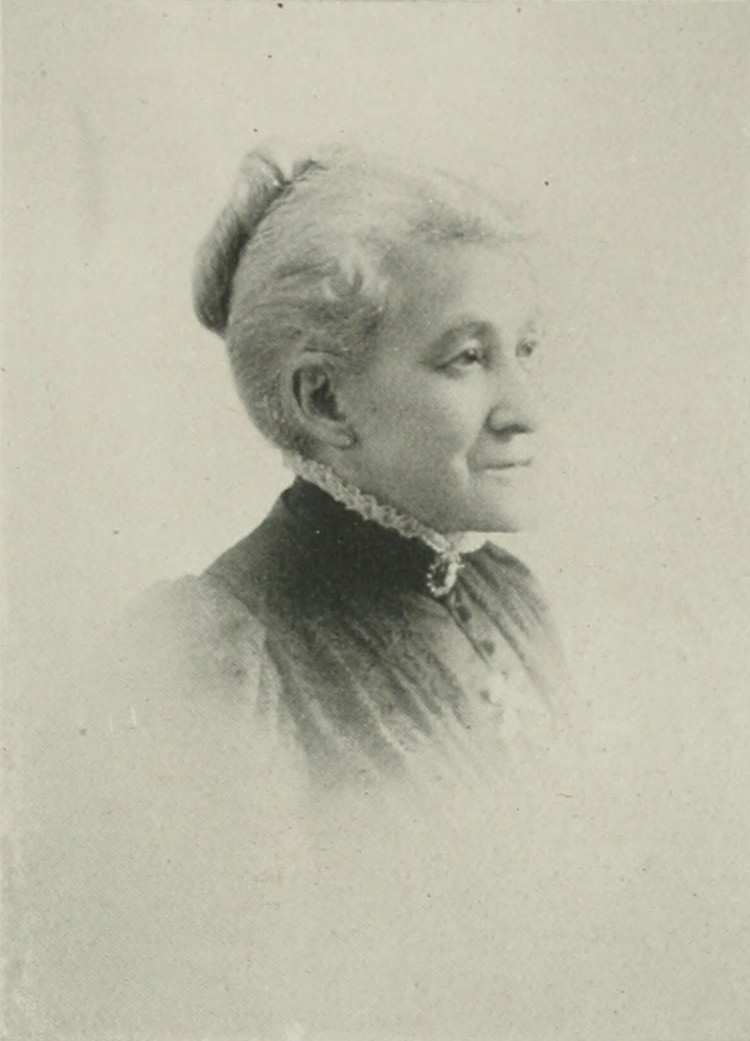
- Photo from A Woman of the Century
- Born: Mary Hayes; March 26, 1845 Penfield, Ohio, U.S.
- Died: November 12, 1921 (aged 84) Wellington, Ohio
- Resting place: Greenwood Cemetery; Wellington, Ohio
- Occupation: Journalist
- Spouse: John Wesley Houghton (m. 1874)

Mary Hayes Houghton (March 26, 1837 – November 12, 1921) was an American journalist.

== Early life ==
Houghton was born Mary Hayes in Penfield, Ohio to Western Reserve pioneer parents from New England on March 26, 1837. The eldest daughter of a large family, her school life was frequently interrupted by ill-health. Despite her health issues her reading and study went on, covering a large range in history, philosophy and literature.

She married John Wesley Houghton, a writer and medical doctor, in 1874.

== Career ==
From the age of eighteen years, Houghton had written for publications and her connection with the press served to give variety, breadth and finish to her composition. The bulk of her literary work was anonymously written, and some of it was widely copied. She actively identified with multiple organizations that were at various times religious, reformatory and literary. She was president of a woman's club and also a member of the Ohio Woman's Press Association. In addition, she was also a member of the Woman's Christian Temperance Union (W.C.T.U.), and a founding member of both the Woman's Home and the Foreign Missionary Societies.

In 1876, two years after their marriage, John Houghton became proprietor of The Wellington Enterprise and Mary was his assistant editor. Though she was characterized in an 1897 biographical sketch as an "editorial assistant" to her husband, he later wrote in a family history that she was his "assistant editor" and "contributed the larger share of copy" (Houghton Genealogy, pg. 142). After nine years, the paper was sold due to John Houghton's failing health in 1885.

She collaborated with Louise Seymour Houghton on French by reading, a progressive French method.
