= Ohio State Route 252 =

State highway in northern Ohio, US

State Route 252

Route information
- Maintained by ODOT
- Length: 23.04 mi (37.08 km)
- Existed: 1925–present

Major junctions
- South end: SR 18 / SR 57 near Medina
- I-480 in North Olmsted; US 20 in Westlake; I-90 / SR 2 in Westlake
- North end: US 6 in Bay Village

Location
- Country: United States
- State: Ohio
- Counties: Medina, Lorain, Cuyahoga

Highway system
- Ohio State Highway System; Interstate; US; State; Scenic
| ← SR 251 | → SR 253 |

State Route 252 (SR 252) is a 23.04-mile (37.08 km) long north–south state highway in the northern portion of the U.S. state of Ohio. The southern terminus of this state route is at a signalized intersection that marks the western split of the concurrency of SR 18 and SR 57 nearly 1.25 miles (2.01 km) northwest of the city limits of Medina. SR 252 has its northern terminus at a T-intersection with U.S. Route 6 (US 6) in the western Cleveland suburb of Bay Village.

== Route description ==
Along its path, SR 252 travels through northern Medina County, the extreme eastern portion of Lorain County and the westernmost part of Cuyahoga County. There are no stretches of SR 252 that are included as a part of the National Highway System.

== History ==
SR 252 was assigned in 1925. It was originally along its current alignment from its southern terminus at SR 18 and SR 57 northwest of Medina to its junction with SR 82, at the time known as SR 81, west of Strongsville. One year later, the highway was extended north to its current northern terminus.

== Major intersections ==
| County | Location | mi | km | Destinations | Notes |
|---|---|---|---|---|---|
| Medina | York Township | 0.00 | 0.00 | SR 18 / SR 57 south / CR 24 south – Medina, Norwalk | Southern terminus of SR 252 and concurrency with SR 57 |
| Medina | York Township | 0.93 | 1.50 | SR 57 north / CR 65 – Lester, Erhart, Elyria | Northern terminus of concurrency with SR 57 |
| Medina | Liverpool Township | 4.92 | 7.92 | SR 303 (Center Road) – Valley City, Brunswick | |
| Lorain | Columbia Township | 10.45 | 16.82 | SR 82 – Elyria, Strongsville | |
| Cuyahoga | North Olmsted | 17.68 | 28.45 | I-480 – Toledo, Cleveland | Exit 6 on I-480 |
| Cuyahoga | North Olmsted | 18.01 | 28.98 | SR 17 (Brookpark Road) | |
| Cuyahoga | North Olmsted | 18.45 | 29.69 | SR 10 west (Lorain Road) | Southern terminus of concurrency with SR 10 |
| Cuyahoga | North Olmsted | 18.84 | 30.32 | SR 10 east (Lorain Road) / Columbia Road | Northern terminus of concurrency with SR 10 |
| Cuyahoga | Westlake | 21.01 | 33.81 | US 20 / SR 113 (Center Ridge Road) | |
| Cuyahoga | Westlake | 21.99 | 35.39 | SR 254 (Detroit Road) | |
| Cuyahoga | Westlake | 22.13 | 35.61 | I-90 / SR 2 – Toledo, Cleveland | Exit 159 on I-90 / SR 2 |
| Cuyahoga | Bay Village | 23.04 | 37.08 | US 6 / LECT (Lake Road) | Northern terminus |
1.000 mi = 1.609 km; 1.000 km = 0.621 mi: Concurrency terminus
