= Jenny Terrill Ruprecht =

American writer

Jennie Terrill Ruprecht
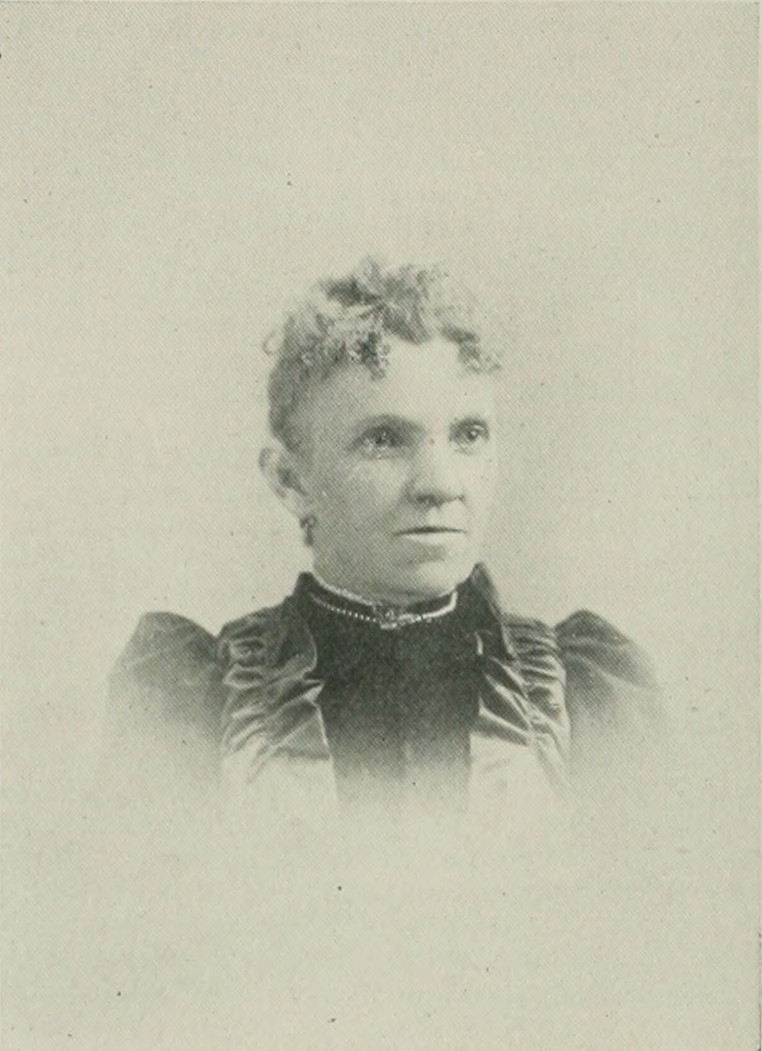
- Portrait from A Woman of the Century
- Born: Jane Elizabeth Terrill; May 23, 1839; Liverpool Township, Medina County, Ohio, U.S.
- Died: January 19, 1916 (aged 76); Cleveland, Ohio, U.S.
- Occupation: writer
- Spouse: Charles Ruprecht
- Writing career
- Pen name: Jenny Terrill Ruprecht
- Genres: poems; sketches; juvenile literature

Jane Elizabeth Terrill Ruprecht (pen name, Jenny Terrill Ruprecht; nickname, Jennie Terrill Ruprecht; May 23, 1839 – January 19, 1916) was an American writer. She published poems, sketches, and juvenile stories in magazines and newspapers. Her poems were widely copied. She also did a large amount of work for children, consisting of poems, stories, and articles.

== Biography ==
Jane Elizabeth Terrill was born in Liverpool Township, Medina County, Ohio, May 23, 1839. (Note: According to Willard & Livermore (1893), Ruprecht was born in 1840.) She was of New England parentage, both of her parents, Nelson Terrill (1798-1862) and Elizabeth (née) Prindle (1798-1867) having been born in Vermont. Many of her ancestors fought in the Revolutionary War.

She received limited encouragement to cultivate her early talent for writing as her parents feared that writing, along with the ordinary routine of study, would prove too great a strain on their child's sensitivities. Ruprecht's childhood, with the exception of two or three years, was spent in the countryside. For this reason, many of her poems deal with nature.

After a brief experience as a school teacher, Terrill married Charles Ruprecht, in Cuyahoga, Ohio, on June 20, 1861. He was a native of Baden, Germany. For many years, Ruprecht's home was in Cleveland, Ohio.

While she contributed largely to the local press, many of Ruprecht's poems and sketches appeared in eastern and other magazines and papers, as well as in many religious weeklies. Some of her poems were published under a pseudonym. She wrote numerous juvenile stories and poems, as well as a volume entitled Home Rhymes.

Ruprecht was a charter member of the Cleveland Woman's Press Association and a member of the Ohio Woman's Press Association. She was also a member of the Cleveland Sorosis, and other literary and social organizations.

For many years, Ruprecht was engaged in home missionary work, particularly in areas of Cleveland where emigrants lived. Many emigrant children became members of the Sunday school, organized and put under her supervision while she was superintendent.

Jenny Terrill Ruprecht died in Cleveland, Ohio, on January 19, 1916.

== Selected works ==
=== Poems ===
- "A Woman's Patriotism" (1898), Spanish-American War Songs
- "Mary Magdalene" (1899), Christian Advocate
- "Midsummer" (1898), Lippincott's Monthly Magazine
- "November" (1900), Outing
- "Red-Eyed Vireo" (1900), Through the Year with Birds and Poets
- "Tented" (1891), Peterson's Magazine
- "The Cloud" (1899), Churchman
- "The Club Woman's Husband" (1898), The Herald
- "The Preacher-Bird" (1899), Birds and Nature
- "The Star of the Street" (1912), The Edison Monthly
- "The Walk to Emmaus" (1903), The Western Christian Advocate
- "The Wild Clematis" (1901), Birds and Nature
- "What is True Art?" (1900), The Stevenson Chronicle
- "Would Thou Wert Here" (1900), The Standard

=== Articles ===
- "Isabella of Castille" (1915), The Western Reserve of Ohio ...
- "What Kinds of Poetry Are Most in Demand?" (1897), The Editor
