= The Ohio Farmer (newspaper) =

- Categories: Trade magazine
- Frequency: Monthly
- Founder: Thomas Brown
- Founded: 1852
- Company: Farm Progress
- Country: United States
- Based in: Cleveland, Ohio
- Language: English
- Website: www.ohiofarmer.com
- ISSN: 0030-0896

The Ohio Farmer was an agricultural newspaper established by Thomas Brown in Cleveland, Ohio in the mid-1800s. It was a weekly publication centered on farm and family life and provided sections for farming, housekeeping, and for children.

As proclaimed in its header, The Ohio Farmer was "devoted to the improvement and betterment of the farmer, his family, and farm." The Ohio Farmer is part of the Farm Progress family of newspapers.

== Contributors ==
- Helen Louisa Bostwick Bird
