= Kate Brownlee Sherwood =

American journalist

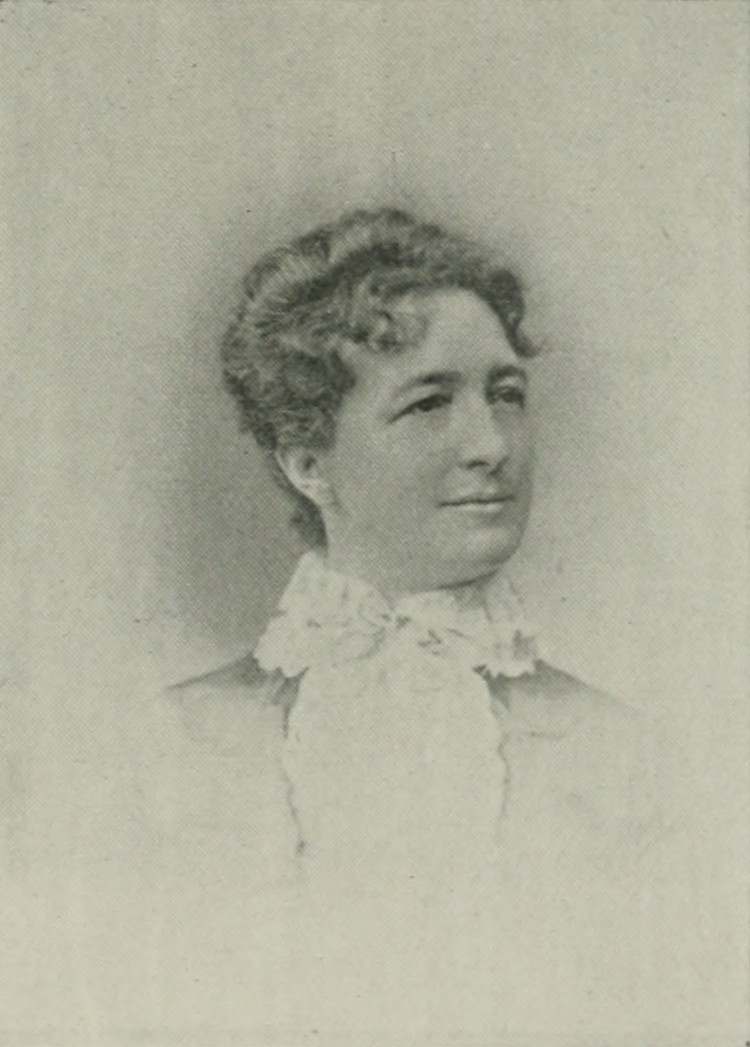
- Photo from A Woman of the Century
- Born: Katharine Margaret Brownlee; September 24, 1841/September 25, 1841 (disputed); Mahoning County, Ohio or Bedford Springs, Pennsylvania (disputed)
- Died: February 15, 1914 (aged 72); Washington, D.C.
- Education: Poland Union Seminary
- Occupations: Poet; journalist; translator
- Organization(s): Second National President, Woman's Relief Corps
- Spouse: Isaac R. Sherwood

Kate Brownlee Sherwood (née, Brownlee; September 24, 1841 – February 15, 1914) was an American poet, journalist, translator, and story writer of the long nineteenth century, as well as a philanthropist and patron of the arts and literature. Sherwood was also the founder of the Woman's Relief Corps (WRC) and served as its second president. With Julia Rice Seney, Sherwood was regarded as one of the founders of the University of Toledo.

After marriage, she entered into her husband's journalistic work, where she learned to typeset, proofread, and manage all the details pertaining to the work in order to assist him. She contributed to various magazines and periodicals, and from 1883, was an editor of the Woman's Department of the National Tribune at Washington, D.C., a paper devoted to the interest of soldiers.

She is best known as the author of army lyrics and poems written for the celebration of military occasions. She was the author of: Camp-Fire and Memorial Poems (1885); Dreams of the Ages; a Poem of Columbia (1893); The Memorial of the Flowers (1888), and Guarding the Flags (1890). Sherwood's memorial poem, Albert Sidney Johnston, was written at the invitation of the executive committee for the Unveiling Ceremonies of the General Albert Sidney Johnston Equestrian Statue, held under the auspices of the Army of the Tennessee Louisiana Division (Ex-Confederate) at New Orleans. Helen Louisa Bostwick Bird and Alice Williams Brotherton were contemporary poets from Ohio.

== Early life and education ==
Sherwood was born Katharine Margaret Brownlee in either Mahoning County, Ohio, or Bedford Springs, Pennsylvania, on either September 24, 1841, or September 25, 1841. She was of Scotch descent. Her ancestors were Revolutionary patriots. Her father was a classical scholar, and both parents were fond of song and poetry. One of the earliest recollections of the child is hearing them recount the ballads and lyrics of Scottish romance and adventure, which impressed upon her mind and cultivated her tastes for that style of poetry.

She was a daughter of Judge James and Rebecca (née Mullin) Brownlee of Poland, Ohio; granddaughter of Alexander and Margaret (née Smith) Brownlee and of George and Katharine (née Hammer) Mullin, and a descendant of James and Margaret (née Craig) Brownlee, who came to America in 1800. James Brownlee Sr. was the Laird of Torfoot, in the parish of Avondale, Lanarkshire, Scotland, and his grandson, James, was successor, by inheritance; but he chose America and emigrated from Scotland to the United States in 1828, and settled in Trumbull County, Ohio, and became associate judge of the third judicial district of which it was a part. She was educated at the Poland Union Seminary.

At twelve, she was sent to school in Poland, Pennsylvania, and afterwards to a Presbyterian academy.

== Career ==
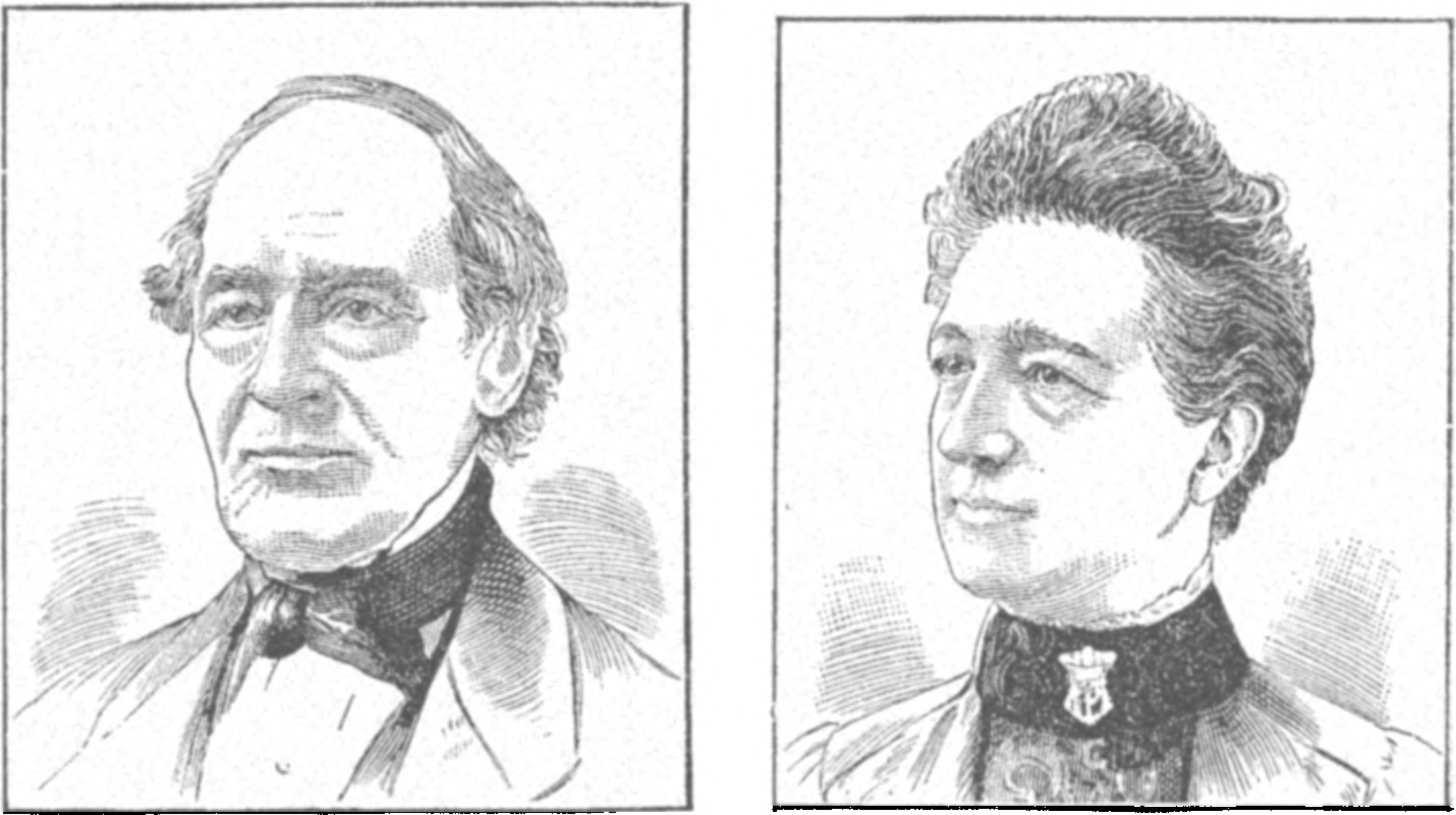
Isaac and Kate Sherwood

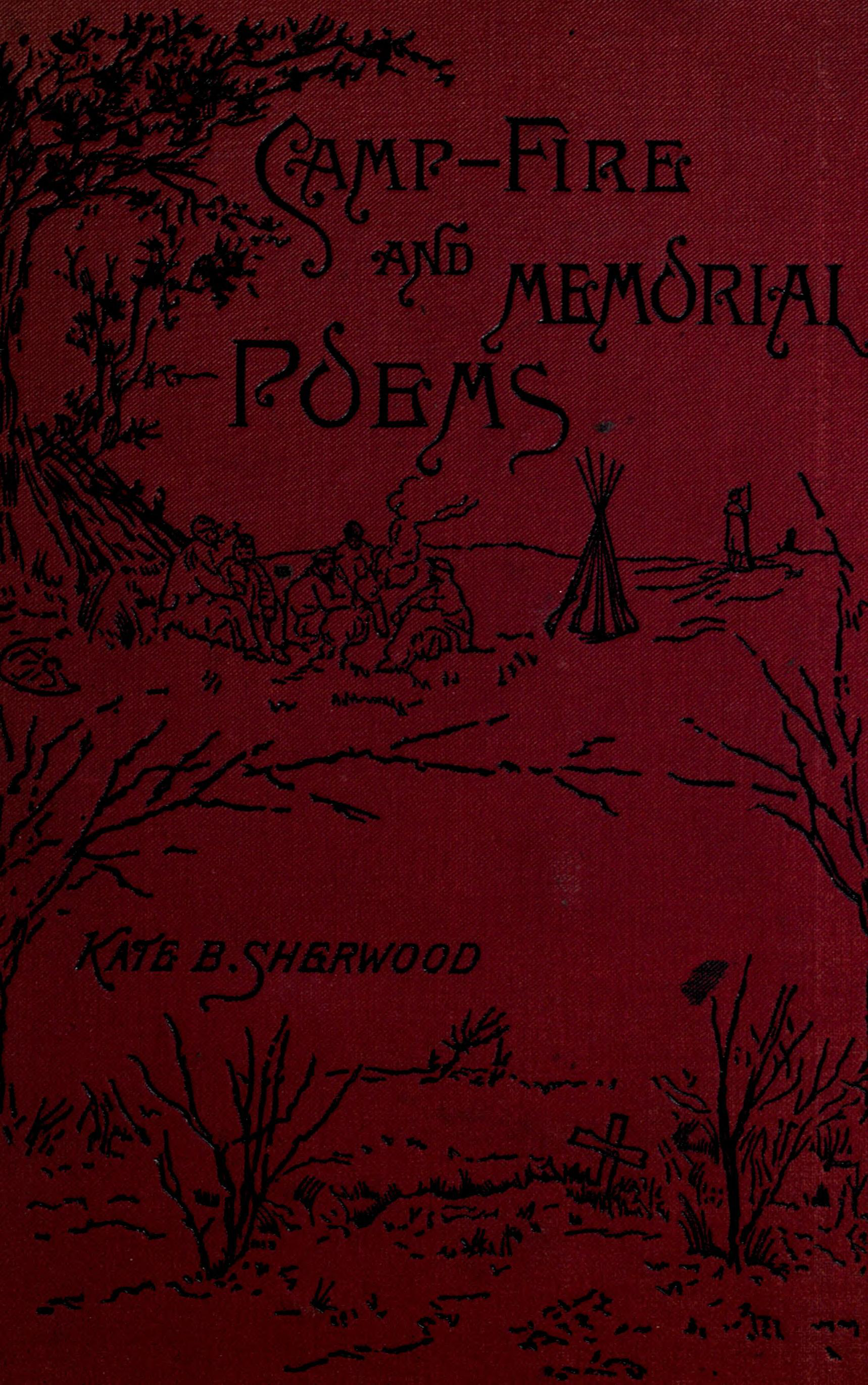
Camp-Fire, Memorial-Day, and Other Poems

=== Writer ===
She met Isaac R. Sherwood, an editor of Bryan, Ohio, while he was a student at the Ohio Law College. On September 1, 1859, at the age of 18, they married. Later, Isaac became a General, Secretary of State and Congressman from Ohio. When he was the editor of the Canton, Ohio, Daily News-Democrat, she learned everything in the line of newspaper work from typesetting to leader-writing. While he was in Congress, she served as Washington correspondent for Ohio journals. In 1883, General Sherwood became the sole proprietor of the Toledo Journal; Kate Sherwood assisted in the editorial management of the paper until 1886, when Condict C. Packard and E. J. Tippett purchased the establishment. For 10 years, she edited the woman's department of the soldier organ, the National Tribune of Washington D.C. Her career as a journalist and society woman was varied and busy. She was one of the first members of the Washington Literary Club and the Sorosis of New York City; she also served as vice-president for Ohio in the first call for a national congress of women.

In the spring of 1885, she published "Camp Fire and Memorial Poems," a volume of recitations for Grand Army camp fires, which was widely read, and some of the poems were translated into German; it passed through several editions. She was the chosen singer for many national celebrations, including army reunions, and in 1887, was the only northern poet ever invited by ex-Confederates to celebrate the heroism of a southern soldier. The broad, liberal and delicate manner in which she responded to that significant honor in her poem at the unveiling of the equestrian statue of Albert Sidney Johnston, in New Orleans, Louisiana, elicited praise. "Mission Ridge" was an account of the bravery and death of a drummer boy. "A Soldier's Retrospect" reminisced after the Civil War. "The Men Who Wore the Shield" was a spirited patriotic address. "The Drummer Boy of Mission Ridge" was an account of the bravery and death of a drummer boy. Having studied French and German, Sherwood's translations of Heinrich Heine, Johann Wolfgang von Goethe, and Friedrich von Bodenstedt were widely copied.

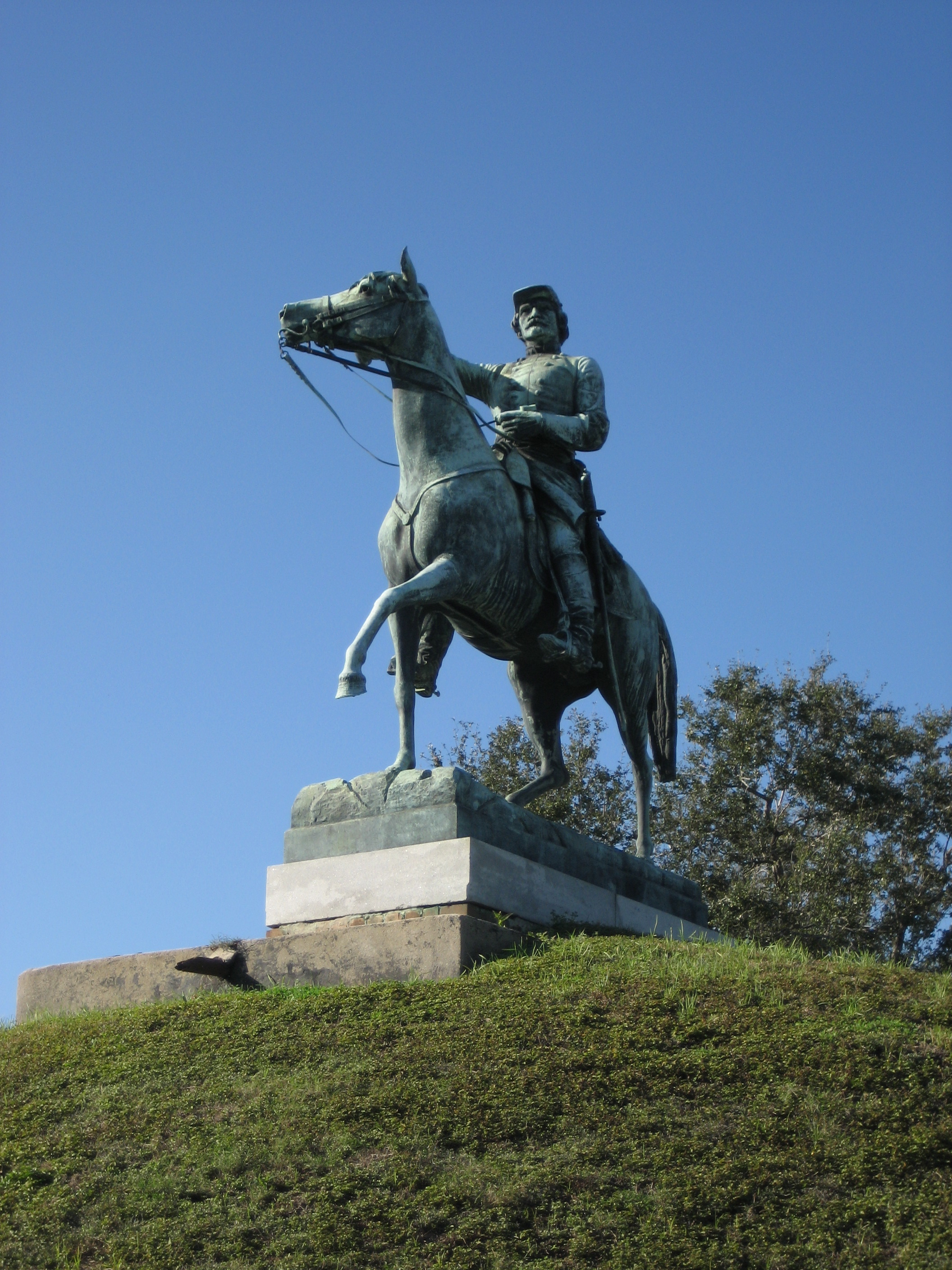
Albert Sidney Johnston Equestrian Statue

Albert Sidney Johnston was a memorial poem, written by Sherwood at the invitation of the executive committee for the Unveiling Ceremonies of the General Albert Sidney Johnston Equestrian Statue, held under the auspices of the Army of the Tennessee, Louisiana Division (Ex-Confederate) at New Orleans, April 6, 1887, 25th Anniversary of the Battle of Shiloh and of General Johnston's death. Sherwood received the following letter:

At the unveiling of the equestrian statue to General Albert Sidney Johnston, April 6, 1887, in the city of New Orleans, on the memorial day of the association of the Confederate Army of Tennessee, your poem, sent us from your Northern home, a graceful tribute to him and our heroic dead, was read to an appreciative and admiring throng. In grateful response, the Association returns, with its greeting, its accompanying badge. The center bears the Confederate Cross, and the Pelican is of metal taken from a rivet of the statue itself. As "Peace hath her victories no less than War", we join heart with hand in reciprocating the cordial and fraternal sentiments set in those sweet and stirring strains, in which a woman's true soul, giving all honor to the knightly men and the gallant deeds on either side, in that "Great war that made ambition virtue", commemorates in charming numbers our day of reunion when veterans of the Blue and the Gray met. "But not as rivals, nor as foes, as brothers reconciled. To twine love's fragrant roses where the thorns of hate grew wild." We greet you in your own fitting words: "Our Country's Future. One heart, one hope, one destiny, one flag from sea to sea."

Sherwood was a fine German scholar and translated very much from that literature. Some of her poems appeared in German periodicals.

=== Social reformer ===
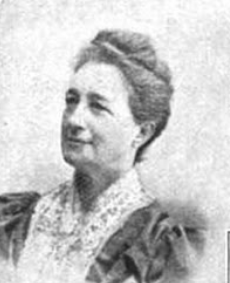
Kate Brownlee Sherwood (1895)

Sherwood was the organizer of the first auxiliary to the Grand Army of the Republic outside of New England, and was a founder in 1883 of the national association known as the Woman's Relief Corps, Auxiliary to the Grand Army of the Republic. She served that order as the first national senior vice-president and the second national president (1884–85), organized the department of relief and instituted the National Home for Army Nurses, in Geneva, Ohio.

== Personal life ==
The couple's son, James Brownlee Sherwood, was associated with the father in the publishing business. Their daughter was Lenore Sherwood.

Sherwood was a lifelong member of the Presbyterian Church. For many years, she made her home in Canton, Ohio.

Kate Brownlee Sherwood died at her home in Washington, D.C., on February 15, 1914, aged 72.

== Selected works ==
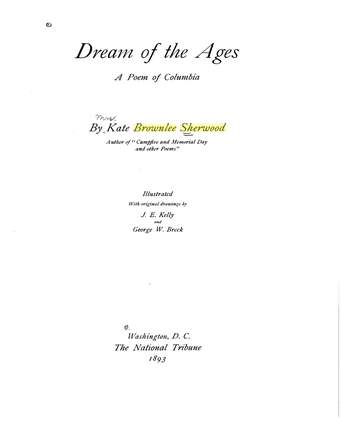
Dream of the Ages

- nd, Washington's birthday. Program for school children ... With national songs ...
- 1878, Poem written by Kate M. Sherwood, for Forsyth Post, No. 15, G.A.R. (Decoration Day,) Thursday, May 30th, 1878
- 1884, The Great Army. Written for the Grand Encampment Camp-fire, Grand Army of the Republic, at Minneapolis, July 22nd, 1884, and delivered by Elizabeth Mansfield Irving, Toledo, Ohio
- 1885, Camp-fire, Memorial-day, and other poems
- 1887, Memorial poem
- 1890, Lucy Webb Hayes
- 1890, Tableaux of states and ritual for teaching patriotism in the public schools : issued for co-operation with the patriotic teachers of America, to inculcate the principles of patriotism in the rising generation : and dedicated to commemorate the adoption of the American flag, June 14, 1777
- 1890, The Massachusetts woman : dedicated to my first Massachusetts associates in National Relief Corps work, E. Florence Barker, Sarah E. Fuller and Lizabeth A. Turner, and to the Relief Corps of Massachusetts
- 1893, Dream of the ages : a poem of Columbia, by Kate Brownlee Sherwood ... Original drawings ... by J.E. Kelly and George W. Breck
- 1894, Circumstances, 1894
- n.d., The Guard of States
- n.d., We Keep Memorial Day
