= Farm Progress =

American publisher of farming magazines

- Type: Media publishing
- Industry: Farming, ranching
- Founded: 1819
- Headquarters: St. Charles, Illinois, United States
- Parent: Informa
- Website: www.farmprogress.com

Farm Progress is the publisher of 22 farming and ranching magazines. The company's oldest publication began in 1819. Farm Progress Companies is owned by Informa.

Farm Progress has the oldest known continuously published magazine, Prairie Farmer, which was launched in 1841. The company publishes 18 regional magazines with local coverage of each agricultural community.

Farm Progress produces four annual farm shows including the Farm Progress Show, which launched in 1953.

== History ==
The company currently known as "Farm Progress" started in 1819 with the American Farmer magazine. Prairie Farmer started in 1841, followed by Wallaces Farmer in 1855, which helped chronicle the vast changes in Iowa agriculture as well as provide information to help farmers trim costs and boost profits. Three generations of the Wallace family, Henry Cantwell Wallace, Henry A. Wallace, and Henry Browne Wallace, owned and operated Wallaces' Farmer, which was then a newspaper.

The Farm Progress affiliate Prairie Farmer purchased radio station WLS from Sears in 1928 and operated it primarily as a service to farmers. The station moved to the Prairie Farmer Building on West Washington Street in Chicago, Illinois where it remained for 32 years.

In 1959, American Broadcasting-Paramount Theaters bought the Farm Progress Group, largely to acquire WLS and consolidate it with ABC station WENR. In 1986, ABC merged with Capital Cities. In 1991, Capital Cities/ABC acquired the farm magazines of Harcourt Brace Jovanovich. In 1996, the Disney Company purchased Capital Cities/ABC. In 1997, the Disney Company sold the Farm Progress Companies to Rural Press. Rural Press merged with Fairfax in 2007. In 2012, Fairfax sold Farm Progress to Penton Media. On November 2, 2016, Penton was bought by the UK based company Informa. Farm Progress and its publications were integrated into the Informa Markets Division.

== Current publications ==
Publication	Coverage
American Agriculturist	Northeastern United States
Carolina-Virginia Farmer	North Carolina, South Carolina, Virginia
Dakota Farmer	North Dakota, South Dakota
Farm Futures	United States (national coverage)
The Farmer	Minnesota
The Farmer-Stockman	New Mexico, Oklahoma, Texas
Indiana Prairie Farmer	Indiana
Kansas Farmer	Kansas
Michigan Farmer	Michigan
Mid-South Farmer	Arkansas, Louisiana, Mississippi
Missouri Ruralist	Missouri
Nebraska Farmer	Nebraska
The Ohio Farmer	Ohio
Prairie Farmer	Illinois
Southern Farmer	Southeastern United States
Wallaces Farmer	Iowa
Western Farm Press	California, Arizona
Western Farmer-Stockman	Northwestern United States
Wisconsin Agriculturist	Wisconsin

== Farm Progress Show ==
In 1953, Prairie Farmer teamed with WLS Radio in Chicago to host a field day where farmers could see first-hand the progress being made in farming equipment, along with seed varieties and agricultural chemicals.

In subsequent years, the show evolved to include seed test plots and field demonstrations. The show typically was held annually at different sites in Illinois, Iowa, and Indiana. As the event grew, it became apparent that temporary sites were inadequate to handle the large crowds and exhibits.

In 2005, a permanent biennial exhibit site was constructed near Decatur, Illinois which hosted its inaugural show in 2005. For the 2007 show, the site was expanded and upgraded with asphalt paved streets. This is one of two permanent biennial sites constructed to host the show.

Boone, Iowa, was selected for the show's second permanent biennial site. In 2008 the site hosted its first show at its newly constructed permanent biennial facility. The show now alternates between these two permanent sites on an annual basis. The Boone site is developed on about 600 acres (2.4 km^{2}) at the intersection of U.S. Highway 30 and Iowa Highway 17, while the Decatur site includes 640 acres (2.6 km^{2}) of exhibits and field demonstrations.

The Farm Progress Show is the oldest outdoor agricultural equipment exhibition in the United States, with more than 500 exhibitors. Farm Progress Companies does not release attendance figures, but the Decatur Convention & Visitors Bureau estimates attendance of at least 150,000 for the three days of the 2007 show.
