= Prairie Farmer =

Weekly agricultural newspaper

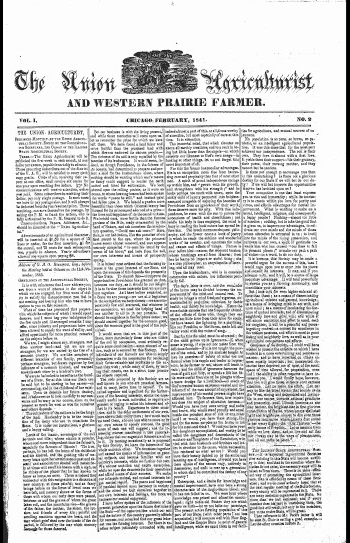
- Prairie Farmer, February 1, 1841
- Type: Weekly newspaper
- Owner: Farm Progress Company
- Publisher: Union Agricultural Society
- Founded: 1841
- Language: American English
- Headquarters: St. Charles, Illinois
- City: Chicago, Illinois
- Country: United States
- ISSN: 0032-6615
- OCLC number: 1714067
- Website: www.prairiefarmer.com

Prairie Farmer is a weekly newspaper which covers agricultural and rural news in the state of Illinois. It was first published in 1841 in Chicago, Illinois by John Stephen Wright and was called The Union Agriculturist and Western Prairie Farmer. Its original masthead proclaimed that it was devoted to "western agriculture, mechanics, and education." Prairie Farmer is owned by Farm Progress, a subsidiary of British publisher Informa.

== History ==
During his time as editor, Wright set up Prairie Farmer Warehouse at 112 Lake Street in Chicago where farmers could study samples of seed, plants, and farm machinery, as well as exhibit their own products. Upon its formation, Wright (not a farmer himself) proclaimed:

Upon you we must rely for the matter that is to make this paper interesting and valuable. No editorial skill can make it what the West demands; but if every practical farmer only feels an interest in the cause . . . . we may expect certain success. What we wish is this -- as soon as anyone obtains valuable agricultural information, a recipe a plan or any other matter....that he would sit down and communicate it immediately.

In January 1843, the name of the paper was shortened to Prairie Farmer by Wright.

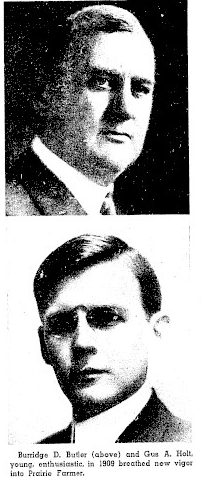
Burridge and Holt

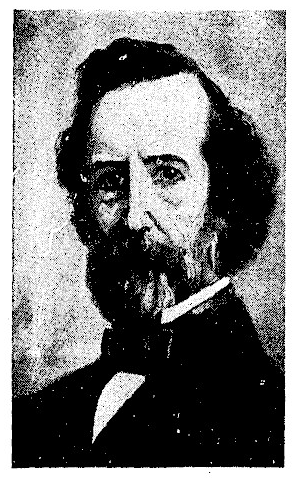
John Stephen Wright, 1841
