= Sarah Elizabeth Bierce =

American journalist (1838–1898)

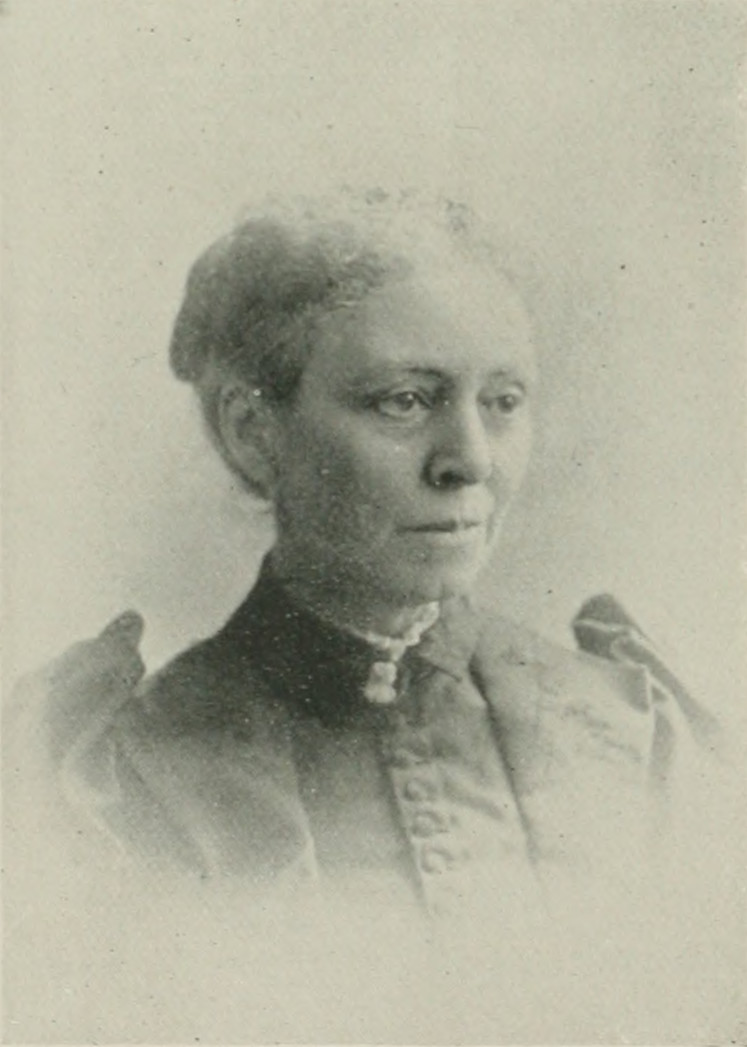
- "A Woman of the Century"
- Born: Sarah Elizabeth Holden; 1838; Sweden, Maine
- Died: 1898 (aged 59–60); Cleveland, OH
- Education: Kalamazoo College
- Occupation: journalist
- Known for: Woman's Press Club of Cleveland

Sarah Elizabeth Bierce (1838–1898) was an American journalist and educator who was a charter member of the Woman's Press Club of Cleveland.

== Early years and education ==
She was born Sarah Elizabeth Holden in Sweden, Maine, she attended primary school in New England later moving to Michigan and graduating from Kalamazoo College in 1860.

== Career ==
After graduating from college, for six years she taught in both public and private schools. While engaged in school work, she wrote plays, which were first used by her pupils and afterwards published. Dring her marriage from 1866, to her husband's death, in 1881, Bierce wrote little for the press.

In 1885, she worked with the Cleveland Plain Dealer, contributing stories and sketches of home life and pioneer incidents. She wrote accounts of her travel which included California, Arizona, Nevada and Utah.

She investigated certain phases of the working-woman problem, and she wrote articles on art subjects. She was a member of the Ohio Woman's Press Association and in 1892, was their corresponding secretary. In 1891, she was their delegate to the International League of Press Clubs, formed in Pittsburgh, Pennsylvania.

Bierce managed the women's literary and journalistic department of the Ohio Centennial, held in Columbus in 1888.

She died in October 1898 and is buried at Lake View Cemetery.
