= Alice Williams Brotherton =

American writer

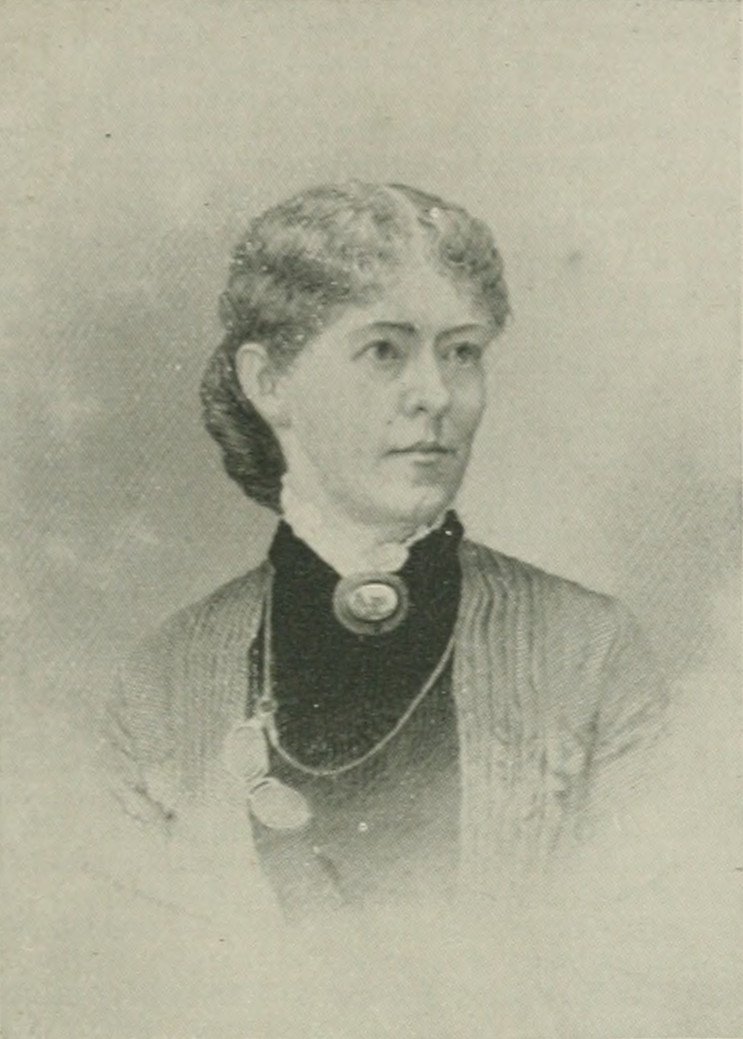
- "A Woman of the Century"
- Born: Alice Williams; April 4, 1848; Cambridge City, Indiana, U.S.
- Died: February 9, 1930 (aged 81); Cincinnati, Ohio, U.S.
- Education: St. Louis Eliot Grammar School; Woodward High School
- Occupation: author
- Spouse: William Ernest Brotherton (m. 1876)
- Writing career
- Genres: poetry; lyrics; essays; reviews; children's stories

Alice Williams Brotherton (née, Williams; April 4, 1848 – February 9, 1930) was an American author of poetry, essays, reviews, children's stories, and lyrics. Though she hailed from Indiana, she lived most of her life in Cincinnati, Ohio, serving as president of the Cincinnati Woman's Press Club. She wrote critical essays and addresses on Shakespeare, while many of her poems were set to music in the United States and in England. Contemporary poets of Ohio included Helen L. Bostwick and Kate Brownlee Sherwood.

== Early life and education ==
Alice Williams was born in Cambridge City, Indiana, April 4, 1848. Her parent were Ruth Dodge Johnson Williams and Alfred Baldwin Williams, of Cincinnati. Her family was of Welsh and English descent, with six generations on United States soil. Her father resided in Cincinnati, Ohio, and afterward in St. Louis, Missouri, then in Cambridge, Indiana, and again settled in Cincinnati.

Living as a child in an atmosphere of books, Brotherton was trained in composition at an early age by her mother. She was educated in various private schools, in the St. Louis Eliot Grammar School, and Woodward High School, of Cincinnati, graduating from that institution in 1870.

== Career ==
What can you say of a life so sequestered as mine except, 'She is born, is married, will die'; 'Story, God bless you I have none to tell.' I was born in Cambridge, Indiana, but have passed most of my life in Cincinnati, and have never been east of the Blue Ridge Mountains. As to my 'versing' that began soon after I was out of school. I think it was in 1872 I first sent my poems out to seek their fortune. -A. W. Brotherton

Brotherton's first appearance in print was in 1872. Though her specialty was poetry, she wrote considerable prose in the form of essays, reviews and children's stories. Her work showed a wide range of feeling and a deep insight into varying phases of life. Writing only in the spare moments of a busy home life, she contributed at intervals to a variety of periodicals, including The Century Magazine, Scribner's Magazine, The Atlantic Monthly, St. Nicholas Magazine, Poet Lore, and The New York Independent, as well as various religious journals.

She was the author of three published volumes: Beyond the Veil (poems, 1886); The Sailing of King Olaf, and Other Poems, (1887); and What the Wind Told the Tree-Tops (prose and verse for children, 1888). A number of her lyrics, among which are those entitled "Rosenlied," "The Song of Fleeting Love," "The Fisher-Wife's Lullabye," "Unawares," "Boys, Keep the Colors Up," "God Knows," and "June Roses," were set to music, in the U.S. and in England.

From 1892, she devoted much of her time to the preparation of critical essays and addresses on Shakespeare, the drama, and other literary topics, delivering numerous lectures before study clubs, women's clubs, and dramatic schools.

She served several times as president of the Cincinnati Woman's Press Club.

== Personal life ==
On October 18, 1876, she married William Ernest Brotherton (1851–1949), of Cincinnati. They had three children, two sons and one daughter; the older son died in 1890, at the age of eleven. Brotherton was a non-conservative Unitarian.

Alice Williams Brotherton died in Cincinnati, February 9, 1930.

== Selected works ==
Beyond the veil

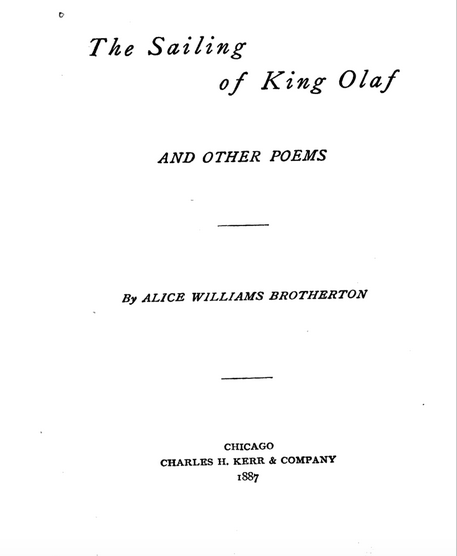
The Sailing of King Olaf

- 1886, Beyond the veil
- 1887, What the wind told to the tree-tops
- 1887, The sailing of King Olaf : and other poems
- 1894, The buckeye song
- 1895, New year's eve
- ca. 1900–1920, Heap high the board with plenteous cheer
- 1905, The real Hamlet and the Hamlet oldest of all
- n.d., Debasing the Poetic Coinage the Quality and Function of Poetry
- n.d., "Debasing the Poetic Coinage". Part II: The "New Movement" in America
- n.d., The talisman
