= Brooklyn Heights, Ohio =

- Village
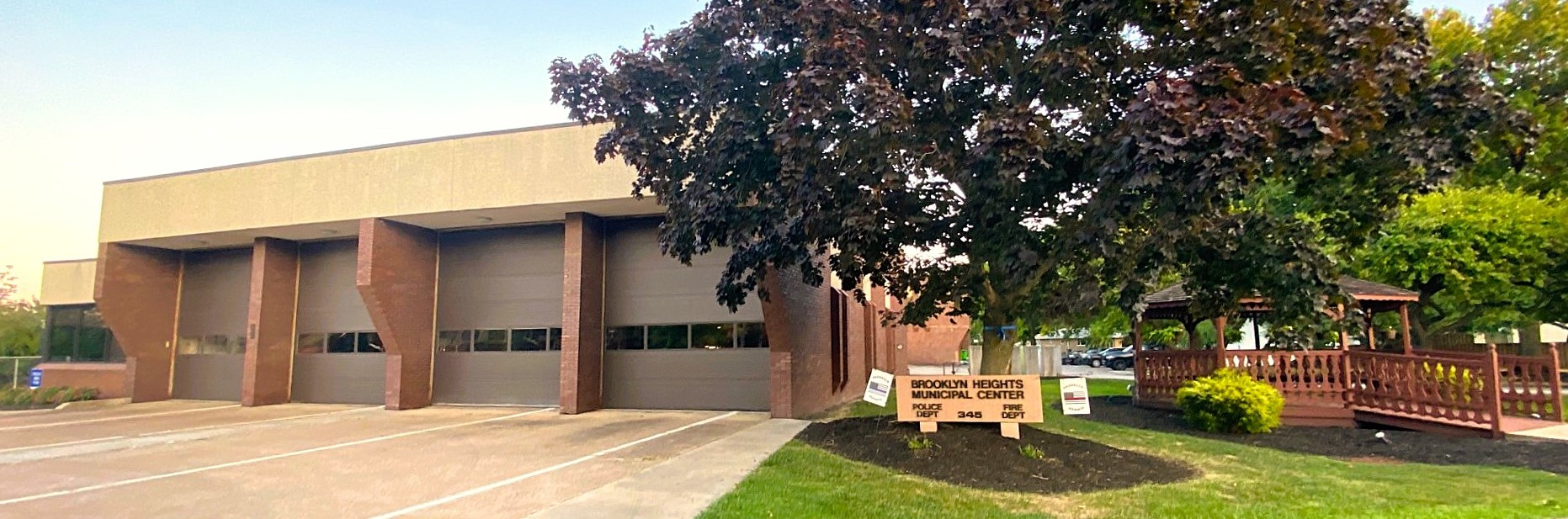
- Municipal Center Fire Department

- Logo
- Interactive map of Brooklyn Heights, Ohio
- Location within Ohio Location within the United States
- Coordinates: 41°25′2″N 81°40′20″W
- Country: United States
- State: Ohio
- County: Cuyahoga

Government
  - Type: Mayor-Council
  - Mayor: Michael S. Procuk (D)
  - Council President Pro Tempore: Mark E. Lasky

Area
  - Total: 1.81 sq mi (4.69 km^{2})
  - Land: 1.79 sq mi (4.64 km^{2})
  - Water: 0.019 sq mi (0.05 km^{2})
- Elevation: 768 ft (234 m)

Population (2020)
  - Total: 1,519
  - Estimate (2023): 1,476
  - Density: 847.5/sq mi (327.21/km^{2})
- Time zone: UTC-5 (Eastern (EST))
  - Summer (DST): UTC-4 (EDT)
- ZIP codes: 44109, 44131
- Area code: 216
- FIPS code: 39-09274
- GNIS feature ID: 1048555
- Website: brooklynhts.org

Brooklyn Heights is a village in Cuyahoga County, Ohio, United States. The population was 1,519 at the 2020 census. A suburb of Cleveland, it is a part of the Cleveland metropolitan area.

== Geography ==
According to the United States Census Bureau, the village has a total area of 1.76 square miles (4.56 km^{2}), of which 1.74 square miles (4.51 km^{2}) is land and 0.02 square miles (0.05 km^{2}) is water. The southern part of the city is dominated by a heavily wooded valley with a creek running through the middle of it. Otherwise, the remainder of Brooklyn Heights is developed land, consisting primarily of detached housing.

Brooklyn Heights is the location of the Cleveland office of the National Weather Service.

== Demographics ==
Historical population
Census	Pop.	Note	%±
1910	400		—
1920	605		51.3%
1930	413		−31.7%
1940	496		20.1%
1950	931		87.7%
1960	1,449		55.6%
1970	1,527		5.4%
1980	1,653		8.3%
1990	1,450		−12.3%
2000	1,558		7.4%
2010	1,543		−1.0%
2020	1,519		−1.6%
2023 (est.)	1,476	▼	−2.8%
U.S. Decennial Census

=== 2020 census ===
Brooklyn Heights village, Ohio – Racial and ethnic composition Note: the US Census treats Hispanic/Latino as an ethnic category. This table excludes Latinos from the racial categories and assigns them to a separate category. Hispanics/Latinos may be of any race.
Race / Ethnicity (NH = Non-Hispanic)	Pop 2000	Pop 2010	Pop 2020	% 2000	% 2010	% 2020
White alone (NH)	1,504	1,441	1,351	96.53%	93.39%	88.94%
Black or African American alone (NH)	11	17	25	0.71%	1.10%	1.65%
Native American or Alaska Native alone (NH)	2	1	4	0.13%	0.06%	0.26%
Asian alone (NH)	11	26	36	0.71%	1.69%	2.37%
Native Hawaiian or Pacific Islander alone (NH)	0	0	0	0.00%	0.00%	0.00%
Other race alone (NH)	0	0	1	0.00%	0.00%	0.07%
Mixed race or Multiracial (NH)	9	20	37	0.58%	1.30%	2.44%
Hispanic or Latino (any race)	21	38	65	1.35%	2.46%	4.28%
Total	1,558	1,543	1,519	100.00%	100.00%	100.00%

=== 2010 census ===
As of the census of 2010, there were 1,543 people, 595 households, and 436 families living in the village. The population density was 886.8 inhabitants per square mile (342.4/km^{2}). There were 624 housing units at an average density of 358.6 per square mile (138.5/km^{2}). The racial makeup of the village was 94.6% White, 1.2% African American, 0.6% Native American, 1.7% Asian, 0.4% from other races, and 1.6% from two or more races. Hispanic or Latino of any race were 2.5% of the population.

There were 595 households, of which 32.3% had children under the age of 18 living with them, 55.8% were married couples living together, 13.4% had a female householder with no husband present, 4.0% had a male householder with no wife present, and 26.7% were non-families. 23.5% of all households were made up of individuals, and 12.5% had someone living alone who was 65 years of age or older. The average household size was 2.58 and the average family size was 3.06.

The median age in the village was 43.6 years. 23.7% of residents were under the age of 18; 7.5% were between the ages of 18 and 24; 20.8% were from 25 to 44; 30.9% were from 45 to 64; and 17.1% were 65 years of age or older. The gender makeup of the village was 47.2% male and 52.8% female.

=== 2000 census ===
As of the census of 2000, there were 1,558 people, 594 households, and 437 families living in the village. The population density was 878.7 inhabitants per square mile (339.3/km^{2}). There were 607 housing units at an average density of 342.3 per square mile (132.2/km^{2}). The racial makeup of the village was 97.30% White, 0.77% African American, 0.13% Native American, 0.71% Asian, 0.51% from other races, and 0.58% from two or more races. Hispanic or Latino of any race were 1.35% of the population.

There were 594 households, out of which 31.8% had children under the age of 18 living with them, 59.3% were married couples living together, 10.8% had a female householder with no husband present, and 26.3% were non-families. 23.2% of all households were made up of individuals, and 13.5% had someone living alone who was 65 years of age or older. The average household size was 2.60 and the average family size was 3.08.

In the village, the population was spread out, with 24.8% under the age of 18, 5.5% from 18 to 24, 26.3% from 25 to 44, 25.2% from 45 to 64, and 18.3% who were 65 years of age or older. The median age was 42 years. For every 100 females there were 92.8 males. For every 100 females age 18 and over, there were 89.3 males.

The median income for a household in the village was $47,847, and the median income for a family was $62,424. Males had a median income of $50,689 versus $33,182 for females. The per capita income for the village was $27,012. About 1.5% of families and 2.2% of the population were below the poverty line, including none of those under age 18 and 8.7% of those age 65 or over.

== Government ==
Brooklyn Heights employs a standard council-based municipal government, which as of October 1, 2021, consisted of the following positions and occupants:

- Mayor: Michael S. Procuk
- Council (of 5 members):
  - Joe Blados
  - Ray Berzins
  - Mark Lasky
  - Jennifer Presot - President Pro Tem
  - Matt Walsh
