= Home Monthly =

Home Monthly was a monthly women's magazine published in Pittsburgh, Pennsylvania in the late 19th century.

When Home Monthly was established in 1896, it hired Willa Cather as the managing editor of the magazine. Cather oversaw the publication of 12 issues of the magazine between June 1896 and July 1897. A number of Cather's short stories were published in the magazine during her tenure. (Bradley, 2005)

Home Monthly ceased publication in 1900.

== Contributors ==
- Helen Louisa Bostwick Bird

== Sources ==
- Jennifer L. Bradley, "To Entertain, To Educate, To Elevate: Cather and the Commodification of Manners at the Home Monthly" in Janis T. Stout (ed., 2005). Willa Cather & Material Culture: Real-World Writing, Writing the Real World (Tuscaloosa: University of Alabama Press, ISBN 978-0-8173-1436-1) pp. 37–65.
