= Interstate 80N (Ohio) =

Former highway in Ohio

Interstate 80N

Route information
- Existed: 1960–1962

Major junctions
- West end: I-80 / I-90 / Ohio Turnpike near Milan
- I-90 from Elyria to Cleveland; I-290 in Cleveland; I-77 in Cleveland; I-480 near Maple Heights; I-271 from Warrensville Heights to Northfield; Ohio Turnpike in Streetsboro
- East end: I-80 near Ravenna

Location
- Country: United States
- State: Ohio

Highway system
- Interstate Highway System; Main; Auxiliary; Suffixed; Business; Future; Ohio State Highway System; Interstate; US; State; Scenic

Current and once-planned Interstates near Cleveland; I-80 would have run via Akron, using what is now I-76 east of Akron

Interstate 80N is a former designation in Ohio. It ran along what is now the following highways (Italics denote never-built roads):

I-90 / Ohio Turnpike from near Milan to Elyria
I-90 alone from Elyria to Cleveland
I-490 The entire length of I-490
I-290 A short portion of unbuilt I-290
I-80N A section of unbuilt highway connecting to Interstate 480
I-480 from Maple Heights to I-480's east terminus
I-80N A section of unbuilt highway connecting to mainline I-80, which is now Interstate 76
I-76 / I-80 Interstate 80N ended at a junction with the mainline route of I-80 around Ravenna. The road at which I-80N ended is now Interstate 76.

== See also ==
- List of Interstate Highways in Ohio
