= Opportunity Corridor =

Urban boulevard in Cleveland, OH

State Route 10
- Opportunity Corridor Boulevard

Route information
- Existed: 2008–present

Major junctions
- West end: I-490 / I-77 in Cleveland
- US 422 / SR 8; SR 87; US 20
- East end: US 322 in Cleveland

Location
- Country: United States
- State: Ohio
- Counties: Cuyahoga

Highway system
- Ohio State Highway System; Interstate; US; State; Scenic

The Opportunity Corridor, officially the "Carl and Louis Stokes Opportunity Corridor" for native politicians and brothers Carl and Louis Stokes, is a linear project in Cleveland, Ohio, with a boulevard that connects Interstate 77 (I-77) and I-490 to the University Circle neighborhood. "The purpose of the project is to improve the roadway network within a historically under-served, economically depressed area within the City of Cleveland." The road through the corridor, Opportunity Corridor Boulevard, carries Ohio State Route 10.

== History ==
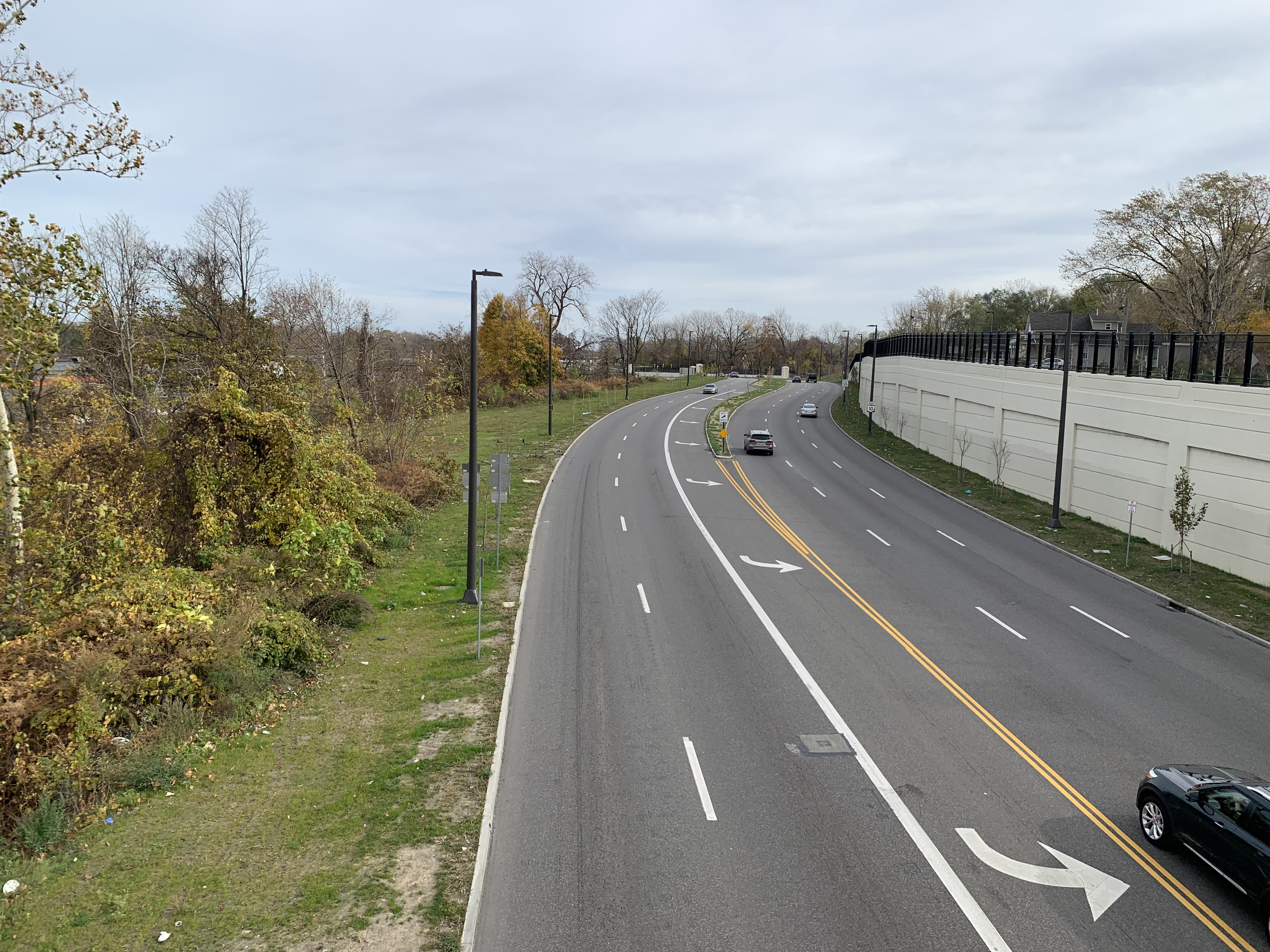
Opportunity Corridor near East 55th Street

In the 1960s, Cuyahoga County had planned to build a freeway called the Clark Freeway in Cleveland and its environs, part of a network of planned freeways. The entirety of I-490, along with a portion of what later became I-90 westward from I-490's western terminus, was built as a result of this project. However, the road was initially proposed to extend to the Outerbelt East Freeway (I-271). The route was ultimately truncated to East 55th Street as a result of freeway revolts.

Later plans for a highway along this general routing included a plan to build a freeway northeastward from East 55th Street to the Cleveland Memorial Shoreway (I-90 and State Route 2), but this plan was rejected in 2002. The route was again proposed by Ken Blackwell during his failed bid for governor in 2006.

The road as built, part of the Ohio Department of Transportation's Innerbelt reconstruction project with additional funding from the Ohio Turnpike and Infrastructure Commission, is a boulevard connecting I-490 to the University Circle neighborhood. This iteration was conceived in 2008, though references to it existed as early as 2003; its record of decision was issued in May 2014. Construction began in March 2015 along the portion east of East 93rd Street; this portion opened in two segments in late 2017 and November 2018. After various delays, the last section opened November 12, 2021.

The project was estimated in April 2013 to cost $331.3 million by the Federal Highway Administration, or about $100 million per mile.

As of 2023, several building projects were underway along the boulevard.

=== Opposition ===
The Opportunity Corridor has a number of opponents, including a grassroots group, Clevelanders for Transportation Equity. Many of the objections are rooted in the upheaval of the local community, which is predominantly lower income and African-American.

Other local critiques include a report by the Cleveland Urban Design Collaborative in which concerns are raised regarding a lack of comprehensive vision, lack of meaningful community engagement, poorly designed green infrastructure, and the absence of true multi-modal integration.

The Opportunity Corridor was also featured in a report by the United States Public Interest Research Group titled, "Highway Boondoggles: Wasted Money and America’s Transportation Future". This report highlights ODOT's poor enforcement of their “fix-it-first” policy as well as the stagnant Vehicle Miles Traveled statistics for the region in contrast with the increased ridership on the Regional Transit Authority.

== Major intersections ==
The entire route is in Cleveland, Cuyahoga County.

mi	km	Destinations	Notes
0.0	0.0	I-490 west (Troy Lee James Highway) to I-77 / I-90	Continuation beyond western terminus
0.0	0.0	Quadrant Road (to East 55th Street)	Western terminus; one-quadrant interchange
		US 422 / SR 8 (Kinsman Road)	
		SR 87 (Buckeye Road)	
		Quincy Avenue	Runs along East 105th Street beyond this junction
		US 20 (Euclid Avenue)	
		US 322 (Chester Avenue)	Eastern terminus
1.000 mi = 1.609 km; 1.000 km = 0.621 mi
