= Ohio State Route 77 =

State Route 77

Route information
- Maintained by ODOT

Location
- Country: United States
- State: Ohio

Highway system
- Ohio State Highway System; Interstate; US; State; Scenic
| ← I-77 | → SR 78 |

In Ohio, State Route 77 may refer to:

- Interstate 77 in Ohio, the only Ohio highway numbered 77 since about 1962
- Ohio State Route 77 (1923), now SR 60 (Marietta to near Millersburg) and SR 754 (near Millersburg to near Shreve)
