= Beachcliff Market Square =

Mixed-use open air center in Ohio

Coordinates: 41°28′58″N 81°50′15″W

Beachcliff Market Square is a mixed-use open air center situated off of Interstate 90 in Rocky River, Ohio, a suburb outside of Cleveland.

Beachcliff Market Square, the 110,000-square-foot (10,000 m^{2}) shopping center, was built in 1983 and was renovated in October 1988 to support more tenants. The center was redeveloped in November 2006 under Jeffrey R. Anderson Real Estate, Inc. and was later acquired by Madison Marquette in October 1998. Offerings from Beachcliff Market Square range from spa and salons to retail to family dentistry. The center has been growing and opened an additional three retailers in December 2010 including Girls Got Swing (a women's golf shop), Bella Bridesmaid, and Mellow Yellow (a women's accessory shop).

A defining feature of Beachcliff Market Square is the art deco Beachcliff Theater that is considered a Rocky River landmark. Beachcliff Theater was built in August 1937 and closed in the mid-1970s and reconfigured in 1985 for use as the Beachcliff Market Square Mall which has been closed since. The space was last redesigned in 2007 and how houses The Burntwood Tavern and the marquee is still lit nightly and is used for center advertising.
