= Interstate 490 (Ohio) =

Highway in Ohio

Interstate 490
- Troy Lee James Highway
- I-490 highlighted in red

Route information
- Auxiliary route of I-90
- Maintained by ODOT
- Length: 2.43 mi (3.91 km)
- History: Designated in 1973; Completed in 1990
- NHS: Entire route

Major junctions
- West end: I-71 / I-90 in Cleveland
- I-77 in Cleveland
- East end: SR 10 in Cleveland

Location
- Country: United States
- State: Ohio
- Counties: Cuyahoga

Highway system
- Interstate Highway System; Main; Auxiliary; Suffixed; Business; Future; Ohio State Highway System; Interstate; US; State; Scenic
← I-480	→ SR 500
← SR 289	→ SR 290

Interstate 490 (I-490) is a 2.43-mile (3.91 km) auxiliary Interstate Highway in Cleveland, Ohio. The western terminus is a junction with I-90 and I-71 on Cleveland's west side. After spanning the Cuyahoga River, I-490 reaches its eastern terminus at a junction with East 55th Street, just east of I-77, at which point drivers continue onto Opportunity Corridor/Ohio State Route 10.

== Route description ==
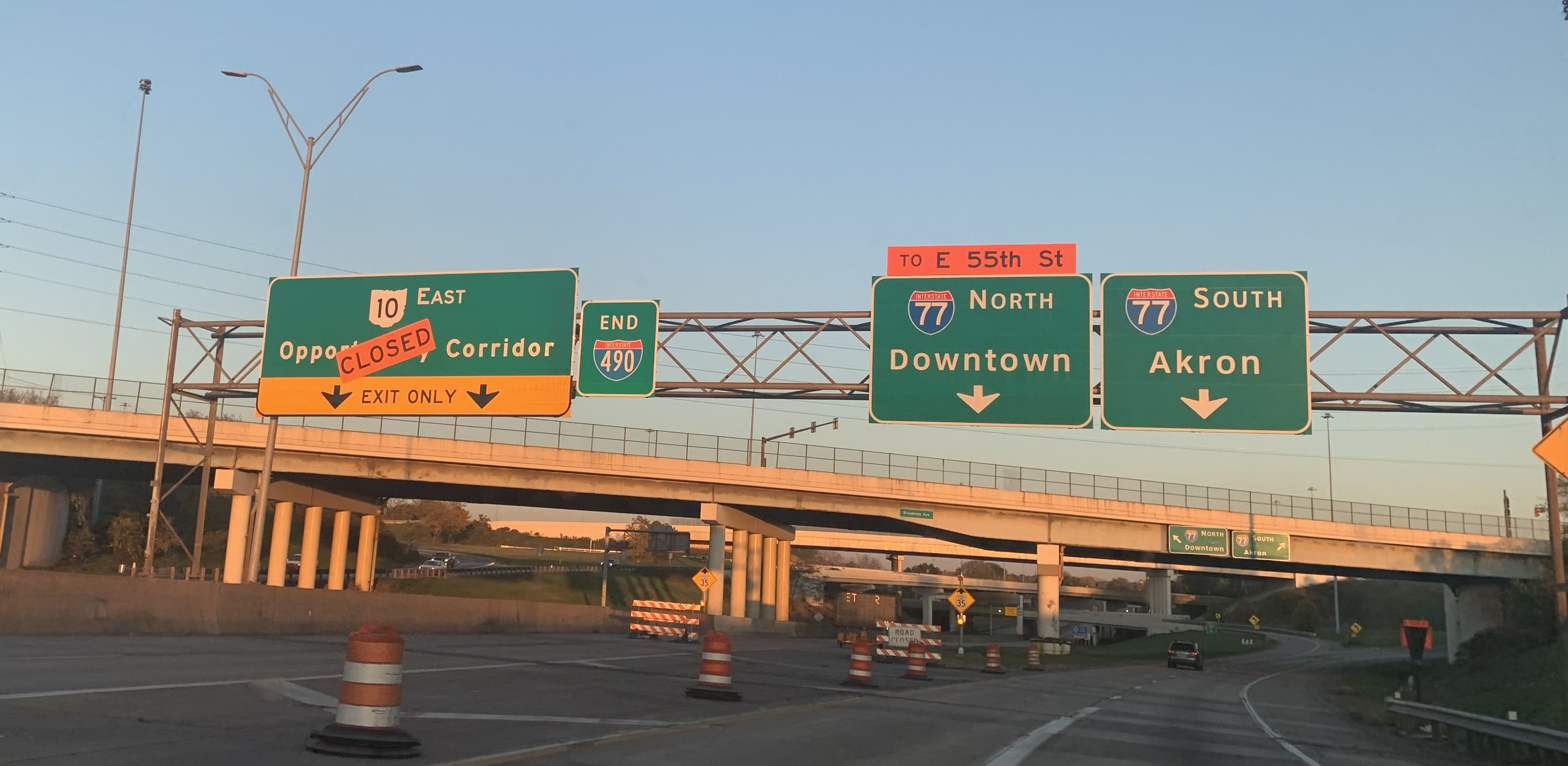
Eastern terminus of I-490, meeting with I-77 and the now-opened Opportunity Corridor

I-490 begins at a partial stack interchange with I-90/I-71 in the Cleveland neighborhood of Tremont. This interchange does not provide access from westbound I-490 to eastbound I-90 as well as from westbound I-90 to eastbound I-490. The Interstate then meets West 7th Street in an incomplete partial cloverleaf interchange. The freeway then crosses over industries, railroads, and the Cuyahoga River. After that, the freeway meets State Route 14 (SR 14) and, at a stack interchange, I-77/SR 10. While I-490 ends at this particular stack interchange, the roadway, which becomes at-grade at East 55th Street, continues east as SR 10 (Opportunity Corridor) all the way toward University Circle.

== History ==
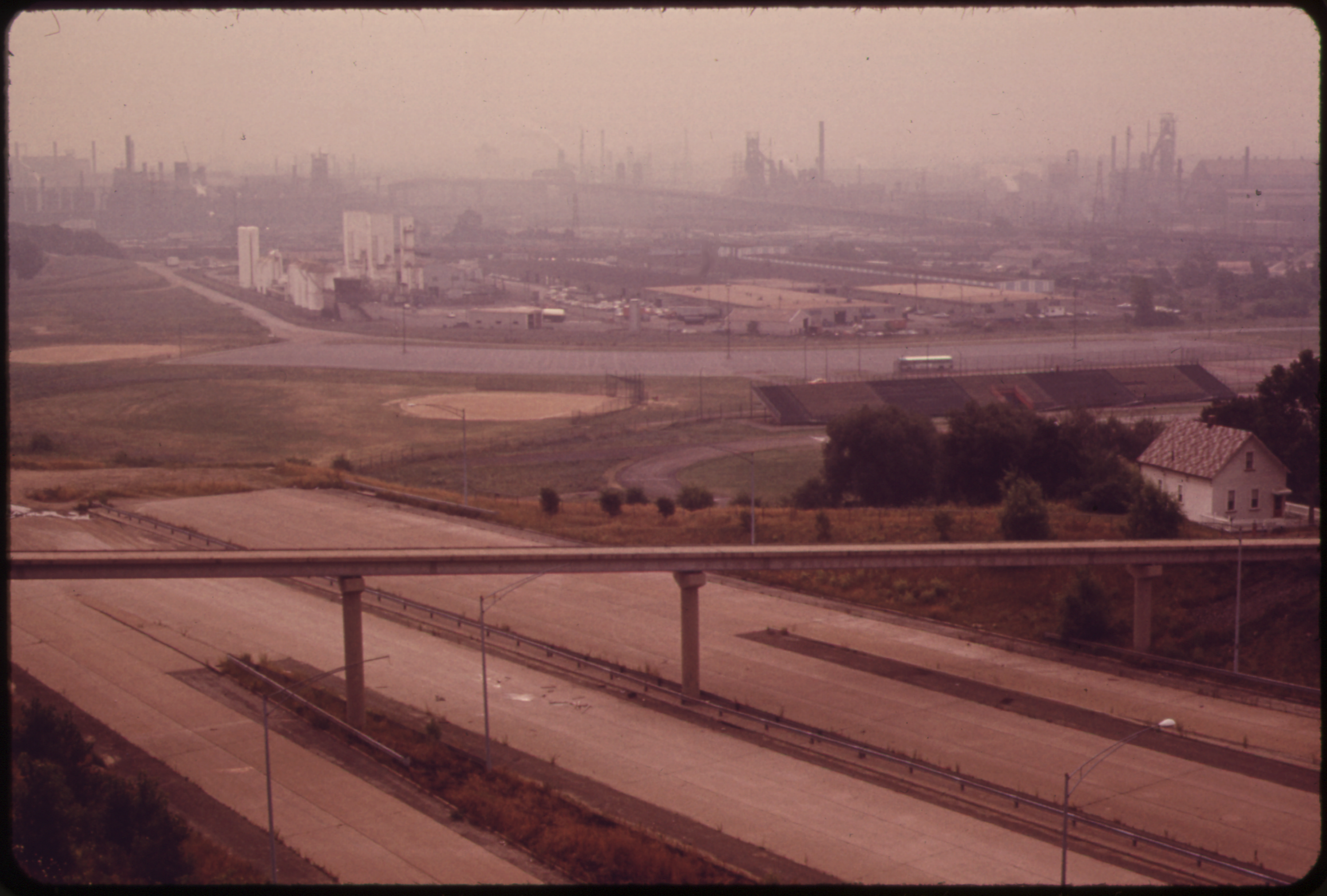
Incomplete I-490 in Cleveland, looking east from West 14th Street in July 1973

The original plans of the Cleveland and other city and federal highway authorities called for the highway—also known as the Clark Freeway and, at various times and in various sections, as I-80N and Interstate 290 (I-290)—to bisect the east side of the city and the eastern suburbs; the I-290 designation would then have continued north along I-271. I-71 was to have continued along the innerbelt to Dead Man's Curve, while I-290 was to have used the portion of present I-90 westward to the Parma Freeway near West 65th Street. Freeway revolts in the late 1960s prevented the Clark Freeway east of East 55th Street and the Parma Freeway from being built; specifically, a referendum in Shaker Heights barred the city from allowing the Clark Freeway to pass through the city and its Shaker Lakes. The I-490 designation was applied to the Clark Freeway's altered proposed path in 1973, but this alignment was also not built east of East 55th Street, being cancelled in 1979. Ultimately, I-90 was realigned to follow the Clark Freeway routing west of I-71 and the innerbelt, and the middle segment of the Clark Freeway between I-71 and I-77 opened in 1990. The Opportunity Corridor expressway was constructed in the late 2010s and early 2020s to follow the path of the canceled portion of I-490/Clark Freeway eastward from East 55th Street until it veers north toward the University Circle neighborhood.

In 2003, I-490 was dedicated to Troy Lee James, former member of the Ohio House of Representatives.

In April 2011, the ramps between I-77 and I-90 to and from the west were removed, making I-490 the official route between those highways and between I-77 and I-71.

== Exit list ==
The entire route is in Cleveland, Cuyahoga County.

mi	km	Exit	Destinations	Notes
0.00	0.00	—	I-90 west – Toledo	Western terminus; I-90 exit 170C
0.20	0.32	1A	I-71 south / SR 176 south – Columbus	Westbound exit and eastbound entrance; I-71 exit 247B
0.92	1.48	1B	West 7th Street / Houston Avenue	Westbound exit and eastbound entrance
1.72	2.77	2A	SR 14 / SR 43 (Broadway)	Eastbound exit and westbound entrance
1.88	3.03	—	I-77 / SR 10 west – Downtown Cleveland, Akron	Exit 161 on I-77; western terminus of SR 10 concurrency
		—	SR 10 east (Opportunity Corridor)	Ramp connection to East 55th Street
1.000 mi = 1.609 km; 1.000 km = 0.621 mi: Concurrency terminus; Incomplete access
