= Interstate 90 in Ohio =

Highway in Ohio

Interstate 90
- I-90 highlighted in red

Route information
- Maintained by OTIC and ODOT
- Length: 244.75 mi (393.89 km)
- Existed: 1956–present
- NHS: Entire route

Major junctions
- West end: I-80 Toll / I-90 Toll / Indiana Toll Road at the Indiana state line near Montpelier
- I-75 in Rossford; I-280 / SR 420 in Lake Township; I-80 Toll / Ohio Turnpike in Elyria Township; I-71 / I-490 / SR 176 in Cleveland; I-77 in Cleveland; I-271 in Willoughby Hills; SR 44 in Concord Township; SR 11 near Ashtabula
- East end: I-90 at the Pennsylvania state line near Conneaut

Location
- Country: United States
- State: Ohio
- Counties: Williams, Fulton, Lucas, Wood, Ottawa, Sandusky, Erie, Lorain, Cuyahoga, Lake, Ashtabula

Highway system
- Interstate Highway System; Main; Auxiliary; Suffixed; Business; Future; Ohio State Highway System; Interstate; US; State; Scenic
← SR 89	→ SR 90

Interstate 90 (I-90) runs east–west across the northern tier of the US state of Ohio. Much of it is along the Ohio Turnpike, but sections outside the turnpike pass through Cleveland and northeast into Pennsylvania.

The entire free section of I-90 in Ohio is called the "AMVETS Highway". Selected stretches are named for various individuals. In Greater Cleveland, portions of I-90 carry various names, such as the Innerbelt Freeway, Cleveland Memorial Shoreway, Lakeland Freeway, and Euclid Spur.

== Route description ==
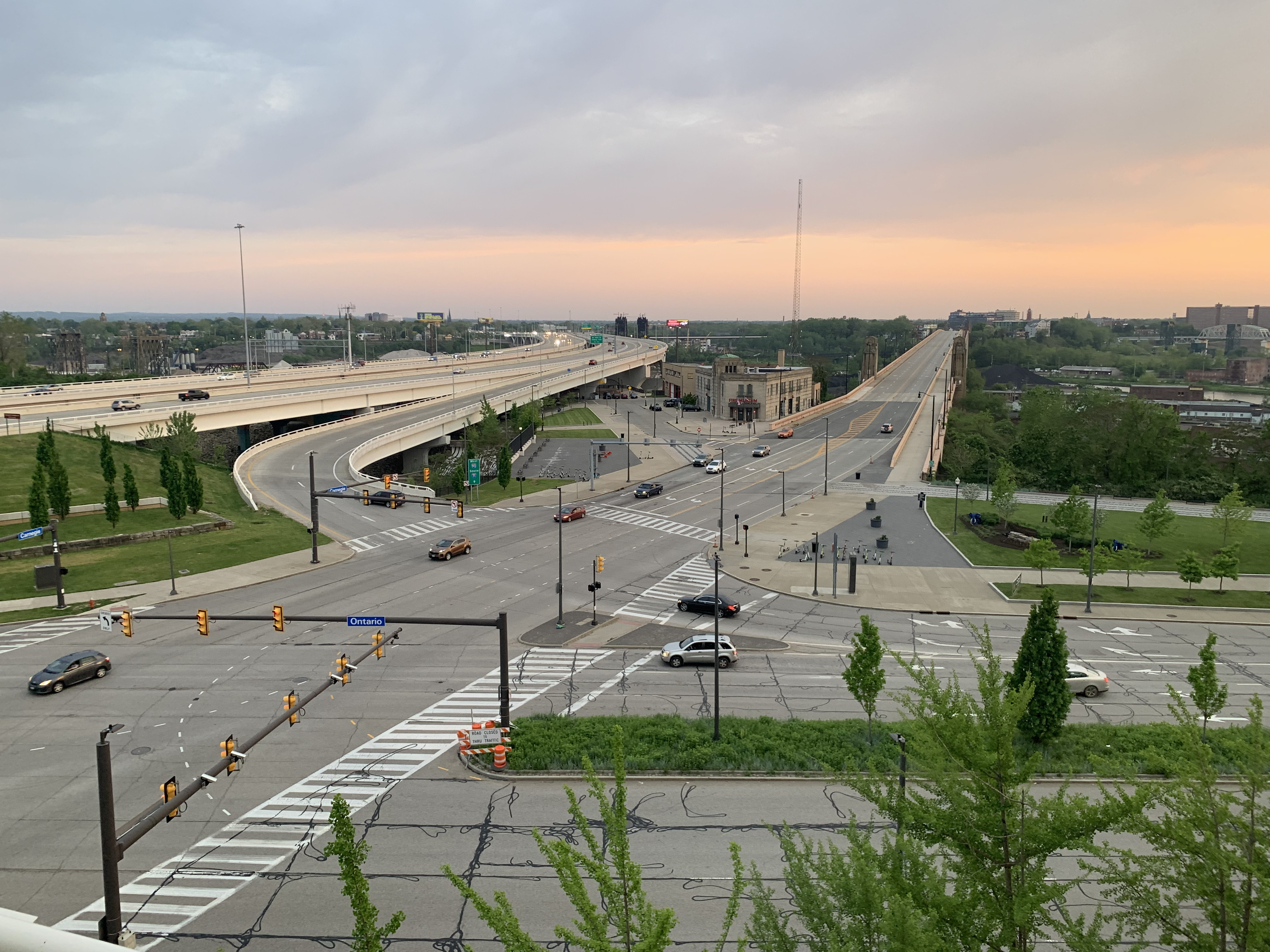
The George V. Voinovich Bridges in Downtown Cleveland, 2022

In the western half of Ohio, I-90 is jointly signed with the Ohio Turnpike/I-80. The Ohio Turnpike/I-90 connector (designated exit 8A, now exit 142) was built in Lorain County in Amherst Township and Elyria Township in 1975.

From the exit east, I-90/State Route 2 (SR 2) travels east along the south shore of Lake Erie through Cuyahoga County to Downtown Cleveland. SR 2 separates from I-90 at Detroit Road in Rocky River. I-90 crosses the Cuyahoga River via the George V. Voinovich Bridges, which replaced the Innerbelt Bridge in 2013 (westbound) through 2016 (eastbound), into Downtown Cleveland and intersects I-77. The innerbelt continues around Downtown Cleveland to a sharp east turn, nicknamed "Dead Man's Curve" for its frequent crashes. I-90 then follows the East Shoreway northeastward along the lakeshore toward Euclid, again cosigned with SR 2. I-90 separates from SR 2 in Euclid and passes through Lake County, eventually crossing over the Grand River. Finally, I-90 enters Ashtabula County as it continues to travel northeast towards the Pennsylvania state line in Conneaut.

US Route 20 (US 20) parallels I-90 throughout Ohio, as it does in all locations from Illinois eastward; US 6 also parallels I-90 to a lesser extent throughout the state. East of I-271, SR 84 and SR 307 also closely parallel I-90. These routes are usually easily accessible from I-90's interchanges.

== History ==
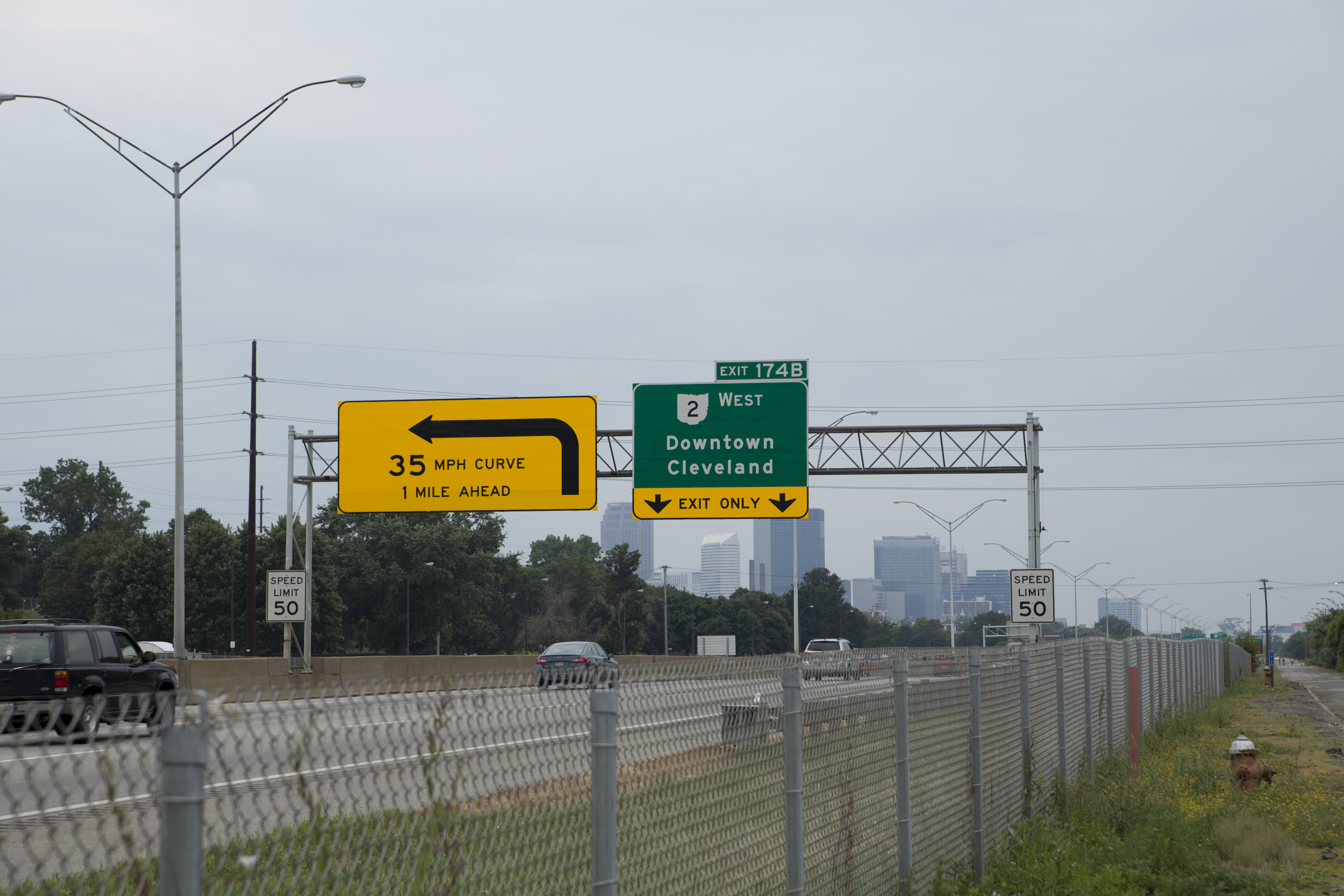
Warning sign for Dead Man's Curve

The very first portion of I-90 in Ohio was built in 1935. This portion was a part of the Cleveland Memorial Shoreway, running from East 9th Street to East 55th Street. The year 1938 saw the addition of an eastward expansion to the Illuminating Company plant, which was within close proximity of Gordon Park. The interchange with East 9th Street was completed in 1940. 1941 saw an addition of the freeway, running between the former terminus at Gordon Park, to East 140th Street in Cleveland. The westernmost part of I-90 in Ohio was built from 1952 to 1955, with the construction of the Ohio Turnpike. The Innerbelt Freeway was built in 1959 and was the main freeway that ran through Cleveland. I-90 opened between SR 528 in Madison and SR 7 in Conneaut on December 15, 1959, and between SR 44 in Concord Township and SR 528 in Madison on June 30, 1960. A part of I-90 running from East 140th Street to the Lakeland Freeway split was built in 1962, with the construction of the Lakeland Freeway. The part connecting the Lakeland Freeway and I-271, the Euclid Spur, was built in the mid-1960s. From the mid-1960s to 1978, the part of I-90 running from the Ohio Turnpike in Lorain County to the interchange with I-71 and what is now I-490 was built. The final section of that part of the road opened on November 4 of that year.

The Innerbelt in Cleveland previously used a steel-gusset cantilever truss bridge of the same design as the I-35W Mississippi River bridge that failed in Minneapolis, Minnesota, in 2007. Construction of a new crossing, the George V. Voinovich Bridges, began in 2011. It includes two parallel bridges, one for each direction of traffic; the westbound bridge opened in 2013, while the eastbound bridge opened in 2016 on the site of the Innerbelt Bridge.

A variable speed limit was applied to I-90, the first in the state, between SR 44 and SR 528 in Lake County in 2017 after a change in state law, with a westward extension to SR 306 in 2026.

A six-year project to modernize the Innerbelt in the vicinity of I-77 began in 2026.

== Exit list ==
County	Location	mi	km	Old exit	New exit	Destinations	Notes
Williams	Northwest Township	0.00	0.00			I-80 Toll west / I-90 Toll west / Indiana Toll Road west – Chicago	Continuation into Indiana
Williams	Northwest Township	1.67– 2.47	2.69– 3.98	—	2	SR 49 – Edon, Edgerton	Diamond interchange with no ramp tolls, opened December 29, 1992
Williams	Northwest Township	4.0	6.4	Westgate Toll Barrier			
Williams	Holiday City	13.18– 13.50	21.21– 21.73	2	13	SR 15 – Bryan, Montpelier	Last westbound exit before toll; US 20A not listed on signage
Williams	Brady Township	20.8	33.5	Indian Meadow Service Plaza (westbound); Tiffin River Service Plaza (eastbound)			
Fulton	Franklin Township	25.50– 25.90	41.04– 41.68	2A	25	SR 66 – Archbold, Fayette	Opened November 13, 1998
Fulton	Dover Township	34.64– 35.20	55.75– 56.65	3	34	SR 108 – Wauseon	
Fulton	Pike Township	39.48– 40.05	63.54– 64.45	3B	39	SR 109 – Delta, Lyons	Opened December 20, 1996; last eastbound exit before toll
Lucas	Swanton Township	49.0	78.9	Oak Openings Service Plaza (westbound); Fallen Timbers Service Plaza (eastbound); Demolished (Note: Demolished in 2011; no plans to rebuild)			
Lucas	Swanton Township	49.0	78.9	Swanton Toll Barrier (western end of ticket system)			
Lucas	Monclova Township	52.50– 52.82	84.49– 85.01	3A	52	SR 2 – Swanton, Toledo Airport	Opened November 21, 1991
Lucas	Maumee	59.42– 59.73	95.63– 96.13	4	59	US 20 to I-475 / US 23 – Maumee, Toledo, Ann Arbor	
Wood	Rossford	64.71– 65.14	104.14– 104.83	4A	64	I-75 – Toledo, Dayton	Opened December 4, 1991; I-75 exit 195
Wood	Lake Township	71.60– 72.15	115.23– 116.11	5	71	I-280 north / SR 420 south – Toledo, Detroit, Stony Ridge	I-280 exit 1A; southern terminus of I-280; northern terminus of SR 420
Ottawa	Harris Township	76.9	123.8	Blue Heron Service Plaza (westbound); Wyandot Service Plaza (eastbound)			
Ottawa	Harris Township	81.48– 82.00	131.13– 131.97	5A	81	SR 51 – Elmore, Woodville, Gibsonburg	Opened February 6, 1997
Sandusky	Sandusky Township	91.46– 91.84	147.19– 147.80	6	91	SR 53 – Fremont, Port Clinton	
Sandusky	Riley Township	100.0	160.9	Erie Islands Service Plaza (westbound); Commodore Perry Service Plaza (eastbound)			
Erie	Groton Township	109.92– 110.58	176.90– 177.96	6A	110	SR 4 – Sandusky, Bellevue	Opened December 15, 1994
Erie	Milan Township	118.23– 118.85	190.27– 191.27	7	118	US 250 – Sandusky, Norwalk	
Lorain	Brownhelm Township	135.62– 136.00	218.26– 218.87	7A	135	To SR 2 / Baumhart Road – Vermilion	Opened December 13, 1995 SR 2 not signed on eastbound side
Lorain	Amherst Township	139.5	224.5	Middle Ridge Service Plaza (westbound); Vermillion Valley Service Plaza (eastbound)			
Lorain	Amherst Township	140.35– 141.01	225.87– 226.93	7B	140	SR 58 – Amherst, Oberlin	Opened November 30, 2004
Lorain	Elyria Township	141.96– 142.59	228.46– 229.48		142	I-80 Toll east / Ohio Turnpike east – Youngstown	Eastbound exit and westbound entrance; east end of I-80 / Turnpike concurrency
Lorain	Elyria Township	143	230	Exit 142 Toll Plaza (eastern end of ticket system)			
Lorain	Elyria Township	144.44	232.45		144	SR 2 west – Sandusky	West end of SR 2 overlap; westbound exit and eastbound entrance; last westbound exit before toll
Lorain	Elyria	145.45– 146.03	234.08– 235.01		145	SR 57 to I-80 / Ohio Turnpike – Elyria, Lorain	
Lorain	Sheffield	147.91– 148.31	238.04– 238.68		148	SR 254 – Sheffield, Avon	
Lorain	Avon	151.13– 151.52	243.22– 243.85		151	SR 611 – Avon, Sheffield	
Lorain	Avon	152.83– 153.17	245.96– 246.50		153	SR 83 – Avon Lake, Avon, North Ridgeville	
Lorain	Avon	154.51– 154.98	248.66– 249.42		155	Nagel Road – Avon Lake, North Ridgeville, Avon	Opened December 20, 2012
Cuyahoga	Westlake	155.44– 156.06	250.16– 251.15		156	Crocker Road, Bassett Road – Bay Village, Westlake, North Olmsted	
Cuyahoga	Westlake	158.10– 158.70	254.44– 255.40		159	SR 252 (Columbia Road)	
Cuyahoga	Westlake	159.34– 159.65	256.43– 256.93		160	Clague Road	Westbound exit and eastbound entrance
Cuyahoga	Rocky River	160.58	258.43		161	SR 2 east / SR 254 (Detroit Road)	East end of SR 2 overlap; eastbound exit and westbound entrance
Cuyahoga	Rocky River	161.84	260.46		162	Hilliard Boulevard – Rocky River	Westbound exit and eastbound entrance
Cuyahoga	Lakewood	162.66– 163.18	261.78– 262.61		164	McKinley Avenue – Lakewood	
Cuyahoga	Cleveland	163.47– 164.21	263.08– 264.27		165A	Warren Road	Signed as exit 165 eastbound
Cuyahoga	Cleveland	164.50	264.74		165B	Bunts Road / West 140th Street	Eastbound exit is via exit 165
Cuyahoga	Cleveland	165.21– 165.67	265.88– 266.62		166	West 117th Street	
Cuyahoga	Cleveland	165.93	267.04		167	To SR 10 (Lorain Avenue) / West Boulevand	Eastbound exit and westbound entrance
Cuyahoga	Cleveland	166.63	268.16		167A	West 98th Street / West Boulevard	Westbound exit and eastbound entrance
Cuyahoga	Cleveland	167.21	269.10		167B	SR 10 (Lorain Avenue)	Westbound exit and eastbound entrance
Cuyahoga	Cleveland	168.06– 168.52	270.47– 271.21		169	West 44th Street / West 41st Street	
Cuyahoga	Cleveland	168.83– 168.96	271.71– 271.91		170A	US 42 (West 25th Street)	Eastbound exit and westbound entrance
Cuyahoga	Cleveland	169.21– 169.28	272.32– 272.43		—	I-490 east to I-77	Eastbound exit and westbound entrance; western terminus of I-490
Cuyahoga	Cleveland	169.35– 169.84	272.54– 273.33		170B	I-71 south / SR 176 south – Columbus, Level 1 Trauma Center	Left exit westbound, left entrance eastbound; SR 176 not signed southbound; northern terminus of I-71
Cuyahoga	Cleveland	170.13	273.80		171	West 14th Street / Abbey Avenue	Westbound exit and eastbound entrance
Cuyahoga	Cleveland	170.61– 170.99	274.57– 275.18		171	US 422 / SR 14 (Ontario Street / Orange Avenue)	Eastbound exit and westbound entrance; unsigned for SR 8, SR 10, SR 43, and SR 87
Cuyahoga	Cleveland	171.11	275.37		172A	East 9th Street	Eastbound exit and westbound entrance
Cuyahoga	Cleveland	171.35– 171.43	275.76– 275.89		172A	I-77 south – Akron	Westbound exit and eastbound entrance; eastbound exit and westbound entrance permanently closed in April 2011; northern terminus of I-77
Cuyahoga	Cleveland	171.41	275.86		172B	East 22nd Street	Closed, now part of I-77 interchange (exit 163B); was eastbound exit only
Cuyahoga	Cleveland	171.62	276.20		172C	Carnegie Avenue	Eastbound exit only
Cuyahoga	Cleveland	171.85– 171.92	276.57– 276.68		173A	Prospect Avenue	No eastbound exit
Cuyahoga	Cleveland	171.96– 172.28	276.74– 277.26		173B	Chester Avenue (US 322)	Unsigned for US 322
Cuyahoga	Cleveland	172.33– 172.67	277.34– 277.89		173C	Superior Avenue (US 6) / St. Clair Avenue	Unsigned for US 6
Cuyahoga	Cleveland	172.87	278.21		174A	Lakeside Avenue	Eastbound exit and westbound entrance
Cuyahoga	Cleveland	172.96– 173.41	278.35– 279.08		174B	SR 2 / LECT west – Lakewood, Downtown Cleveland	Western terminus of concurrency with SR 2; sharp turn 35 mph (56 km/h) advisory in both directions
Cuyahoga	Cleveland	174.33– 174.91	280.56– 281.49		175	East 55th Street / Marginal Roads	
Cuyahoga	Cleveland	175.31– 175.68	282.13– 282.73		176	SR 283 west (East 72nd Street)	Western terminus of concurrency with SR 283
Cuyahoga	Cleveland	175.71– 176.06	282.78– 283.34		177	Martin Luther King Jr. Drive / University Circle	
Cuyahoga	Bratenahl	177.31– 177.75	285.35– 286.06		178	Eddy Road – Bratenahl	
Cuyahoga	Bratenahl	178.52	287.30		179	SR 283 / LECT east (Lake Shore Boulevard)	Eastern terminus of concurrency with SR 283; Eastbound exit and westbound entrance
Cuyahoga	Cleveland	178.75– 179.37	287.67– 288.67		180	East 140th Street / East 152nd Street	Signed as exits 180A (140th Street) and 180B (152nd Street) eastbound
Cuyahoga	Cleveland	179.63– 179.76	289.09– 289.30		181	East 156th Street	No eastbound exit; no trucks permitted
Cuyahoga	Cleveland	180.77– 181.50	290.92– 292.10		182A	East 185th Street	
Cuyahoga	Cleveland	181.19– 182.30	291.60– 293.38		182B	East 200th Street	
Cuyahoga	Euclid	181.69– 182.96	292.40– 294.45		183	East 222nd Street	
Cuyahoga	Euclid	183.35– 183.71	295.07– 295.65		184	SR 175 (East 260th Street) / Babbitt Road	Signed as exits 184A (Babbitt Rd.) and 184B (E. 260th) eastbound
Cuyahoga	Euclid	184.11– 184.55	296.30– 297.00		185	SR 2 east – Painesville	Eastern terminus of concurrency with SR 2
Cuyahoga–Lake county line	Euclid–Wickliffe line	184.84– 185.36	297.47– 298.31		186	US 20 (Euclid Avenue)	
Lake	Wickliffe	185.63– 185.98	298.74– 299.31		187	SR 84 (Bishop Road) – Wickliffe, Willoughby Hills, Richmond Heights	
Lake	Willoughby Hills	187.18– 187.77	301.24– 302.19		188	I-271 south – Akron, Columbus, East Suburbs	Left exit westbound; northern terminus of I-271; exit 40 on I-271
Lake	Willoughby Hills	188.22– 188.67	302.91– 303.63		189	SR 91 – Willoughby Hills, Willoughby	
Lake	Willoughby Hills	188.97	304.12		190	I-271 south (Express Lanes) – Akron, Columbus	To I-271 Express Lanes only; westbound exit and eastbound entrance
Lake	Willoughby	192.45– 192.91	309.72– 310.46		193	SR 306 – Mentor, Kirtland	
Lake	Mentor	194.25– 194.72	312.62– 313.37		195	SR 615 (Center Street) – Kirtland Hills, Mentor	Interchange opened November 24, 2003
Lake	Concord Township	199.50– 199.86	321.06– 321.64		200	SR 44 – Chardon, Painesville	
Lake	Leroy Township	204.06– 204.37	328.40– 328.90		205	Vrooman Road	
Lake	Madison	211.71– 212.01	340.71– 341.20		212	SR 528 – Madison, Thompson	
Ashtabula	Harpersfield Township	217.05– 217.30	349.31– 349.71		218	SR 534 – Geneva	
Ashtabula	Austinburg Township	222.05– 222.39	357.35– 357.90		223	SR 45 – Ashtabula, Warren	Austinburg; Rock Creek; Jefferson via SR 307
Ashtabula	Plymouth Township	227.55– 228.06	366.21– 367.03		228	SR 11 to SR 46 – Youngstown, Ashtabula	Jefferson via SR 46
Ashtabula	Kingsville Township	234.14– 234.51	376.81– 377.41		235	SR 84 / SR 193 – North Kingsville	Youngstown
Ashtabula	Conneaut	239.81– 240.20	385.94– 386.56		241	SR 7 – Andover, Conneaut	Youngstown
Ashtabula	Conneaut	242.91	390.93			I-90 east – Erie	Continuation into Pennsylvania
1.000 mi = 1.609 km; 1.000 km = 0.621 mi: Closed/former; Concurrency terminus; Incomplete access; Tolled

== Auxiliary routes ==
Interstate 490 is a spur route in Cleveland that connects I-90 and I-71 to I-77 and the Opportunity Corridor, functioning as an inner bypass of downtown.

== Notes ==
Interstate 90
Previous state: Indiana	Ohio	Next state: Pennsylvania
