= Ohio State Route 10 =

State highway in Ohio, US

State Route 10
- SR 10 in red, SR 10C in blue

Route information
- Maintained by ODOT
- Length: 23.73 mi (38.19 km)
- Existed: 1934–present

Major junctions
- West end: US 20 / SR 57 / SR 301 near Elyria
- I-480 in North Ridgeville; I-90 in Cleveland; US 42 / SR 3 in Cleveland; US 422 / SR 8 / SR 14 / SR 43 / SR 87 in Cleveland; I-77 in Cleveland; I-490 in Cleveland; US 20 in Cleveland
- East end: US 322 in Cleveland

Location
- Country: United States
- State: Ohio
- Counties: Lorain, Cuyahoga

Highway system
- Ohio State Highway System; Interstate; US; State; Scenic
← SR 9	→ SR 11

State Route 10 (SR 10) is a state highway located in and around Cleveland, Ohio. The route's western terminus is in Eaton Township in Lorain County, and the eastern terminus is in Cleveland's University Circle neighborhood.

== Description ==
After leaving the junction of U.S. Route 20, State Route 57 and State Route 301, where US 20 and SR 301 continue westbound on the freeway, SR 10 reaches North Ridgeville, where it merges with Interstate 480 at the interstate's western terminus in North Ridgeville, and continues with the interstate briefly eastward. Just east of this junction, the route also has an interchange with Interstate 80 and the Ohio Turnpike via a connecting or spur road. SR 10 then becomes a grade-level road in North Ridgeville before heading into Cuyahoga County, and is known as Lorain Road. It then continues through the western suburbs of Cleveland and through the western part of Cleveland, as Lorain Avenue, crossing the Cuyahoga River on the Hope Memorial Bridge at Gateway at Broadway Avenue/Ontario Street (U.S. Route 422, State Route 8, State Route 14, State Route 43, and State Route 87). It then follows those routes to Interstate 77, which it follows to the Opportunity Corridor, then it runs along that to its east terminus at U.S. Route 322 in University Circle.

== History ==
=== Former alignments ===
As part of the "Inter-County Highway" system, Inter-County Highway (later State Route) 10 ran along present-day US 22 from Cincinnati to Zanesville. As part of a 1923 highway renumbering, the route was removed and was replaced by two routes: SR 3 (part) and SR 40. Also part of this renumbering, SR 10 was established along current-day SR 309 and US 30 corridors. Up until then, this corridor was signed as State Routes 127, 128, 112, 114, 206 (part), 202, and 146. In 1926, all of SR 10 in the second alignment was cosigned with US 30.

With the introduction of the U.S. Numbered Highway System in Ohio, creating duplicate numbers and redundant concurrencies, a 1927 renumbering plan was implemented. As part of this plan, SR 10 was removed from US 30 (now SR 309 and US 30) and was moved to the eastern section of its first alignment. The "third" alignment traveled from Washington Court House to Zanesville. In 1932, without any significant changes, SR 10 was removed in favor of US 22's southwest extension from Cambridge. The route then moved onto an Aberdeen–Toledo alignment for one year. After that, in 1933, the route became part of US 68's northern extension into Ohio.

=== Current alignment ===
In 1934, one year after SR 10 was not present, the route reappeared largely on its current alignment, running from Oberlin to downtown Cleveland. In 1983, a section of SR 10 from SR 301 to I-80/I-480 became freeway-standard. In 1988, SR 10 was truncated to its current western terminus after US 20 moved onto a freeway that was recently upgraded. The remaining route through Oberlin became part of SR 511. In 2021, SR 10 was extended eastward to US 322 (Chester Avenue) in the University Circle neighborhood. At its previous eastern terminus at Ontario Avenue, SR 10 turns east and follows Ontario and Orange Avenues (US 422, SR 8, SR 14, SR 43, SR 87) east, turns southeast along a small part of I-77 (Willow Freeway), then exits at the interchange with I-490 (Troy Lee James Highway) heading east along the Opportunity Corridor and north along 105th Street.

== Major intersections ==
County	Location	mi	km	Exit	Destinations	Notes
Lorain	Eaton Township	0.00	0.00	–	US 20 west / SR 301 south / Grafton Road – Norwalk	Continuation beyond western terminus
Lorain	Eaton Township	0.00	0.00	–	SR 57 / US 20 east / SR 301 north – Medina, Elyria	
Lorain	North Ridgeville	2.39– 2.68	3.85– 4.31	–	SR 83 – North Ridgeville, Wooster	Access via SR 83C; former exit 3
Lorain	North Ridgeville	5.18– 5.49	8.34– 8.84	1	I-480 west to I-80 / Ohio Turnpike – Toledo	Western terminus of concurrency with I-480; westbound exit and eastbound entrance
Lorain	North Ridgeville	6.25– 6.71	10.06– 10.80	2	I-480 east – Cleveland	Eastern end of I-480 concurrency
Lorain	North Ridgeville	6.25– 6.71	10.06– 10.80	Eastern terminus of limited-access highway		
Lorain	North Ridgeville				Lorain Road west (SR 10C) to I-80 / Ohio Turnpike – North Ridgeville	Eastern terminus of SR 10C
Cuyahoga	North Olmsted	10.31	16.59		SR 17 east (Brookpark Road)	Western terminus of SR 17
Cuyahoga	North Olmsted	11.08	17.83		SR 252 south (Great Northern Boulevard)	Western terminus of concurrency with SR 252
Cuyahoga	North Olmsted	11.49	18.49		SR 252 north (Columbia Road)	Eastern terminus of concurrency with SR 252
Cuyahoga	Cleveland	16.09	25.89		SR 237 (Rocky River Drive)	
Cuyahoga	Cleveland	20.33	32.72		I-90 / Clark Avenue – Toledo	Access via frontage roads; exit 167B on I-90
Cuyahoga	Cleveland	22.47	36.16		US 42 / SR 3 (West 25th Street)	
Cuyahoga	Cleveland	23.64	38.04		US 422 west / SR 8 north / SR 14 west / SR 43 west / SR 87 west (Ontario Street) / I-90 west / I-71 south to I-77	Western terminus of US 422 / SR 8 / SR 14 / SR 43 / SR 87 concurrency
Cuyahoga	Cleveland				SR 14 east / SR 43 east (East 14th Street)	Eastern terminus of SR 14 / SR 43 concurrency
Cuyahoga	Cleveland			Western terminus of limited-access highway		
Cuyahoga	Cleveland			162A	I-77 north / US 422 east / SR 8 south / SR 87 east	Eastern terminus of US 422 / SR 8 / SR 87 concurrency and western terminus of I-77 concurrency
Cuyahoga	Cleveland			161B	I-77 south / I-490 west	Eastern terminus of I-77 concurrency and western terminus of I-490 concurrency
Cuyahoga	Cleveland				I-490 ends / 55th Street	Eastern terminus of I-490
Cuyahoga	Cleveland			Eastern terminus of limited-access highway		
Cuyahoga	Cleveland				US 422 / SR 8 (Kinsman Road)	
Cuyahoga	Cleveland				SR 87 (Buckeye Road)	
Cuyahoga	Cleveland				US 20 (Euclid Avenue)	
Cuyahoga	Cleveland				US 322 (Chester Avenue)	Eastern terminus
1.000 mi = 1.609 km; 1.000 km = 0.621 mi: Concurrency terminus; Incomplete access

== Route 10C ==
State Route 10C is a 0.77-mile-long (1.24 km) unsigned portion of Lorain Road in North Ridgeville, Ohio between the Ohio Turnpike and I-480. It runs along a portion of former SR 10.
