= Ohio State Route 8 =

State highway in Ohio, US

State Route 8

Route information
- Maintained by ODOT
- Length: 38.34 mi (61.70 km)
- Existed: 1924–present

Major junctions
- South end: I-76 / I-77 in Akron
- I-80 / Ohio Turnpike in Boston Heights; I-271 in Macedonia; US 422 in Shaker Heights; I-77 in Cleveland
- North end: US 6 / US 20 / US 422 / SR 14 / SR 43 / SR 87 at Public Square in Cleveland

Location
- Country: United States
- State: Ohio
- Counties: Summit, Cuyahoga

Highway system
- Ohio State Highway System; Interstate; US; State; Scenic
← SR 7	→ SR 9

State Route 8 (SR 8) is a road in the U.S. state of Ohio. SR 8 stretches from the eastern junction of Interstate 76 (I-76) and I-77 in Akron to Public Square in Cleveland. It is one of nine routes to enter downtown Cleveland at Public Square. The route's first few miles are as a limited-access freeway from I-76 and I-77, heading north. The freeway section of the highway has 17 interchanges, and is cosigned with SR 59 for approximately five miles (8.0 km) from Perkins Street in Akron to Front Street in Cuyahoga Falls. The freeway section ends at I-271 in Macedonia.

== Route description ==
SR 8 begins at an interchange with I-76 and I-77 southeast of downtown Akron. The Akron Expressway, as the freeway is known within the city limits, heads up the east side of Akron. SR 8's first interchange is the main access to the central business district and the University of Akron. Just before leaving central Akron, an interchange with Perkins Street begins a concurrency with SR 59. The road continues over the North Expressway Viaduct, which crosses over several railroads and the Little Cuyahoga River, before continuing to the north side of Akron. Between exits 3B and 4, SR 8/59 cross into Cuyahoga Falls. Those two exits connect with the same stretch of road but have different names and are on different sides of the city limit.

The freeway continues north through Cuyahoga Falls, parallel to the Cuyahoga River; the freeway crosses the river just before exit 6. SR 59 leaves the freeway at exit 6 to head east toward Kent. SR 8, which until now has been heading slightly northeast, turns north and northwest after exit 6, interchanging with Graham Road in the process. The road continues through a relatively rural area on the eastern edge of Cuyahoga Valley National Park. Exits 10, 12, 14A-B and 15 are normally only used as a connection to Hudson or Blossom Music Center and other points in the national park, as their immediate areas are sparsely populated and underdeveloped. Once it passes the Ohio Turnpike, SR 8 continues through a wooded area. The route's last exit is with I-271, after which it enters Cleveland's southeastern suburbs.

Now known as Northfield Road, SR 8 continues parallel to I-271, intersecting SR 82, SR 14, and SR 17. Following its intersection with SR 17, SR 8 enters a brief concurrency with SR 43, during which it intersects I-480. SR 43 splits off, and SR 8 continues northward before joining US 422 and turning to the west. The new road is briefly known as Chagrin Boulevard before becoming Kinsman Road. SR 8/US 422 continues to the northwest through the immediate Cleveland area; during its approach to downtown Cleveland, SR 87 joins the concurrency, followed by an interchange with I-77.

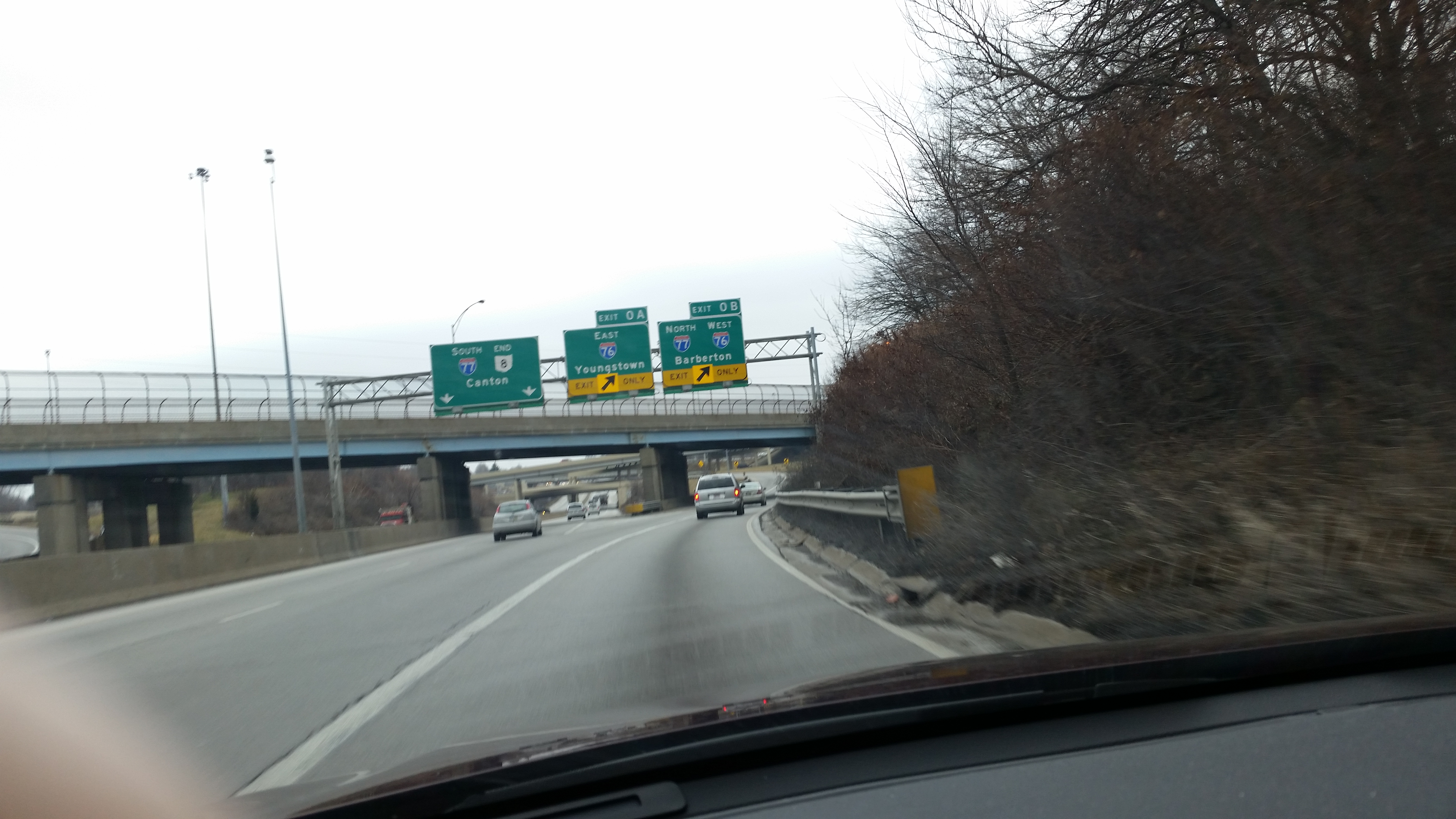
Southern terminus of SR 8 in 2016

For its final mile, SR 8/SR 87/US 422 picks up a concurrency of SR 14/SR 43, after which the road becomes known as Ontario Street and turns toward Public Square, the northern terminus of SR 8. SR 8's northern terminus is shared with six other roads: SR 3, SR 14, SR 43, SR 87, US 42, and US 422.

== History ==
SR 8 was one of the original state highways in Ohio. It went from Marietta all the way to Cleveland. Over time, though, parts of the route were renumbered or reassigned, especially south of Akron. In 1926 the portion from Marietta to Newcomerstown became U.S. Route 21. The same year the section from Newcomerstown to Uhrichsville became State Route 16 and SR 8 was rerouted from the Ohio River town of Fly to Uhrichsville. In 1969, the section from Fly to Canton was renumbered to State Route 800, the portion from Canton to Akron was deleted, and the southern end of the highway was truncated at Akron, at U.S. Route 224.

The SR 8B freeway, as it appeared on the 1964 Ohio highway map.

On August 6, 1954, the portion of the North Expressway in Akron opened from Perkins Street to Cuyahoga Falls Avenue. By 1962, it had been extended south to the Central Interchange and numbered Route 8B; it became mainline SR 8 in 1969 north of Market Street, and in its entirety by 1971. A section of freeway between Front Street (SR 59) and Graham Road in Cuyahoga Falls and Stow opened by 1972, with the connecting section opening in 1974. The freeway carried only the SR 59 designation between Tallmadge Avenue in Akron and Front Street in Cuyahoga Falls and had no posted number north of there until 1983, when the SR 8 designation was transferred to the freeway. The final section of freeway opened on May 20, 1988, reaching State Route 303.

SR 8 from Interstate 77 to Perkins Street was rebuilt from 2003 to 2005. The freeway in that stretch previously had onramps and offramps built closely together, creating the danger of weaving traffic. Several ramps were removed and service roads were built on both sides of the freeway.

Route 8 from SR 303 north to Interstate 271 was converted to a full freeway without at-grade intersections between 2008 and 2011. The ramp between State Route 8 northbound and I-271 northbound opened July 24, 2009, and the opposite ramp opened on September 4. The new Turnpike interchange opened in December 2010, well ahead of the projected date of fall 2011.

An interchange was opened at Seasons Road in 2010 to serve the area near the borders of Cuyahoga Falls, Stow, and Hudson. Although the interchange was completed on January 25, 2010, it was not initially scheduled to open until one month later, on February 26, when an official ribbon-cutting could take place. Two weeks before the scheduled opening, an editorial in the Akron Beacon Journal lambasted the ribbon-cutting, calling the ceremony a mere "photo op", and questioning why a finished project should sit unused for 31 days. On February 21, the government of Stow, which had been responsible for holding the ceremony, announced the interchange would open in the morning of the next day without a ribbon-cutting.

In 2015 SR 8 was rerouted slightly in Shaker Heights due to a six-leg intersection being converted to a four-leg one.

A complete replacement of the North Expressway Viaduct began in 2023 and is expected to be finished in 2028.

=== Central Interchange rebuild, Akron ===
Between 2021 and 2025, the Central Interchange in Akron, where SR 8, I-76, and I-77 converge, was completely reconstructed, including the relocation of the east-to-north and west-to-south ramps. The project also added a southbound lane to SR 8 approaching the interchange.

=== Interstate proposal ===
In January 2014, the Akron Metropolitan Area Transportation Study (AMATS) metropolitan planning organization proposed to designate the section between the central interchange in Akron (at I-76/77) to Macedonia (at I-271) as Interstate 380. ODOT declined the proposal for financial reasons. The letter was resubmitted in April 2014 with support from additional local officials, including Akron mayor Don Plusquellic, however ODOT would decline the proposal again.

== Major intersections ==
County	Location	mi	km	Exit	Destinations	Notes
Summit	Akron	0.00– 0.41	0.00– 0.66	–	I-77 south – Canton	Signed as exit 23B on I-76 and 125A on I-77
Summit	Akron	0.00– 0.41	0.00– 0.66	1A	I-76 east – Youngstown	Signed as exit 125B on I-77 northbound
Summit	Akron	0.00– 0.41	0.00– 0.66	1B	I-76 west / I-77 north – Barberton, Cleveland	
Summit	Akron	0.99– 1.42	1.59– 2.29	1C	To SR 18 (Market Street) / Buchtel Avenue / Carroll Avenue / Exchange Street	
Summit	Akron	1.63– 1.85	2.62– 2.98	1D	SR 59 west (Perkins Street)	Southern terminus of SR 59 concurrency
Summit	Akron	2.67	4.30	2	Glenwood Avenue	Northbound exit and southbound entrance
Summit	Akron	2.91– 3.20	4.68– 5.15	3A	SR 261 (Tallmadge Avenue)	Signed as exit 3 southbound
Summit	Akron	3.79	6.10	3B	Cuyahoga Falls Avenue	Northbound exit and southbound entrance
Summit	Cuyahoga Falls	4.27– 4.58	6.87– 7.37	4	Howe Avenue	Also signed for Cuyahoga Falls Avenue southbound
Summit	Cuyahoga Falls	5.24– 5.73	8.43– 9.22	5A	Broad Boulevard	Signed as exit 5 southbound
Summit	Cuyahoga Falls	5.48	8.82	5B	Portage Trail	Northbound exit and southbound entrance
Summit	Cuyahoga Falls	6.11– 6.73	9.83– 10.83	6	SR 59 east (Front Street) / Second Street – Kent	Southbound exit to Second Street; northern terminus of SR 59 concurrency
Summit	Stow	7.54– 7.90	12.13– 12.71	7	Graham Road – Stow, Silver Lake	
Summit	Stow	8.91– 9.30	14.34– 14.97	9	Steels Corners Road	
Summit	Stow	10.39– 10.89	16.72– 17.53	10	Seasons Road	Opened February 22, 2010
Summit	Boston Heights	12.56– 13.16	20.21– 21.18	12	SR 303 (West Streetsboro Road) – Hudson, Peninsula	
Summit	Boston Heights	14.05– 15.21	22.61– 24.48	14A	Boston Mills Road / Hines Hill Road	Interchange reconstructed in December 2010, signed as exit 15 southbound
Summit	Boston Heights	14.05– 14.73	22.61– 23.71	14B	I-80 / Ohio Turnpike – Toledo, Youngstown	Interchange reconstructed in December 2010; exit 180 on I-80 / Turnpike
Summit	Macedonia	16.42– 18.06	26.43– 29.06	17	I-271 – Erie, PA, Columbus	Exits 18A-B on I-271
Summit	Macedonia	17.57	28.28	Northern end of freeway section		
Summit	Macedonia	18.68	30.06		SR 82 (East Aurora Road)	
Cuyahoga	Bedford	23.64	38.04		SR 14 (Broadway Avenue)	
Cuyahoga	Bedford Heights	25.94	41.75		SR 17 (Libby Road)	
Cuyahoga	Bedford Heights	26.32– 26.39	42.36– 42.47		SR 43 south (Aurora Road / Mueti Drive) to I-480 east / I-271 south – Youngstown, Columbus	Southern terminus of SR 43 concurrency
Cuyahoga	Bedford Heights	26.32– 26.39	42.36– 42.47		I-480 west – Cleveland, Toledo	
Cuyahoga	North Randall	26.66	42.91		SR 43 west (Miles Road)	Northern terminus of SR 43 concurrency
Cuyahoga	Shaker Heights	29.55	47.56		US 422 east (Chagrin Boulevard) / Warrensville Center Road	Southern terminus of US 422 concurrency
Cuyahoga	Cleveland				SR 10 (Opportunity Corridor)	
Cuyahoga	Cleveland	35.97	57.89		SR 87 east (Woodland Avenue) / East 55th Street	Southern terminus of SR 87 concurrency
Cuyahoga	Cleveland	36.75– 36.86	59.14– 59.32		I-77 south / SR 10 to I-71 – Akron	Eastern terminus of SR 10 concurrency; southbound exit and northbound entrance; exit 162A on I-77
Cuyahoga	Cleveland	36.89	59.37		To East 30th Street / SR 14 (Broadway Avenue) / SR 43	
Cuyahoga	Cleveland	36.95	59.47		I-77 north to I-90	Northbound exit and southbound entrance; exit 162A on I-77
Cuyahoga	Cleveland	37.40	60.19		SR 14 / SR 43 (Broadway Avenue)	Southern terminus of concurrency SR 14 / SR 43 concurrency
Cuyahoga	Cleveland	37.81	60.85		SR 10 west (Lorain Avenue) / I-77 south / I-90 west to I-71 – Akron, Airport	Eastern terminus of SR 10; exit 162B on I-77; exits 171A-B on I-90
Cuyahoga	Cleveland	38.34	61.70		US 6 / US 20 (Euclid Avenue) / US 42 south / US 322 east / SR 3 south (Superior Avenue) / US 422 east	Public Square; termini of US 42, US 322, US 422, SR 3, SR 14, SR 43, SR 87
1.000 mi = 1.609 km; 1.000 km = 0.621 mi: Concurrency terminus; Incomplete access; Tolled
