= Amherst Township, Ohio =

Township in Ohio, US

Amherst Township, Lorain County, Ohio
- Township
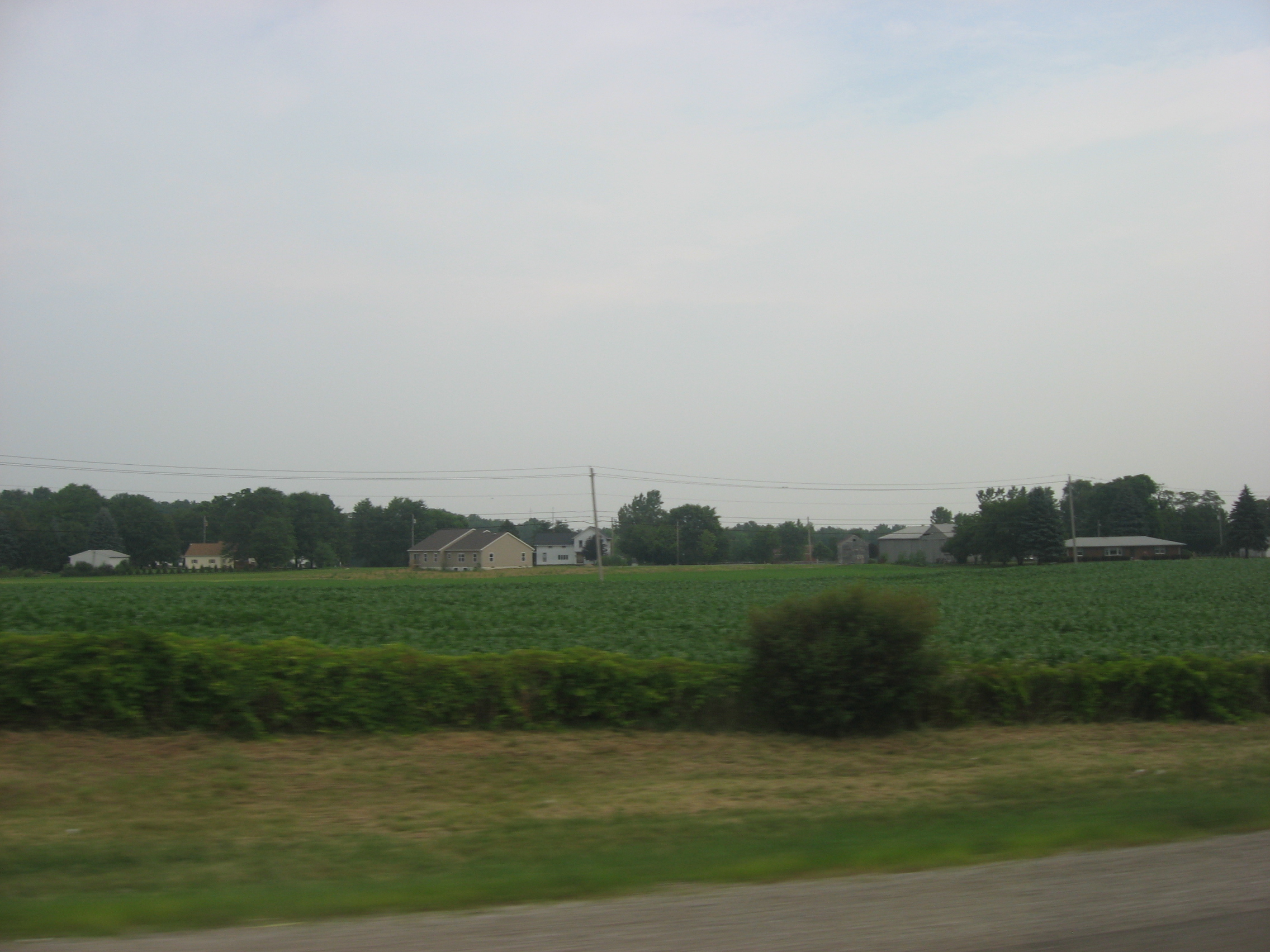
- Houses and fields in western Amherst Township

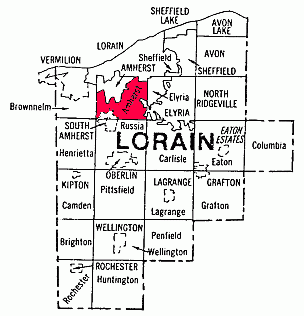
- Location in Lorain County, Ohio
- Coordinates: 41°22′52″N 82°12′48″W
- Country: United States
- State: Ohio
- County: Lorain

Area
  - Total: 15.5 sq mi (40.1 km^{2})
  - Land: 15.4 sq mi (39.9 km^{2})
  - Water: 0.077 sq mi (0.2 km^{2})
- Elevation: 738 ft (225 m)

Population (2020)
  - Total: 6,492
  - Density: 421/sq mi (163/km^{2})
- Time zone: UTC-5 (Eastern (EST))
  - Summer (DST): UTC-4 (EDT)
- ZIP code: 44001
- Area code: 440
- FIPS code: 39-01812
- GNIS feature ID: 1086499
- Website: amhersttownship.us

Amherst Township is one of the eighteen townships of Lorain County, Ohio, United States. As of the 2020 census, the population was 6,492.

== Geography ==
Located in northern Lorain County, it borders the following townships and cities:

- Amherst - northwest
- Lorain - northeast
- Elyria Township - east
- Elyria - southeast
- Carlisle Township - southeast corner
- New Russia Township - south
- Henrietta Township - southwest corner
- Brownhelm Township - west

The city of Amherst occupies what was northwestern Amherst Township, and part of the village of South Amherst lies in the southwestern part of the township.

== Name and history ==
It is the only township named "Amherst" statewide.

Amherst Township was established as a judicially-independent township in 1830, and named after Amherst, New Hampshire. It had been originally created as "Town(ship) number 6 in the 18th Range" (of the Connecticut Western Reserve); but prior to 1830, it was judicially attached to "Black River township". Its first pioneer-settlement began in 1812, when Jacob Shupe built a gristmill on his farm in its northern section. And although many additional pioneers settled throughout the other portions of the township in the 1810s and 1820s, but the actual village of Amherst was not officially established until 1836. By the mid-20th-century, that village eventually encompassed most of the northern half of the original township.

== Government ==
The township is governed by a three-member board of trustees, who are elected in November of odd-numbered years to a four-year term beginning on the following January 1. Two are elected in the year after the presidential election and one is elected in the year before it. There is also an elected township fiscal officer, who serves a four-year term beginning on April 1 of the year after the election, which is held in November of the year before the presidential election. Vacancies in the fiscal officership or on the board of trustees are filled by the remaining trustees. The current trustees are Dennis Abraham, Neil Lynch, and David Urig.
