= Elyria Township, Ohio =

Township in Ohio, US

Elyria Township, Lorain County, Ohio
- Township
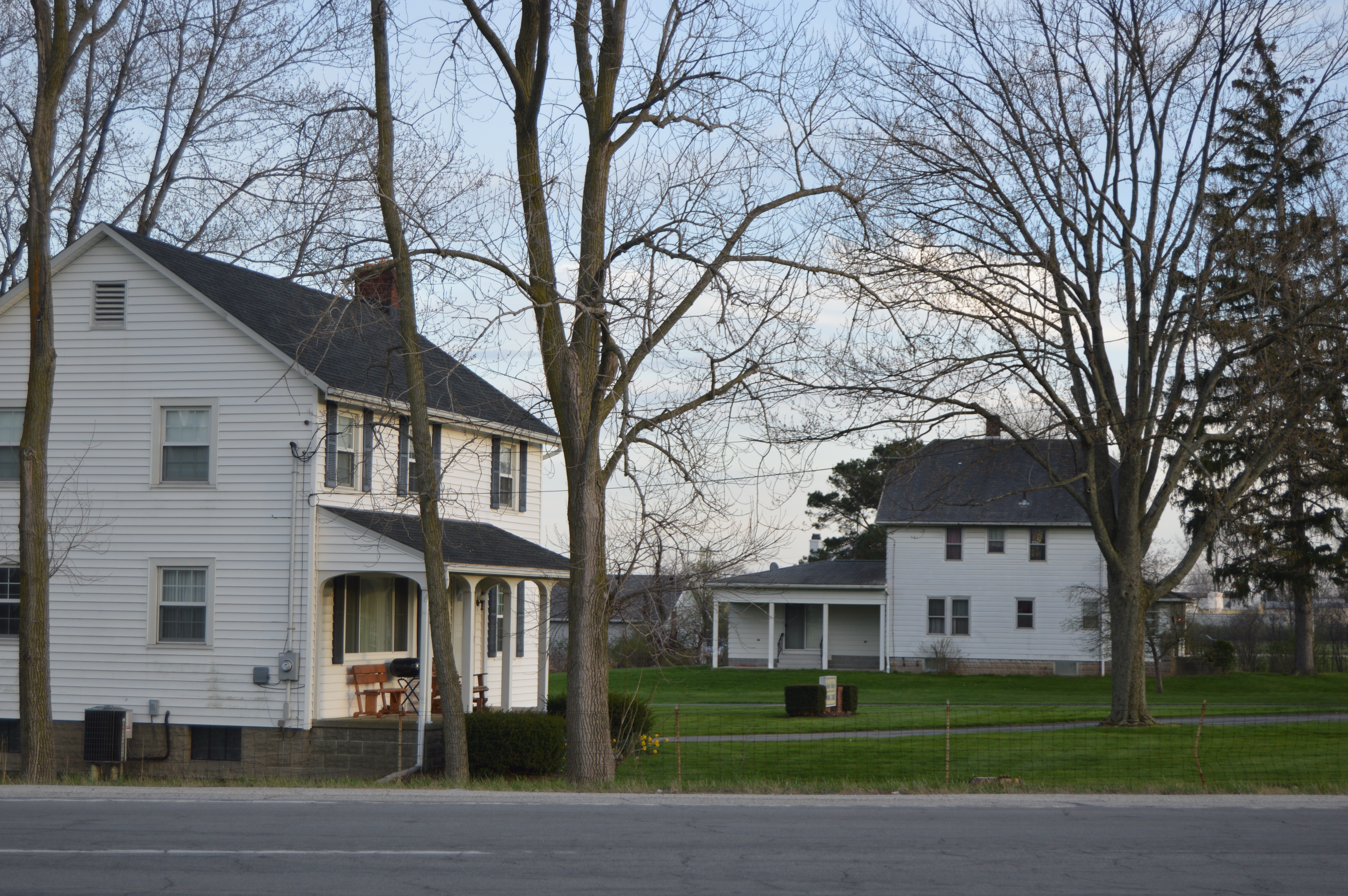
- Houses on Murray Ridge Road

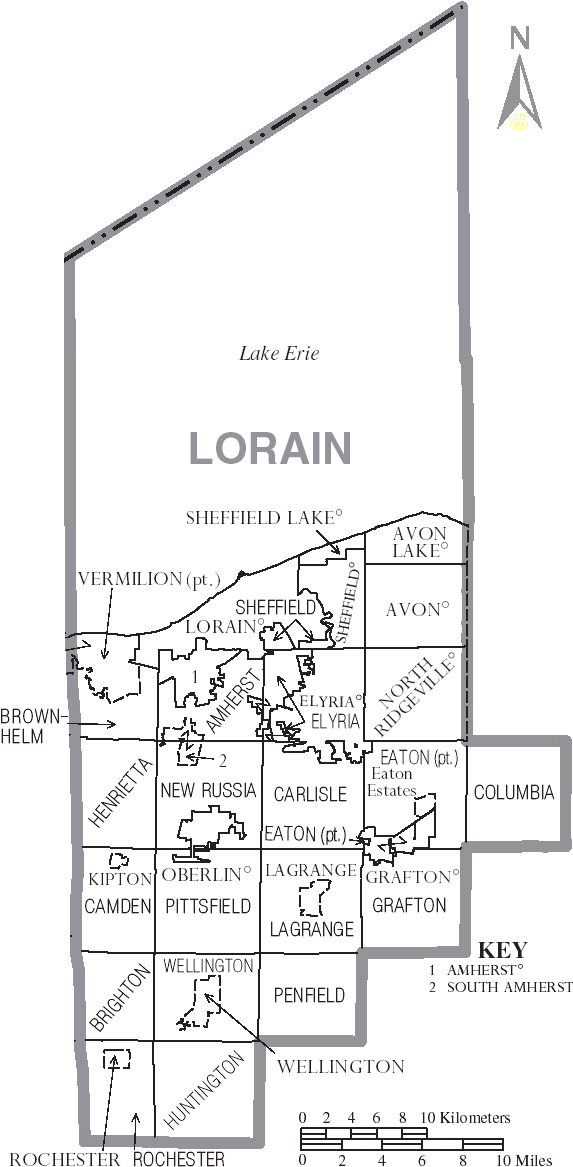
- Municipalities of Lorain County, Ohio
- Coordinates: 41°23′45″N 82°8′25″W
- Country: United States
- State: Ohio
- County: Lorain

Area
  - Total: 5.61 sq mi (14.52 km^{2})
  - Land: 5.60 sq mi (14.50 km^{2})
  - Water: 0.0077 sq mi (0.02 km^{2})
- Elevation: 741 ft (226 m)

Population (2020)
  - Total: 3,250
  - Density: 581/sq mi (224/km^{2})
- Time zone: UTC-5 (Eastern (EST))
  - Summer (DST): UTC-4 (EDT)
- ZIP codes: 44000-44099
- Area code: 440
- FIPS code: 39-25270
- GNIS feature ID: 1086509
- Website: elyriatownship.com

Elyria Township is one of the eighteen townships of Lorain County, Ohio, United States. As of the 2020 census the population was 3,250.

== Geography ==
Located in northern Lorain County, it borders the following townships and cities:

- Lorain - northwest and north
- Sheffield Township - north
- Elyria - east
- Carlisle Township - south
- New Russia Township - southwest corner
- Amherst Township - west

No municipalities are located in Elyria Township, other than the city of Elyria, which has annexed the majority of the township.

== Name and history ==
It is the only Elyria Township statewide. Elyria Township is named for Heman Ely, an early settler.

== Government ==
The township is governed by a three-member board of trustees, who are elected in November of odd-numbered years to a four-year term beginning on the following January 1. Two are elected in the year after the presidential election and one is elected in the year before it. There is also an elected township fiscal officer, who serves a four-year term beginning on April 1 of the year after the election, which is held in November of the year before the presidential election. Vacancies in the fiscal officership or on the board of trustees are filled by the remaining trustees.
