= Interstate 271 =

Highway in Ohio

Interstate 271
- Outerbelt East Freeway

Route information
- Auxiliary route of I-71
- Maintained by ODOT
- Length: 40.22 mi (64.73 km)
- Existed: 1964–present
- NHS: Entire route

Major junctions
- South end: I-71 in Medina Township
- I-77 / SR 21 in Richfield; I-480 / SR 14 in Oakwood; I-480 / US 422 in Bedford Heights
- North end: I-90 in Willoughby Hills

Location
- Country: United States
- State: Ohio
- Counties: Medina, Summit, Cuyahoga, Lake

Highway system
- Interstate Highway System; Main; Auxiliary; Suffixed; Business; Future; Ohio State Highway System; Interstate; US; State; Scenic
← SR 270	→ SR 271

Interstate 271 (I-271) is an auxiliary Interstate Highway in the suburbs of Cleveland and Akron in the US state of Ohio. The highway is officially designated the Outerbelt East Freeway but is rarely referred to by that name by locals, instead simply referring to it as "271".

== Route description ==
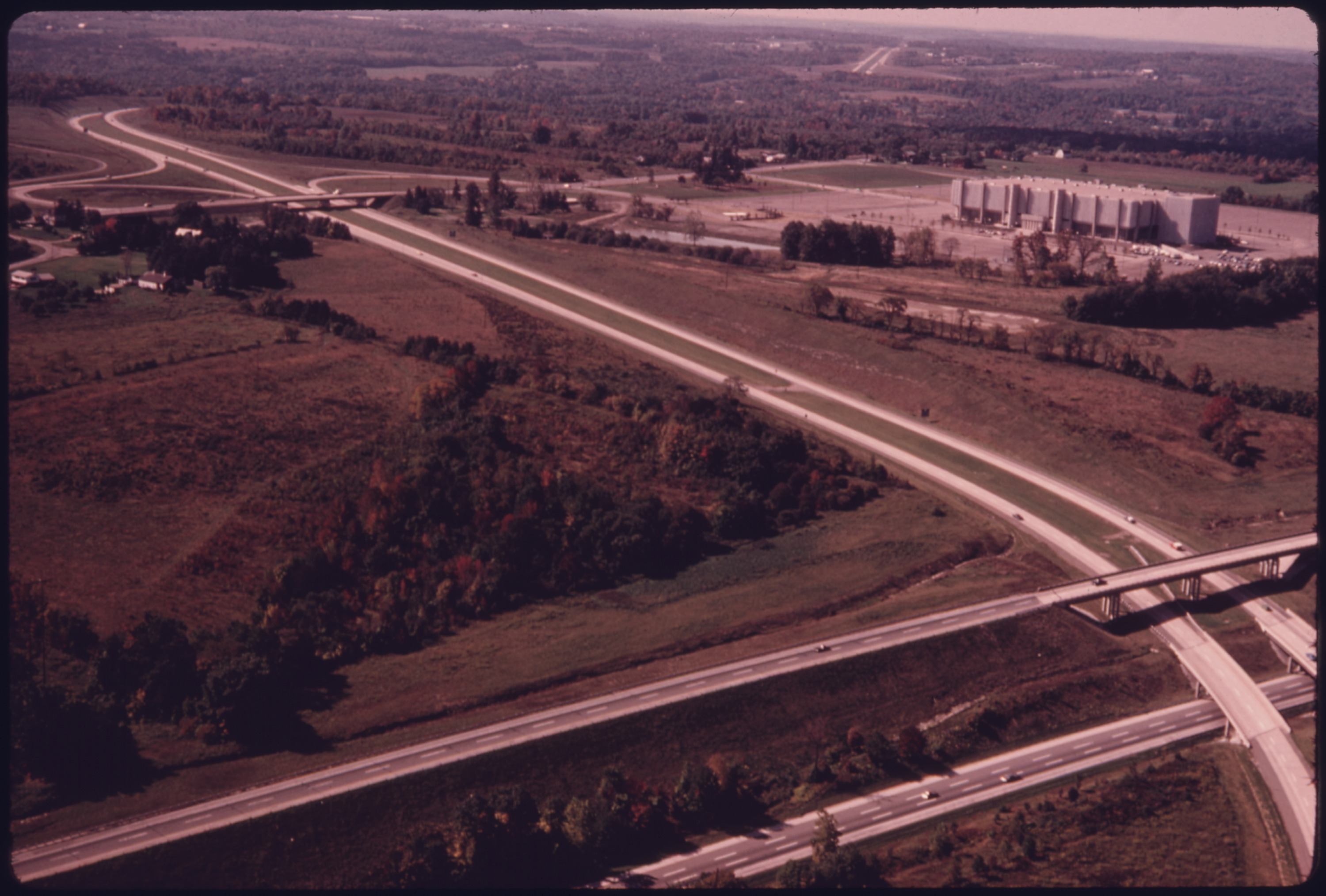
Aerial view of I-271, exit 12, its crossing of the Ohio Turnpike, and the now-defunct Richfield Coliseum in 1975

I-271 begins at an interchange with I-71 in Medina Township to I-90 in Willoughby Hills, with an interchange with I-480 (and traveling concurrently with it for a short stretch). The width varies from point to point but is mostly four to six lanes wide south of I-480 and eight to twelve lanes wide north of I-480; there, it is divided into local–express lanes.

The local–express lanes begin at the southern interchange of U.S. Route 422 (US 422) and continue northward slightly beyond the end of I-271. The northbound express lanes allow access to all exits (excluding Chagrin Boulevard, Harvard Road, and State Route 175 (SR 175), a southbound-only exit). The southbound express lanes bypass all exits except for one combined exit for Chagrin Boulevard (west US 422), Harvard Road, Richmond Road (SR 175), and US 422 (east) interchange. The lanes then become the mainline of I-480N which in turn becomes I-480 westbound.

I-271 does not have a direct interchange with I-80/Ohio Turnpike—one of only a few examples of Interstate Highways that cross but do not intersect. The I-271/I-480 section was the only instance of a concurrency of two three-digit Interstate Highways in the nation until 2022, when a concurrency between I-587 and I-795, and I-840 and I-785 in North Carolina was established with the designation of I-587, I-785, and I-840. This is because I-80 was concurrent with I-271 until 1971, when I-80 was routed back on to the turnpike and replaced by I-480.

== History ==
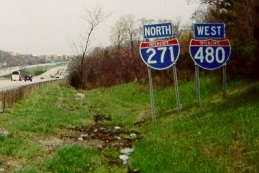
I-271/I-480 north of the Broadway/Forbes interchange in 2002

I-290 was to have followed the northern end of I-271. I-271 itself was to have followed I-480 and I-480N westward to I-71.

I-271's express lanes were added between 1993 and 1995, with related projects continuing through 1998.

The I-271/SR 8 interchange underwent reconstruction in 2008–2009 that turned it into a complete interchange allowing all movements, with free flow between I-271 to the north and SR 8 to the south.

=== I-271 rebuilding and widening program ===
The need for the I-271 widening project between Miles Road and the Summit County line was identified in March 2002. I-271 will be widened from two to three lanes north and southbound between Miles Road and Columbus Road and from three to five lanes north and southbound between Columbus Road and the I-271/I-480 split near the Summit County line. Construction will last two years and includes replacement of the existing pavement, noise walls, lighting, and signing. A similar project to widen I-271 from two to three lanes will be constructed in Summit County between the Cuyahoga County line and SR 8 and will improve access to the Ohio Turnpike. That project is scheduled to begin in 2014 and be complete in 2016.

== Exit list ==
County	Location	mi	km	Exit	Destinations	Notes
Medina	Medina Township	0.00	0.00	1	I-71 south – Columbus	No access to I-71 north or from I-71 south; exit 220 on I-71
Medina	Medina Township	3.29– 3.69	5.29– 5.94	3	SR 94 (Ridge Road) to I-71 north – Wadsworth, North Royalton, Cleveland	
Summit	Richfield	7.46– 7.88	12.01– 12.68	Rest Area		
Summit	Richfield	9.38	15.10	9	Brecksville Road to SR 176 / I-77 south	Northbound exit and southbound entrance
Summit	Richfield Township	9.90– 10.36	15.93– 16.67	10	I-77 to I-80 / Ohio Turnpike – Cleveland, Akron	Same-directional movements only
Summit	Richfield Township	12.38– 12.57	19.92– 20.23	12	SR 303 (Streetsboro Road) – Richfield, Peninsula	
Summit	Macedonia	18.13– 18.64	29.18– 30.00	18	SR 8 to SR 82 – Macedonia, Northfield, Boston Heights, Akron	Signed as exit 18A (south) and exit 18B (north) southbound; no southbound signage for SR 82
Summit	Macedonia	19.44	31.29	19	SR 82 (East Aurora Road) – Macedonia, Twinsburg	Northbound exit is via exit 18
Cuyahoga	Oakwood			21 & 23	I-480 west / SR 14 (Broadway Avenue) / Forbes Road	Northbound exit; southbound entrance is exit 22 on I 480 east
Cuyahoga	Bedford			23A	I-480 east / SR 14 east – Youngstown, Streetsboro	Southern terminus of I-480 concurrency; southbound exit and northbound entrance
Cuyahoga	Bedford			23B	SR 14 west (Broadway Avenue) / Forbes Road	Technically exit 23B on I-480 east
Cuyahoga	Bedford Heights	25.35– 25.40	40.80– 40.88	26A	I-480 west – Cleveland	Northern terminus of I-480 concurrency; northbound exit and southbound entrance
Cuyahoga	Bedford Heights	26.07– 26.26	41.96– 42.26	26B	Rockside Road – Bedford Heights	Signed as exit 26 southbound
Cuyahoga	Bedford Heights	26.80– 27.94	43.13– 44.97	27A	US 422 east – Warren	Southern terminus of US 422 concurrency; exit 13B on US 422
Cuyahoga	Bedford Heights	27.38– 27.94	44.06– 44.97	27B	Miles Road – Bedford Heights, North Randall	Northbound exit and southbound entrance
Cuyahoga	Bedford Heights	27.38– 27.94	44.06– 44.97	27B	I-480 west – Toledo	Southbound exit and northbound entrance; access via unsigned I-480N
Cuyahoga	Bedford Heights	27.6	44.4	—	I-271 north (Express Lanes) to I-90 – Erie Pa.	Northbound exit and southbound entrance; south end of Express Lanes
Cuyahoga	Bedford Heights	28.25– 28.38	45.46– 45.67	28A	SR 175 (Richmond Road) / Emery Road	Southbound exit and northbound entrance; other movements via exit 27B
Cuyahoga	Orange	28.61– 29.23	46.04– 47.04	28B	Harvard Road – Highland Hills, Orange	
Cuyahoga	Beachwood	29.62– 30.22	47.67– 48.63	29	US 422 west / SR 87 (Chagrin Boulevard)	Northern terminus of US 422 concurrency
Cuyahoga	Beachwood	31.2	50.2	—	I-271 north (Express Lanes) to I-90	Northbound exit and southbound entrance
Cuyahoga	Beachwood	31.8	51.2	—	I-271 south (Express Lanes) to I-480	Southbound exit and northbound entrance
Cuyahoga	Lyndhurst	32.42– 33.26	52.17– 53.53	32	Cedar Road / Brainard Road	
Cuyahoga	Mayfield Heights	33.2	53.4	—	I-271 south (Express Lanes) to I-480	Southbound exit and northbound entrance
Cuyahoga	Mayfield Heights	34.55– 35.45	55.60– 57.05	34	US 322 (Mayfield Road) – Gates Mills, Mayfield Heights	
Cuyahoga	Highland Heights	36.06– 36.52	58.03– 58.77	36	Wilson Mills Road	
Cuyahoga	Highland Heights–Mayfield line	37.6	60.5	—	I-90 east – Erie, PA	Northbound exit and southbound entrance; exit 190 on I-90
Cuyahoga	Highland Heights–Mayfield line	37.8	60.8	—	I-271 south (Express Lanes) to I-480	Southbound exit and northbound entrance
Lake	Willoughby Hills	36.59– 40.22	58.89– 64.73	40	I-90 to SR 91 – Cleveland, Erie, PA	Northern Terminus of I-271, signed as Exit 40A (I-90 West) and 40B (I-90 East), Exit 188 on I-90
1.000 mi = 1.609 km; 1.000 km = 0.621 mi: Concurrency terminus; Incomplete access
