= Lists of Interstate Highways =

List of lists

The following are lists of highways in the Interstate Highway System:

- List of primary Interstate Highways
- List of auxiliary Interstate Highways
- List of suffixed Interstate Highways
- List of business routes of the Interstate Highway System
- List of future Interstate Highways

== By state or territory ==
- Alabama
- Alaska
- Arizona
- Arkansas
- California
- Colorado
- Connecticut
- Delaware
- District of Columbia
- Florida
- Georgia
- Hawaii
- Idaho
- Illinois
- Indiana
- Iowa
- Kansas
- Kentucky
- Louisiana
- Maine
- Maryland
- Massachusetts
- Michigan
- Minnesota
- Mississippi
- Missouri
- Montana
- Nebraska
- Nevada
- New Hampshire
- New Jersey
- New Mexico
- New York
- North Carolina
- North Dakota
- Ohio
- Oklahoma
- Oregon
- Pennsylvania
- Puerto Rico
- Rhode Island
- South Carolina
- South Dakota
- Tennessee
- Texas
- Utah
- Vermont
- Virginia
- Washington
- West Virginia
- Wisconsin
- Wyoming

== See also ==
- List of United States Numbered Highways
