= Interstate 77 in Ohio =

Highway in Ohio

Interstate 77
- Vietnam Veterans Memorial Highway
- I-77 highlighted in red

Route information
- Maintained by ODOT
- Length: 163.03 mi (262.37 km)
- NHS: Entire route

Major junctions
- South end: I-77 at the West Virginia state line in Marietta
- SR 7 in Marietta; I-70 in Cambridge; US 40 in Cambridge; US 22 near Cambridge; US 250 in New Philadelphia; US 30 / US 62 in Canton; I-76 in Akron; SR 21 in Fairlawn; I-80 Toll / Ohio Turnpike in Richfield; I-480 in Independence
- North end: I-90 in Cleveland

Location
- Country: United States
- State: Ohio
- Counties: Washington, Noble, Guernsey, Tuscarawas, Stark, Summit, Cuyahoga

Highway system
- Interstate Highway System; Main; Auxiliary; Suffixed; Business; Future; Ohio State Highway System; Interstate; US; State; Scenic
← SR 76	→ SR 77

Interstate 77 (I-77) in Ohio is an Interstate Highway that runs for 163.03 miles (262.37 km) through the state. The highway crosses into Ohio on the Marietta–Williamstown Interstate Bridge over the Ohio River near Marietta. The northern terminus is in Cleveland at the junction with I-90. From the West Virginia state line to Cleveland, I-77 serves the cities of Marietta, Cambridge, New Philadelphia, Canton, Akron, and the Cleveland suburban city of Brecksville.

== Route description ==
Entering from West Virginia at Marietta via the Marietta–Williamstown Interstate Bridge, I-77 passes through rolling Appalachian terrain.

The interchange with I-70 at Cambridge was noted on the cover of the 1969 Ohio Department of Highways (ODOT) official highway map as being the "World's Largest Interchange", covering over 300 acres (120 ha) of land.

Other major Interstate Highways I-77 connects with in Ohio are I-76, I-80 (Ohio Turnpike), and I-90. The interchange with the Ohio Turnpike was completed December 3, 2001, providing direct access; previously, traffic had to exit at State Route 21 (SR 21) to get to the Turnpike.

I-77 is also known as the "Vietnam Veterans Memorial Highway" in Ohio, and the Willow Freeway in Greater Cleveland.

== History ==
=== Planned route ===
Originally planned to run from Port Huron, Michigan, to Charlotte, North Carolina, I-77 appeared on the original Interstate System route numbering plan in 1957. The part of I-94 from Detroit, Michigan, northeast to Port Huron was originally planned as I-77 in 1957; the current I-77 was I-79. When the current I-79 was added in Pennsylvania, the I-77 designation was moved to its current route, but the I-77 in Michigan also remained in the 1958 numbering plan, so the designation followed I-90 and I-75 in order to keep it continuous; the designation north of I-77's westward turn was to have been Interstate 177 (I-177). I-77 in Michigan later became part of I-94.

Initially, US Route 21 (US 21) traveled from Marietta to Cleveland. In 1962, I-77 debuted in Akron and Canton. By the end of 1971, US 21 was decommissioned in Ohio in favor of I-77 which was nearly complete. It was eventually finished in 1976 with the final connection being opened in Independence.

== Exit list ==
County	Location	mi	km	Exit	Destinations	Notes
Ohio River		0.00	0.00		I-77 south – Williamstown	Continuation into West Virginia
Ohio River		0.00	0.00	Marietta–Williamstown Interstate Bridge		
Washington	Marietta	0.17– 0.73	0.27– 1.17	1	SR 7 – Marietta, Marietta College	
Washington	Muskingum Township	5.76– 6.44	9.27– 10.36	6	SR 821 – Lower Salem, Marietta	
Washington	Aurelius Township	16.00– 16.72	25.75– 26.91	16	SR 821 – Macksburg, Dexter City	Access via CR 8 / Sherbourne Road
Noble	Olive Township	24.71– 25.63	39.77– 41.25	25	SR 78 – Caldwell, Woodsfield	
Noble	Belle Valley	28.50– 29.39	45.87– 47.30	28	SR 821 – Belle Valley	
Guernsey	Valley Township	37.70– 38.34	60.67– 61.70	37	SR 313 – Senecaville, Pleasant City, Buffalo	
Guernsey	Byesville	41.29– 42.09	66.45– 67.74	41	SR 209 / SR 821 – Byesville	Eastern terminus of SR 209, northern terminus of SR 821
Guernsey	Cambridge Township	43.72– 44.72	70.36– 71.97	44	I-70 – Columbus, Wheeling, WV	Signed as exits signed 44A (east) and 44B (west); I-70 exit 180
Guernsey	Cambridge Township	45.92– 46.65	73.90– 75.08	46	US 40 – Cambridge, Old Washington	Signed as exits signed 46A (east) and 46B (west) northbound; single exit southbound
Guernsey	Cambridge Township	47.52– 48.28	76.48– 77.70	47	US 22 – Cadiz, Cambridge	
Guernsey	Liberty Township	54.30– 55.10	87.39– 88.67	54	SR 541 / CR 831 – Kimbolton	Eastern terminus of SR 541
Tuscarawas	Salem Township	65.06– 65.52	104.70– 105.44	65	US 36 – Newcomerstown, Port Washington	
Tuscarawas	Jefferson Township	72.52– 72.88	116.71– 117.29	73	SR 751 – Stone Creek	Northern terminus of SR 751
Tuscarawas	New Philadelphia	80.53– 81.20	129.60– 130.68	81	US 250 east / SR 39 – Uhrichsville, New Philadelphia	Southern end of US 250 concurrency
Tuscarawas	Dover	83.20– 83.58	133.90– 134.51	83	SR 39 / SR 211 – Dover, Sugarcreek	
Tuscarawas	Dover	84.79– 85.30	136.46– 137.28	85	Schneiders Crossing Road – Dover	Interchange opened November 12, 2010
Tuscarawas	Franklin Township	87.38– 87.66	140.62– 141.08	87	US 250 to SR 21 – Strasburg, Massillon	Northern end of US 250 concurrency
Tuscarawas	Bolivar	93.23– 93.61	150.04– 150.65	93	SR 212 – Beach City, Bolivar, Zoar	
Stark	Pike–Canton township line	99.47– 99.87	160.08– 160.73	99	Fohl Street Southwest – Navarre	
Stark	Canton	101.21– 101.54	162.88– 163.41	101	SR 627 west / Faircrest Street Southwest – Massillon	Eastern terminus of SR 627
Stark	Canton	103.04– 103.36	165.83– 166.34	103	SR 800 south / Cleveland Avenue Southwest	Northern terminus of SR 800
Stark	Canton	104.02– 104.42	167.40– 168.05	104	US 30 / US 62 west – East Liverpool, Massillon, Wooster	Southern end of US 62 concurrency; signed as exits 104A (east) and 104B (west)
Stark	Canton	105.17– 105.52	169.25– 169.82	105	SR 172 / Tuscarawas Street West – Aultman Hospital, Downtown, Massillon	
Stark	Canton	106.11– 106.62	170.77– 171.59	106	13th Street Northwest – Cleveland Clinic Mercy Hospital, McKinley Memorial	
Stark	Canton	107.04– 107.98	172.26– 173.78	107A	SR 687 west / Fulton Road Northwest – Tom Benson Hall of Fame Stadium, McKinley High School, Pro Football Hall of Fame	Eastern terminus of SR 687
Stark	Canton	107.27– 107.62	172.63– 173.20	107B	US 62 east – Alliance, Youngstown	Northern end of US 62 concurrency
Stark	Plain Township	109.40– 110.44	176.06– 177.74	109	Everhard Road Northwest / Whipple Avenue / Belden Village Street – North Canton, Belden Village Mall	Signed as 109A (east) and 109B (west) northbound
Stark	Jackson Township	111.48– 111.81	179.41– 179.94	111	Portage Street Northwest – North Canton	
Stark	Jackson Township	112.61– 113.18	181.23– 182.15	112	Shuffel Street Northwest	Fred Krum Memorial Interchange, opened September 6, 2007
Summit	Green	113.85– 114.30	183.22– 183.95	113	Akron-Canton Regional Airport	
Summit	Green	117.91– 118.20	189.76– 190.22	118	SR 241 – Green, Massillon	
Summit	Green	120.03– 120.54	193.17– 193.99	120	South Arlington Road	
Summit	Coventry Township	122.61– 123.24	197.32– 198.34	122	I-277 west / US 224 – Barberton, Mogadore	I-277 exit 4, eastern terminus of I-277; signed as exits 122A (east) and 122B (west)
Summit	Akron	123.49	198.74	123A	East Waterloo Road	Southbound exit and northbound entrance
Summit	Akron	123.86– 124.17	199.33– 199.83	123B	SR 764 (East Wilbeth Road)	
Summit	Akron	124.66	200.62	124A	Archwood Avenue / Firestone Boulevard	Southbound exit and northbound entrance
Summit	Akron	125.16	201.43	124B	Lovers Lane / Cole Avenue	Former southbound exit only; closed November 29, 2021
Summit	Akron	125.16– 125.77	201.43– 202.41	125	I-76 east / SR 8 north – Cleveland, Youngstown	Southern end of I-76 concurrency; southern terminus of SR 8; signed as exits signed as 125A (SR 8 north) and 125B (I-76 east) northbound; no exit number northbound; Central Interchange
Summit	Akron	126.15– 126.37	203.02– 203.37	22B	Grant Street / Wolf Ledges Parkway	Closed June 14, 2017
Summit	Akron	126.58– 126.86	203.71– 204.16	22	Broadway / Main Street – Downtown	
Summit	Akron	127.28– 127.54	204.84– 205.26	21C	SR 59 north / Dart Avenue – Downtown	Southern terminus of SR 59
Summit	Akron	127.74	205.58	21B	Lakeshore Boulevard / Bowery Street	Southbound exit only
Summit	Akron	128.14– 128.38	206.22– 206.61	21A	East Avenue	Northbound exit and southbound entrance
Summit	Akron	128.57– 128.95	206.91– 207.52	129	I-76 west to I-277 – Barberton	Northern end of I-76 concurrency; no exit number southbound
Summit	Akron	129.33– 129.47	208.14– 208.36	130	SR 261 / Vernon Odom Boulevard	
Summit	Akron	130.54– 130.80	210.08– 210.50	131	SR 162 / Copley Road	
Summit	Akron	131.65– 132.01	211.87– 212.45	132	White Pond Drive / Mull Avenue	To Stan Hywet Hall and Gardens
Summit	Akron–Fairlawn line	133.19– 133.66	214.35– 215.10	133	Ridgewood Road / Miller Road	
Summit	Fairlawn	134.88	217.07	135	Cleveland-Massillon Road	Northbound exit and southbound entrance
Summit	Copley Township	135.50– 136.15	218.07– 219.11	136	SR 21 south – Massillon	Southern end of SR 21 concurrency
Summit	Copley Township	136.50– 137.06	219.68– 220.58	137	SR 18 – Medina	Exits signed as 137A (east) and 137B (west)
Summit	Bath Township	137.99– 138.36	222.07– 222.67	138	Ghent Road	
Summit	Richfield	142.94– 143.40	230.04– 230.78	143	SR 176 to I-271 / Wheatley Road	Southern terminus of SR 176
Summit	Richfield	143.62– 144.02	231.13– 231.78	144	I-271 – Columbus, Erie, PA	Same-directional movements only
Summit	Richfield	145.65– 145.86	234.40– 234.74	145	SR 21 north / Brecksville Road	Northern end of SR 21 concurrency; northbound exit and southbound entrance
Summit–Cuyahoga county line	Richfield–Brecksville line	145.78– 147.35	234.61– 237.14	146	I-80 Toll / Ohio Turnpike / SR 21 – Toledo, Youngstown	I-80 exit 173
Cuyahoga	Brecksville	147.76– 148.14	237.80– 238.41	147	Miller Road	
Cuyahoga	Broadview Heights	149.59– 150.23	240.74– 241.77	149	SR 82 – Brecksville, Broadview Heights	Exits signed as 149A (east) and 149B (west) southbound
Cuyahoga	Broadview Heights	151.58– 152.19	243.94– 244.93	151	Wallings Road	
Cuyahoga	Independence	152.81– 153.42	245.92– 246.91	153	Pleasant Valley Road	
Cuyahoga	Independence	155.19– 156.15	249.75– 251.30	155	Rockside Road	
Cuyahoga	Independence	155.51– 156.74	250.27– 252.25	156	I-480 – Toledo, Youngstown	I-480 exit 20
Cuyahoga	Cuyahoga Heights	157.40– 157.56	253.31– 253.57	157	SR 21 south (Brecksville Road)	Southbound exit and northbound entrance; northern terminus of SR 21
Cuyahoga	Cuyahoga Heights	158.42– 158.75	254.95– 255.48	158	Grant Avenue	
Cuyahoga	Newburgh Heights	159.09– 159.48	256.03– 256.66	159A	Harvard Avenue	
Cuyahoga	Cleveland	159.56– 160.03	256.79– 257.54	159B	Fleet Avenue	No southbound entrance
Cuyahoga	Cleveland	160.73	258.67	160	Pershing Avenue	Northbound exit and southbound entrance
Cuyahoga	Cleveland	160.97– 161.04	259.06– 259.17	161A	SR 14 (Broadway Avenue)	Northbound exit and southbound entrance
Cuyahoga	Cleveland	161.21– 161.81	259.44– 260.41	161B	I-490 / SR 10 east to I-90 west / I-71 / Opportunity Corridor – Toledo	Southern end of SR 10 concurrency; I-490 exit 2B
Cuyahoga	Cleveland	162.10– 162.57	260.87– 261.63	162A	US 422 / SR 8 / SR 10 west / SR 87 / Woodland Avenue / East 30th Street	Northern end of SR 10 concurrency
Cuyahoga	Cleveland	162.74– 163.02	261.90– 262.36	162B	East 22nd Street / East 14th Street	Northbound exit and southbound entrance
Cuyahoga	Cleveland	162.95	262.24	163A	East 9th Street / Ontario Street	Northbound exit only, formerly exit 163
Cuyahoga	Cleveland	163.10– 163.24	262.48– 262.71	163B	East 22nd Street	Northbound exit and southbound entrance; formerly exit 172B on I-90
Cuyahoga	Cleveland	163.10– 163.24	262.48– 262.71		I-90 east – Erie, PA.	I-90 exit 172A; northern terminus of I-77; direct access to I-90 westbound removed April 11–12, 2011
1.000 mi = 1.609 km; 1.000 km = 0.621 mi: Closed/former; Concurrency terminus; Incomplete access

== Auxiliary routes ==
Interstate 277 is a spur route in Akron connecting I-77 to I-76.

Interstate 77
Previous state: West Virginia	Ohio	Next state: Terminus
