= List of Interstate Highways in Ohio =

Interstate Highways of Ohio
- Highway markers for I-71, I-275, and BL-75

- A map of all the Interstate Highways in Ohio

System information
- Length: 1,572.35 mi (2,530.45 km)
- Formed: June 29, 1956

Highway names
- Interstates: Interstate nn (I-nn)
- Business Loops: Business Loop Interstate nn (BL I-nn)

System links
- Ohio State Highway System; Interstate; US; State; Scenic

There are 21 Interstate Highways in Ohio, including both primary and auxiliary routes. With the exception of the Ohio Turnpike (which carries portions of Interstate 76 (I-76), I-80, and I-90), all Interstate Highways in the state are owned and maintained by Ohio Department of Transportation (ODOT); however, they were built with money from the Federal Government. The total road mileage of the 21 Interstates is 1,572.35 miles (2,530.45 km). Ohio has more route miles than this, most of which comes from I-80 running concurrently with I-90 for 142.80 miles (229.81 km) and I-70 and I-71 running concurrently through Columbus. The Interstate Highways in Ohio range in length from I-71, at 248.15 miles (399.36 km), all the way down to I-471, at 0.73 miles (1.17 km).

As of 2019, out of all the states, Ohio has the fifth-largest Interstate Highway System. Ohio also has the fifth-largest traffic volume and the third-largest quantity of truck traffic. Ohio ranks second in the nation in terms of the number of bridges for its Interstates.

== History ==
On June 29, 1956, President Dwight D. Eisenhower signed the Federal Aid Highway Act of 1956, which called for the construction of up to 41,000 miles (66,000 km) of Interstate Highways. Of that, up to 1,500 miles (2,400 km) were to be built in Ohio. The same year, Ohio passed a law which raised the state's speed limit to 60 mph (97 km/h), and in 1957, Ohio began the construction of its Interstate Highway allotment. By 1958, Ohio had invested more money on its Interstate Highways than New York or California. Ohio had completed the construction of 522 miles (840 km) of pavement by 1960, 684 miles (1,101 km) by 1962, and 1,000 miles (1,600 km) by 1970. By the end of 1971, Ohio had only 167 miles (269 km) of Interstate still to build. On September 19, 2003, Ohio finally finished the originally planned Interstate Highways.

== Primary Interstates ==
Number	Length (mi)	Length (km)	Southern or western terminus	Northern or eastern terminus	Formed	Removed	Notes
I-70	225.60	363.07	I-70 at the Indiana state line	I-70 at the West Virginia state line	1960	current	
I-71	248.15	399.36	I-71/I-75 at the Kentucky state line	I-90 at Cleveland	1960	current	
I-73	—	—	I-73 at West Virginia state line	I-73 at Michigan state line	proposed	—	Proposed highway that would enter from West Virginia along U.S. Route 52 to Portsmouth, then use US 23 and other highways to Toledo before crossing into Michigan.
I-74	19.47	31.33	I-74 at the Indiana state line	I-75 at Cincinnati	1962	current	
I-75	211.55	340.46	I-71/I-75 at the Kentucky state line	I-75 at the Michigan state line	1960	current	
I-76	81.65	131.40	I-71 near Lodi	I-76 at the Pennsylvania state line	1972	current	
I-77	163.03	262.37	I-77 at the West Virginia state line	I-90 at Cleveland	1964	current	
I-80	237.48	382.19	I-80/I-90 at the Indiana state line	I-80 at the Pennsylvania state line	1960	current	218 miles (351 km) of I-80 is part of the Ohio Turnpike
I-80N	—	—	I-90/I-80 in Lorain County	I-80S/SR 5 in Braceville Township	1960	1962	Redesignated as I-80
I-80S	81.65	131.40	I-71 near Lodi	I-80S at the Pennsylvania state line	1960	1971	Redesignated as I-76
I-90	244.75	393.89	I-80/I-90 at the Indiana state line	I-90 at the Pennsylvania state line	1960	current	142 miles (229 km) of I-90 is part of the Ohio Turnpike
Former; Proposed and unbuilt

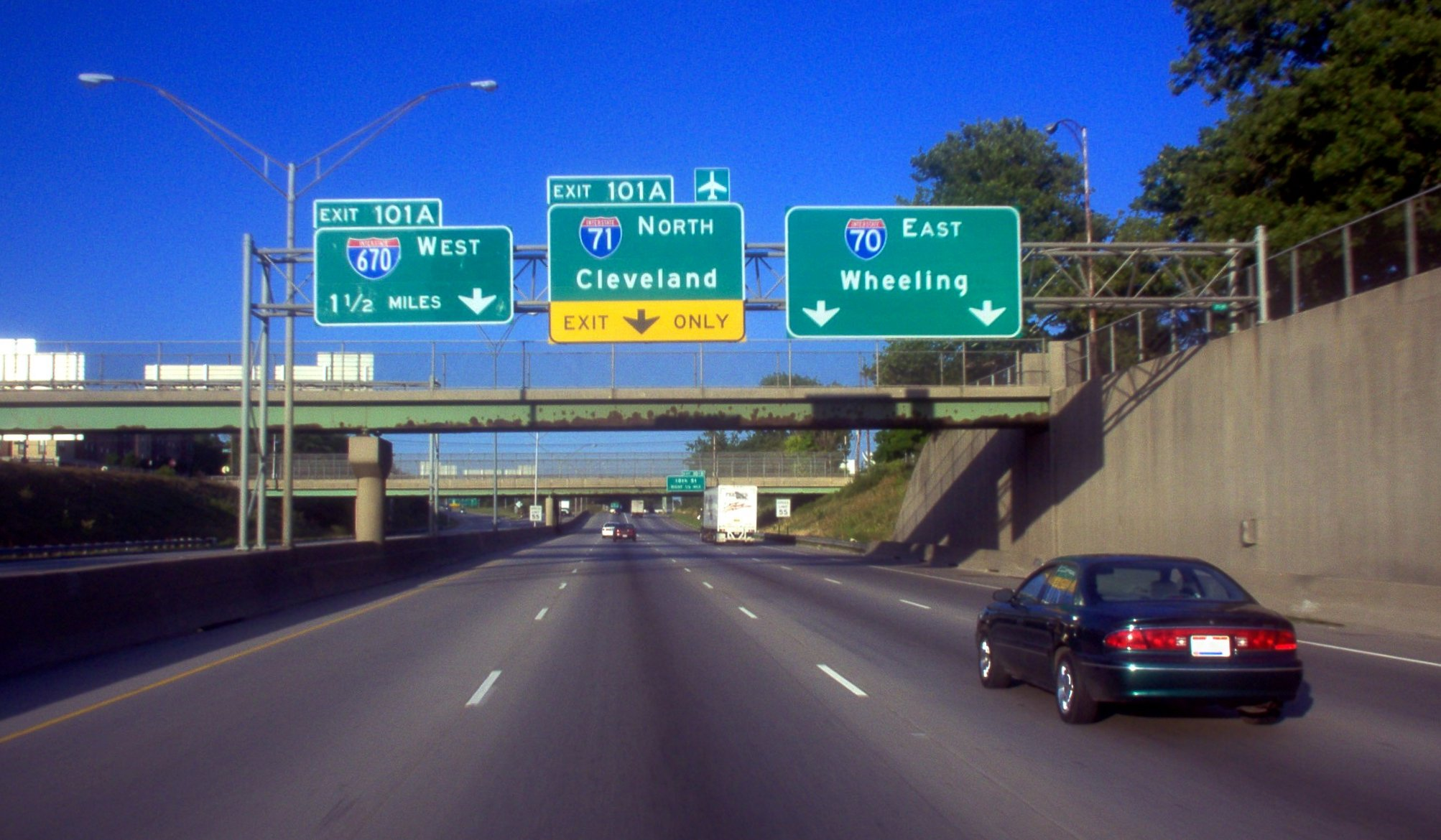
I-70 at the I-71 interchange near Columbus

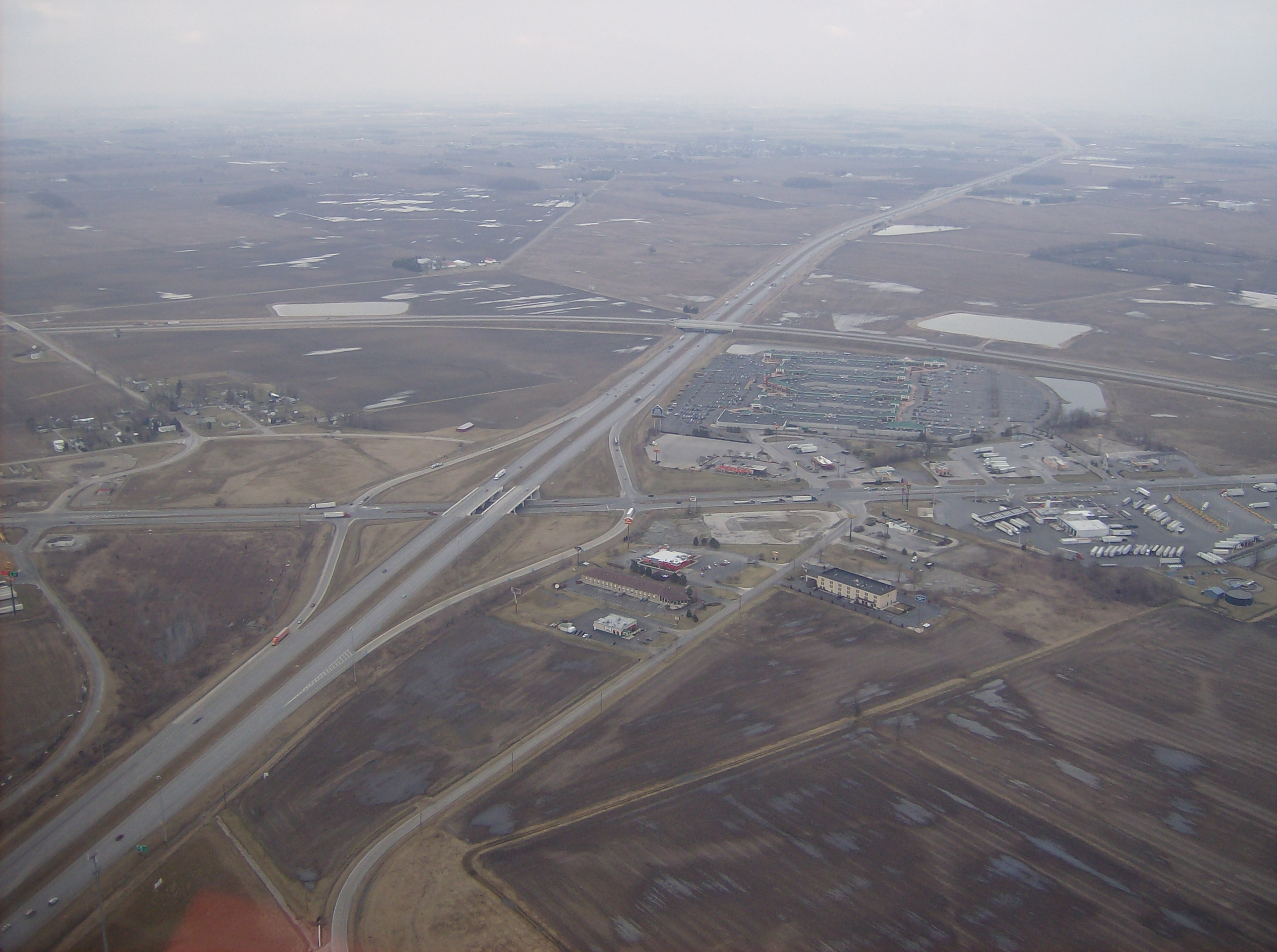
I-71 near West Lancaster and Octa

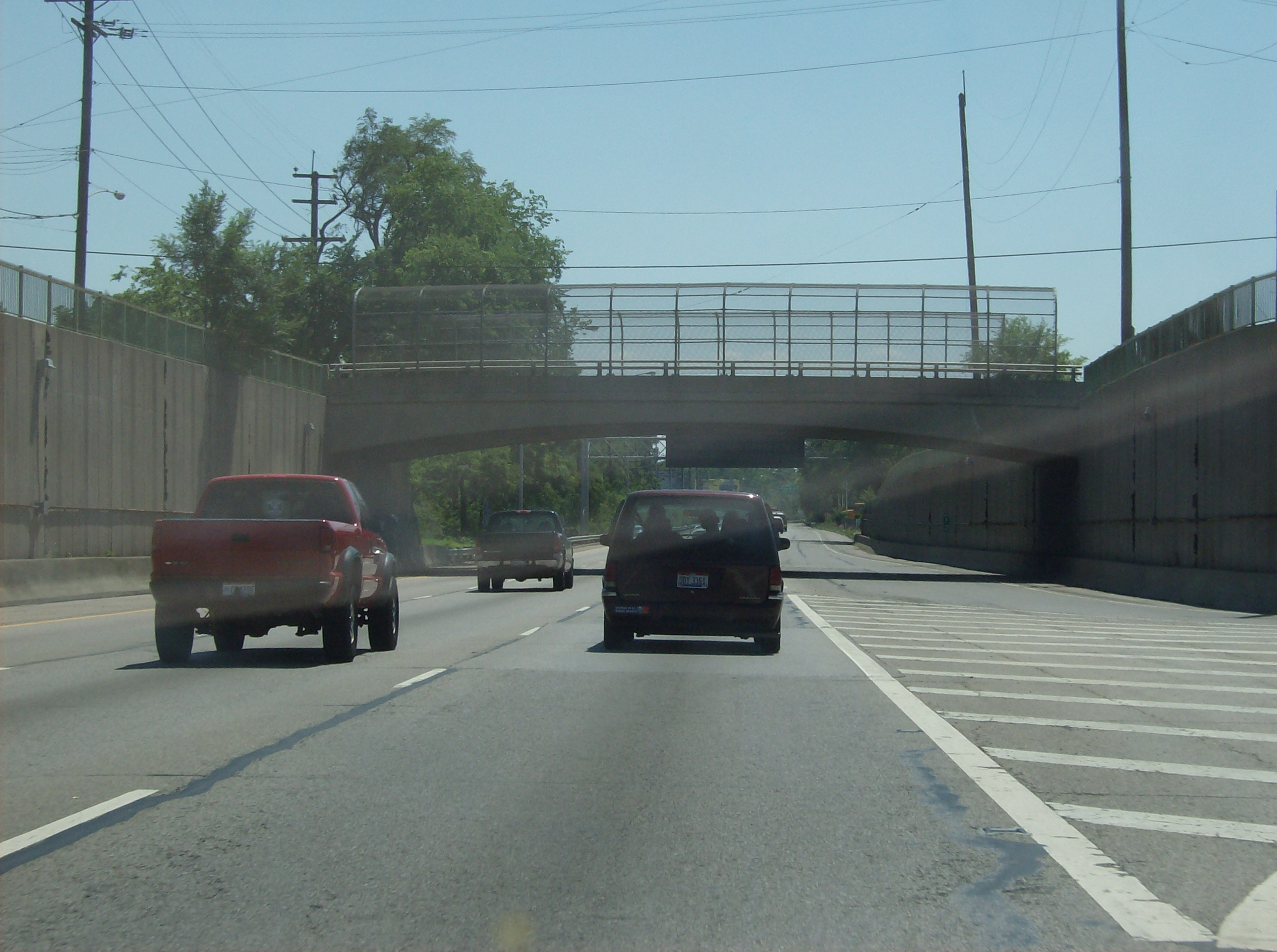
I-75 near the Lockland Miami and Erie Canal

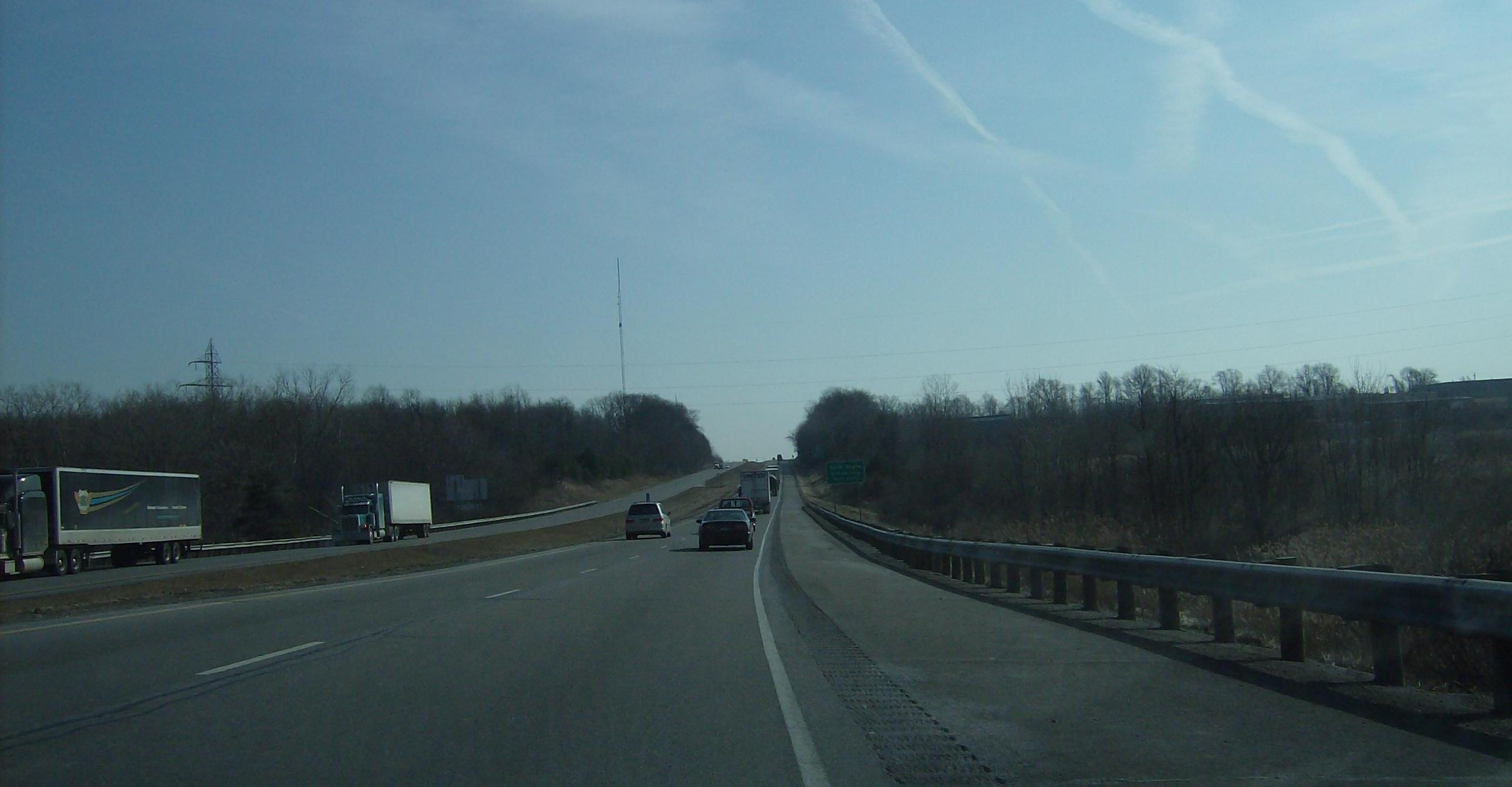
I-76 in Portage County

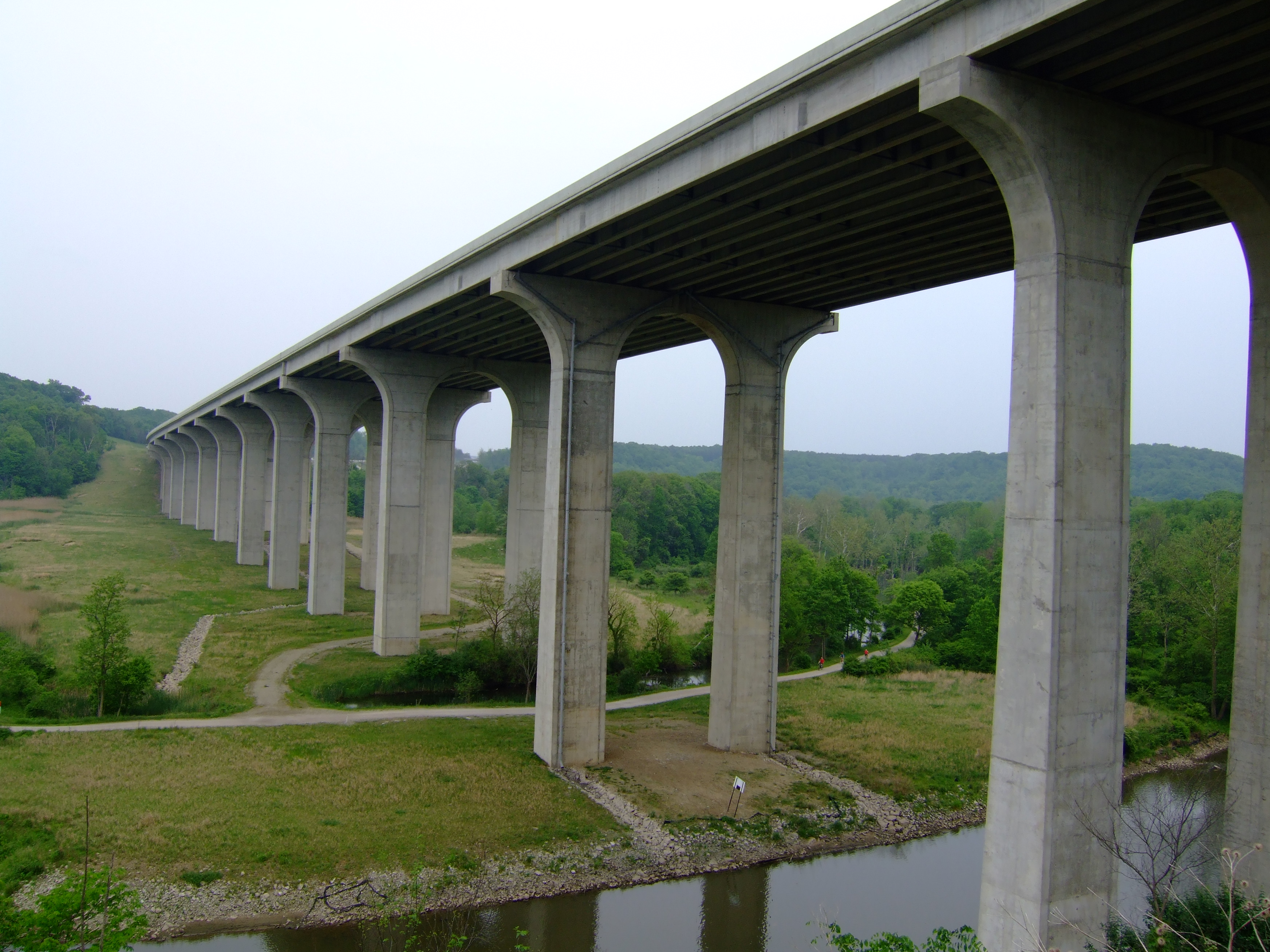
I-80 over the Cuyahoga River

== Auxiliary Interstates ==
Number	Length (mi)	Length (km)	Southern or western terminus	Northern or eastern terminus	Formed	Removed	Notes
I-270	54.97	88.47	I-71 at Grove City	US 23 at Columbus	1964	current	Beltway around Columbus
I-271	40.22	64.73	I-71 at Medina	I-90 at Willoughby Hills	1964	current	I-271 is east of Cleveland
I-275	56.041	90.189	I-275 at the Indiana state line	I-275 at the Kentucky state line	1962	current	Beltway around Cincinnati
I-277	4.14	6.66	I-76 at Akron	I-77/US 224 at Akron	1970	current	
I-280	12.41	19.97	I-80/I-90 at Lake Township	I-75 at Toledo	1959	current	First completed interstate in Ohio
I-290	—	—	I-90 in Cleveland	I-90/I-271 in Willoughby Hills	1964	1968	Signed along I-271 concurrency
I-290	—	—	I-90 in Cleveland	I-271 in Beachwood	1971	1973	Completed segment never opened (redesignated as I-490)
I-470	6.69	10.77	I-70 at Blaine	I-470 at the West Virginia state line	1976	current	
I-471	0.73	1.17	I-471 at the Kentucky state line	I-71 at Cincinnati	1981	current	
I-475	20.37	32.78	I-75 at Perrysburg	I-75 at Toledo	1964	current	Half beltway around Toledo
I-480	41.77	67.22	I-80 at North Ridgeville	I-80 at Streetsboro	1971	current	
I-480N	1.99	3.20	I-480 at Maple Heights	US-422 at Warrensville Heights	1974	current	spur freeway connecting I-480 to I-271 and US 422
I-490	2.43	3.91	I-71/I-90 at Cleveland	I-77 at Cleveland	1990	current	Will extend into SR 10
I-670	10.43	16.79	I-70 at Columbus	I-270 at Gahanna	2003	current	
I-675	26.53	42.70	I-75 near Miamisburg	I-70 near Fairborn	1987	current	
I-680	16.43	26.44	I-76 at North Lima	I-80 near Mineral Ridge	1964	current	
Former; Proposed and unbuilt

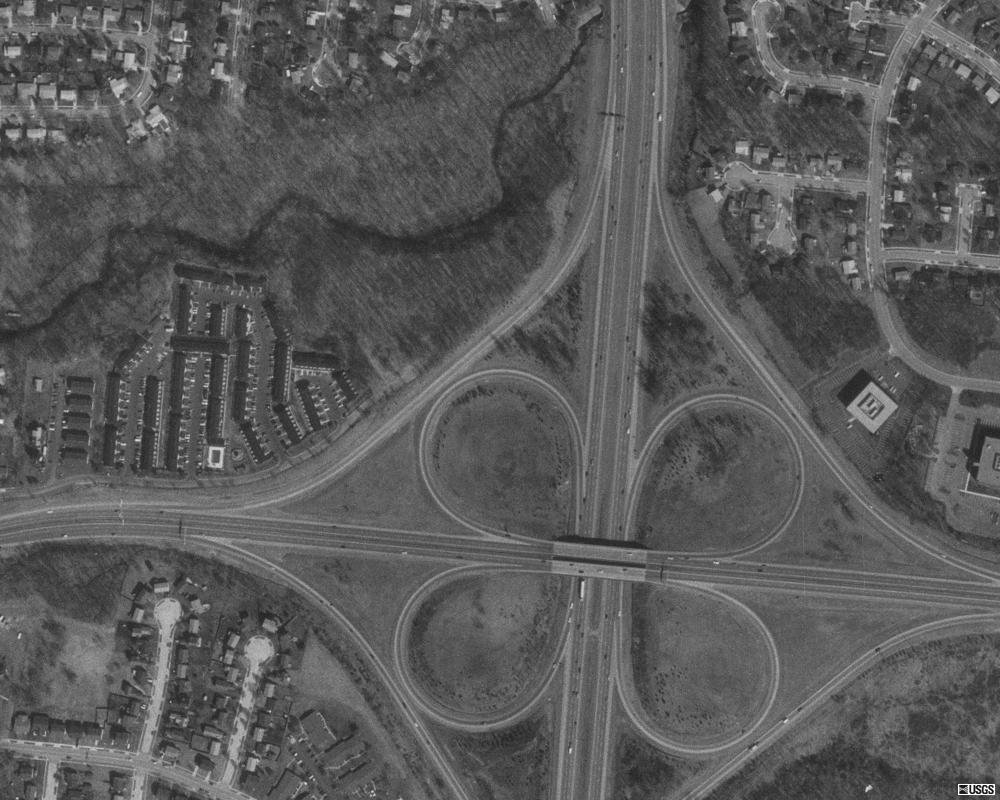
Cloverleaf interchange between I-270 and SR-161

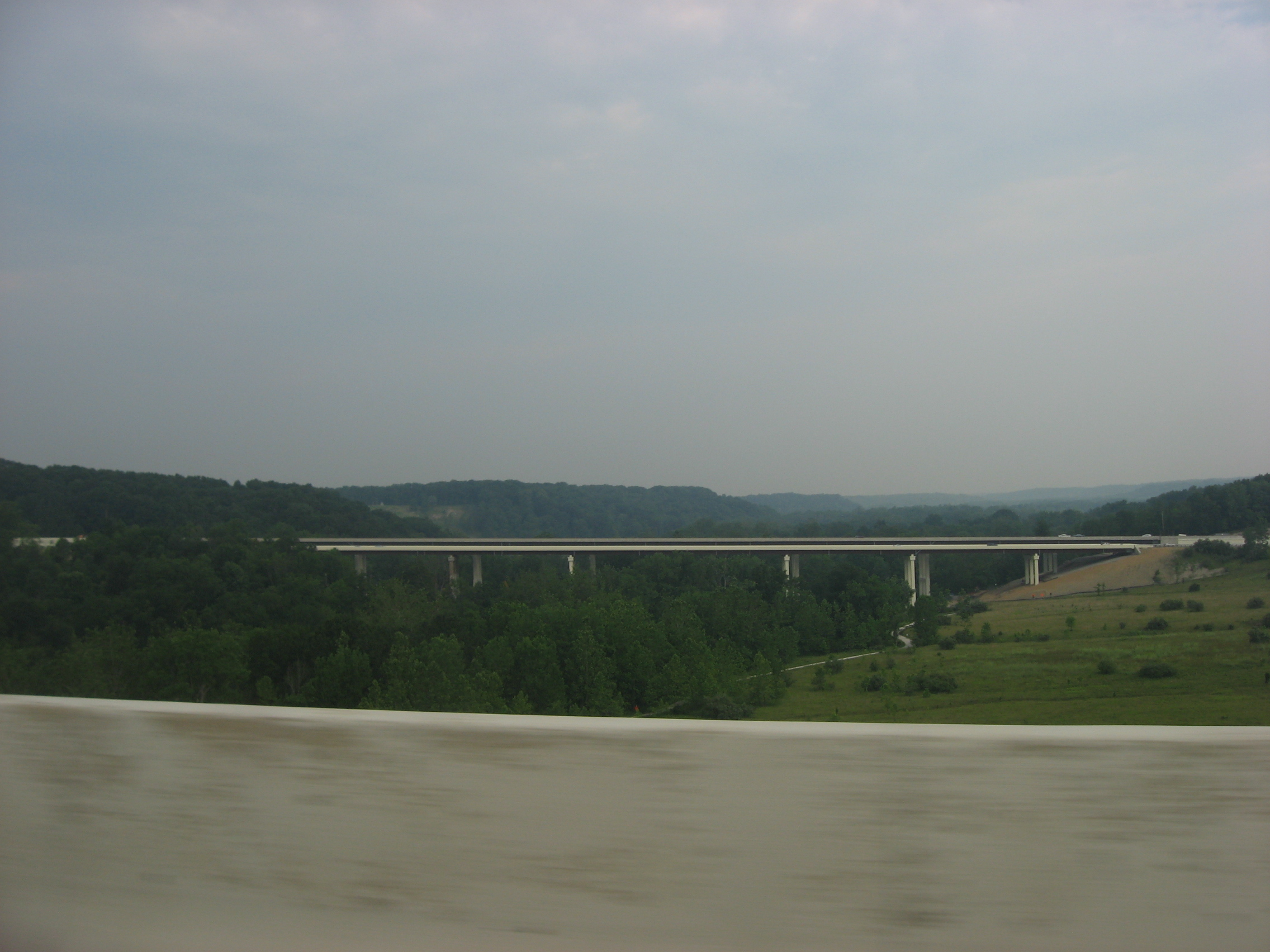
A picture of the I-271 bridge over the Cuyahoga River

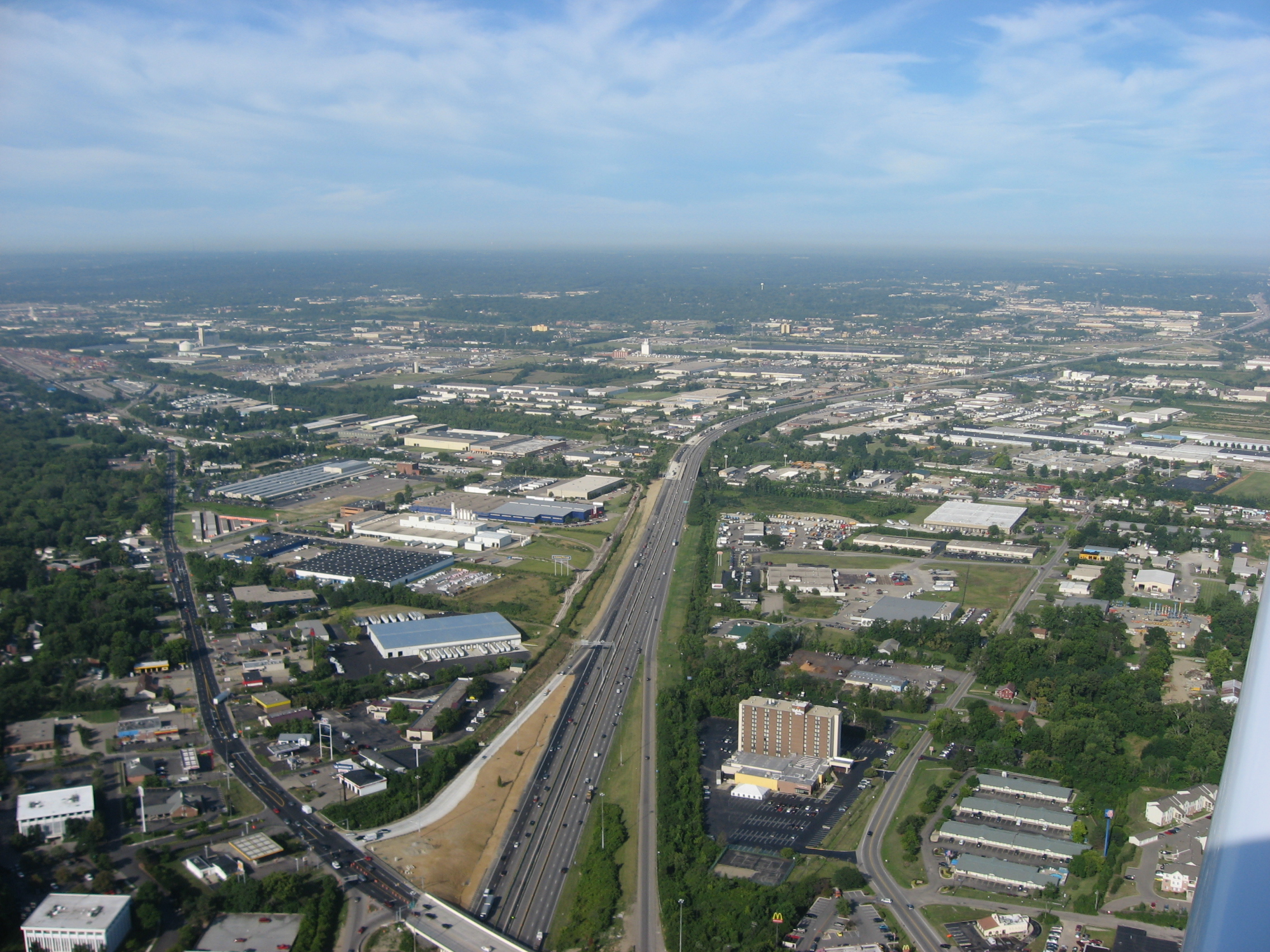
I-275 in the Sharonville neighborhood

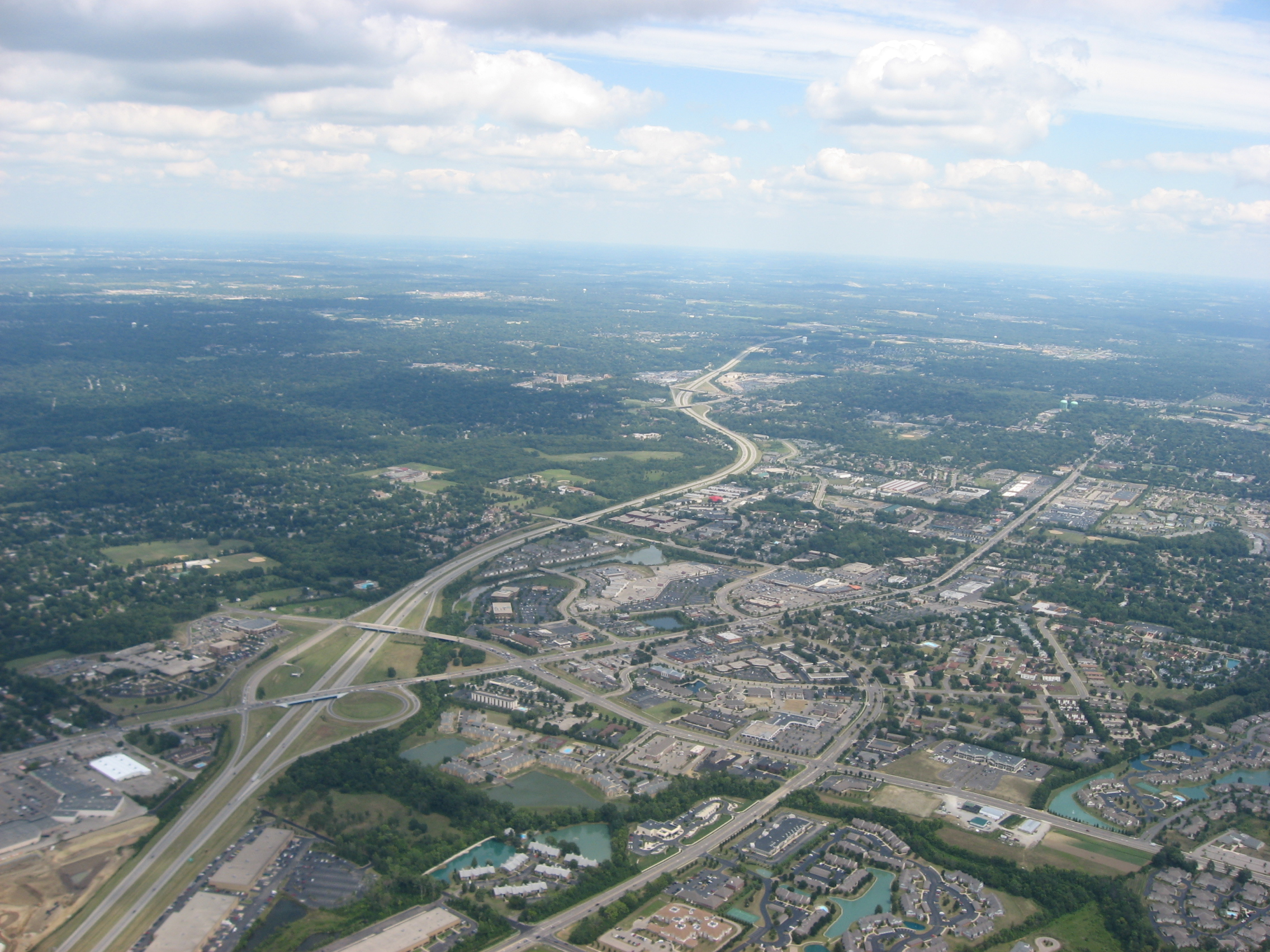
The I-675 double interchange southeast of Dayton

== Business routes ==
Number	Length (mi)	Length (km)	Southern or western terminus	Northern or eastern terminus	Formed	Removed	Notes
I-75 BL	8.5	13.7	I-75 in Troy	I-75 in Piqua	—	—	Runs along a former segment of US 25
I-75 BL	4.5	7.2	I-75 in Sidney	I-75 in Sidney	—	—	Runs along a former segment of US 25
I-75 BL	4.4	7.1	I-75 in Findlay	I-75 in Findlay	—	—	Most if not all segments were a former segment of US 25.
