= Alasmidonta atropurpurea =

Cumberland elktoe

Conservation status
- Endangered (IUCN 3.1)

- Critically Imperiled (NatureServe)

Scientific classification
- Kingdom: Animalia
- Phylum: Mollusca
- Class: Bivalvia
- Order: Unionida
- Family: Unionidae
- Genus: Alasmidonta
- Species: A. atropurpurea

Binomial name
- Alasmidonta atropurpurea (Rafinesque, 1831)

Species of bivalve

Alasmidonta atropurpurea, common name Cumberland elktoe, is a species of freshwater mussel, an aquatic bivalve mollusk in the family Unionidae, the river mussels.

== Description ==
The Cumberland elktoe has a thin, but not fragile, shell. The outside surface of the shell (periostracum) is smooth, somewhat shiny, and covered with greenish rays. Young specimens have a yellowish brown periostracum, while specimens of adults are generally much darker. The inside surface of the shell (nacre) is shiny, with the color being white, bluish white, or sometimes peach or salmon.

== Distribution ==
The Cumberland elktoe is endemic to the upper Cumberland River system, and it still exists in 12 mostly small tributaries in southeast Kentucky and north-central Tennessee.

The Cumberland elktoe is limited in distribution to the upper Cumberland River system in southeast Kentucky and north-central Tennessee, occupying streams both above and below Cumberland Falls. This species appears to have occurred only in the main stem of the Cumberland River and primarily its southern tributaries upstream from the hypothesized original location of Cumberland Falls near Burnside, Pulaski County, Kentucky. The original type locality was simply "river Cumberland," according to Clarke, who, upon ascertaining that the type specimen was lost, designated a neotype from the Clear Fork, a tributary to the Big South Fork, in Fentress County, Tennessee. All verified sites of occurrence are in the Cumberland Plateau Physiographic Province, giving it one of the most restricted ranges of any Cumberlandian species.

There has been confusion about the historical distribution of this species because of its similarity to a congener – the elktoe (Alasmidonta marginata). Museum and literature records of Alasmidonta marginata from the Cumberland River drainage on the Cumberland Plateau should be verified because they may actually represent the Cumberland elktoe. Cicerello and Laudermilk maintains that these two species occur sympatrically in the Rockcastle River, contrary to the assertion by Gordon and Layzer that they are allopatric.

The Cumberland elktoe has apparently been extirpated from the main stem of the Cumberland River and Laurel River and its tributary, Lynn Camp Creek. The status of the Cumberland elktoe from the heavily coal-mined New River watershed, where there is a single known record, is unknown. Based on recent records, populations of the Cumberland elktoe persist in 12 tributaries:

- Laurel Fork, Claiborne County, Tennessee and Whitley County, Kentucky and Marsh Creek, McCreary County, Kentucky
- Sinking Creek, Laurel County, Kentucky
- Big South Fork, Scott County, Tennessee, and McCreary County, Kentucky
- Rock Creek, McCreary County, Kentucky
- North White Oak Creek, Fentress County, Tennessee
- Clear Fork, Fentress, Morgan, and Scott counties, Tennessee
- North Prong Clear Fork and Crooked Creek, Fentress County, Tennessee
- White Oak Creek, Scott County, Tennessee
- Bone Camp Creek, Morgan County, Tennessee
- New River, Scott County, Tennessee

The latter nine streams, which comprise the Big South Fork system, may represent a single metapopulation of the Cumberland elktoe; there may be suitable habitat for the species and/or its fish hosts in intervening stream reaches, potentially allowing for natural genetic interchange to occur.

Considered a "rare species", few sites continue to harbor the Cumberland elktoe. Marsh Creek harbors the largest population known in Kentucky, and the population in Rock Creek is also sizable. In both streams the Cumberland elktoe represented the second most abundant unionid species. The Marsh Creek population, with at least three-year classes present, is viable, but the viability of the Rock Creek population is questionable. The largest population in Tennessee is in the Big South Fork system in the headwaters of the Clear Fork system, where several hundred specimens were found in muskrat middens in the late 1980s. Several age classes of the Cumberland elktoe were represented in samples taken from throughout the larger tributaries of the Big South Fork system in Tennessee during a 1985-86 survey.

== Ecology ==
=== Habitat ===
This species inhabits medium-sized rivers and may extend into headwater streams where it is often the only mussel present. Gordon and Layzer reported that the species appears to be most abundant in flats, which were described by Gordon as shallow pool areas lacking the bottom contour development of typical pools, with sand and scattered cobble/boulder material, relatively shallow depths, and slow (almost imperceptible) currents. They also report the species from swifter currents and in areas with mud, sand, and gravel substrates.

=== Hosts ===
Gordon and Layzer summarized the reproductive biology and identified fish hosts of the Cumberland elktoe. This anodontine species was found gravid from October through May, but they observed no fish infested with its glochidia until March. They found Cumberland elktoe glochidia to develop equally well on both fin and gill surfaces.

Five native fish species were parasitized by Cumberland elktoe glochidia:

- whitetail shiner (Cyprinella galactura)
- northern hogsucker (Hypentelium nigricans)
- rock bass (Ambloplites rupestris)
- longear sunfish (Lepomis megalotis)
- rainbow darter (Etheostoma caeruleum).

However, under laboratory conditions, juvenile specimens transformed only on the northern hogsucker. The period of glochidial encystment (i.e., until transformation into free-living juveniles) took 24 days, at 66.2° ± 5.4 °F (−14.8 °C).
