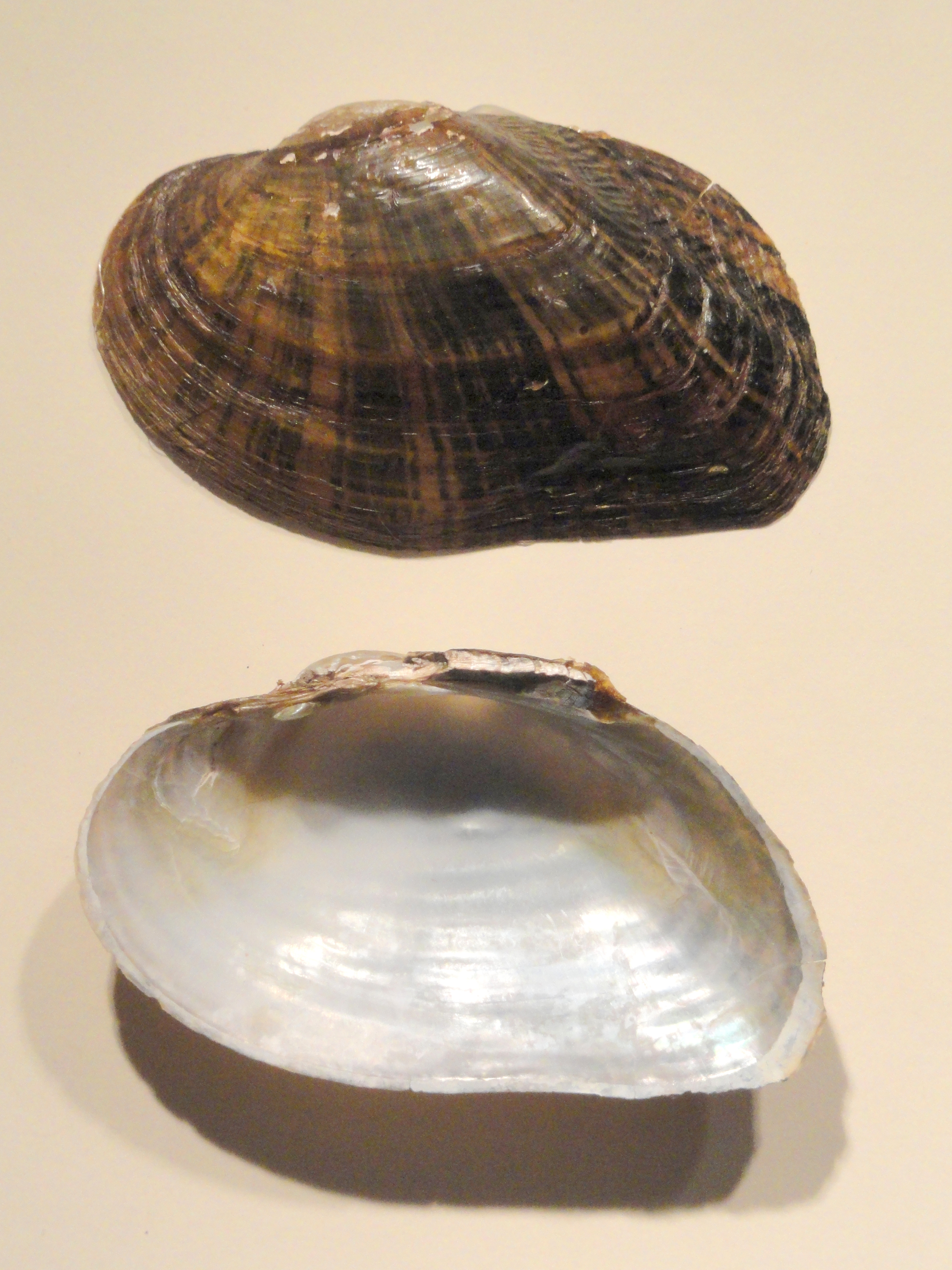

Conservation status
- Vulnerable (IUCN 3.1)

- Vulnerable (NatureServe)

Scientific classification
- Kingdom: Animalia
- Phylum: Mollusca
- Class: Bivalvia
- Order: Unionida
- Family: Unionidae
- Genus: Alasmidonta
- Species: A. varicosa

Binomial name
- Alasmidonta varicosa (Lamarck, 1819)

Synonyms
- Alismodonta varicosa (Lamarck, 1819)

= Brook floater =

Species of bivalve

The brook floater or swollen wedgemussel, Alasmidonta varicosa, is a species of freshwater mussel, an aquatic bivalve mollusk in the family Unionidae, the river mussels. It measures 25.1 mm to 80.2 mm in length although other research also suggests it rarely exceeds three inches (75 mm).

== Distribution ==
This species is found in Canada (New Brunswick and Nova Scotia) and northeastern United States (Connecticut, Georgia, Maine, Maryland, Massachusetts, New Hampshire, New Jersey, New York, North Carolina, Pennsylvania, South Carolina, Vermont, Virginia and West Virginia); It was formerly found in Rhode Island and four watersheds in Massachusetts but are now extinct in Rhode Island and almost extinct in Massachusetts. 1897 Research by Arnold Edward Ortmann showed it to be common in the Delaware and Susquehanna Rivers.

== Habitat and behavior ==
This mussel lives in high relief streams, under boulders and in sand. Research has shown that it is highly sensitive to increased thermal temperature. It associates with longnose and eastern blacknose dace, golden shiner, pumpkinseed, slimy sculpin and yellow perch.

== Survival threats and conservation ==
The brook floater is sensitive to habitat loss for development, dams and road crossings, pollution, summer droughts, trampling, sedimentation, flow alteration, and low oxygen conditions. Hybridization with elktoe (Alasmidonta marginata), a longtime ally, has also been shown to be a threat. Research has also shown the population is highly fragmented, low in density, prone to mortality due to old age and there are also low chances of longevity and viable reproduction. Trematoda rhopalocercous cercaria is a parasite of the brook floater. Current research shows populations that were large and widespread have declined by 50% to 95% to almost extinct.

While the IUCN lists it as Vulnerable, the states of New Jersey, Virginia, Massachusetts and New Hampshire all list it as Endangered, Threatened in Vermont, Maine and New York, Rare/Endangered in Connecticut, Extinct in Rhode Island and "Species of Special Concern" by the federal government.
