= Goodtime III =

Cleveland, Ohio tour boat

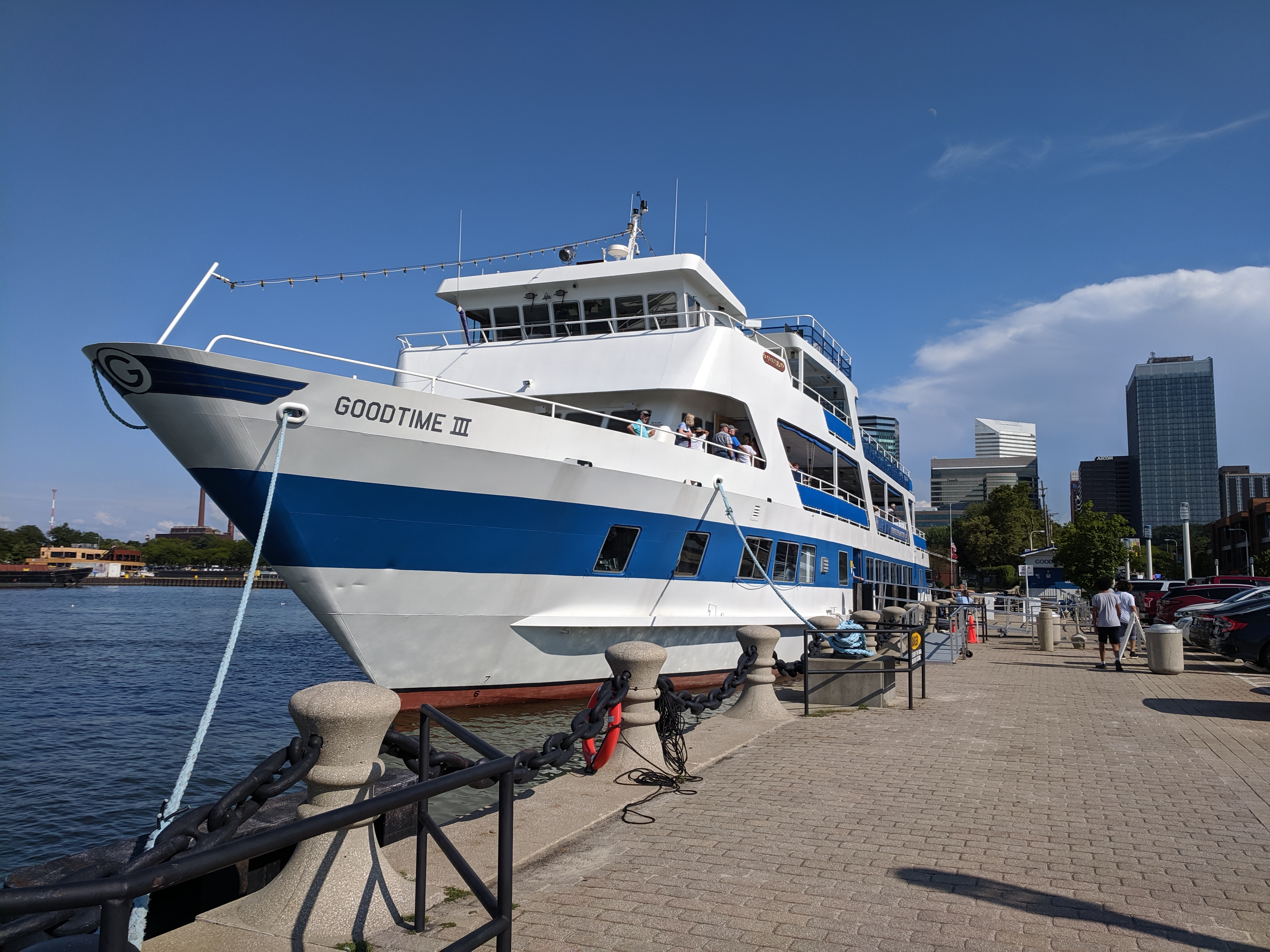
MV Goodtime III docked in Cleveland, Ohio at the Ninth Street Pier in 2019.

The MV Goodtime III is the third generation of sightseeing boats that cruise and tours the Cuyahoga River and Cleveland Harbor. The boat can hold 1,000 passengers, has four decks and indoor and outdoor seating. Tours of the Cleveland area waterways are narrated and include local and natural history. The boats and the cruise tours have been owned and operated by the Fryan family since 1958.

== About ==
The MV Goodtime III is the largest excursion boat in Cleveland, Ohio and is able to hold up to 1,000 passengers. The four-deck boat is equipped with 3 bars and 2 dance floors. Its dimensions are 151-by-40 feet. The boat provides sightseeing tours of the Cuyahoga River and Lake Erie that include both local and natural history of the region. There is both indoor and outdoor seating and a dining area. The Goodtime III averages about 300 tours a year.

== History of the Goodtime Cruises ==
The Goodtime III is part of a series of boats named MV Goodtime, MV Goodtime I and MV Goodtime II. The first Goodtime tour took place on the MV Goodtime in 1958 when brothers, Vince and Herb Fryan started taking the 150-passenger boat out for tours on the Cuyahoga River, and Cleveland Harbor. The Fryan brothers sold the MV Goodtime in 1965, keeping only the larger MV Goodtime II. The MV Goodtime II could hold up to 475 guests. MV Goodtime II was renamed MV Liberty Bell II and operated in Philadelphia, Pennsylvania and later in Venice, Florida as the MV Vegas until it was scrapped in 2010. The MV Goodtime I is still operating in Sandusky, Ohio, but is not longer owned by the Fryan family. These boats were in turn named after the SS Goodtime that carried passengers on Lake Erie and was run by the Cleveland and Buffalo Transit Company between 1924 and 1938. This steamship was originally named the SS City of Detroit II and had been built in 1889.

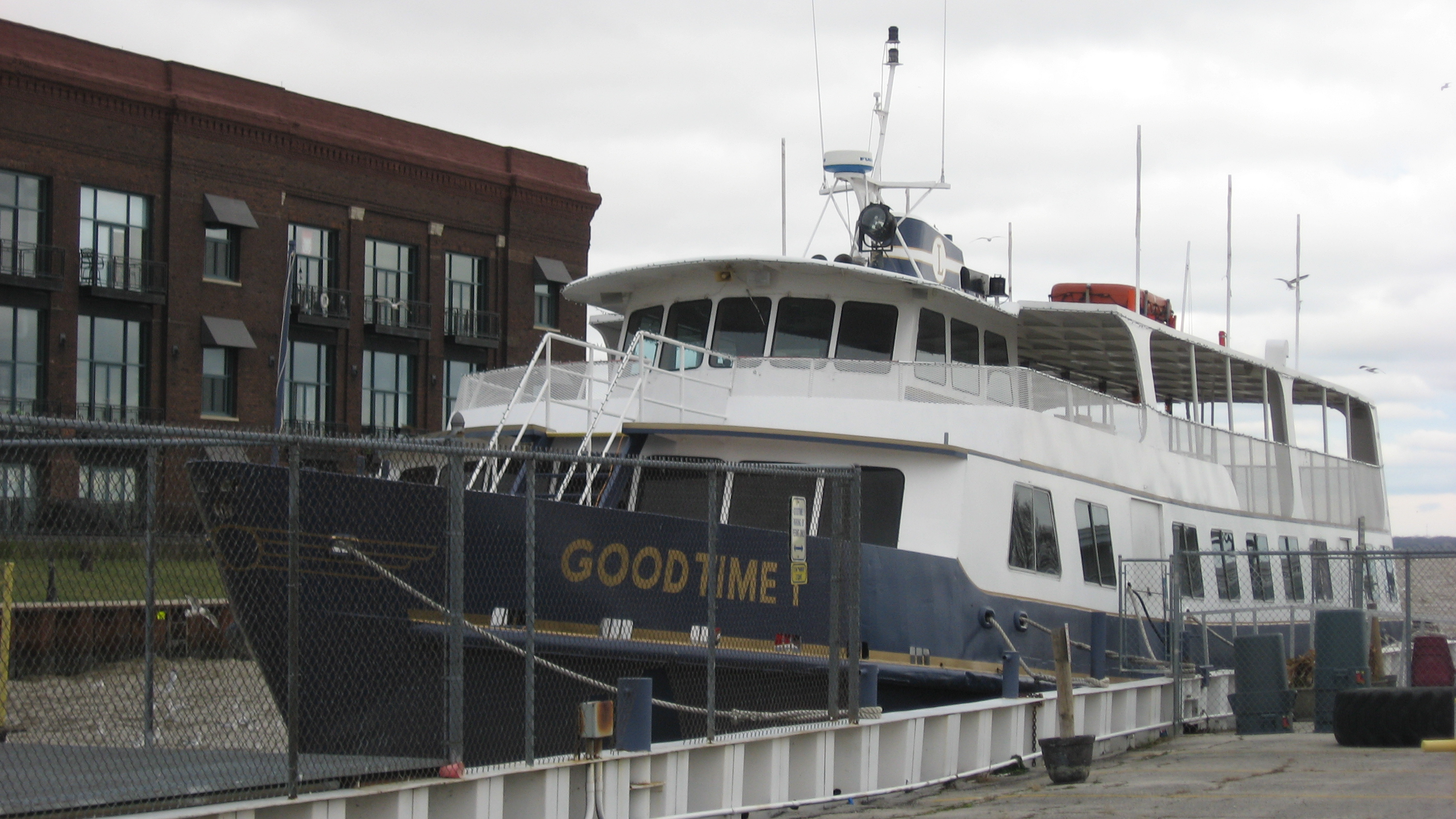
The MV Goodtime I in Sandusky, Ohio at one time was owned by the Fryan family.

The Fryan brothers sold the business to Vince's son, Jim Fryan in 1984. Rick Fryan, grandson of Vince, currently runs the Goodtime III. He started working as a deckhand and salesman for the company in 1986. Jim Fryan decided to build MV Goodtime III in 1988. MV Goodtime III arrived in Cleveland in September 1990 The new Goodtime III started public cruising season in 1991.

From 1980 up until 2013, the Goodtime II, and Goodtime III was captained by Bruce M. Hudec who started as deckhand in 1971 and worked his way up to captain. Captain Hudec died on December 5, 2014.
