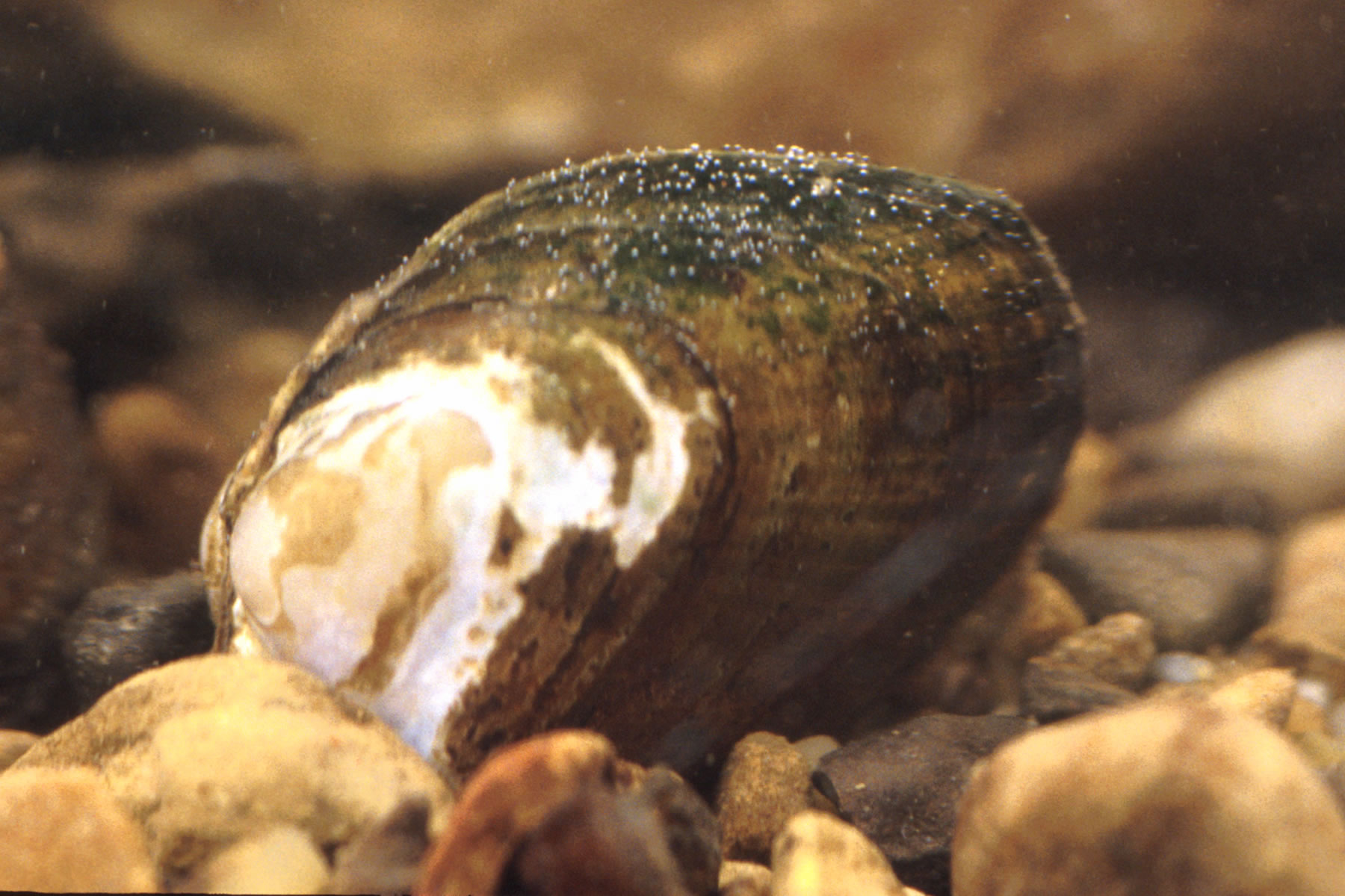

Conservation status
- Least Concern (IUCN 3.1)

- Apparently Secure (NatureServe)

Scientific classification
- Kingdom: Animalia
- Phylum: Mollusca
- Class: Bivalvia
- Order: Unionida
- Family: Unionidae
- Genus: Alasmidonta
- Species: A. viridis

Binomial name
- Alasmidonta viridis (Rafinesque, 1820)

Synonyms
- Unio (Elliptio) viridis Rafinesque, 1820

= Alasmidonta viridis =

Species of bivalve

Alasmidonta viridis, the slippershell mussel, is a species of mussel in the family Unionidae, the river mussels. It is found in the central and eastern United States and in Ontario, Canada. It is threatened in parts of its range, but it is not threatened as a species.

Alasmidonta viridis primarily occurs in creeks and headwaters of rivers, but has also been found in larger rivers and in lakes.
