= Alasmidonta robusta =

Conservation status
- Extinct (IUCN 2.3)

- Presumed Extinct (NatureServe)

Scientific classification
- Kingdom: Animalia
- Phylum: Mollusca
- Class: Bivalvia
- Order: Unionida
- Family: Unionidae
- Genus: Alasmidonta
- Species: †A. robusta

Binomial name
- †Alasmidonta robusta Clarke, 1981
- Location of Montgomery County, North Carolina

Species of bivalve

Alasmidonta robusta, the Carolina elktoe, was a species of freshwater mussel, an aquatic bivalve mollusk in the family Unionidae, the river mussels.

== Distribution ==
This species was endemic to North Carolina, and was known only from its type specimen collected in Montgomery County, North Carolina. It was first described in 1981. No specimens have been found since, and are presumed extinct.
