= Alasmidonta wrightiana =

Conservation status
- Extinct (IUCN 2.3)

- Possibly Extinct (NatureServe)

Scientific classification
- Kingdom: Animalia
- Phylum: Mollusca
- Class: Bivalvia
- Order: Unionida
- Family: Unionidae
- Genus: Alasmidonta
- Species: †A. wrightiana

Binomial name
- †Alasmidonta wrightiana (Walker, 1901)
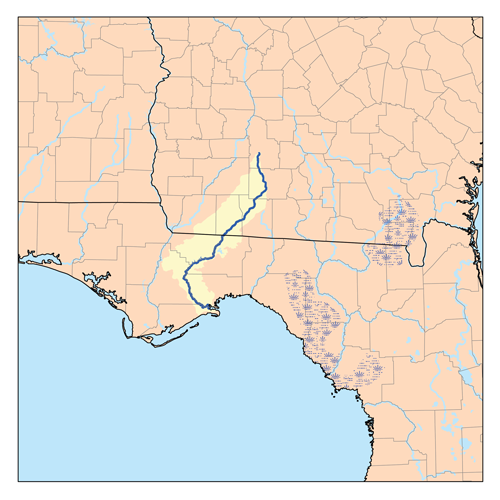
- Location of the Ochlockonee River

Species of bivalve

Alasmidonta wrightiana, the Ochlockonee arcmussel, was a species of freshwater mussel, an aquatic bivalve mollusk in the family Unionidae, the river mussels.

This species was endemic to the Ochlockonee River in Florida and Georgia. This river mussel is now extinct.
