= Altamaha arcmussel =

Conservation status
- Endangered (IUCN 3.1)

- Imperiled (NatureServe)

Scientific classification
- Kingdom: Animalia
- Phylum: Mollusca
- Class: Bivalvia
- Order: Unionida
- Family: Unionidae
- Genus: Alasmidonta
- Species: A. arcula

Binomial name
- Alasmidonta arcula (I. Lea, 1838)

Species of bivalve

The Altamaha arcmussel (Alasmidonta arcula) is a species of freshwater mussel, an aquatic bivalve in the family Unionidae.

It is an endangered species.

== Distribution ==
This species is endemic to the United States.

== Habitat ==
This mussel lives in rivers.

== Conservation status ==
This species is threatened by habitat loss.
