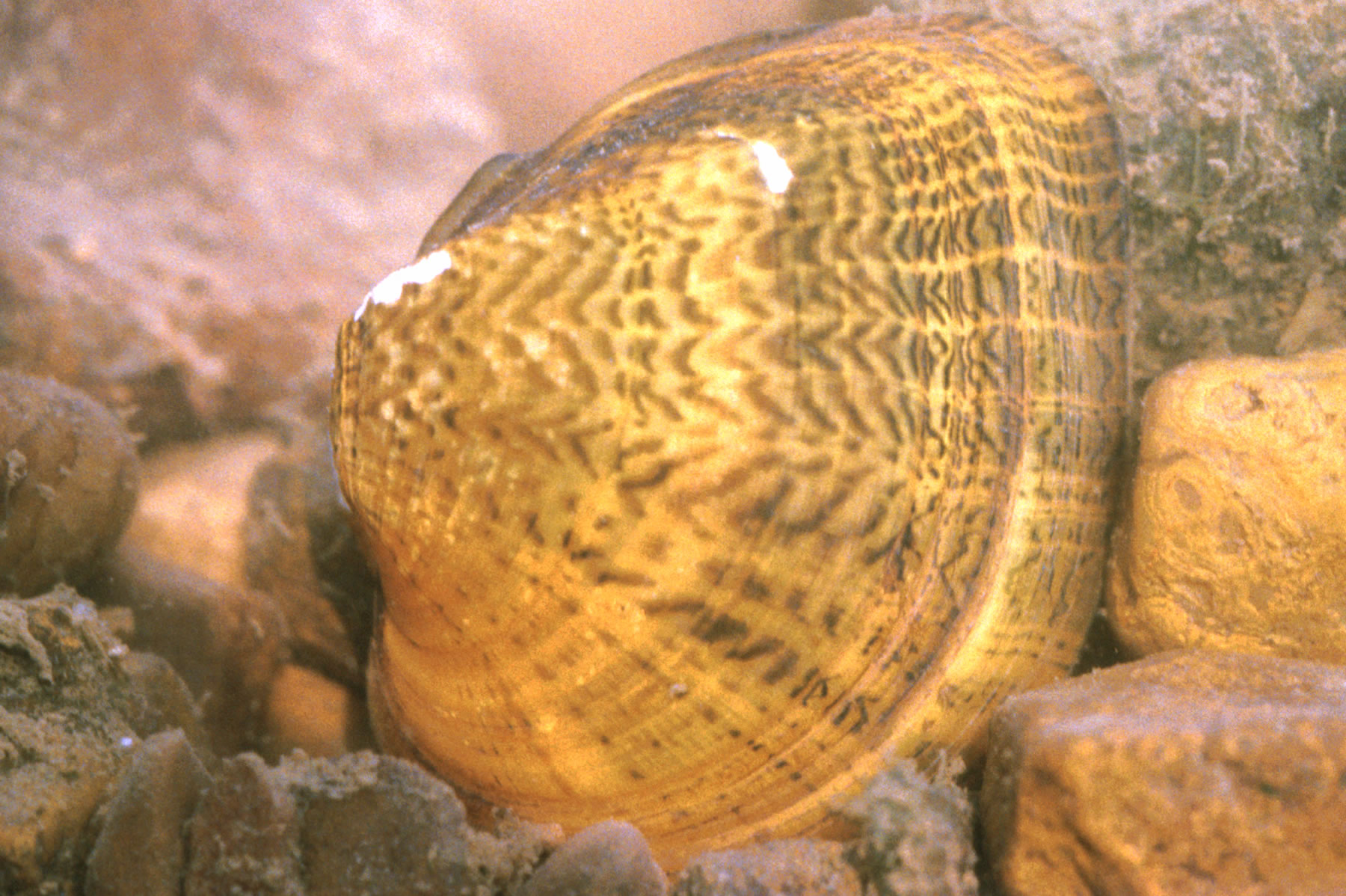
- Truncilla truncata

Scientific classification
- Domain: Eukaryota
- Kingdom: Animalia
- Phylum: Mollusca
- Class: Bivalvia
- Order: Unionida
- Family: Unionidae
- Tribe: Lampsilini
- Genus: Truncilla; Rafinesque, 1819

= Truncilla =

Genus of bivalves

Truncilla is a genus of freshwater mussels, aquatic bivalve mollusks in the family Unionidae, the river mussels.

== Species within the genus Truncilla ==
- Truncilla donaciformis
- Truncilla macrodon
- Truncilla truncata
