= Cuyahoga River =

River in Ohio, United States

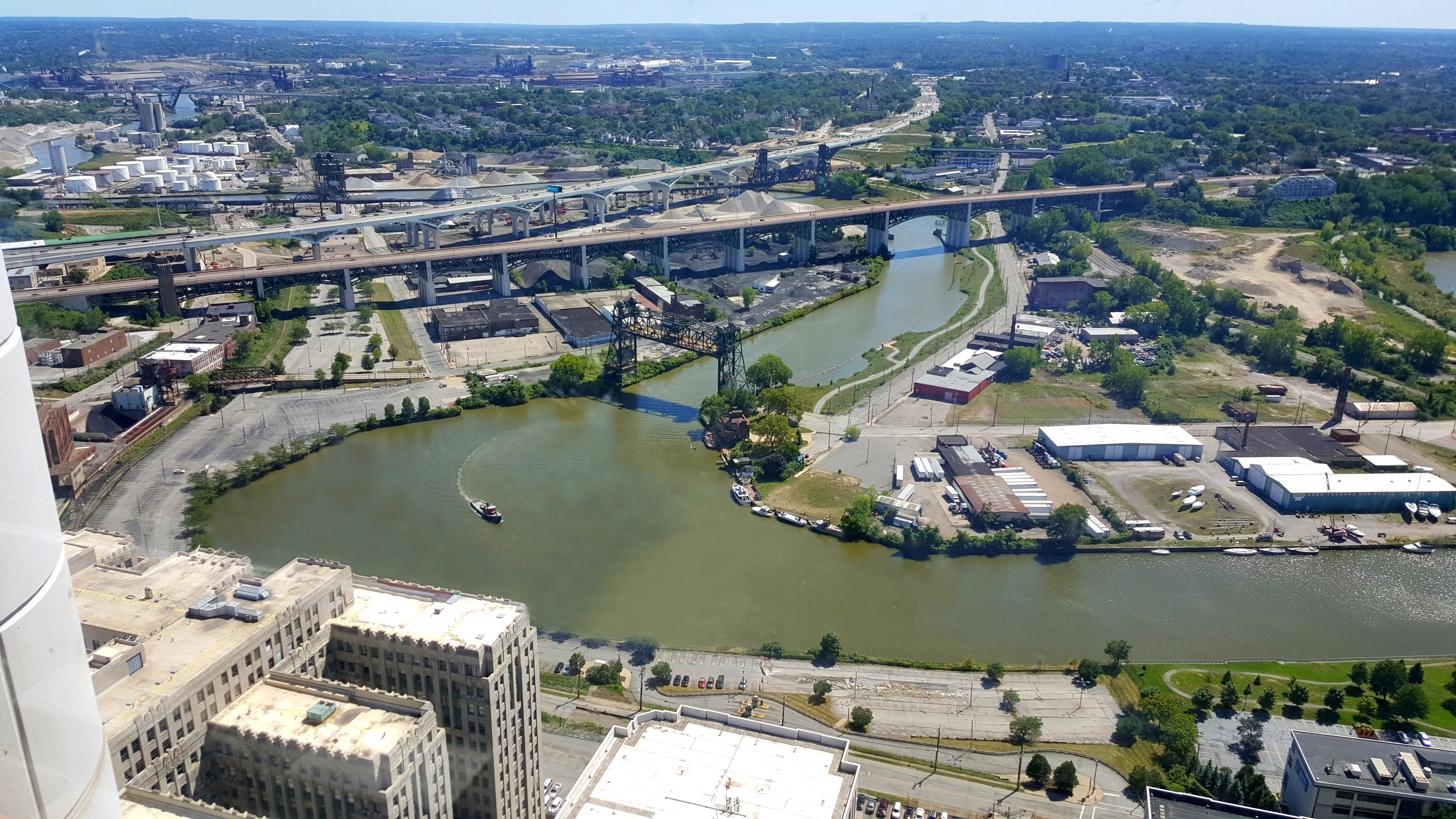
- The Cuyahoga River in Cleveland

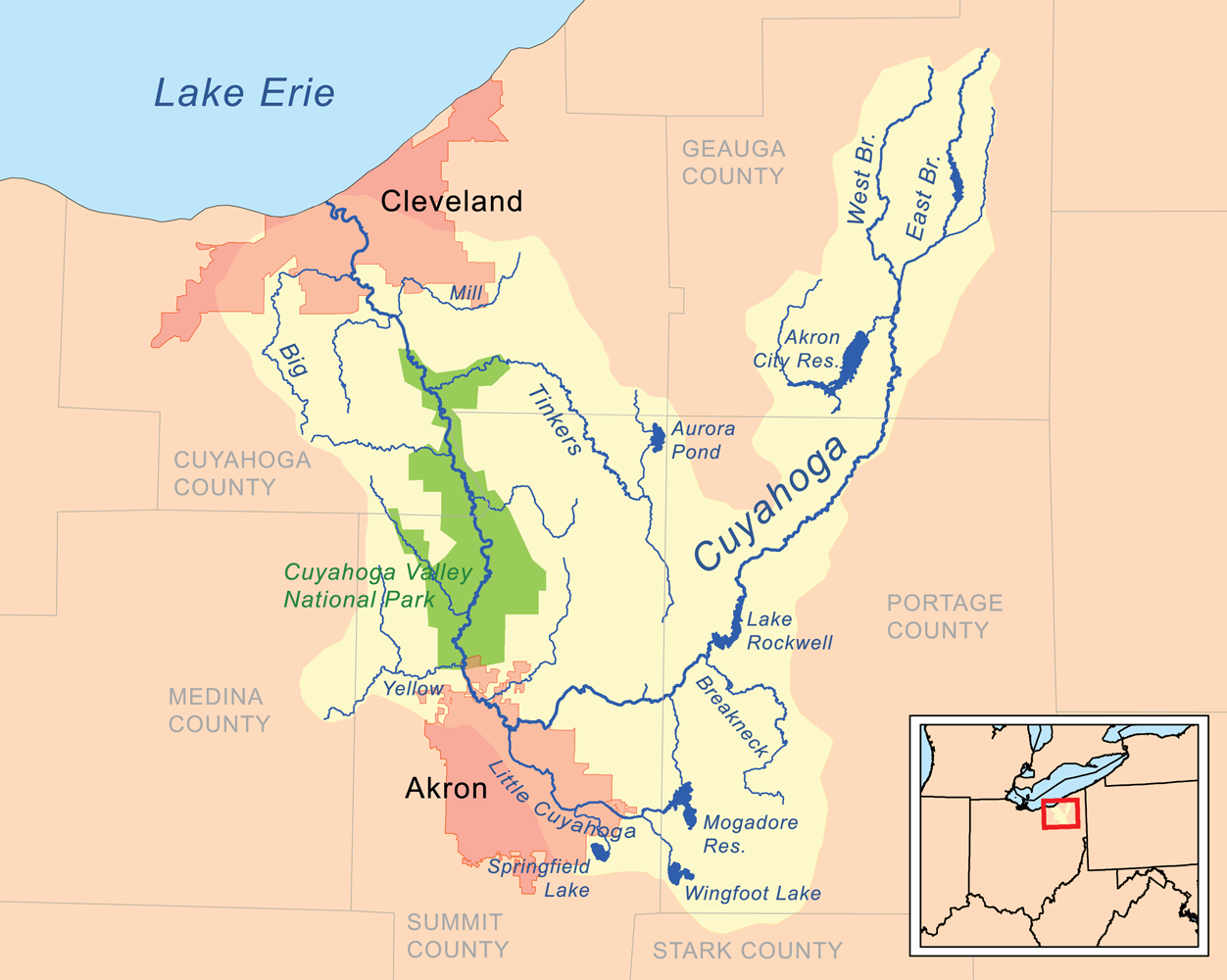
- Map of the Cuyahoga River drainage basin

Location
- Country: United States
- State: Ohio
- Counties: Cuyahoga, Summit, Portage, Geauga
- Cities: Cleveland, Akron, Cuyahoga Falls, Kent

Physical characteristics
- Source
  - coordinates: 41°26′26″N 81°09′07″W Confluence of East Branch Cuyahoga River and West Branch Cuyahoga River near Pond Road and Rapids Road, Burton, Geauga County, Ohio
  - elevation: 1,093 feet (333.1 m)
- Mouth
  - location: Lake Erie at Cleveland, Cuyahoga County, Ohio
  - coordinates: 41°30′13″N 81°42′44″W
  - elevation: 571 feet (174.0 m)
- Length: 84.9 miles (136.6 km)
- Basin size: 809 square miles (2,100 km^{2})

The Cuyahoga River (see § Pronunciation) is a river located in Northeast Ohio that feeds into Lake Erie.

The Cuyahoga River bisects the city of Cleveland. As Cleveland emerged as a major manufacturing center, the river became heavily affected by industrial pollution, so much so that it caught fire at least 14 times. When it did so on June 22, 1969, news coverage of the event helped to spur the American environmental movement. For many Americans, the Cuyahoga's burning helped connect urban decay with the environmental crisis at the time in many American cities. Since then, the river has been extensively cleaned up through the efforts of Cleveland's city government and the Ohio Environmental Protection Agency (OEPA). In 2019, the American Rivers conservation association named the Cuyahoga "River of the Year" in honor of "50 years of environmental resurgence".

In 2025, the river between the Gorge Dam and the mouth was designated a National Water Trail, a type of National Recreation Trail.

== Etymology ==
The name Cuyahoga is believed to mean "crooked river" from the Mohawk name Cayagaga, although the Mohawk were never in the region alongside European settlers, so this explanation is questionable. Some think that it comes from the Seneca word for "jawbone". This explanation, however, is as uncertain as the Mohawk explanation. A close match in the Seneca language is Gayó'ha'geh, meaning "on your chin"; the river's crooked form does vaguely resemble an animal's jawbone. It is possible that Europeans once wished to call it that, but the name "Cuyahoga" ended up becoming more prevalent and folk etymology took over, creating an accidental link between the two names that did not actually exist.

Early maps from the era of French control of the region, when the Wyandot were the only tribe there, mark the river as "Cuyahoga", although the Wyandot name for the river is Yažaʔyeh. This word roughly translates to English as “on the wing”.

=== Pronunciation ===
The correct pronunciation of "Cuyahoga" is disputed; it may be pronounced /ˌkaɪ.əˈhɒɡə/ KY-ə-HOG-ə or /ˌkaɪ.əˈhoʊɡə/ KY-ə-HOH-gə.

== Course ==
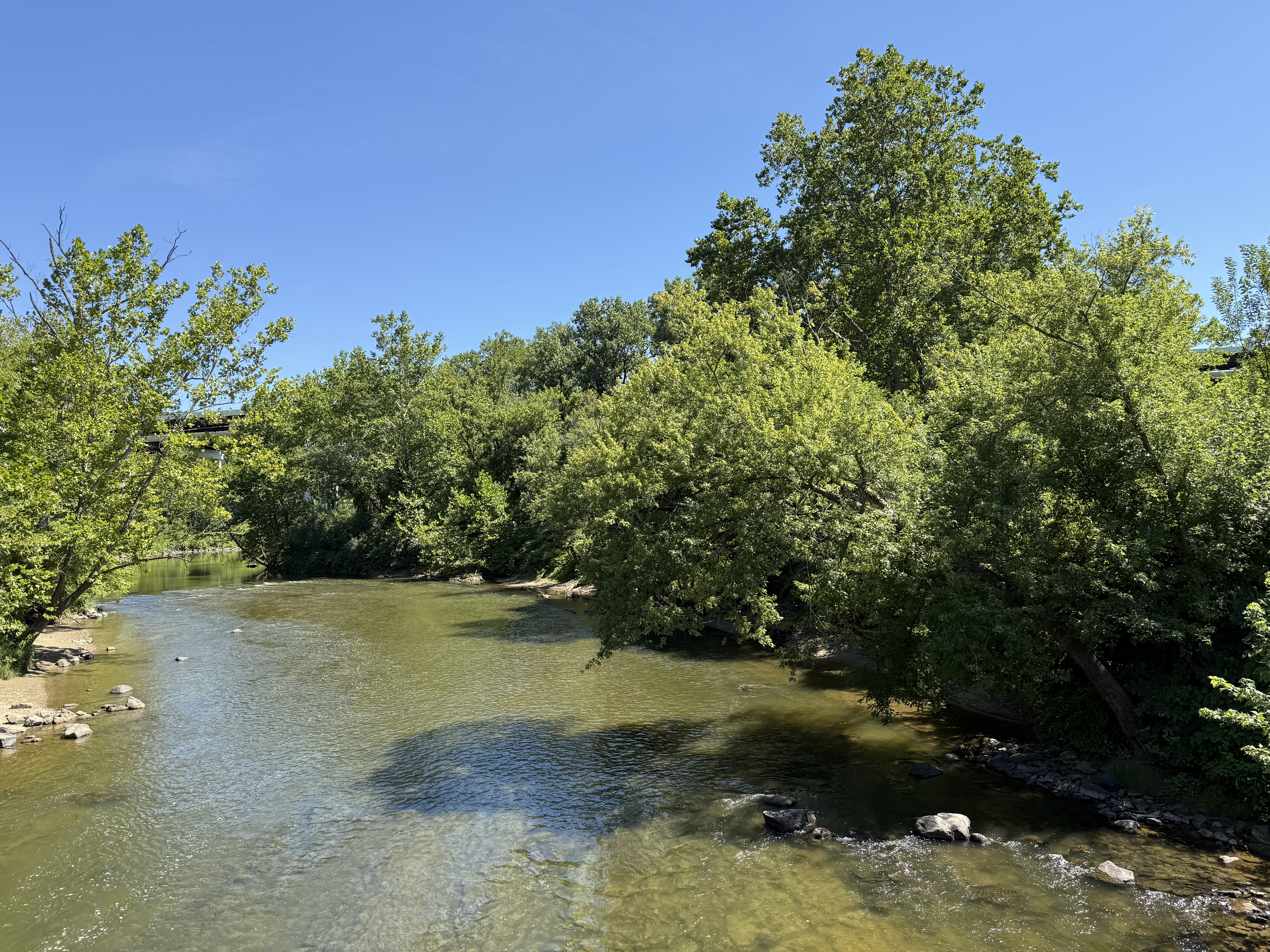
Cuyahoga River in Cuyahoga Valley National Park

The Cuyahoga watershed begins its 100-mile (160 km) journey in Hambden, Ohio, flowing southward to the confluence of the East Branch Cuyahoga River and West Branch Cuyahoga River in Burton, where the Cuyahoga River officially begins. It continues on its 84.9-mile (136.6 km) journey flowing southward to Akron and Cuyahoga Falls, where it turns sharply north and flows through the Cuyahoga Valley National Park in northern Summit County and southern Cuyahoga County. It then flows through Independence, Valley View, Cuyahoga Heights, Newburgh Heights and Cleveland to its northern terminus, emptying into Lake Erie. The Cuyahoga River and its tributaries drain 813 square miles (2,110 km^{2}) of land in portions of six counties.

The river is a relatively recent geologic formation, formed by the advance and retreat of ice sheets during the last ice age. The final glacial retreat, which occurred 10,000–12,000 years ago, caused changes in the drainage pattern near Akron. This change in pattern caused the originally south-flowing Cuyahoga to flow to the north. As its newly reversed currents flowed toward Lake Erie, the river carved its way around glacial debris left by the receding ice sheet, resulting in the river's winding U-shape. These meanderings stretched the length of the river (which was only 30 miles (50 km) when traveled directly) into a 100-mile (160 km) trek from its headwaters to its mouth. The depth of the river (except where noted below) ranges from 3 to 6 ft (1 to 2 m).

== History ==
The river was one of the features along which the "Greenville Treaty Line" ran beginning in 1795, per the Treaty of Greenville that ended the Northwest Indian War in the Ohio Country, effectively becoming the western boundary of the United States and remaining so briefly. On July 22, 1796, Moses Cleaveland, a surveyor charged with exploring the Connecticut Western Reserve, arrived at the mouth of the Cuyahoga and subsequently located a settlement there, which became the city of Cleveland.

=== Native Americans ===
It appears that, in more ancient times, the river was inhabited by some branch of Mound Building culture related to the Hopewell during the Woodland Period. This region included the Ohio Hopewell complex, living along the upper portion of the Cuyahoga River, and the adjacent Couture Complex on the west bank of the river and along the coast of Lake Erie; very little is known about the latter. The only mound formally excavated was Towner's Mound outside of Kent, which appears identical in construction to two other mounds excavated in North Benton, OH, and Warren, PA, that are related to the New York Hopewell offshoot. The Iroquois say that, when the Erie first moved into western Pennsylvania, they pushed out a mound building people, which may show a continuity of such people for a few hundred years after the Hopewell Culture collapsed. Many other suspected mounds are also known and several other suspected mounds have been destroyed by industry since the 1790s. The Hopewell Culture began to decline as early as the fourth century A.D. After an intermediate period, it was replaced by the Mississippian era Fort Ancient Culture in Ohio, whose extreme northeast included the upper Cuyahoga River.

When the French first began exploring and mapping the Great Lakes region in the 17th century, it comes across that the entire area of northern Ohio belonged to the Erie, but archaeology has since shown that the French, who only saw abandoned villages on the lake shore and never met any of the inhabitants, were mistaken. The entire Cuyahoga River Valley and last west of it actually belonged to a presumably Algonquian people never encountered by Europeans called the Whittlesey culture by scholars. They were destroyed during the Beaver Wars (1630–1701). Afterwards, the Iroquois stationed a group of captured Hurons in this areas, who later broke free after the French aided several Native groups from the Mississippi River in pushing the Iroquois all the way back to what is now Pittsburg, and established themselves as their own tribe - the Wyandot.

The Wyandot chose to set aside the entire region from the Cuyahoga River to the Pennsylvania border and the Mahoning River to Lake Erie as a communal hunting ground, to be enjoyed by all tribes in the region, causing it to be regularly frequented by themselves, the Lenape, Shawnee and Seneca. The Ottawa, who lived clear at the western end of Lake Erie and who, themselves, had formed out of a similar circumstance to the Wyandot- captured Anishinaabeg stationed in the vicinity of what is now Detroit by the Iroquois- were apparently allowed to establish communities in the area, given the tribe's distance from it, with one noted in what is now Conneaut and several others noted along the Cuyahoga. But, it is historically established that not all the villages along the Cuyahoga at this time were Ottawa, with a Seneca community noted around Streetsboro under a chief named Big John and possibly some Wyandots nearby.

During the Northwest Indian War (1785–1795), all the tribes in Ohio were ordered to give up most of Ohio for settlement, leading to a mass military revolt of all tribes in the Great Lakes region under a war chief named Little Turtle, with most of the fighting occurring along the Ohio-Indiana border. At this time, some Moravian missionaries who had been looking to establish a mission amongst the Ottawa were warned away due to the conflict, so they appear to have chosen to settle amongst the Ottawa in northeast Ohio at a site called Pilgeruh, but mistakenly noted all the villages in the area were Ottawa. After the war, the military ordered the Natives to evict the region, but most of them stayed during the early decades of settlement, with the last of the local natives concentrating in the Cuyahoga River Valley before leaving between 1811 and 1813. While there is a chance some may have gone to southern Ohio and joined Tecumseh's brother's pan-Indian cult at his Prophetstown compound, as the New Madrid Earthquake of 1811 was interpreted as a sign in his favor by many tribes across the eastern US, it appears the last of them in 1813 were leaving to migrate west, into the Great Black Swamp region – the last of Ohio's guaranteed Indian Territory – to live amongst the bulk of the Ottawa and Wyandot who were settled there.

=== Environmental cleanup ===
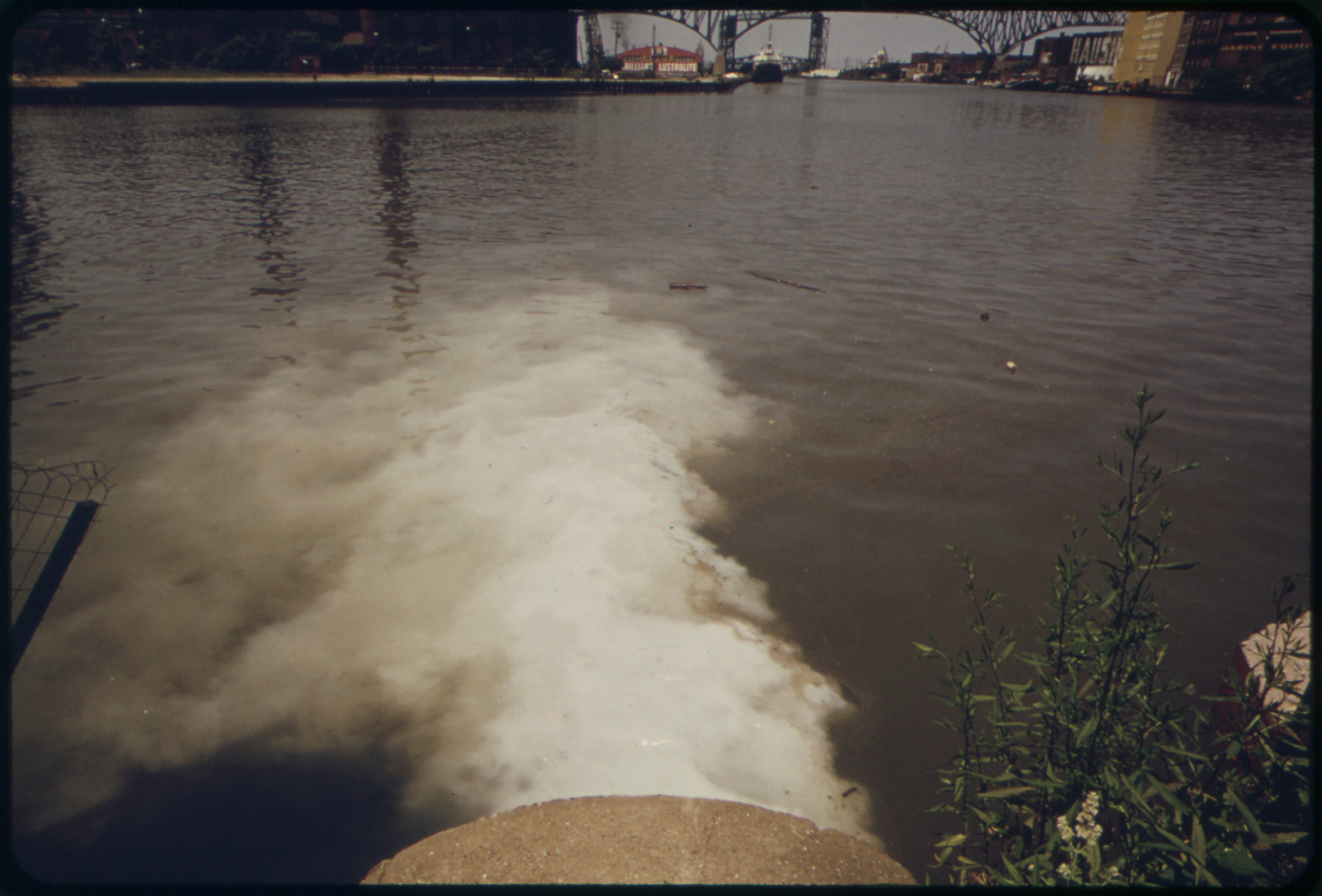
A city pump station discharges sewage into Cuyahoga River in 1973.

The Cuyahoga River, at times during the 20th century, was one of the most polluted rivers in the United States. The reach from Akron to Cleveland was devoid of fish. A 1968 Kent State University symposium described one section of the river:

From 1,000 feet [300 m] below Lower Harvard Bridge to Newburgh and South Shore Railroad Bridge, the channel becomes wider and deeper and the level is controlled by Lake Erie. Downstream of the railroad bridge to the harbor, the depth is held constant by dredging, and the width is maintained by piling along both banks. The surface is covered with the brown oily film observed upstream as far as the Southerly Plant effluent. In addition, large quantities of black heavy oil floating in slicks, sometimes several inches thick, are observed frequently. Debris and trash are commonly caught up in these slicks forming an unsightly floating mess. Anaerobic action is common as the dissolved oxygen is seldom above a fraction of a part per million. The discharge of cooling water increases the temperature by 10 to 15 °F [5.6 to 8.3 °C]. The velocity is negligible, and sludge accumulates on the bottom. Animal life does not exist. Only the algae Oscillatoria grows along the piers above the water line. The color changes from gray-brown to rusty brown as the river proceeds downstream. Transparency is less than 0.5 feet [0.15 m] in this reach. This entire reach is grossly polluted.

At least 13 fires have been reported on the Cuyahoga River, the first occurring in 1868. The largest river fire, in 1952, caused over $1 million in damage to boats, a bridge, and a riverfront office building.

Things began to change in the late 1960s, when new mayor Carl Stokes and his utilities director rallied voters to approve a $100 million bond to rehabilitate Cleveland's rivers. Then, the mayor seized the opportunity of a June 22, 1969, river fire triggered by a spark from a passing rail car igniting an oil slick to bring reporters to the river to raise attention to the issue. The 1969 fire caused approximately $50,000 in damage, mostly to an adjacent railroad bridge, but despite Mayor Stokes' efforts, very little attention was initially given to the incident, and it was not considered a major news story in the Cleveland media. Furthermore, what little was initially written about the incident did not emphasize the fire itself, but rather the damage to the railroad bridge.

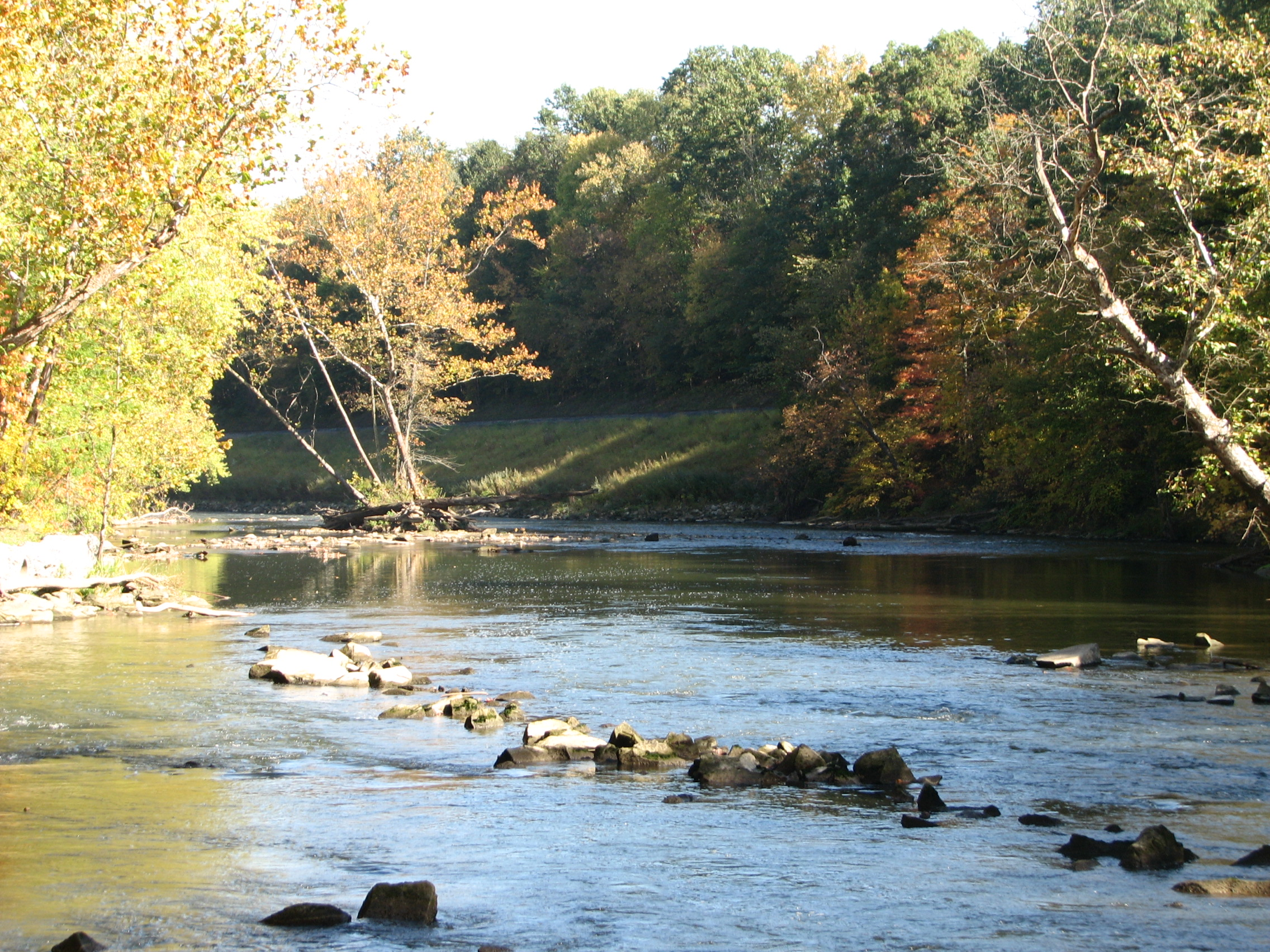
A view of the river from the Ohio and Erie Canal Tow-Path Trail

However, the incident did soon garner the attention of Time magazine, which used a dramatic photo of the even larger 1952 blaze in an article on the pollution of America's waterways. The article described the Cuyahoga as the river that "oozes rather than flows" and in which a person "does not drown but decays" and listed other badly-polluted rivers across the nation. (No pictures of the 1969 fire are known to exist, as local media did not arrive on the scene until after the fire was under control.) The article launched Time's new "Environment" section, and gained wide readership not only on its own merit, but because the same issue featured coverage of astronauts Neil Armstrong and Buzz Aldrin landing on the Moon the previous week in the Apollo 11 mission, and had Senator Ted Kennedy on the cover for a story on the Chappaquiddick incident in which Kennedy's automobile passenger, Mary Jo Kopechne, had drowned.

In 1969 the Cuyahoga River fire, along with the Santa Barbara oil spill earlier that year, helped spur an avalanche of water pollution control activities, resulting in amendments extending the Clean Water Act, Great Lakes Water Quality Agreement, and the creation of the federal Environmental Protection Agency (EPA) and the Ohio Environmental Protection Agency (OEPA). The Act followed some strict goals: eliminating discharge of all pollutants into navigable waters by 1985, making all water safe for fishing and swimming by 1983, and prohibiting all discharge of toxic amounts of toxic pollutants. The Clean Water Act avoided all agricultural pollution, one of the worst surface water quality problems at the time. Mayor Stokes gave Congressional testimony on his and other major big cities' struggles with polluting industries to restore the environmental health of their communities. As a result, large point sources of pollution on the Cuyahoga have received significant attention from the OEPA in subsequent decades. These events are referred to in Randy Newman's 1972 song Burn On from the album "Sail Away", R.E.M.'s 1986 song "Cuyahoga", and Adam Again's 1992 song "River on Fire". Great Lakes Brewing Company of Cleveland named its Burning River Pale Ale after the event. The Cuyahoga River fire also negatively impacted the greater American public view on highly industrialized areas; not only were personal connections to these places decreased in the past decades, but industrialized areas were now seen in connected to incidents like the Cuyahoga River fire. In December 1970, a federal grand jury investigation led by U.S. Attorney Robert Jones began, of water pollution allegedly being caused by about 12 companies in northeastern Ohio; it was the first grand jury investigation of water pollution in the area. The Attorney General of the United States, John N. Mitchell, gave a Press Conference December 18, 1970, referencing new pollution control litigation, with particular reference to work with the new Environmental Protection Agency, and announcing the filing of a lawsuit that morning against the Jones and Laughlin Steel Corporation for discharging substantial quantities of cyanide into the Cuyahoga River near Cleveland. U.S. Attorney Jones filed the misdemeanor charges in District Court, alleging violations of the 1899 Rivers and Harbors Act. There were multiple other suits filed by U.S. Attorney Jones.

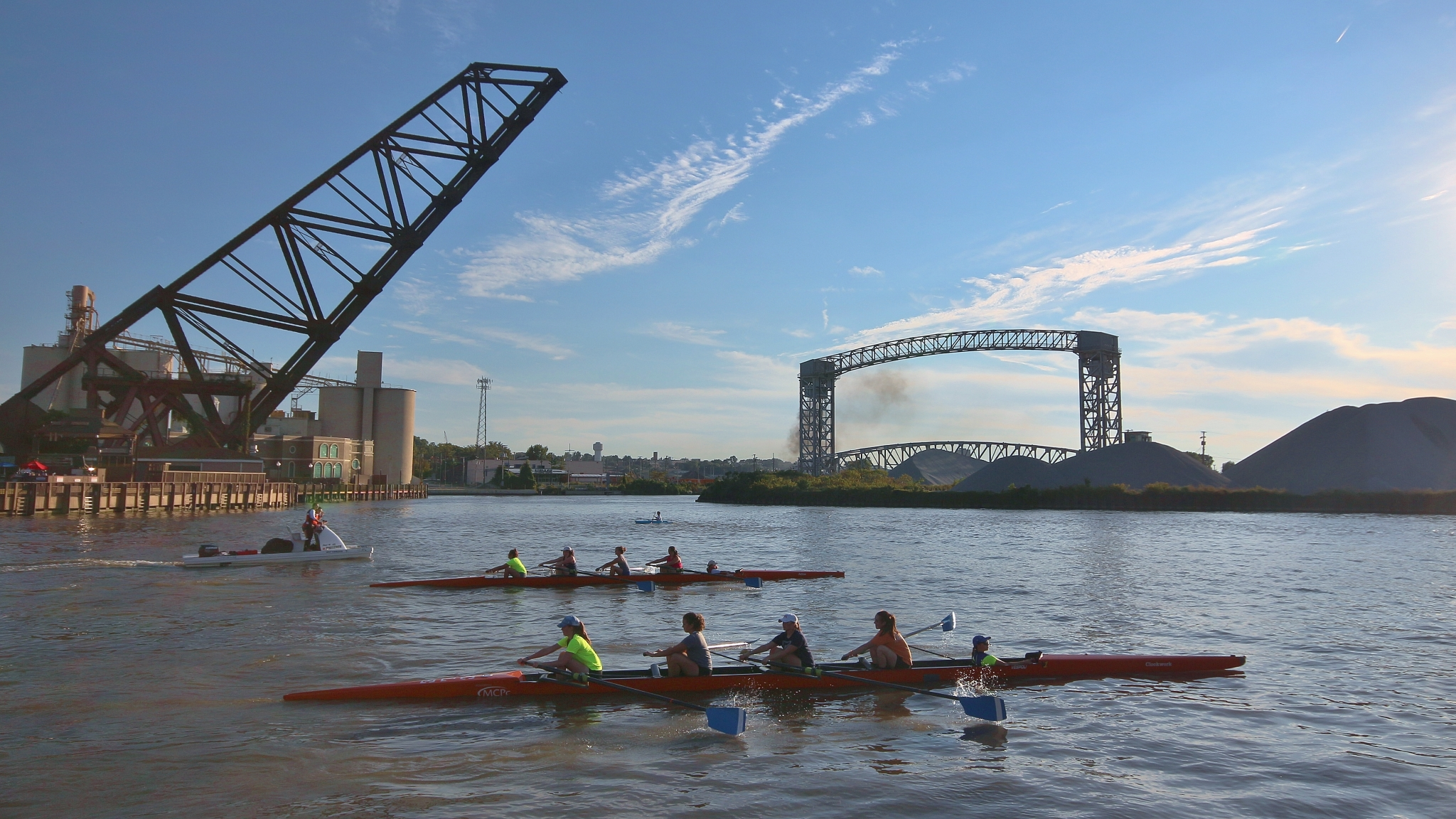
Rowing on the Cuyahoga in Cleveland

Water quality has improved and, partially in recognition of this improvement, the Cuyahoga was designated one of 14 American Heritage Rivers in 1998. Despite these efforts, pollution continues to exist in the Cuyahoga River due to other sources of pollution, including urban runoff, nonpoint source problems, combined sewer overflows, and stagnation due to water impounded by dams. For this reason, the Environmental Protection Agency classified portions of the Cuyahoga River watershed as one of 43 Great Lakes Areas of Concern. The most polluted portions of the river now generally meet established aquatic life water quality standards except near dam impoundments. The reasons for not meeting standards near the dam pools are habitat and fish passage issues rather than water quality. River reaches that were once devoid of fish now support 44 species. A survey in 2008 revealed the two most common species in the river were hogsuckers and spotfin shiners, both moderately sensitive to water quality. Habitat issues within the 5.6-mile (9.0 km) navigation channel still preclude a robust fishery in that reach. Recreation water quality standards (using bacteria as indicators) are generally met during dry weather conditions, but are often exceeded during significant rains due to nonpoint sources and combined sewer overflows. In March 2019, the OEPA declared fish caught in the river safe to eat. Consequently, in 2024, the first ever steelhead trout stocking in the river occurred.

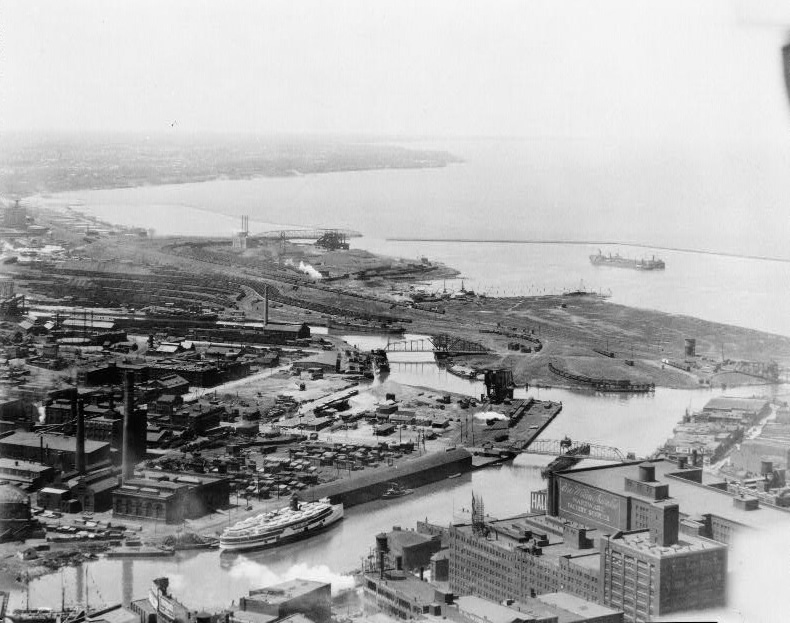
The river's mouth at Lake Erie in Cleveland, c. 1920

=== Modifications ===
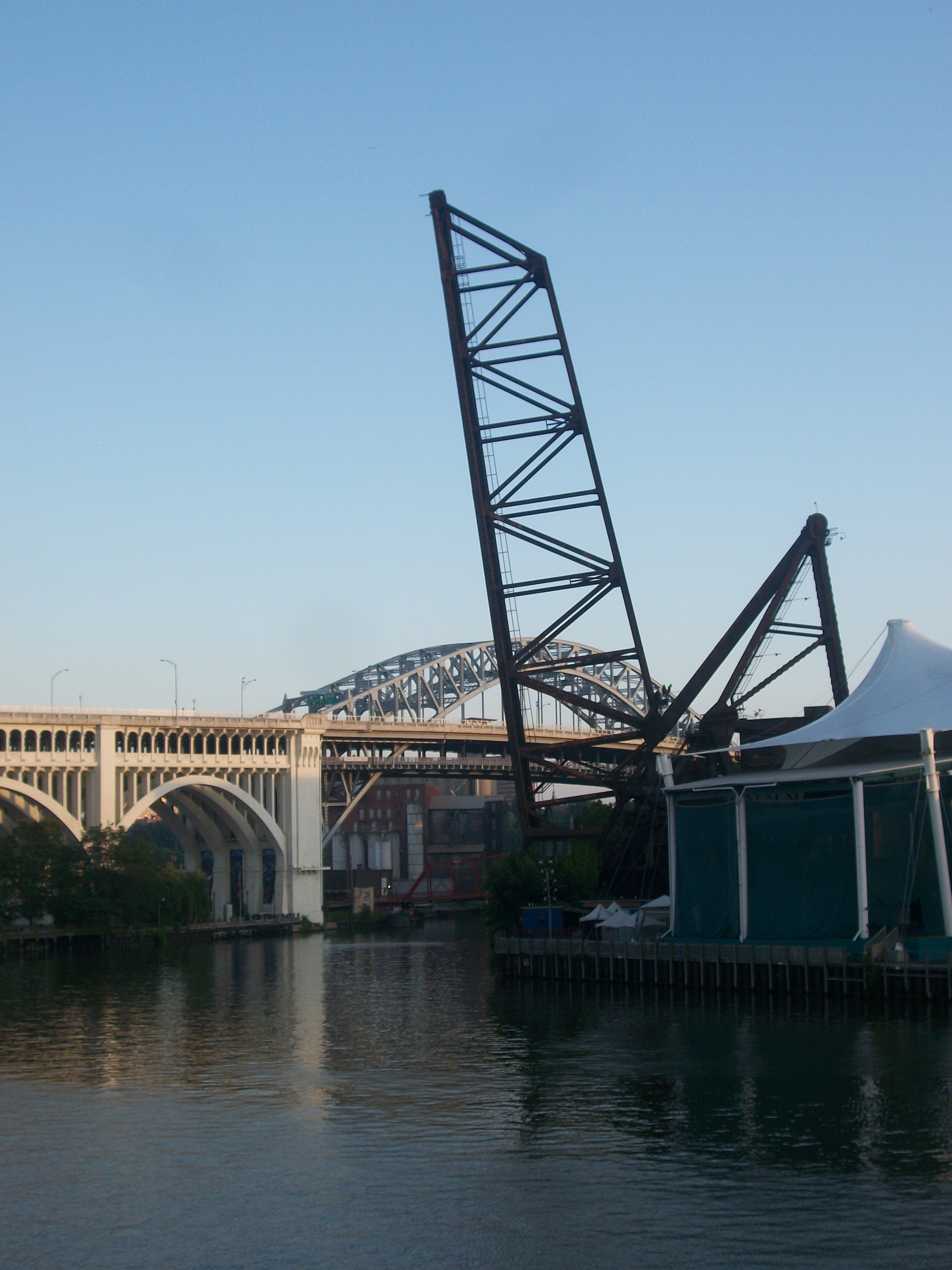
Near the mouth of the river in Cleveland's Flats

The lower Cuyahoga River, just west of present-day downtown Cleveland, has been subjected to numerous changes. Originally, the Cuyahoga river met Lake Erie approximately 4,000 feet (1.2 km) west of its current mouth, forming a shallow marsh. The current mouth is human-made, created in 1827, and allows shipping traffic to flow freely between the river and the lake. Additionally, the U.S. Army Corps of Engineers periodically dredges the navigation channel of the otherwise shallow river to a depth of 27 feet (8.2 m), along the river's lower 5 miles (8.0 km), from its mouth up to the Mittal Steel Cleveland Works steel mills, to accommodate Great Lakes freighter traffic which serves the bulk (asphalt, gravel, petroleum, salt, steel, and other) industries located along the lower Cuyahoga River banks in Cleveland's Flats district. The Corps of Engineers has also straightened river banks and widened turning basins in the federal navigation channel on the lower Cuyahoga River to facilitate maritime operations.

==== Ice-breaking ====
The United States Coast Guard sometimes conducts fall and spring ice-breaking operations along Lake Erie and the lower Cuyahoga River to prolong the Great Lakes shipping season, depending on shipping schedules and weather conditions.

==== Flooding ====
Some attempts (including dams and dredging) have been made to control flooding along the Cuyahoga River basin. As a result of speculative land development, buildings have been erected on many flat areas that are only a few feet above normal river levels. Sudden strong rain or snow storms can create severe flooding in these low-lying areas.

The upper Cuyahoga River, starting at 1,093 feet (333 m) over 84 miles (135 km) from its mouth, drops in elevation fairly steeply, creating falls and rapids in some places; the lower Cuyahoga River only drops several feet along the last several miles of the lower river to 571 feet (174 m) at the mouth on Lake Erie, resulting in relatively slow-moving waters that can take a while to drain compared to the upper Cuyahoga.

Elevation at confluence points
River Mile:	Elevation:	Tributary:
1,235 feet (0.376 km)	571 feet (174 m) Mouth: at Lake Erie
4.46 miles (7.18 km)	581 feet (177 m) Kingsbury Run (Cuyahoga River)
5.345 miles (8.602 km)	577 feet (176 m) Burk Branch (Cuyahoga River)
7.2 miles (11.6 km)	577 feet (176 m) Big Creek (Cuyahoga River)
11.12 miles (17.90 km)	591 feet (180 m) West Creek (Cuyahoga River)
11.4 miles (18.3 km)	587 feet (179 m) Mill Creek (Cuyahoga River)
16.36 miles (26.33 km)	610 feet (190 m) Tinkers Creek (Cuyahoga River)
18.08 miles (29.10 km)	from Willow Lake; downstream from Ohio and Erie Canal dam
20.88 miles (33.60 km)	627 feet (191 m) Chippewa Creek (Cuyahoga River)
24.16 miles (38.88 km)	636 feet (194 m) Brandywine Creek (Cuyahoga River)
25.72 miles (41.39 km)	646 feet (197 m) Stanford Run
28.98 miles (46.64 km)	676 feet (206 m) Boston Run (Cuyahoga River)
31.47 miles (50.65 km)	699 feet (213 m) Langes Run
33.08 miles (53.24 km)	709 feet (216 m) Furnace Run (Cuyahoga River)
37.16 miles (59.80 km)	728 feet (222 m) Yellow Creek (Cuyahoga River)
39.78 miles (64.02 km)	738 feet (225 m) Mud Brook (Cuyahoga River)
42.27 miles (68.03 km)	758 feet (231 m) Little Cuyahoga River
45.8 miles (73.7 km)	840 feet (260 m) Gorge Metropolitan Park Dam
52.1 miles (83.8 km)	1,004 feet (306 m) Fish Creek (Cuyahoga River)
53.7 miles (86.4 km)	1,010 feet (310 m) Plum Creek (Cuyahoga River)
56.8 miles (91.4 km)	1,027 feet (313 m) Breakneck Creek (Cuyahoga River)
57.97 miles (93.29 km)	1,063 feet (324 m) Lake Rockwell Dam
59.95 miles (96.48 km)	1,070 feet (330 m) Eckert Ditch (Cuyahoga River)
63.45 miles (102.11 km)	1,109 feet (338 m) Yoder Ditch
66.33 miles (106.75 km)	1,096 feet (334 m) Harper Ditch (Cuyahoga River)
68.98 miles (111.01 km)
71.63 miles (115.28 km)	No data
74.29 miles (119.56 km)
76.64 miles (123.34 km)	1,010 feet (310 m) Black Creek (Cuyahoga River)
79.15 miles (127.38 km)	1,093 feet (333 m) Sawyer Brook (Cuyahoga River)
83.29 miles (134.04 km)	1,122 feet (342 m) Bridge Creek (Cuyahoga River)
84.9 miles (136.6 km)	1,093 feet (333 m) Source: East and West Branch Cuyahoga River
Cuyahoga River-tributary confluence elevations by River miles

Some tributary elevations above are higher than the Cuyahoga River elevation, because of small waterfalls at or near their confluences; and distances are measured in "river miles" along the river's length from its mouth on Lake Erie.

=== Accidents ===
On August 25, 2020, a Holland Oil and Gas fuel tanker crashed on State Route 8 in Akron, killing one individual and causing a fire that leaked fuel into the southern section of the river. The fire was extinguished by the Akron Fire Department and the river section and surrounding area were promptly cleaned up. The fatal road crash marked the first and only river fire incident on the Cuyahoga since June 1969. However, as scholar Anne Jefferson notes:

There are some real, substantive differences between this small fire and the fires of 50+ years ago... 50+ years ago, there were many, many point sources & non-point sources of pollution that made the river itself flammable (in Cleveland, near the mouth), and all it took was a sufficient spark. The Cuyahoga burned more than once (13 times before today), and so did rivers in other industrial cities in the US... Both local grassroots and national efforts have led to dramatic improvements in water quality since then. The Cuyahoga River still has some issues, but flammability isn’t among them.

== Wildlife ==
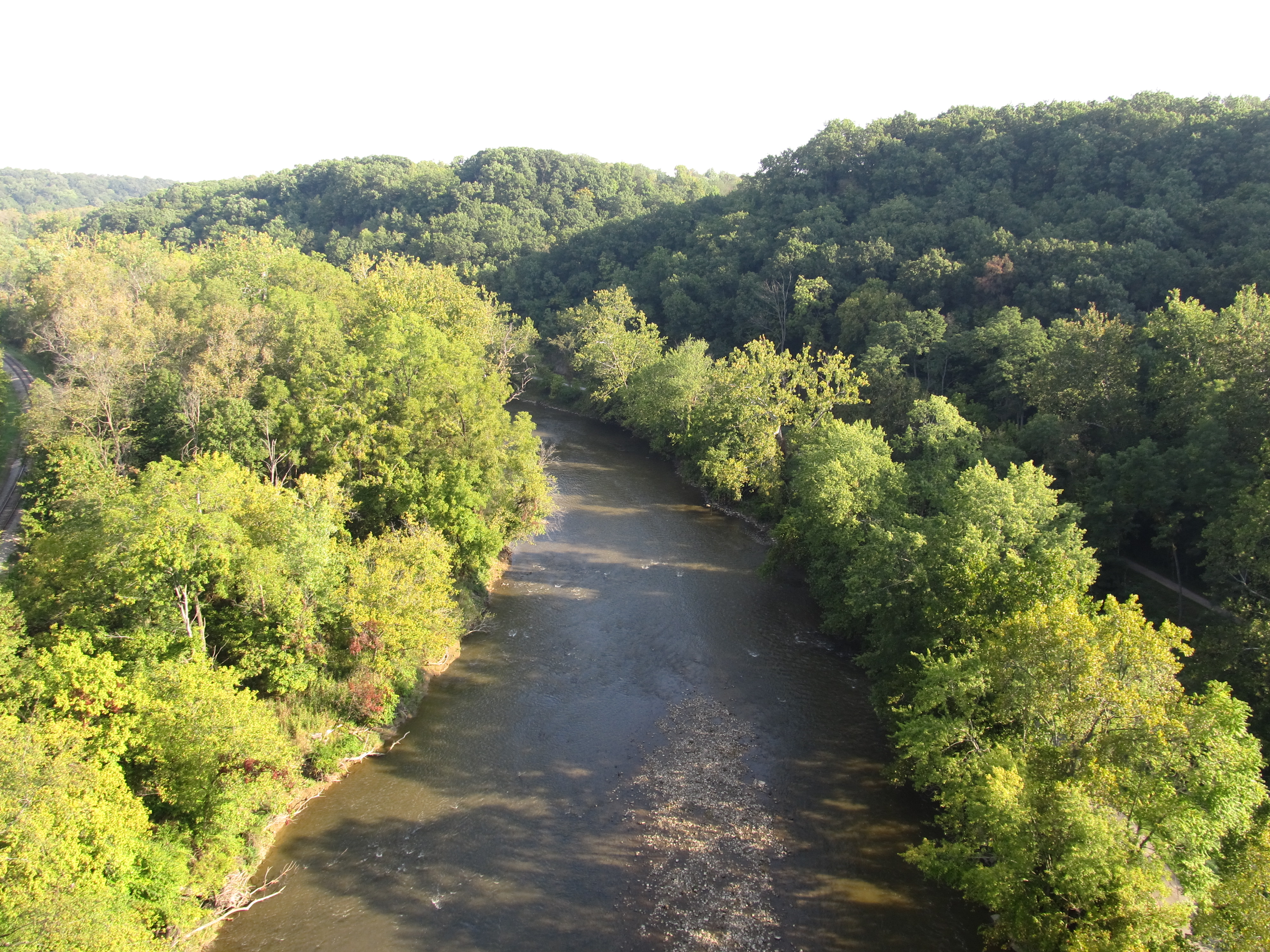
An elevated view of the Cuyahoga River at Cuyahoga Valley National Park

There are many mussel species found in the Cuyahoga River. One of these, the white heelsplitter (Lasmigonna complana) is not found in Lake Erie, unlike many other species of mussel, perhaps having been introduced through canals connecting the water systems around Lake Erie. The elktoe mussel (Alasmidonta marginata), an endangered species, is also found here, despite being threatened by the zebra mussel. The crayfish species Cambarus propinquus sanborni is also found in the Cuyahoga River system, as well as some of its oxbow lakes.

In 2021 the National Park Service, partnering with the U.S. Army Corps of Engineers, introduced various endangered mussel species and lake sturgeons into the Cuyahoga River in an effort to support their numbers, thus demonstrating considerable improvement with pollution levels.

Due to successful reintroduction measures and a lack of natural predators, there is a sizable white-tailed deer population at Cuyahoga Valley National Park. Due to conservation concerns, this deer population is regulated by the National Park Service in addition to local agencies. According to the National Park Service, other mammal species around the Cuyahoga River include coyote, gray fox, red fox, rodents (especially mice, squirrels, and chipmunks), shrews, moles, and numerous bat species. Semi-aquatic mammals include otter, mink, beaver, and muskrat.

The National Park Service states that a number of plant species around the Cuyahoga River are invasive, their presence due to human interaction with the local environment.

== Dams ==
=== Former Ohio and Erie Canal diversion dam ===
The Brecksville Dam (Note: The Ohio and Erie Canal diversion dam was located under the Brecksville-Northfield High Level Bridge over the Cuyahoga River valley.) at river mile 20 was the first dam upstream of Lake Erie. It affected fish populations by restricting their passage. The dam was removed in 2020.

=== Gorge Metropolitan Park Dam ===
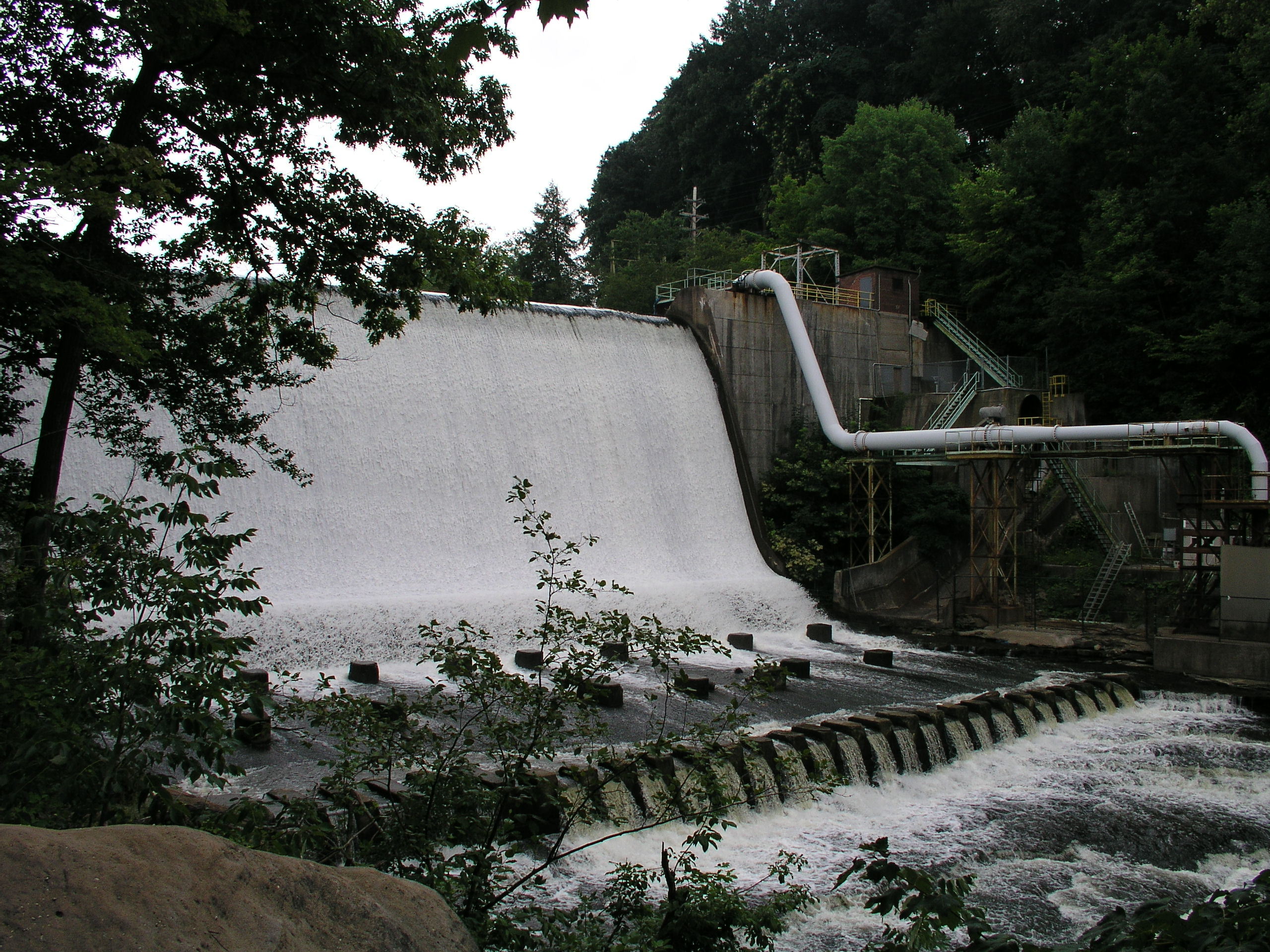
FirstEnergy Dam

The largest dam is the Gorge Metropolitan Park Dam, also known as the FirstEnergy Dam, on the border between Cuyahoga Falls and Akron. This 57-foot (17 m) dam has for over 90 years submerged the falls for which the city of Cuyahoga Falls was named; more to the point of water quality, it has created a large stagnant pool with low dissolved oxygen.

On April 9, 2019, officials from the U.S. EPA and Ohio EPA announced a plan to remove the Gorge Metropolitan Park Dam by 2023 at a cost of $65 to $70 million. Funding for the project was authorized through the Great Lakes Legacy Act with funds coming from the city of Akron and members of the Gorge Dam Stakeholder Committee, including Summit Metro Parks, FirstEnergy, and the city of Cuyahoga Falls. Funding for the project was secured in October 2023, and the decision was made to move forward with the removal project. As of 2024, removal of the dam is expected to take place in 2026.

The FirstEnergy Dam was built by the Northern Ohio Traction and Light Co. in 1912 to serve the dual functions of generating hydropower for its local streetcar system and providing cooling-water storage for a coal-burning power plant; however, the hydropower operation was discontinued in 1958, and the coal-burning plant was decommissioned in 1991. Some environmental groups and recreational groups want the dam removed. Others contend that such an effort would be expensive and complicated, for at least two reasons: first, the formerly hollow dam was filled in with concrete in the early 1990s, and second, because of the industrial history of Cuyahoga Falls, the sediment upstream of the dam is expected to contain hazardous chemicals, possibly including heavy metals and PCBs. The Ohio EPA estimated removal of the dam would cost $5–10 million, and removal of the contaminated sediments, a further $60 million. The dam is licensed through 2041.

=== Dams in Cuyahoga Falls ===
In late 2012, two dams in Cuyahoga Falls, the Sheraton and LeFever Dams, were scheduled for demolition, as the result of an agreement between the city of Cuyahoga Falls, which owns the dams, and the Northeast Ohio Regional Sewer District, which will provide $1 million of funding to remove the dams. On December 12, 2012, the ACOE issued a permit, allowing the demolition to proceed. As part of the project, a water trail was developed. In early June 2013, dam removal began, and ended on August 20, 2013. This brought about a mile of the river back to its natural state, removed 35 feet (11 m) of structures, and exposed an equivalent quantity of whitewater for recreation. In 2019, attempts by the city to address increased erosion as a result of the removal of these and other area dams were publicized.

=== Munroe Falls Dam ===
Two other dams, in Kent and in Munroe Falls, though smaller, have had an even greater impact on water quality due to the lower gradient in their respective reaches. For this reason, the Ohio EPA required the communities to mitigate the effects of the dams.

The Munroe Falls Dam was modified in 2005. Work on this project uncovered a natural waterfall. Given this new knowledge about the riverbed, some interested parties, including Summit County, campaigned for complete removal of the dam. The revised plan, initially denied on September 20, 2005, was approved by the Munroe Falls City Council a week later. The 11.5-foot (3.5 m) sandstone dam has since been removed, and in its place now is a natural ledge with a 4.5-foot (1.4 m) drop at its greatest point.

=== Kent Dam ===
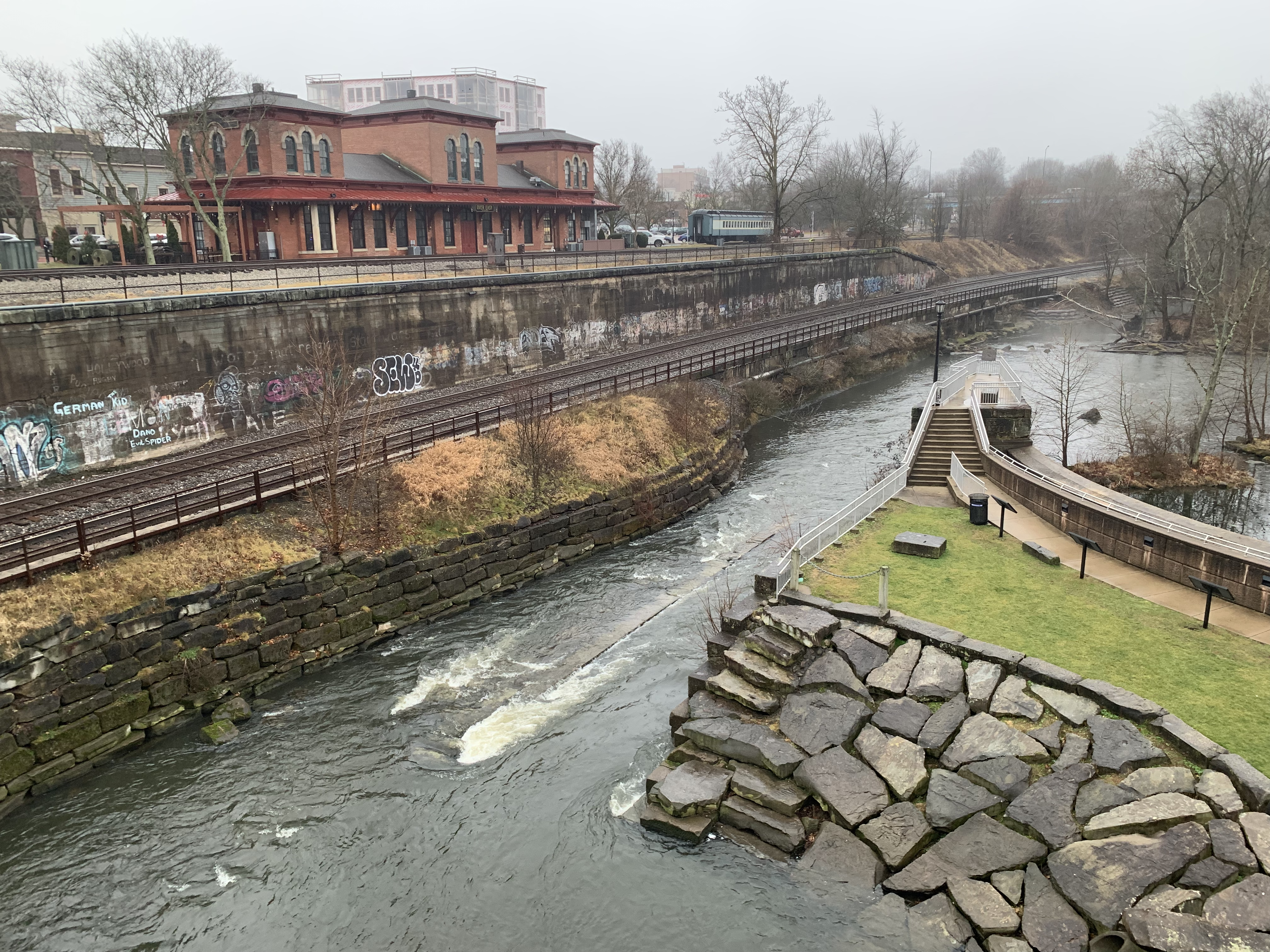
The Cuyahoga River in Kent, passing through the former canal lock

The Kent Dam was bypassed in 2004 and was the first dam modification project in the state of Ohio that was made solely for water quality issues. The modification resulted in the river fully attaining the designated Ohio water quality standards.

== Lists ==
=== Variant names ===
According to the United States Geological Survey Geographic Names Information System, the Cuyahoga River has also been known as:

- Cajahage River
- Cayagaga River
- Cayahoga River
- Cayhahoga River
- Cayohoga River
- Cujahaga River
- Cuyohaga River
- Gichawaga Creek
- Goyahague River
- Gwahago River
- River de Saguin
- Rivière Blanche
- Rivière à Seguin
- Saguin River
- Yashahia
- Cayahaga River
- Cayanhoga River
- Cayhoga River
- Coyahoga River
- Cuahoga River
- Guyahoga River
- Gwahoga River
- Kiahagoh River

The name "White River" has also been applied.

=== Dams ===
Dams on the Cuyahoga River
RM (Note: RM stands for "river mile" and refers to the method used by federal and state government agencies to identify locations along a water body. Mileage is defined as the lineal distance from the downstream terminus (i.e. mouth) and moving in an upstream direction.)	Coordinates	Elevation	Locality	County	Description
20.71	41°19′15″N 81°35′15″W				Ohio and Erie Canal diversion dam, built 1825–1827 upstream from SR 82 Chippewa Road-West Aurora Road bridge, downstream from Station Road-Bridle Trail bridge
45.8	41°07′23″N 81°29′50″W	840 feet (260 m)		Summit	Gorge Metropolitan Park Dam, built in 1912, upstream from SR 8 North Main Street-State Road bridge, downstream from SR 59 Front Street bridge
49.9	41°08′14″N 81°28′53″W	1,007 feet (307 m)	Cuyahoga Falls	Summit	Cuyahoga Falls Low Head Dam, upstream from Portage Trail bridge, downstream from SR 8/SR 59 bridge
54.8	41°9′12″N 81°21′35″W		Kent	Portage	Kent dam, upstream from SR 59/SR 43 Haymaker Parkway bridge, immediately downstream from West Main Street bridge
57.97	41°10′58″N 81°19′51″W	1,063 feet (324 m)	Franklin Township	Portage	Lake Rockwell Dam, upstream from Ravenna Road bridge, downstream from SR 14 Cleveland-East Liverpool Road bridge

=== Tributaries ===
Generally, rivers are larger than creeks, which are larger than brooks, which are larger than runs. Runs may be dry except during or after a rain, at which point they can flash flood and be torrential.

Default is standard order from mouth to upstream: (Note: In terms of "importance": Little Cuyahoga River and West Branch Cuyahoga River articles, then the other creeks going from mouth to upstream)

Tributaries on the Cuyahoga River
RM	Coordinates	Elevation	Tributary	Municipality	County	Description
	41°29′32″N 81°42′53″W	577 feet (176 m)	Old River (Cuyahoga River)	Cleveland	Cuyahoga	near Division Avenue/River Road
4.46	41°28′52″N 81°40′36″W	581 feet (177 m)	Kingsbury Run (Cuyahoga River)		Cuyahoga	near Independence Road and Rockefeller Avenue
5.05	41°28′10″N 81°40′10″W	581 feet (177 m)	Morgan Run (Cuyahoga River)		Cuyahoga	near Independence Road and Pershing Avenue
5.29–5.4	41°27′50″N 81°40′45″W	577 feet (176 m)	Burk Branch (Cuyahoga River)		Cuyahoga	near CW steel mill
7.2	41°26′45″N 81°41′9″W	577 feet (176 m)	Big Creek (Cuyahoga River)		Cuyahoga	near Jennings Road, Harvard Avenue and Valley Road
10.84–11.4	41°25′00″N 81°38′47″W	591 feet (180 m)	West Creek (Cuyahoga River)		Cuyahoga	near SR-17 Granger Road, Valley Belt Road, and I-77
11.4	41°24′57″N 81°38′22″W	587 feet (179 m)	Mill Creek (Cuyahoga River)		Cuyahoga	near Canal Road and Warner Road
16.36	41°21′54″N 81°36′35″W	610 feet (190 m)	Tinkers Creek (Cuyahoga River)		Cuyahoga, Summit and Portage	near Canal Road and Tinkers Creek Road
18.08		0 feet (0 m)	from Willow Lake			
20.88	41°19′7″N 81°35′13″W	627 feet (191 m)	Chippewa Creek (Cuyahoga River)		Cuyahoga and Summit	near Chippewa Creek Drive and Riverview Road
24.16	41°17′10″N 81°33′50″W	636 feet (194 m)	Brandywine Creek (Cuyahoga River)		Summit	near Highland Road
25.72	41°16′25″N 81°33′51″W	646 feet (197 m)	Stanford Run		Summit	near Stanford Road
	41°15′42″N 81°33′29″W	650 feet (200 m)	Grannys Run (Cuyahoga River)		Summit	near Boston Mills Road and Riverview Road
28.79	41°14′35″N 81°33′13″W	689 feet (210 m)	Slipper Run		Summit	near SR-303 Main Street/West Streetsboro Road and Riverview Road
28.98	41°14′34″N 81°32′59″W	676 feet (206 m)	Boston Run (Cuyahoga River)		Summit	near East Mill Street and West Mill Street
29.24			Peninsula Creek		Summit	
29.82	41°13′58″N 81°32′57″W	689 feet (210 m)	Haskell Run		Summit	near Akron-Peninsula Road
30.26	41°13′42″N 81°32′59″W	692 feet (211 m)	Salt Run (Cuyahoga River)		Summit	near Akron-Peninsula Road and Truxell Road
30.66	41°13′34″N 81°33′6″W	699 feet (213 m)	Dickerson Run (Cuyahoga River)		Summit	near
31.47	41°13′3″N 81°33′35″W	699 feet (213 m)	Langes Run		Summit	
32.3	41°12′30″N 81°33′46″W	709 feet (216 m)	Robinson Run (Cuyahoga River)		Summit	
33.08	41°12′10″N 81°34′11″W	709 feet (216 m)	Furnace Run (Cuyahoga River)		Summit and Cuyahoga	
37.16	41°9′47″N 81°34′25″W	728 feet (222 m)	Yellow Creek (Cuyahoga River)		Summit and Medina	
37.26	41°9′42″N 81°34′25″W	728 feet (222 m)	Woodward Creek (Cuyahoga River)		Summit	
39.12	41°8′24″N 81°33′37″W	738 feet (225 m)	Sand Run (Cuyahoga River)		Summit	
39.78	41°8′17″N 81°33′5″W	738 feet (225 m)	Mud Brook (Cuyahoga River)		Summit	
42.27	41°7′9″N 81°31′45″W	758 feet (231 m)	Little Cuyahoga River		Summit	
52.1	41°8′26″N 81°23′56″W	1,004 feet (306 m)	Fish Creek (Cuyahoga River)	Stow	Summit and Portage	near North River Road between Marsh Road and Verner Road
53.7	41°8′32″N 81°22′24″W	1,010 feet (310 m)	Plum Creek (Cuyahoga River)	Kent	Portage	near Cherry Street and Mogadore Road
56.8	41°10′13″N 81°20′17″W	1,027 feet (313 m)	Breakneck Creek (Cuyahoga River)	Kent/Franklin Township border	Portage	near River Bend Boulevard and Beechwold Drive
57.6-57.97			Twin Lakes Outlet			
59.95	41°11′19″N 81°16′40″W	1,070 feet (330 m)	Eckert Ditch (Cuyahoga River)		Portage	
63.45	41°14′9″N 81°18′46″W	1,109 feet (338 m)	Yoder Ditch		Portage	
65.19			Bollingbrook, Portage			
66.33	41°14′31″N 81°15′36″W	1,096 feet (334 m)	Harper Ditch (Cuyahoga River)		Portage	
76.64	41°16′55″N 81°8′31″W	1,010 feet (310 m)	Black Creek (Cuyahoga River)		Portage	near SR-700 Welshfield Limaville Road between SR-254 Pioneer Trail and CR-224 Hankee Road
79.15	41°22′35″N 81°9′4″W	1,093 feet (333 m)	Sawyer Brook (Cuyahoga River)		Geauga	near Main Market Road US-422 and Claridon Troy Road
83.29	41°22′30″N 81°12′13″W	1,122 feet (342 m)	Bridge Creek (Cuyahoga River)		Geauga	
84.9	41°26′25″N 81°9′6″W	1,093 feet (333 m)	West Branch Cuyahoga River		Geauga	
84.9	41°26′25″N 81°9′5″W	1,093 feet (333 m)	East Branch Cuyahoga River		Geauga	

== See also ==
- List of crossings of the Cuyahoga River
- List of rivers of Ohio
