= Sand Run (Cuyahoga River tributary) =

Coordinates: 41°08′24″N 81°33′37″W

Sand Run is a stream located entirely within Summit County, Ohio. It is a tributary of the Cuyahoga River.

Sand Run was named for the sandstone outcroppings in the area.

== See also ==
- List of rivers of Ohio
