= Alasmidonta mccordi =

Conservation status
- Extinct (IUCN 3.1)

- Presumed Extinct (NatureServe)

Scientific classification
- Kingdom: Animalia
- Phylum: Mollusca
- Class: Bivalvia
- Order: Unionida
- Family: Unionidae
- Genus: Alasmidonta
- Species: †A. mccordi

Binomial name
- †Alasmidonta mccordi Athearn, 1964

Species of bivalve

Alasmidonta mccordi, the Coosa elktoe, was a species of freshwater mussel, an aquatic bivalve mollusk in the family Unionidae, the river mussels. Because no individuals have been seen recently, it is assumed to be extinct.

This species was endemic to the Coosa River, and was only known from a specimen collected in St. Clair County, Alabama in shallow, swift water. No specimens have been found since the construction of impoundments on the river.
