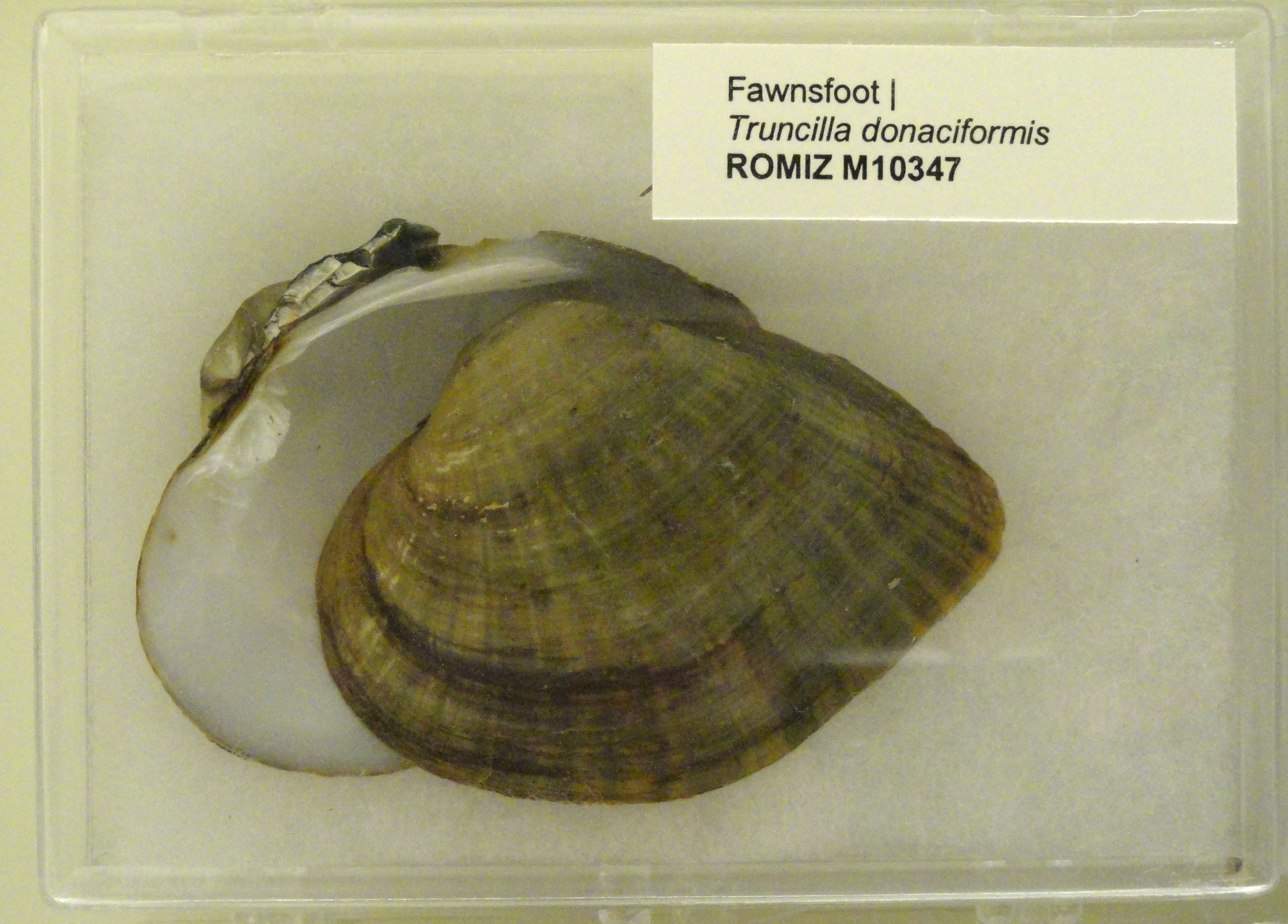

Conservation status
- Least Concern (IUCN 3.1)

- Secure (NatureServe)

Scientific classification
- Kingdom: Animalia
- Phylum: Mollusca
- Class: Bivalvia
- Order: Unionida
- Family: Unionidae
- Genus: Truncilla
- Species: T. donaciformis

Binomial name
- Truncilla donaciformis I. Lea, 1828

= Truncilla donaciformis =

Species of bivalve

Truncilla donaciformis, the fawnsfoot, is a species of freshwater mussel, an aquatic bivalve mollusk in the family Unionidae.

This species occurs in the Mississippi River drainage, Great Lakes region, Mobile basin, and Gulf Coast region in the United States, from South Dakota to Pennsylvania, south to Georgia and west to Texas as well as in southern Ontario, Canada.
