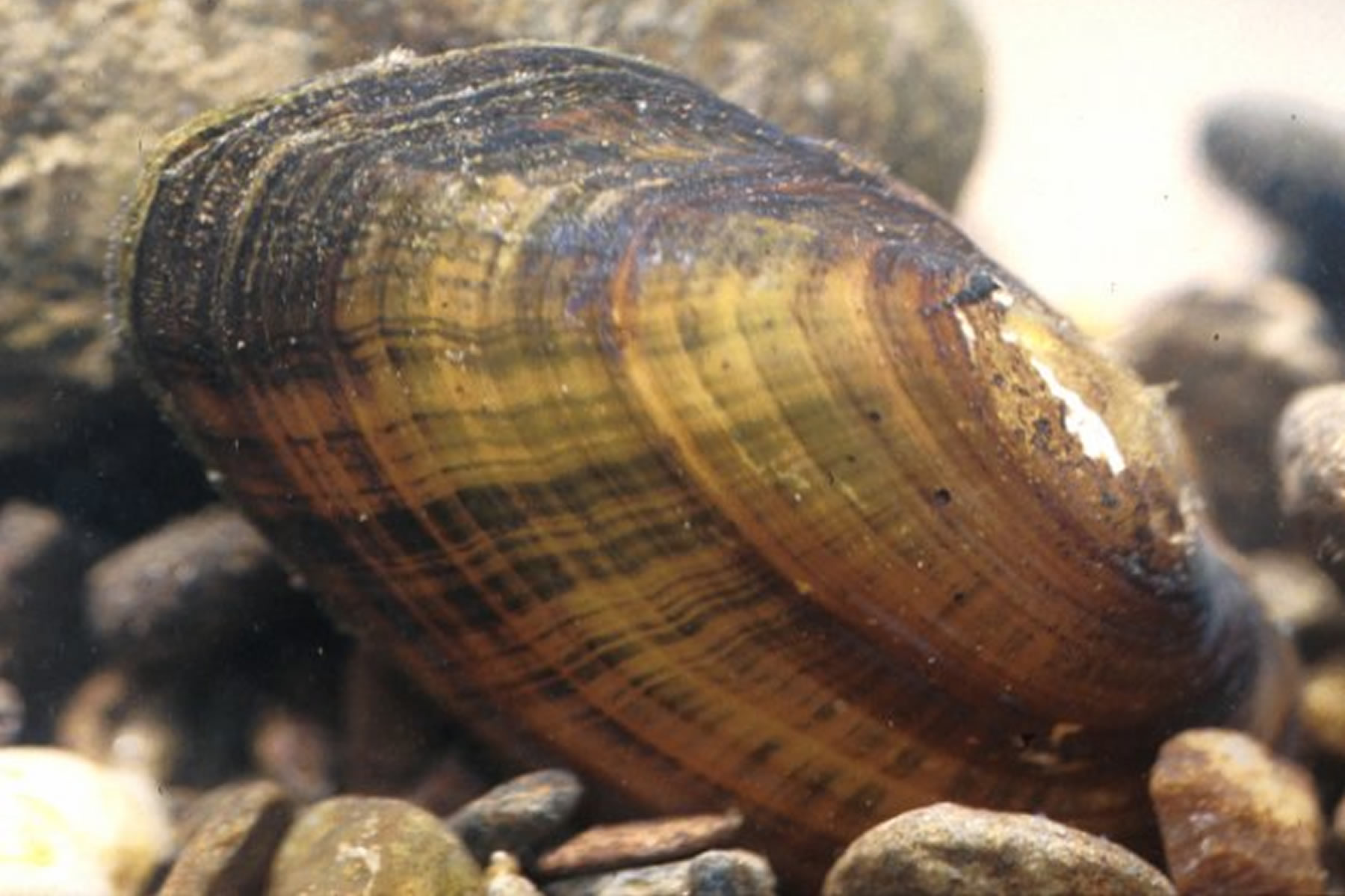
- Alasmidonta raveneliana

Scientific classification
- Kingdom: Animalia
- Phylum: Mollusca
- Class: Bivalvia
- Order: Unionida
- Family: Unionidae
- Tribe: Anodontini
- Genus: Alasmidonta; Say, 1818

= Alasmidonta =

Genus of bivalves

Alasmidonta is a genus of freshwater mussels, aquatic bivalve mollusks in the family Unionidae, the river mussels.

== Species within the genus Alasmodonta ==
- Altamaha arcmussel, Alasmidonta arcula (I. Lea, 1838)
- Cumberland elktoe, Alasmidonta atropurpurea (Rafinesque, 1831)
- Dwarf wedgemussel, Alasmidonta heterodon (I. Lea, 1830)
- Elktoe, Alasmidonta marginata Say, 1818
- Coosa elktoe, Alasmidonta mccordi Athearn, 1964
- Appalachian elktoe, Alasmidonta raveneliana (I. Lea, 1834)
- Carolina elktoe, Alasmidonta robusta Clarke, 1981
- Southern elktoe, Alasmidonta triangulata (I. Lea, 1858)
- Triangle floater, Alasmidonta undulata (Say, 1817)
- Brook floater, Alasmidonta varicosa (Lamarck, 1819)
- Slippershell mussel, Alasmidonta viridis (Rafinesque, 1820)
- Ochlockonee arcmussel, Alasmidonta wrightiana (Walker, 1901)

== Gallery ==
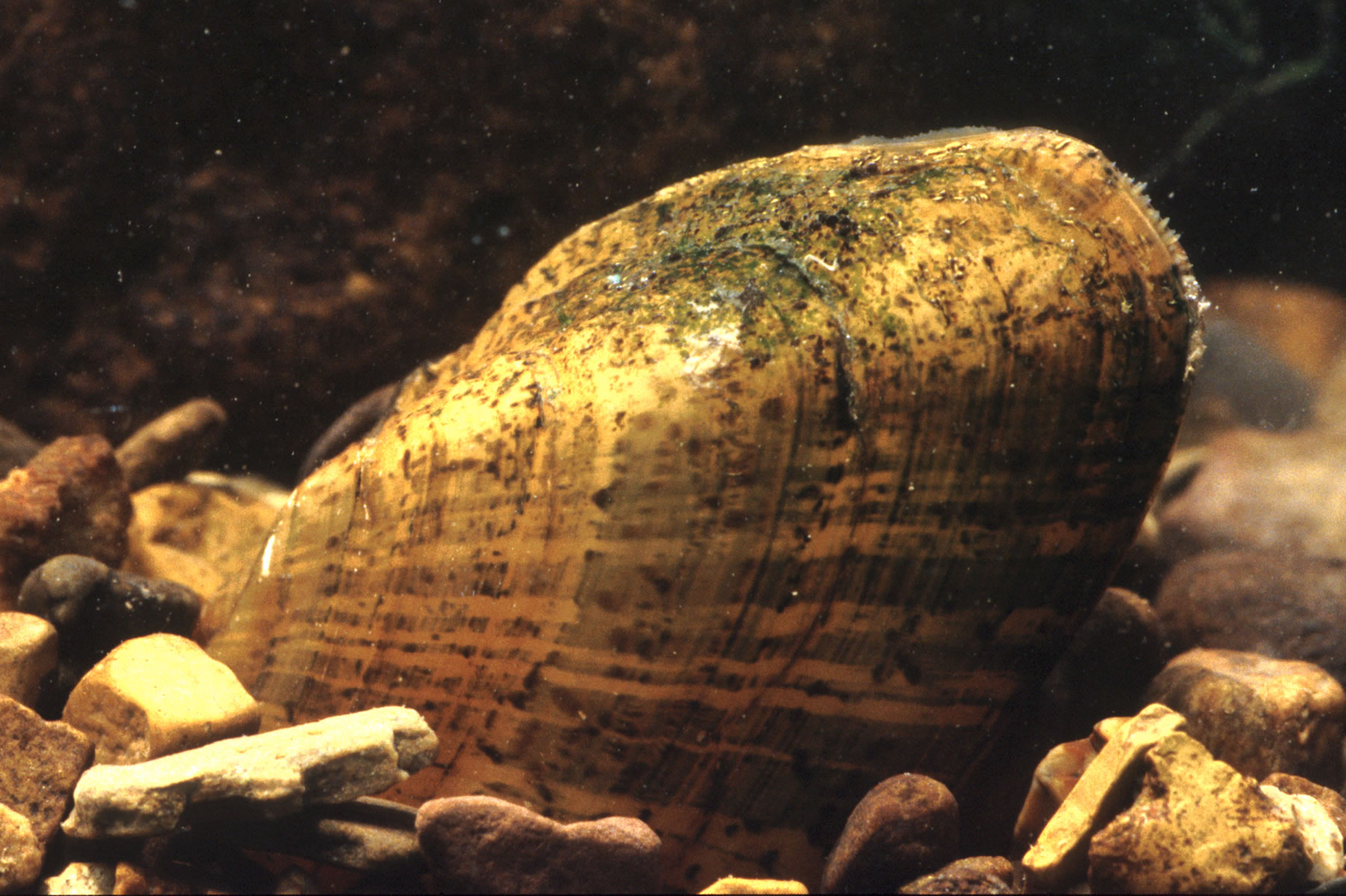
Elktoe,
Alasmidonta marginata

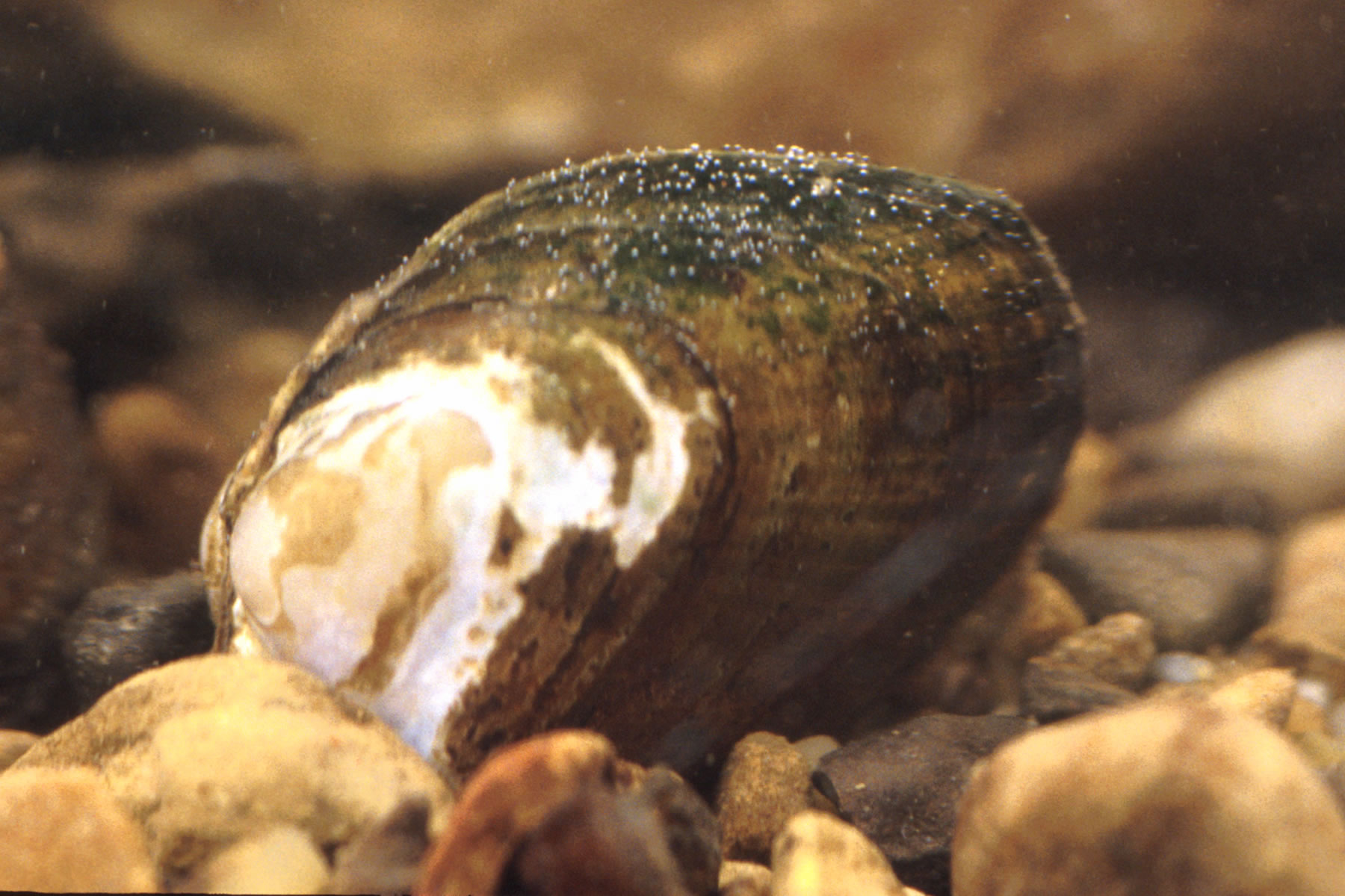
Slippershell mussel,
Alasmidonta viridis
