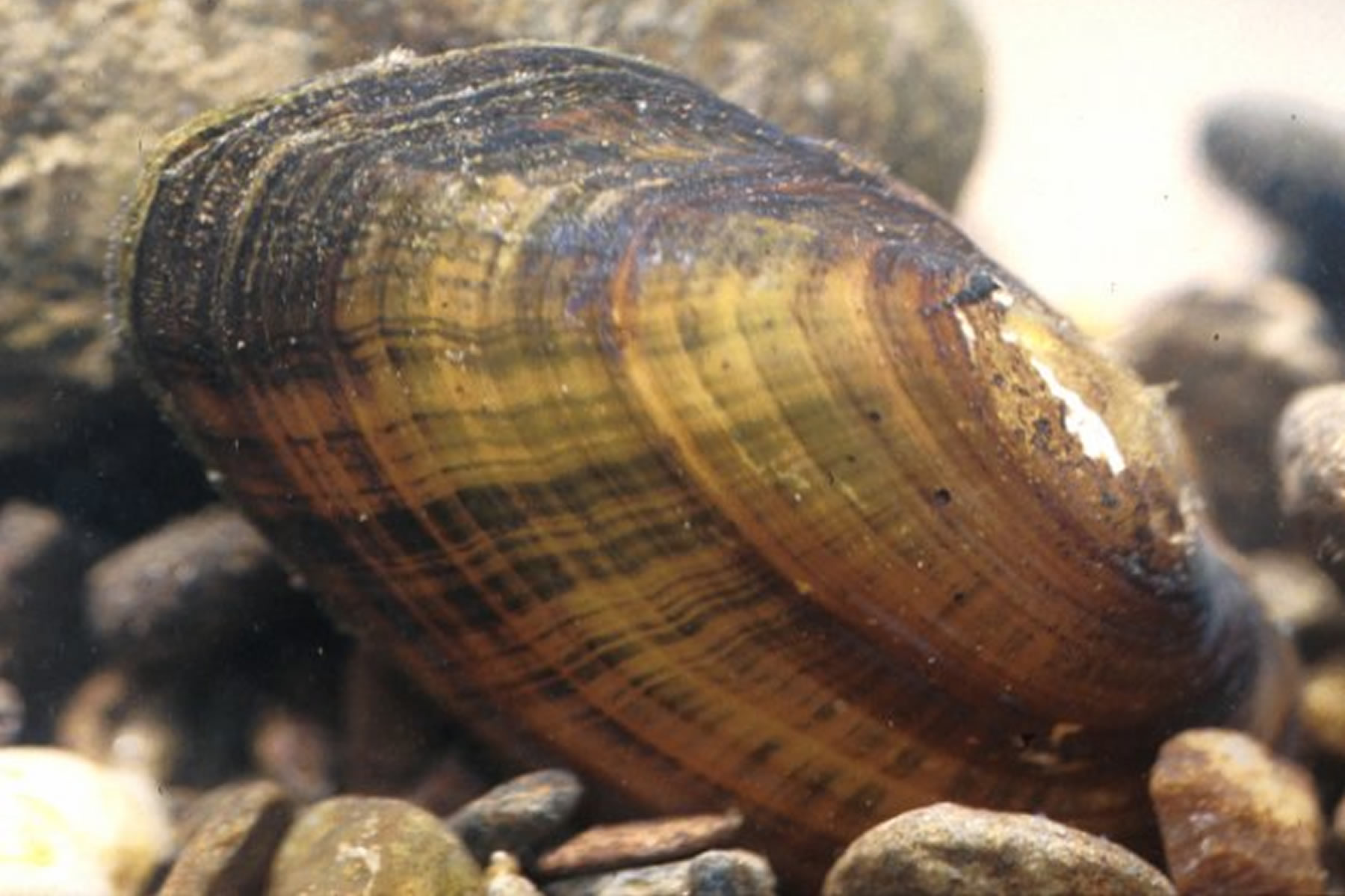

Conservation status
- Critically Endangered (IUCN 3.1)

- Critically Imperiled (NatureServe)

Scientific classification
- Kingdom: Animalia
- Phylum: Mollusca
- Class: Bivalvia
- Order: Unionida
- Family: Unionidae
- Genus: Alasmidonta
- Species: A. raveneliana

Binomial name
- Alasmidonta raveneliana (I. Lea, 1834)

Synonyms
- Margaritana raveneliana Lea, 1834; Unio swananoensis Hanley, 1843

= Appalachian elktoe =

Species of bivalve

The Appalachian elktoe (Alasmidonta raveneliana) is a species of freshwater mussel in the family Unionidae, the river mussels. It is native to the United States, where it is known only from North Carolina and Tennessee.

== Description ==
The Appalachian elktoe has a "thin, kidney-shaped shell, reaching up to about 10 centimeters (4 inches)."

Younger mussels normally have a yellowish-brown periostracum (outer shell layer), while more mature mussels generally have a dark brown to greenish-brown periostracum.

Features on the outer shell of the mussel, whether juvenile or adult, are often fine or hard to distinguish. In some cases streaks or waves are apparent, which are most easily noticeable on the dorsal region of the outer shell. Most individuals however have green waves, which are a similar hue as the rest of the shell and are often minute.

Inside the shell, the nacre has a sheen which is white, blue, and silver. The center of the inner shell changes from a light, almost translucent shine, to a more pink or tan color. Some species have irregular spots or blotches in the center of the nacre that are much darker than the rest of the lining of the shell.

== Habitat ==
Despite the rarity of the species, and the lack of information about the Appalachian elktoe, their habitat is very easily described because of the similarity to that of other species of freshwater mussels.

Alasmidonta raveneliana is found mostly in shallow to medium-sized creeks or rivers. They prefer cooler temperature water with fast-flowing to moderately-flowing currents. They are found near sections of the water where there is more rock or gravel at the bottom, as opposed to water that flows over areas with clay or silt on the bottom. (Appalachian elktoe mussels do not survive well in areas of streams where there are clay or silt particles moving in the water current.)

The species has been found in areas with varying sizes of rock such as sand, gravel, and boulders, and ideally prefers an area that has a combination of all three.

Appalachian elktoe need stability in order to survive, so they are not found in any areas where there is shifting gravel or rocks which can threaten the survival of the mussels.

== Life cycle ==
Many aspects of the life cycle of the Appalachian Elktoe are still unknown. The species is hard to find, and populations are decreasing. Currently, it is not known what the Appalachian Elktoe feed on, what fish they use as host fish, or how long their life span is. It is however a very sensitive species, and this makes it difficult to study.

Like other mollusks, the Appalachian elktoe feeds itself by picking out particles of food that are in the water. The specifics of their diet has yet to be determined, but it has been assumed that the Appalachian Elktoe survives off the same things as other freshwater mussels: detritus, diatoms, phytoplankton, and zooplankton (Churchill and Lewis, 1921).

The reproductive cycle of the Appalachian elktoe is also similar to other native freshwater mussels. First, the male releases a trail of sperm into the water column. Then, when females come in contact with the sperm, they take it in through their siphons. Normally this process occurs during either respiration or feeding. Once the females have taken the sperm in, they retain it in their gills until the larvae (glochidia) have matured and are fully developed. After the larvae are ready, they are then released from the female's gills into the water. Shortly thereafter, the baby mussels will find a host fish to live off for a period of time. When the mussels have grown into juveniles, they will then detach themselves from the host fish, and continue maturation on their own.

This stage of the mussels' life-cycle is one that not all mussels go through. In order for the mussels to survive the separation from the host fish, they need to detach themselves in a suitable area. Only one species of fish has been identified as a host fish for the Appalachian Elktoe: the Banded Sculpin or Cottus carolinae.

== Distribution ==
The Appalachian elktoe is endemic to mountain river streams in western North Carolina and eastern Tennessee.

Although historical information is unavailable, it is believed that the species once lived in a much larger area in the bigger creeks and streams of the upper Tennessee River systems.

Currently, the Appalachian elktoe has very fragmented populations: the mussels survive in scattered sections of suitable habitat in portions of the Little Tennessee River system, the Pigeon River system, the Little River in North Carolina and the Nolichucky River system in North Carolina and Tennessee.

In the Little Tennessee River system in North Carolina, populations survive in the reach of the main stem of the Little Tennessee River, between the city of Franklin and Fontana Reservoir, in Swain and Macon counties (Service 1994, 1996; McGrath 1999; Fridell, pers. observation, 2002), and in scattered reaches of the main stem of the Tuckasegee River in Jackson and Swain counties, from below the town of Cullowhee downstream to Bryson City (M. Cantrell, Service, pers. comm. 1996; Fridell, pers. observation 1996, 1997; McGrath 1998; T. Savidge, North Carolina Department of Transportation (NCDOT), pers. comm. 2001).

The populations in each of these rivers are very small, ranging from two live mussels to fifteen. Normally however, averages of only two to four mussels are found together at the same site of these river systems. The species continues to be very spread out wherever it survives. This can make it difficult to find Appalachian elktoe in their habitat, especially when there are only two or three mussels per site.

Historically, the geographic range of the species was broader and ranged from Tulula Creek to the main stems of the French Broad River and the Swannanoa River, but the Appalachian elktoe have not been spotted in these bodies of water recently, and it has been assumed that they no longer inhabit the areas.

It has also been documented that the species used to live in the North Fork Holston River in Tennessee. Later studies at that site proved that a similar species of mussel was found in the area, but not the Appalachian elktoe itself. It is still somewhat of a mystery as to whether the species actually did at one time live in the North Fork Holston River, but even so, the species will not be found in that area today.

As of 1996, only two populations of Appalachian elktoe were known to be surviving. One of the populations was found in the main stem of the Little Tennessee River, and the other was found scattered about in the main stem of the Nolichucky River in various counties of North Carolina.

== Conservation status ==
The Appalachian elktoe was listed "endangered" under the authority of the Endangered Species Act effective December 23, 1994. The exact cause for the decline of the species is unknown. Many factors have been blamed for the endangerment, including siltation from logging, mining, common agricultural practices, and also area construction work. Runoff into the river systems can seriously affect the species' survival, since the mussels only live in clean, well-oxygenated streams. The runoff and discharge of pollutants from industrial, agricultural, and municipal sources can cause major damage to the sensitive species. Human alterations of the species' habitat, such as dredging, damming, and other forms of channel manipulation, also have been considered responsible for declining populations. Changing aquatic environments without proper sedimentation control does not only negatively affect river mussels, but most other freshwater species as well.

Mussels are somewhat stationary; they are unable to move long distances, which is why they live in very specific, stable habitats that fulfill all of their needs. Their immobility hinders their survival, because they are unable to adapt to constantly changing aquatic environments. When their habitat is constantly being tampered with, they are unable to fully develop and reproduce.

The species was first noticed to be declining in populations some time after Hurricane Frances and Hurricane Ivan hit the Southeastern region of the United States in the early 1990s. Although the landscape was changed due to the high winds and heavy rain of the hurricanes, naturally occurring storms do not threaten the Appalachian elktoe. When humans tamper with the naturally occurring state of the streams however, it is very difficult for the Appalachian elktoe, as well as other mussel species, to remain healthy.

Siltation in the rivers is one of the biggest threats to freshwater mussels. Naturally occurring siltation usually does not bother the species, because it is on a much smaller scale. Siltation caused by human interaction both directly and indirectly affects mussels: it causes the natural patterns of the rivers to change. It can also create mounds on the bottom of the streams, which not only cover the rocks that mussels prefer to live next to, but also creates areas in the water that are difficult for the mussels' host fish to swim in, causing serious species fragmentation.

Siltation also degrades the quality of the water and exposes mussels to many more pollutants than they would naturally be exposed to. A study done in 1936 found that even one inch of unnatural sedimentation in the habitat causes high mortality rates in most mussels, including the Appalachian ekltoe (Ellis). Juveniles and reproduction are also seriously affected by even small amounts of sedimentation. When the clean, well-oxygenated water of the mussels' habitat gets a certain amount of sedimentation, the juveniles are not able to develop properly, because the silt clogs the gills of the host fish that they parasitize themselves on. Most mussels are sensitive to many pollutants, and some of the most harmful pollutants are different forms of heavy metals, higher than normal concentrations of nutrients, and chlorine.

Because of the irregularity of the habitat of the Appalachian elktoe and similar mussel species, on September 27, 2002, over 144 miles (232 km) of river area in western North Carolina and eastern Tennessee were deemed critical habitat. Critical habitat is an area that the government has reserved for monitoring and protecting, in an effort to save species currently inhabiting that area. By declaring the Appalachian elktoe's habitat critical, it allows for management plans to be fully implemented and for penalties or fines to be created for partaking in activities that may lead to the species' decline.

=== Recovery plan ===
In August 1996, a recovery plan was published in order to save the endangered mussels. It is a regional plan that includes all the areas where the species currently lives, and also areas where the species was thought to live in the past.

The ultimate goal of the recovery plan is, of course, to upgrade the species off the Endangered Species List. Presently the Appalachian elktoe is considered critically endangered, and it is unknown if they are still in fact actively reproducing.

Originally when the recovery plan was made, the species was supposed to be down-listed from endangered to threatened. There are four main steps to the recovery plan that promote the de-listing of the Appalachian elktoe. The first step, whether by establishing new populations or by protecting existing populations, is to have at least four stable populations of Appalachian elktoe surviving in sites that are thought to be in their historic range. Ideally there will be one population in each of the Little Tennessee, French Broad, and Nolichucky River systems. The second step, which can only be accomplished after the first step is deemed a success, is to create different age groups of the mussels in these river systems. Three age groups must be surviving in order for a population to keep reproducing: juveniles, adults, and developing larvae (glochidia). The third step in the recovery plan is to keep all the new populations of mussels in stabilized and unthreatened habitat. This will be done by monitoring the streams frequently and protecting them from threatening factors of the past, as well as possible threats that might occur in future instances. The fourth and final step to recovering the Appalachian elktoe is to maintain stability in all four populations, and possibly have them increasing by the next ten or fifteen years.

In order for the species to be completely de-listed, more criteria must be met. Instead of only four viable, reproducing populations of Appalachian elktoe, there must be a least six that are surviving on their own. Like the initial recovery plan, ideally there will be at least one population in the Little Tennessee, French Broad, and Nolichucky River systems. The next requirement is to have at least three age classes in each of the six populations. This includes a whole age class of juveniles and gravid females, in order to make sure reproduction is occurring, and occurring steadily. Once this goal is met, the next requirement for de-listing is to make sure that the habitats of these populations are not in danger or susceptible to habitat destruction. Finally, like the fourth requirement in the first recovery plan, the last criteria for delisting is that all six populations remain stable and hopefully increasing steadily within a period of ten to fifteen years.

In order to take all the necessary steps in these recovery plans, some actions need to be taken. The first and most important action to saving the Appalachian elktoe is to utilize legislation and keep the species protected at all times. Along with informing local and federal legislation about the endangered species, the public needs to be informed as well. Education programs on mussels in the Southeastern region of the United States are crucial, not only for the survival of the Appalachian elktoe, but also for the survival of other similar endangered mussels in the area. Another very important action to take is constant monitoring of the existing populations as well as searching and controlling developing populations. Monitoring the species is crucial in recovery, but unfortunately not a lot of information has been collected on the Appalachian elktoe. In order to fully benefit from all the steps of the recovery more information must be found. This is one of the most important actions needed to be taken. Ideally, the species' historical records, habitat requirements, and threats will all be found over the course of the recovery plan. By determining important factors such as previous distribution and exact diet, it will enable the use of the most valuable information on how to save the Appalachian elktoe. Discovering this information also will permit implementation of valuable and informative management plans.

The costs of the recovery plan were originally unknown. Because of the lack of information on the species, it is not known exactly what funding needs to be spent on, and also how much needs to be spent. It is estimated that the costs will increase annually over the ten to fifteen-year period. This is so because as more research is found, hopefully more species will have been established more species which will require more funds. The costs of this recovery are difficult to establish also because it normally takes mussels until age five to start reproducing, therefore a full ten years is needed to study reproduction rates and what affects them.
