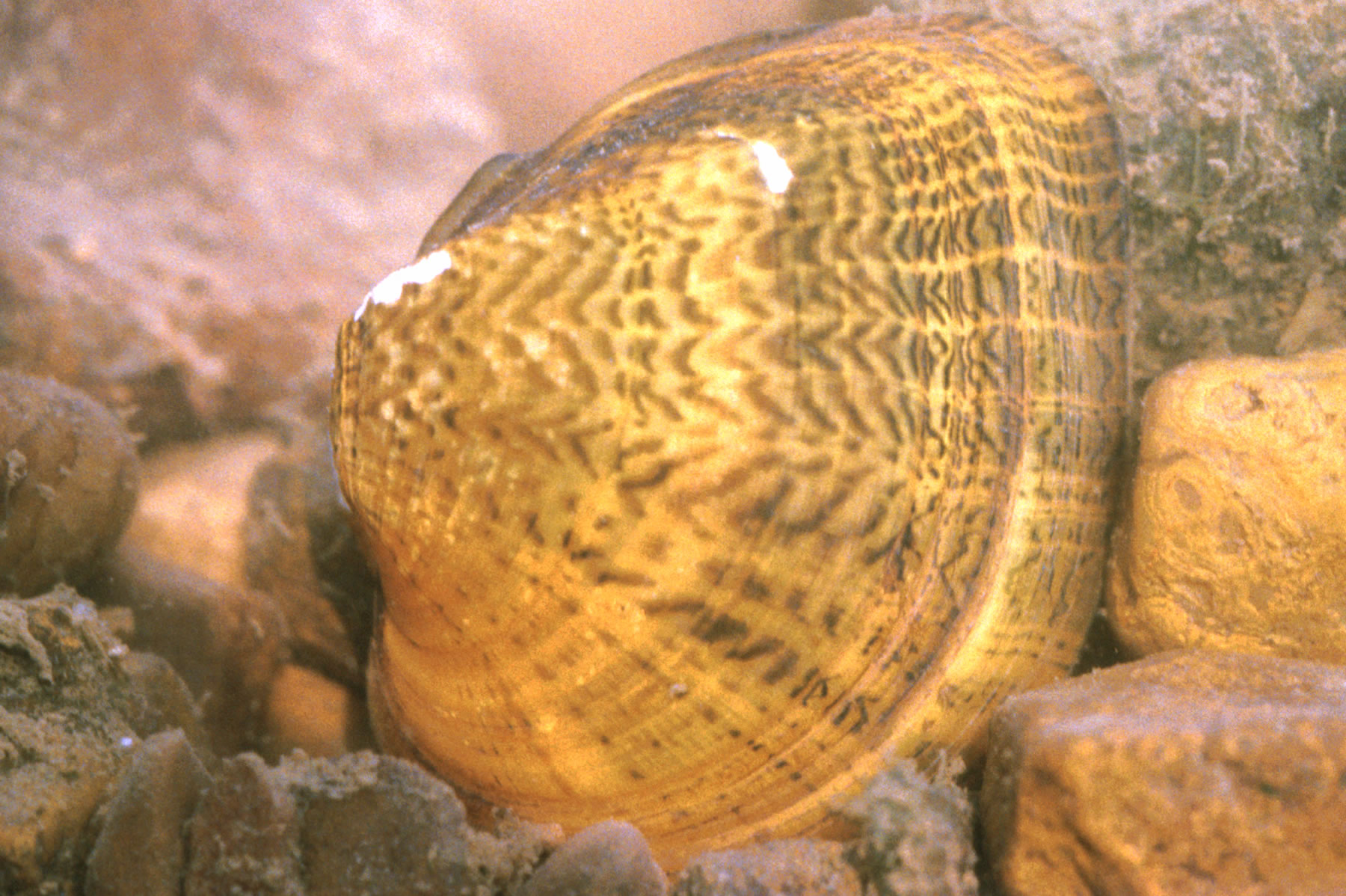

Conservation status
- Secure (NatureServe)

Scientific classification
- Domain: Eukaryota
- Kingdom: Animalia
- Phylum: Mollusca
- Class: Bivalvia
- Order: Unionida
- Family: Unionidae
- Genus: Truncilla
- Species: T. truncata

Binomial name
- Truncilla truncata Rafinesque, 1820

= Truncilla truncata =

Species of bivalve

Truncilla truncata, the deertoe, is a species of freshwater mussel, an aquatic bivalve mollusk in the family Unionidae.

Deertoe are found in the Mississippi River drainage system and in tributaries of Lake Erie and Lake St. Clair. T. truncata is a state endangered species in Virginia. It is designated by the state of Kansas as a "species in need of conservation".

Deertoe have generalist habitat preferences and are found in both lakes and rivers.

Deertoe are believed to be bradytictic, with a gestation period of approximately 10 months. Hosts for their glochidia include freshwater drum (Aplodinotus grunniens) and sauger (Sander canadensis).
