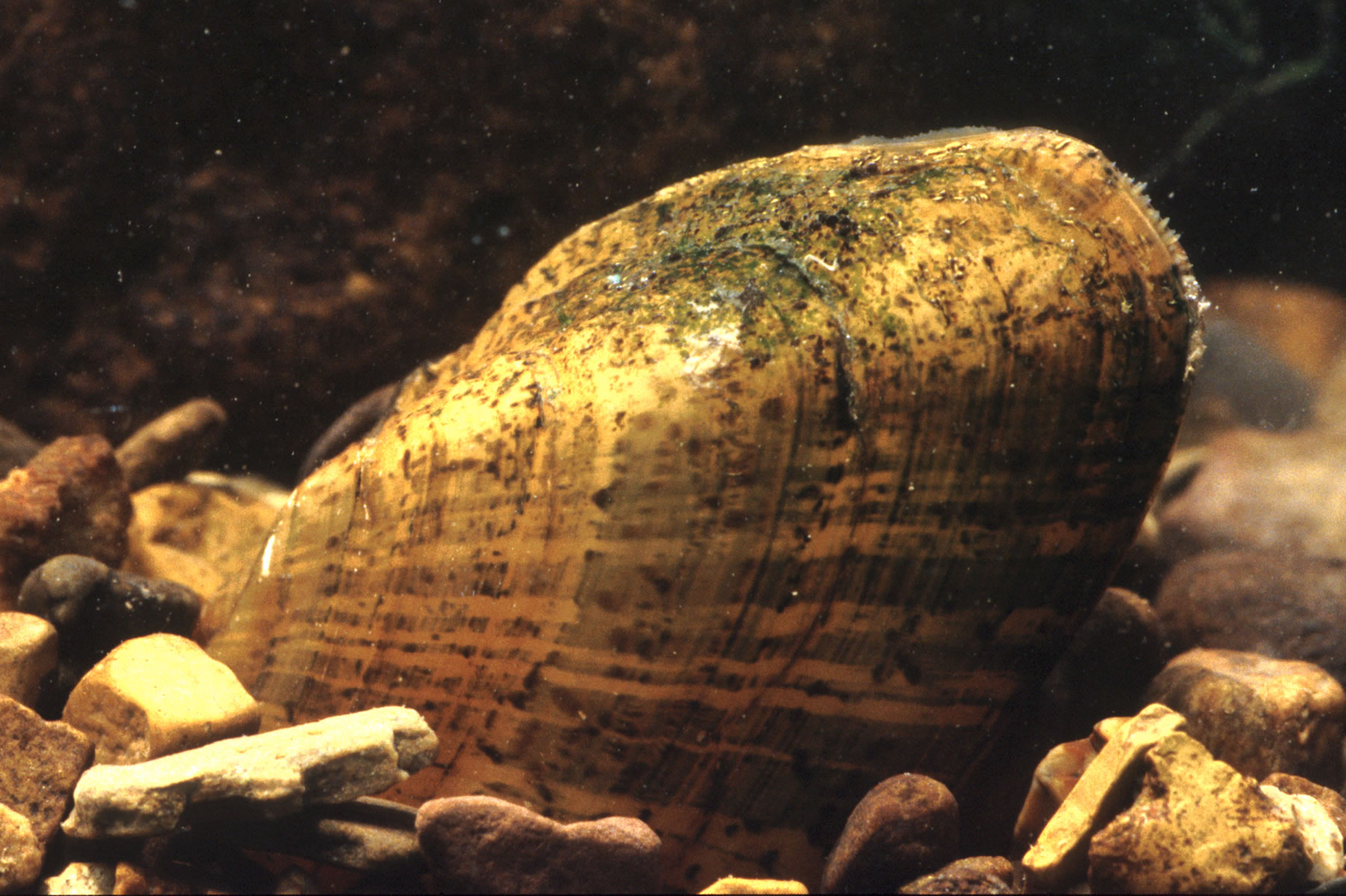

Conservation status
- Least Concern (IUCN 3.1)

- Apparently Secure (NatureServe)

Scientific classification
- Kingdom: Animalia
- Phylum: Mollusca
- Class: Bivalvia
- Order: Unionida
- Family: Unionidae
- Genus: Alasmidonta
- Species: A. marginata

Binomial name
- Alasmidonta marginata Say, 1818

= Elktoe =

Species of bivalve

The elktoe (Alasmidonta marginata) is a species of freshwater mussel, an aquatic bivalve mollusk in the family Unionidae, the river mussels. This species is found in southeastern Canada and the eastern United States. Like many mussels, it is threatened by water pollution from agriculture, industry, and other development, such as acid mine drainage and sedimentation. It may be extinct in Oklahoma.

== Description ==
The elktoe is a moderately sized mussel of about 4 inches. The shell is thin and triangular-shaped with an inflated center. The anterior end is elongated and round and the border of the shell is marked with fine ridges. The hinge of the two shells, or umbo, is large and located near the center of the shell. The shell is a dull yellowish-green with multiple rays and dark green spots. The interior of the shell is a glossy bluish-white and may have some salmon near the edges and beak. The beak consists of double-looped ridges lined with thin teeth. The elktoe most closely resembles the snuffbox and deertoe, however, both lack a beak and teeth.

== Ecology ==
The elktoe is most commonly found in small, fast-moving, and shallow rivers, however, it can survive in larger bodies of water. The elktoe prefers a sand or gravel substrate. Substantial populations are found from Northeastern Canada to Arkansas. It is found along the east coast from New York to Virginia but remains inland further South. The majority of the elktoe population is found in Ohio, Indiana, and Illinois. The species was once found in Alabama but is now believed to have been extirpated as there have been no recordings in the past few decades.

Like other mussels, the elktoe may live for many decades and up to a century buried in rocks and other sediment. They are mostly sedentary but may use their foot, a muscle on the inside of the shell, to move around by extending and contracting the mussel between the two shells.

The elktoe is a filter feeder and eats mostly bacteria, algae, and other organic matter. Water is drawn into the body through the siphon, and food and oxygen are removed from the water which is then pumped out through the siphon.

Mussels are gonochoristic, meaning there are separate sexes. The elktoe breeds during warm months and females will keep the larval forms, called glochidia, in the marsupia for up to eleven months. Once released, the larva must attach to the gills of a host fish, where they are parasitic on the fish until becoming a juvenile mussel. Juvenile mussels will then live in substrate and filter feed until they develop into adults.

== Conservation ==
All freshwater mussels in North America have suffered an extreme decline in population growth and increase in extinction rate due to habitat loss, deterioration, fragmentation, and pollution. The elktoe also experiences predation and competition with invasive species. In the Mississippi River, the Zebra mussel will attach in large numbers to native mussels, including the elktoe, and cause suffocation and eventual death. Future conservation efforts should focus on maintaining the natural habitat of the mussels from deterioration and pollution from both industrial and residential points. In addition to protecting the elktoe, the most common host fish must also be protected, such as the White sucker, Rock bass, and Warmouth.
