= Centre Street Bridge =

Center Street Bridge or Centre Street Bridge may refer to:

- Centre Street Bridge (Newark) in Newark, New Jersey, no longer standing
- Centre Street Bridge (Calgary) in Calgary, Alberta, Canada; seen in the movie Exit Wounds.
- Center Street Bridge (Cleveland), swing bridge over the Cuyahoga River in Cleveland, Ohio
- Center Street Bridge (Salem, Oregon), a road bridge over the Willamette River in Salem, Oregon
