= Slaughter alley =

Colloquial name for a dangerous roadway

Slaughter alley is an American colloquial name given for sections of highway known for high rates of fatal traffic accidents.

== Examples ==
=== Australia ===
Eyre Highway on the Nullarbor Plain in southern Australia is said to be the straightest, flattest road in the world. In this case it is the monotony of the straight, narrow road combined with long trucks (road trains, the air blast from which can cause car drivers to lose control) that present the hazard.

=== Brazil ===
Rodovia Régis Bittencourt, a section of the BR-116 that connects the cities of Taboão da Serra, São Paulo, and Curitiba, Paraná, was considered one of the most deadly highways of Brazil until the 2000s, due to the heavy vehicle traffic, rugged topography and poor road maintenance.

=== Canada ===
In 2009, the Canadian Automobile Association published a list of the most dangerous roads in Canada.

- Between 2004 and 2009, the 400-kilometre (250 mi) undivided stretch of Highway 63 in Alberta saw 22 deaths and more than 250 injuries. The remote highway is the main route to Fort McMurray and has seen extraordinary increases in traffic volume with accelerated development of the Alberta Oil Sands. Between 2003 and 2015, a total of 190 people have died on Highway 63 and Highway 881.
- A 14-kilometre (8.7 mi) section of Highway 1 through the Canadian Rockies. Funds were committed in 2008 to upgrade the highway.

=== Croatia ===
The A3 motorway section from Nova Gradiška to Slavonski Brod is believed to be cursed because of the many accidents that happen there each year. In a year and a half, 12 people died and 21 were injured, including well-known Macedonian singer Toše Proeski.

=== Israel ===
Highway 31 in southern Israel, 24 km between Sdom and Arad, is said to be pinned with obelisks for the dead. Other parts of the road are prone to fatal accidents due to a single lane in each direction and lack of separation between the lanes. The 31 km of the road had been declared as red road (a road that has more than average number of fatal accidents) by Or Yarok.

=== United States ===
- "Blood Alley" or "Death Trap Highway": California State Route 138 (Pearblossom Highway) east of Palmdale and west of Interstate 15.
- California Deathway: California State Route 138. The road, which runs from Interstate 15 to Palmdale, averaged some 10 fatalities per year prior to improvements that began in 2006. In the decade after the improvements were completed, fatalities decreased thanks to upgrades like wider lanes.
- "Coffin corridor": Interstate 95 in Jasper County, South Carolina has gained notoriety for its high number of mass car accidents. The 33-mile stretch of highway has been called "coffin corridor" due to the numerous fatalities that have occurred on the road.
- "Slaughter Alley": The old Highway 101 in California just south of the San Onofre nuclear power plant before I-5 was built was called "Slaughter Alley" due the number of fatalities, including a Greyhound bus and a fuel tanker.
- "Blood Alley": Monterey Road, the old U.S. 101 surface routing between Gilroy and San Jose, was known as "Blood Alley" due to heavy traffic and an accident rate 3 times higher than average in the 1970s. The four-lane undivided highway was replaced with a modern freeway routing in 1984.
- "Killer 17" and "Blood Alley.": The four lane section of California State Route 17 has a combination of narrow lanes, dense traffic, slow trucks, sharp turns, blind curves, poor weather, sudden changes in traffic speeds, and wandering fauna such as deer, wild turkeys, and mountain lions, which has led to a number of collisions and fatalities. Because of this, SR 17 is considered to be one of the most dangerous highways in the state.
- "Suicide 6" or the "Suicide Route": The section of U.S. Route 6 in Connecticut between Columbia, Connecticut and Bolton, Connecticut has been the site of at least 30 fatal motor vehicle accidents.

== See also ==
- Dead Man's Curve
- Accident blackspot
