= Dead Man's Curve =

Curve in a road that has claimed lives because of numerous crashes

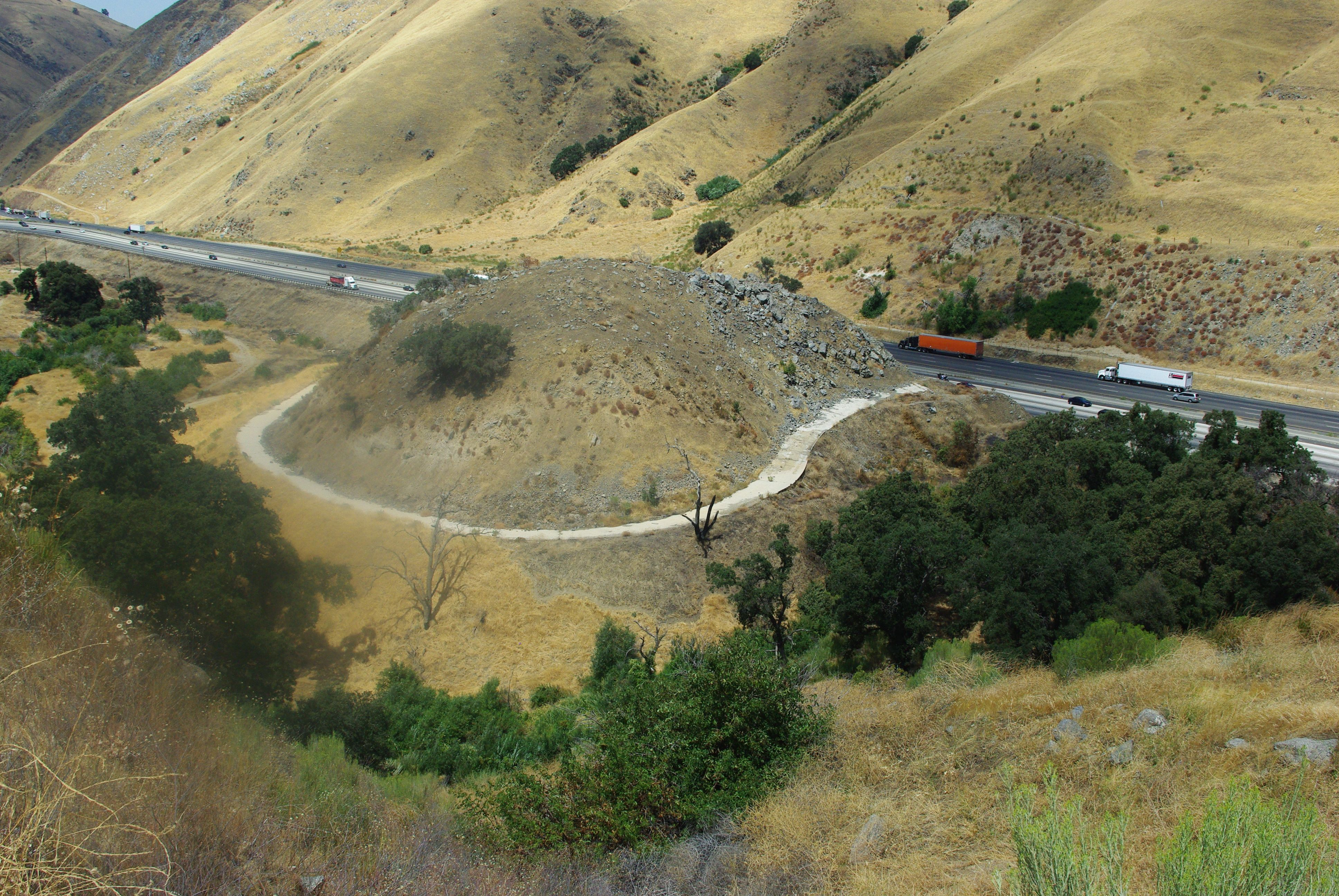
A section of the 1915 Ridge Route in Lebec, California, abandoned when US 99 (later upgraded to I-5) was constructed over the Tejon Pass in order to make travel straighter and safer.

Dead Man's Curve is an American nickname for a curve in a road that has claimed many lives because of numerous crashes.

== Examples ==
=== United States ===
==== California ====
- A curve on Sunset Boulevard in Los Angeles memorialized in the hit song "Dead Man's Curve" by Jan and Dean. The song's lyrics place the location of the "Dead Man's Curve" accident at the curve on westbound Sunset Boulevard just west of Doheny Drive in West Hollywood. Voice actor Mel Blanc was severely injured while driving here in 1961, and later sued the City of Los Angeles, prompting a reconstruction of the road. However, the earlier lyrics suggest the long straight starting at "Sunset and Vine" and going past "LaBrea, Schwab's (Pharmacy), and Crescent Heights" (Blvd) would suggest the first curve hit (at a high speed) would be the one at Marmont Lane, 2.4 miles (3.9 km) before Doheny. (As it is, the "drag" from Vine to Marmont is also 2.4 miles, but entirely straight.)
- A series of curves in the 21600 block of Pacific Coast Highway just east of Carbon Canyon Road in Malibu, California, which has been noted as hazardous.
- A curve on Irvine Avenue in Newport Beach between Santa Isabel Ave and Heather Lane. The four-lane residential road drops with an off-camber curve to the right making the negotiation of the route dangerous over the posted speed limit of 35 mph (56 km/h). Numerous accidents which resulted in airborne vehicles flipping over and fatalities have occurred there. Most notorious was an accident on May 14, 1997, in which an SUV, packed with 10 Newport Harbor High Students, returning from a party with a designated driver, took the curve too fast, hit the center divider and flipped, peeling back the roof and ejecting eight of the passengers. The group had been involved in underage drinking at a party in a local home. The driver was not drinking; investigators concluded vehicular speed was a factor.

==== Colorado ====
- A sharp turn on eastbound Interstate 70 just west of exit 259 near Morrison, Colorado that is preceded by a 7-mile (11 km) stretch of a 6.5% grade downslope, which has been the site of numerous fatal runaway truck accidents.

==== Illinois ====
- A curve on Historic Route 66 at Towanda, Illinois.

==== Michigan ====
- In Marquette Township in Marquette County, Michigan, Dead Man's Curve referred to a curve on County Road 492 (46.5318°N 87.474°W), where the first state highway center line in the United States was painted when the road was part of State Highway M-15.

==== Minnesota ====
- A curve on Minnesota State Highway 73, two miles south of Kettle River, where a caravan of cars attempting to escape the Cloquet-Moose Lake fire encountered heavy smoke and ran off the road on October 12, 1918. Some of the refugees escaped to a nearby stream, but others were trapped by the advancing flames. Estimates of the deaths vary from 75 to 100; many of the victims' bodies could not be identified, while others known to be missing were never found.

==== New Mexico ====
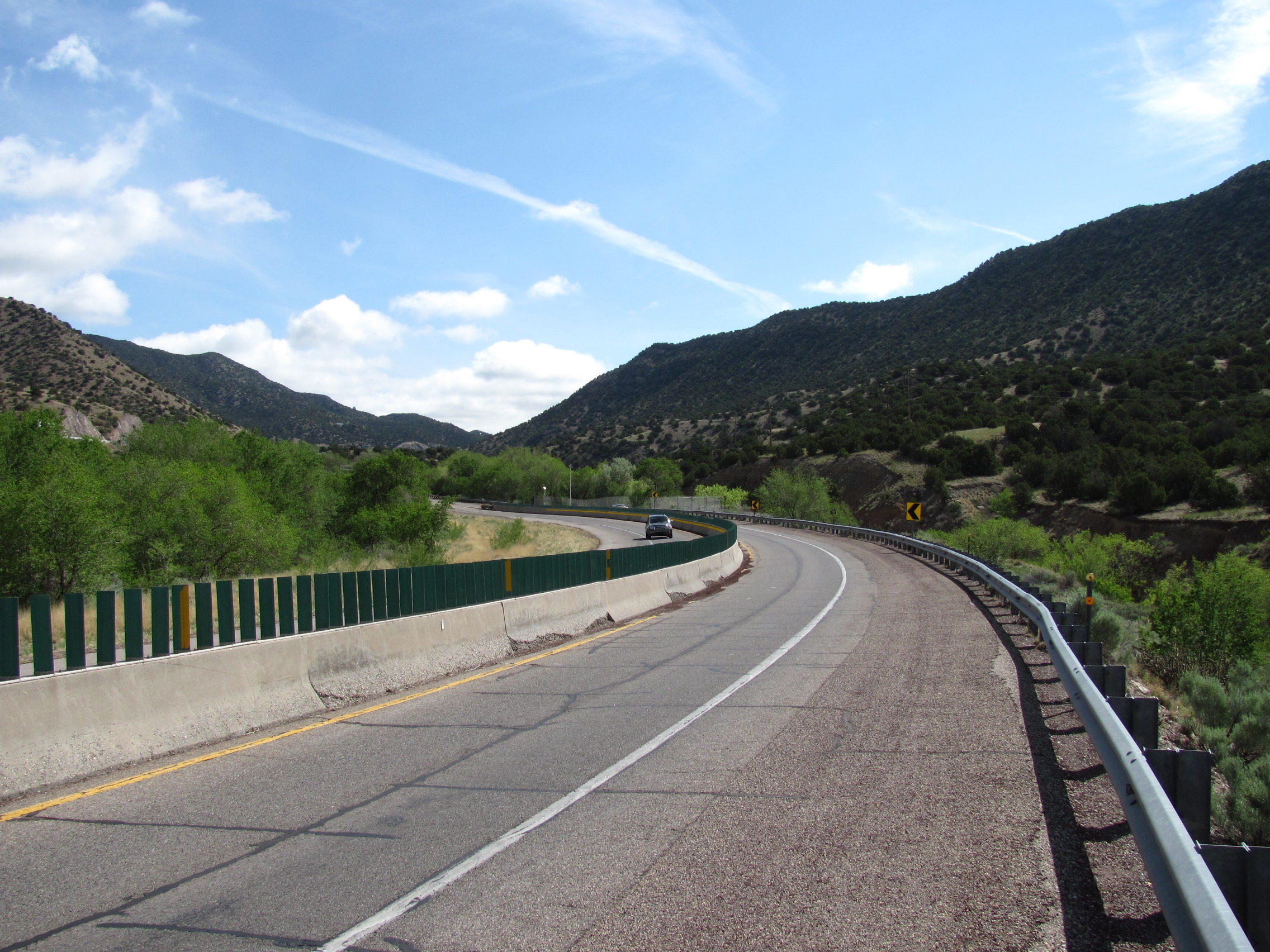
Dead Man's Curve on old U.S. Route 66 in New Mexico

- Between Albuquerque and Tijeras, State Road 333 (previously known as U.S. Route 66) makes a sudden curve near the I-40 overpass. This stretch of highway has earned its name because of the rocky cliffs on the south side of the highway, and frequent deer traffic contributes to its hazardousness.

==== New York ====
- Union Square, Manhattan had a long history of traffic congestion extending back to the 1890s, when trolley lines were first installed. Two parallel trolley lines made a double curve at the southwest corner of Broadway and Fourteenth Street. In spite of traffic wardens on duty, the trolleys regularly struck pedestrians crossing the tracks in the busy shopping district around the park. By 1930, the Fourteenth Street Association, a retail business association headed by its president, H. Prescott Beach, had successfully lobbied the New York transit authority to remove the above-ground rails, and move routes underground.

==== Ohio ====
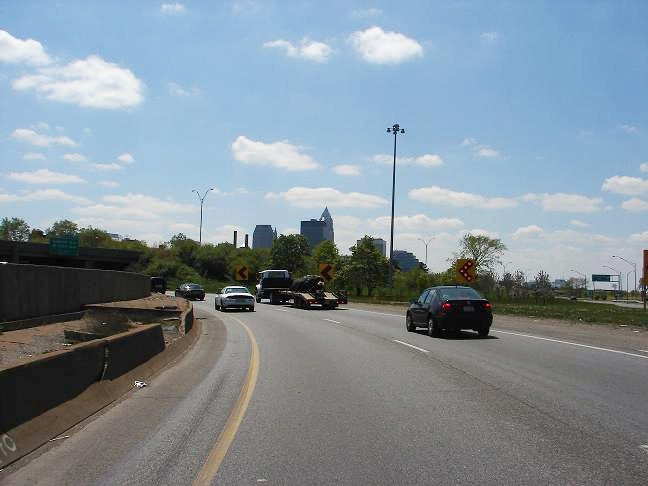
Dead Man's Curve in Cleveland, Ohio

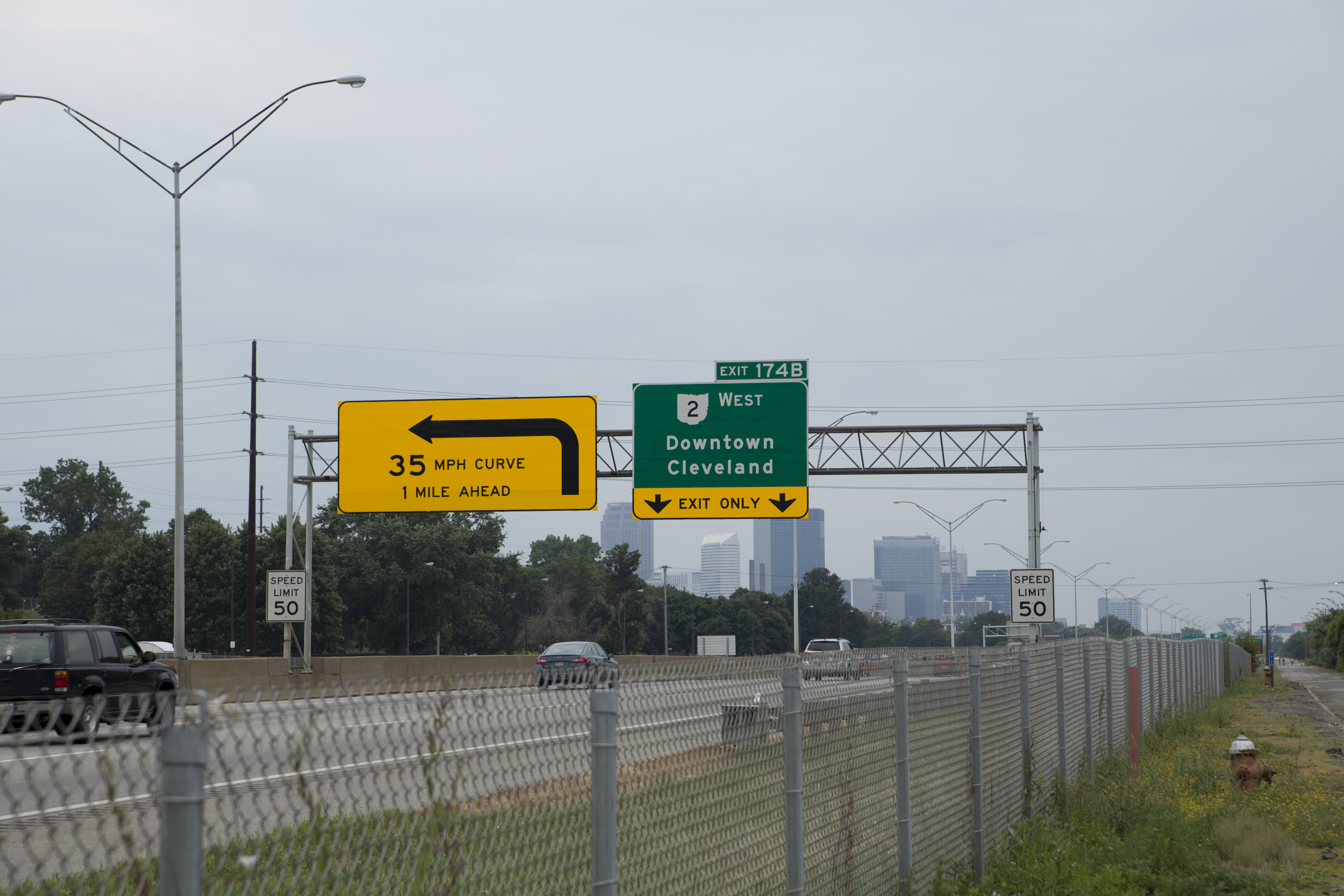
Warning sign for Cleveland's Dead Man's Curve

- The name is applied to the nearly 90° turn on Interstate 90 near downtown Cleveland, Ohio. Officially called the "Innerbelt Curve", it is where the Cleveland Memorial Shoreway connects to the Innerbelt Freeway at a modified trumpet interchange just south of Burke Lakefront Airport, and was so designed to account for the airport. There have been proposals to improve it since the 1960s, soon after it opened; as of 2023 a modification study is underway.

==== Pennsylvania ====
- A curve on a section of Interstate 76 near Conshohocken, Pennsylvania, known as the "Conshohocken Curve" by many people, has been the site of several fatal and nonfatal crashes.

==== South Carolina ====
- A dangerous curve on South Carolina Highway 9 about 10 miles (16 km) west of Chester, South Carolina, has been the site of several fatal crashes.

==== Washington ====
- Highway 101 in Washington, in between Sequim and Port Angeles.

== See also ==
- Hairpin turn
- Slaughter alley
- Kamikaze Curve
