= Innerbelts and outerbelts =

An innerbelt or outerbelt is a ring road or collection of roadways which is or implies that it is inner or outer ring road in relation to another ring road. Use of these terms is most common and near-exclusive to routes in the United States, mostly in the state of Ohio.

== Examples ==
- Akron, Ohio – Akron's innerbelt is designated as Ohio State Route 59, from its terminus at Interstate 76 (I-76) to its proposed end at State Route 8.
- Charlotte, North Carolina – Charlotte's innerbelt is composed of I-277 orbiting to the east, south, and north of downtown and of I-77 covering the west side.
- Chicago, Illinois – Chicago's outerbelt is a collection of bikeways and hiking trails which form a loop around Chicago's southern and central regions.
- Cleveland, Ohio – Cleveland's innerbelt is formed by the confluence of I-90 and the northern terminuses of I-71 and I-77. This short stretch of highway ends at "Dead Man's Curve". Cleveland's innerbelt was planned as a closed loop. The highway is in the early stages of an extensive rebuild (the record of decision (ROD) was issued on September 18, 2009). This rebuild includes replacement of the Innerbelt Bridge along its route by the George V. Voinovich Bridges. I-271, which runs on the east side of the Cleveland area down to the I-71 interchange south of Cleveland, and parts of I-480, are sometimes referred to as the Outerbelt.
- Columbus, Ohio – In Columbus, the innerbelt is formed by I-670 to the north, I-71 to the east, I-70 to the south, and Ohio State Route 315 to the west. Columbus and Cleveland may be the only cities in the United States to frequently refer to one of its highways (Interstate 270 in Columbus) as The Outerbelt.

== See also ==
- Interstate 695 (Massachusetts), an innerbelt highway that was planned but not ultimately built
- Inner–outer directions
