= Hope Memorial Bridge =

Art deco truss bridge in Cleveland, Ohio, US

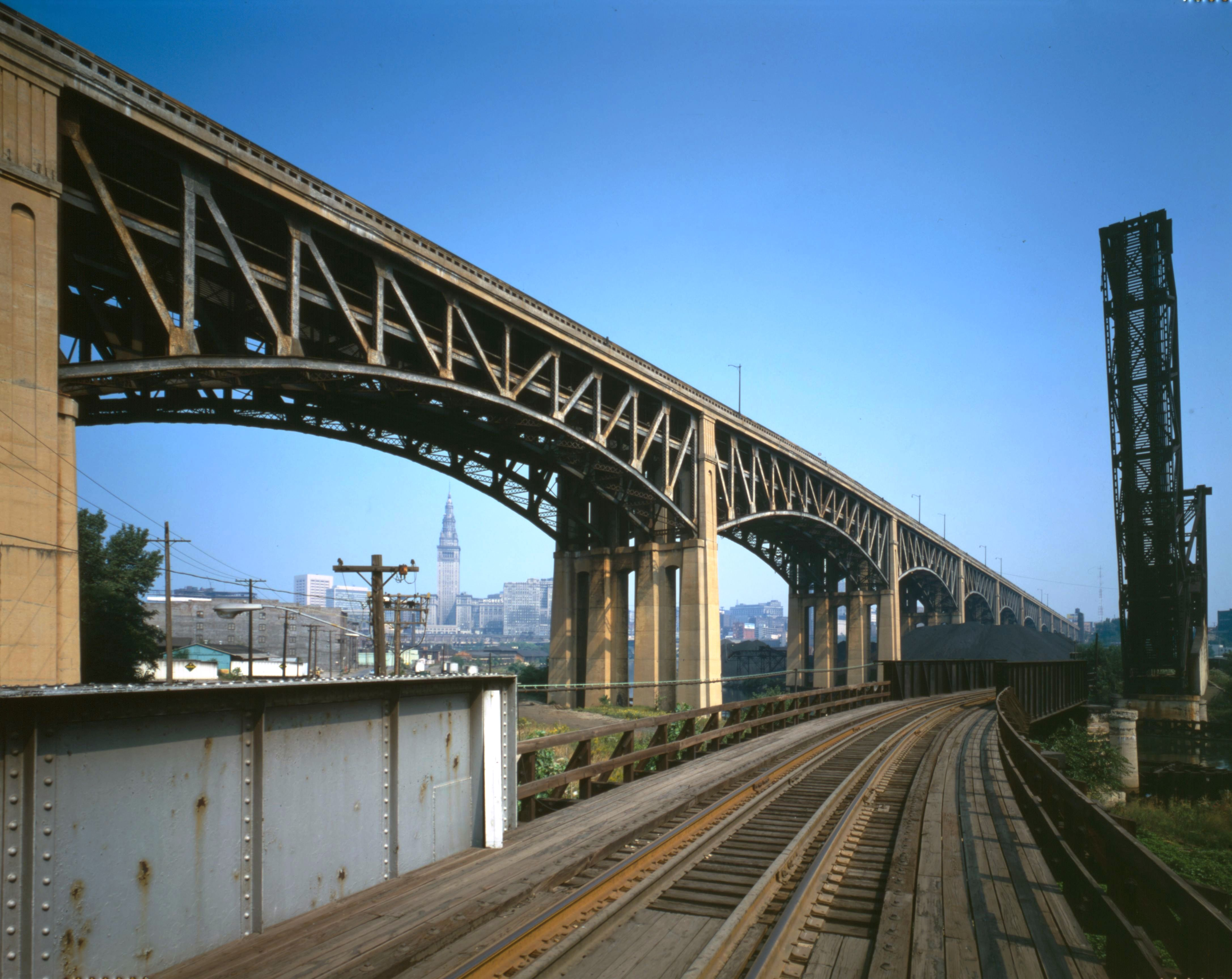
- The Lorain–Carnegie Bridge circa 1970s
- Coordinates: 41.489407°N 81.693554°W
- Carries: SR 10
- Crosses: Cuyahoga River
- Locale: Cleveland, Ohio

Characteristics
- Design: Art deco truss bridge
- Total length: 4,490.0 feet (1,368.55 m)
- Longest span: 229.0 feet (69.80 m)
- Clearance below: 93 feet (28.3 m)

History
- Construction end: 1932
- Lorain-Carnegie Bridge
- U.S. National Register of Historic Places
- Location within Cleveland Location within Ohio Location within the United States
- Location: Spans Cuyahoga River between Lorain and Carnegie Aves., Cleveland, Ohio
- Coordinates: 41.489407°N 81.693554°W
- Area: 8.5 acres (3.4 ha)
- Built: 1927
- Architectural style: Art Deco, cantilever deck truss bridge
- NRHP reference No.: 76001398
- Added to NRHP: October 8, 1976

Location
- Interactive map of Hope Memorial Bridge

The Hope Memorial Bridge (also known as the Lorain–Carnegie Bridge) is a 4,490-foot-long (1,370 m) art deco truss bridge crossing the Cuyahoga River in Cleveland, Ohio. The bridge connects Lorain Avenue on Cleveland's west side and Carnegie Avenue on the east side, terminating just short of Progressive Field.

Four pairs of statues designed by sculptor Henry Hering and architect Frank Walker, officially named the Guardians of Traffic, are sculpted onto opposite-facing ends of two pairs of pylons, a pair at each end of the viaduct. They symbolize progress in transportation. Each Guardian holds a different vehicle in its hands: a hay wagon, a covered wagon, a stagecoach, and a 1930s-era automobile, as well as four types of motorized trucks used for construction. The statues are composed of Berea Sandstone and were carved in Cleveland's Little Italy neighborhood.

== History ==
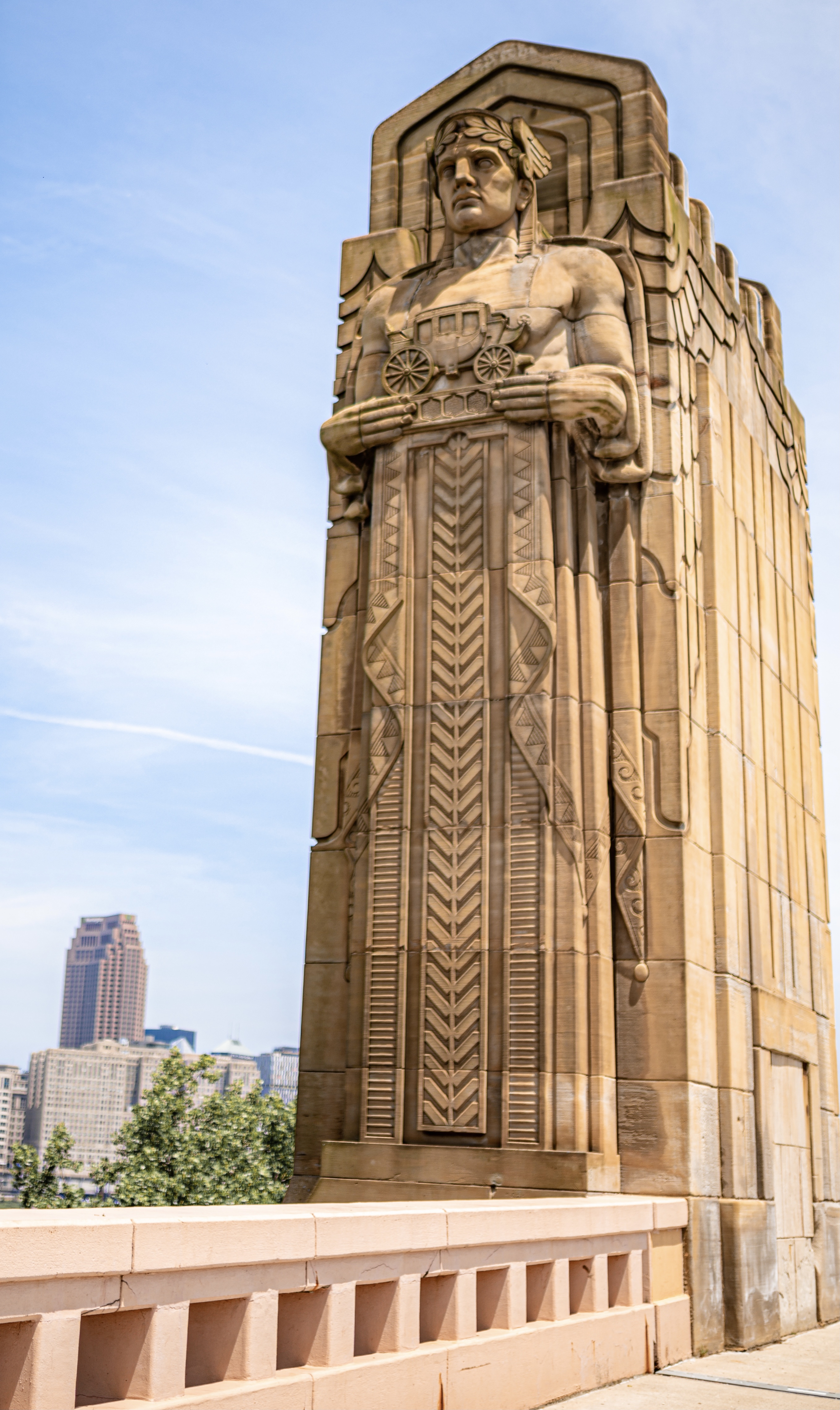
One of the eight Guardians of Traffic

A bond issue to pay for the bridge was passed in 1921, but construction was delayed for years due to squabbles over how the money would be spent. The bridge was completed in 1932 at a cost of $4.75 million ($112,090,000 with inflation). It stands 93 feet (28 meters) above the river's waterline in order to allow shipping to pass unobstructed. A second, lower deck designed to carry truck and commercial traffic was never put into service.

The bridge had originally been planned to go through the location of the Erie Street Cemetery on East 9th Street.

The bridge was listed in the National Register of Historic Places on October 8, 1976, after a controversy in which Cuyahoga County engineer Albert S. Porter threatened to remove the historic pylons to widen the span, stating, "Those columns are monstrosities and should be torn down and forgotten. There is nothing particularly historic about any one of them. We're not running a May Show here."

The bridge was renovated in the early 1980s.

On September 1, 1983, the Lorain–Carnegie bridge was officially renamed the "Hope Memorial Bridge". Press reports vary regarding whom the name honors: William Henry "Harry" Hope, a local stonemason who helped build the Guardians of Traffic sculptures and the father of comedian and former Cleveland resident Bob Hope; Bob Hope himself; the entire Hope family; or Harry Hope along with the other workers who helped erect the Guardians of Traffic.

On December 10, 2012, officials opened a 14.5-foot-wide (4.4 m) multi-use path on the north side of the bridge, part of a project which also added lighting to the Guardians of Traffic.

The inaugural Guardian Mile road race was run across the bridge on August 11, 2018. The elite field boasts multiple Olympians and $14,000 up for grabs in prize money, as well as races for runners of all ages and levels.

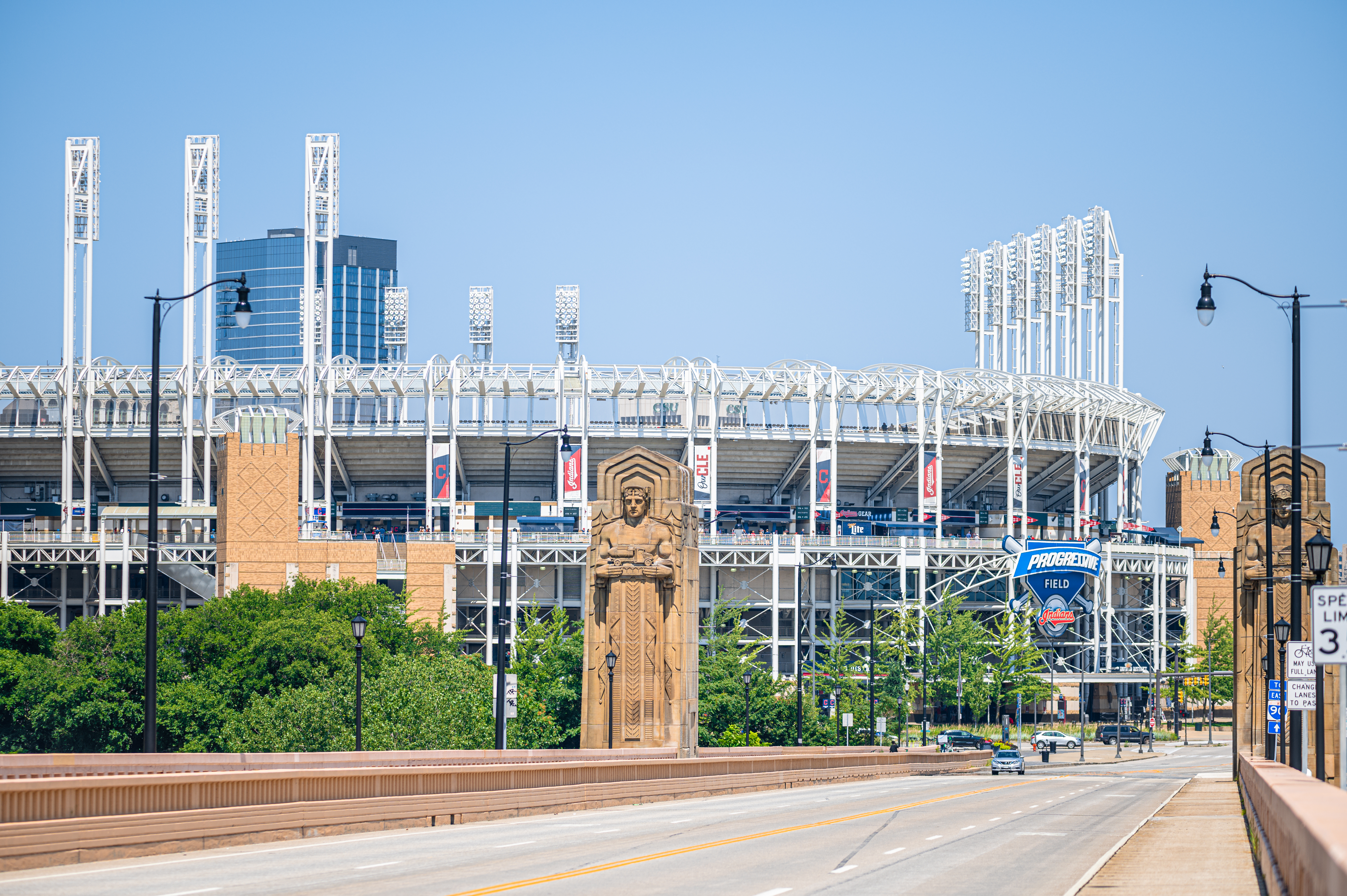
East end of bridge in relation to Progressive Field

On November 19, 2021, the Cleveland Indians of Major League Baseball changed their name to the Cleveland Guardians; the choice was inspired by the Guardians of Traffic, which neighbor Progressive Field, the team's home ballpark.

== See also ==
- Detroit–Superior Bridge
- List of bridges documented by the Historic American Engineering Record in Ohio
- List of crossings of the Cuyahoga River
