= Flats Industrial Railroad =

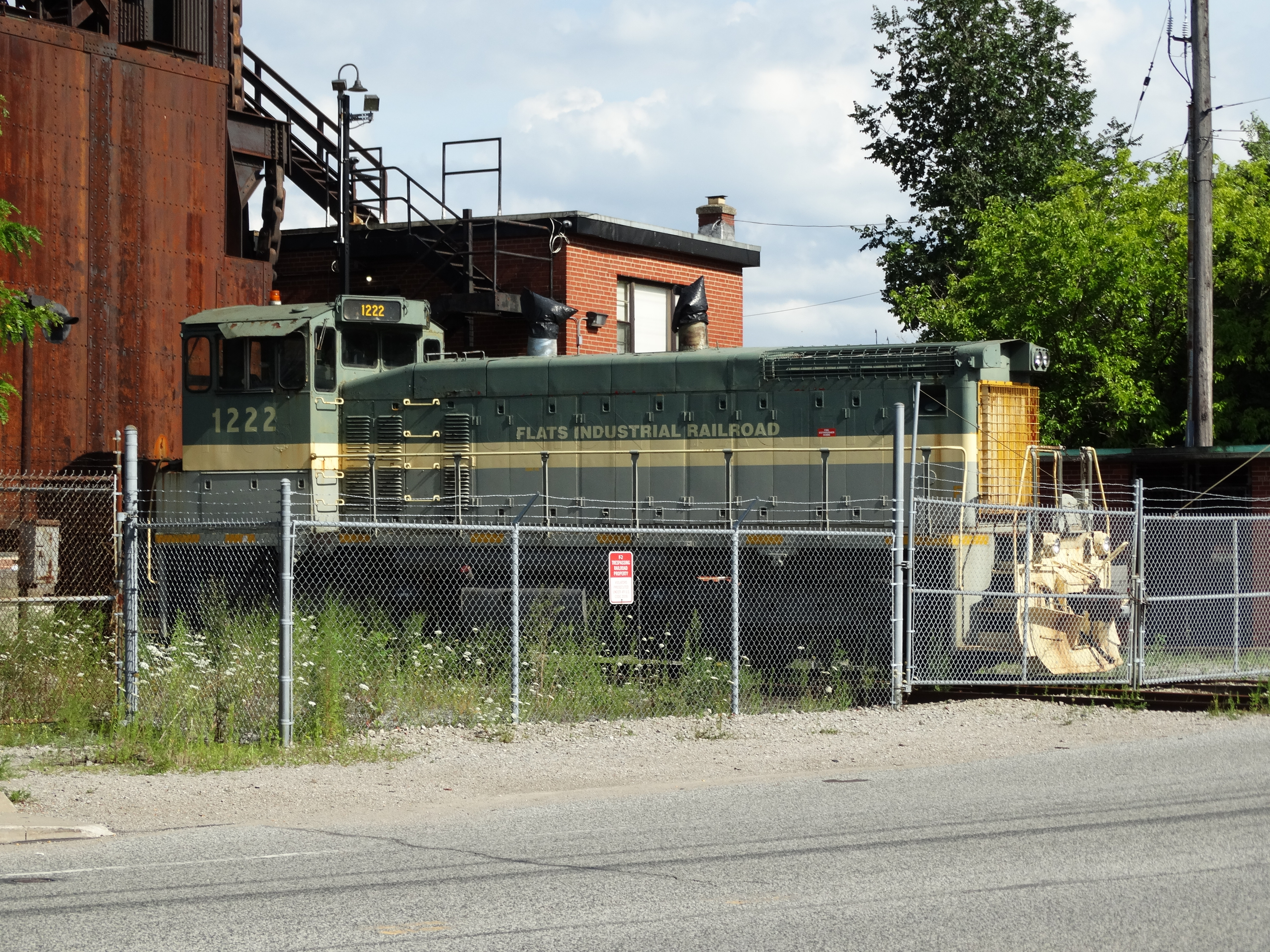

Overview
- Headquarters: 1757 Columbus Road, Cleveland, Cuyahoga County, Ohio 44113
- Reporting mark: FIR
- Locale: Cleveland, Cuyahoga County, Ohio
- Dates of operation: 1996–
- Predecessor: Conrail

Technical
- Track gauge: 4 ft 8 1/2 in (1,435 mm) standard gauge
- Length: 4 miles (6 km)

Flats Industrial Railroad vertical lift bridge
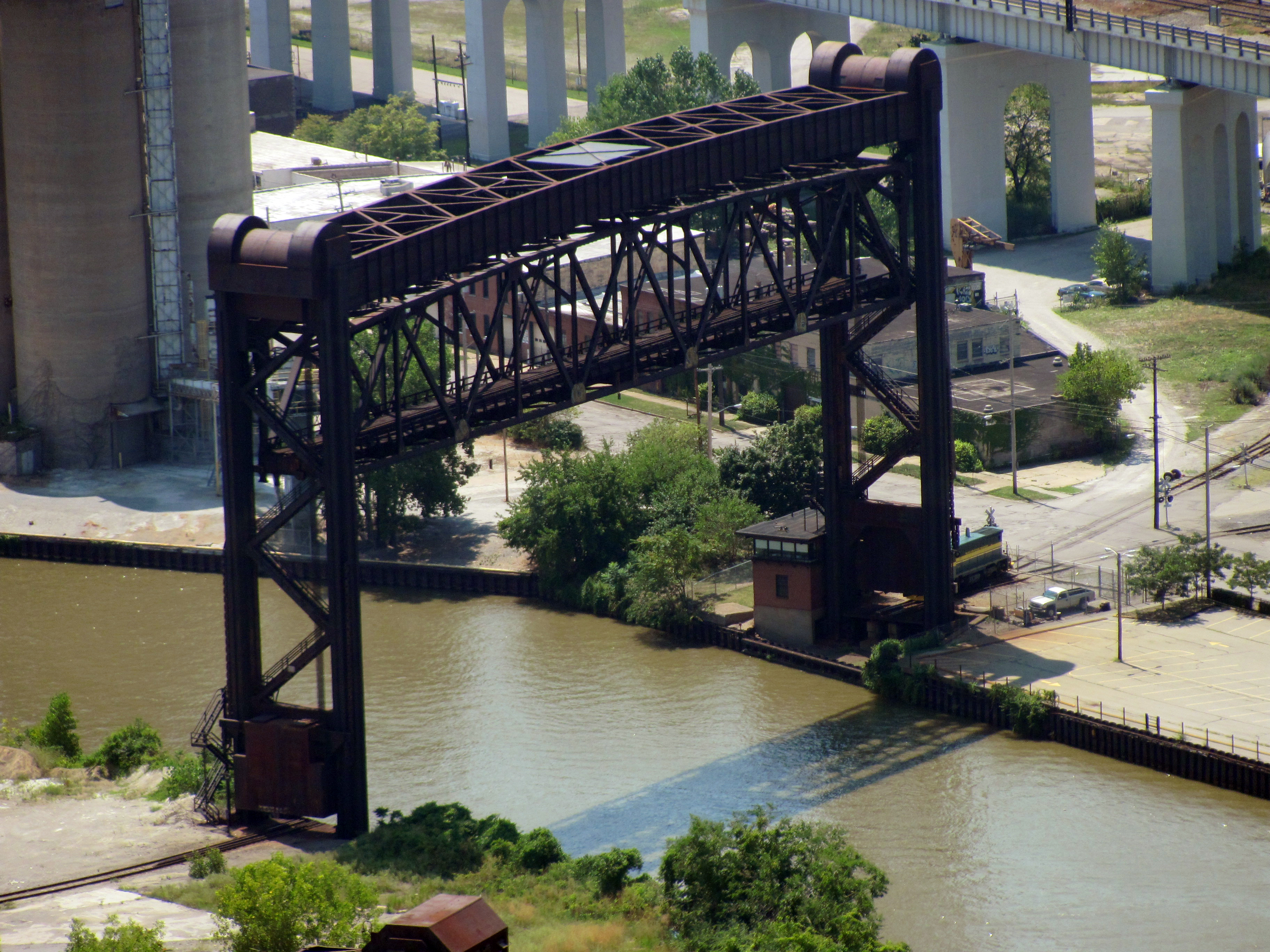
- Flats Industrial Railroad vertical lift bridge
- Coordinates: 41°29′31.5″N 81°41′59.25″W
- Carries: Flats Industrial Railroad
- Crosses: Cuyahoga River
- Locale: Cleveland, Cuyahoga County, Ohio
- Maintained by: Flats Industrial Railroad

Characteristics
- Design: Metal Riveted Warren Through Truss, Stationary, Vertical lift bridge
- Material: Steel
- Total length: 260 feet (79.2 m)
- Longest span: 260 feet (79.2 m)
- No. of spans: 1
- Piers in water: 0

History
- Opened: 1953

The Flats Industrial Railroad (reporting mark FIR) is a Class III railroad that provides short-line commercial/industrial switching service in Cleveland, Cuyahoga County, Ohio, primarily with CSX Transportation and the Norfolk Southern Railway.

== History ==
Trains have run in the Cuyahoga Valley since the 1880s. In 1880, the Valley Railway began operations, transporting coal to Cleveland, Akron, and Canton from the Tuscarawas River Valley and providing passenger service along the way. After a decade of operation, the Valley Railway became part of the Baltimore & Ohio Railroad. In the 20th century, competition from automobiles, trucks, and buses caused the decline of both freight and passenger service.

Right-of-way ownership shifted over the years from Valley Railway to the Cleveland Terminal & Valley Railway (CT&V), to the Baltimore and Ohio Railroad, to the Chessie System.

=== Today ===
Flats Industrial Railroad acquired its rails and right-of-way within the Flats District (Cleveland) from former Conrail. As of 2009, the Class III Short Line railroad operates as the Flats Industrial Railroad Company. The railroad operates on weekdays, reportedly around 7:00 to 10:00AM. At one time, they used to have a sand trans-loading business to keep themselves busy while not switching at Cleveland's Cereal Food Processors elevator. They also used to serve fatty oils and synthetic esters producer, "Werner G. Smith." They interchange with the Norfolk Southern in a yard between Fulton Road and W.41 Street in Cleveland, Ohio. The Cloggsville Line, operated by Norfolk Southern, serves that yard.

As recently as 2014, FIR had only two employees.

In April 2020, the railroad's primary customer, the Grain Craft flour mill on Merwin Avenue, announced it would be closing due to "challenging market dynamics and long-term supply chain obstacles."

== Equipment ==
Flats Industrial Railroad initially operated one switching locomotive, later adding a second locomotive, until 2021 when SW1200 #1202 was sold to the Davenport Industrial Railroad in Davenport, Iowa.

=== Locomotives ===
- EMD SW1500 #1222

== Accidents ==
In 2005, FIR reported a single Highway-Rail Crossing incident, no other accidents, and no one killed or injured. From 1996 to 2004 and 2006–2020, FIR did not report any accidents (train, highway-rail crossing, other incidents).

== See also ==
- Cleveland railroad history
- List of crossings of the Cuyahoga River
