= Columbus Road Bridge =

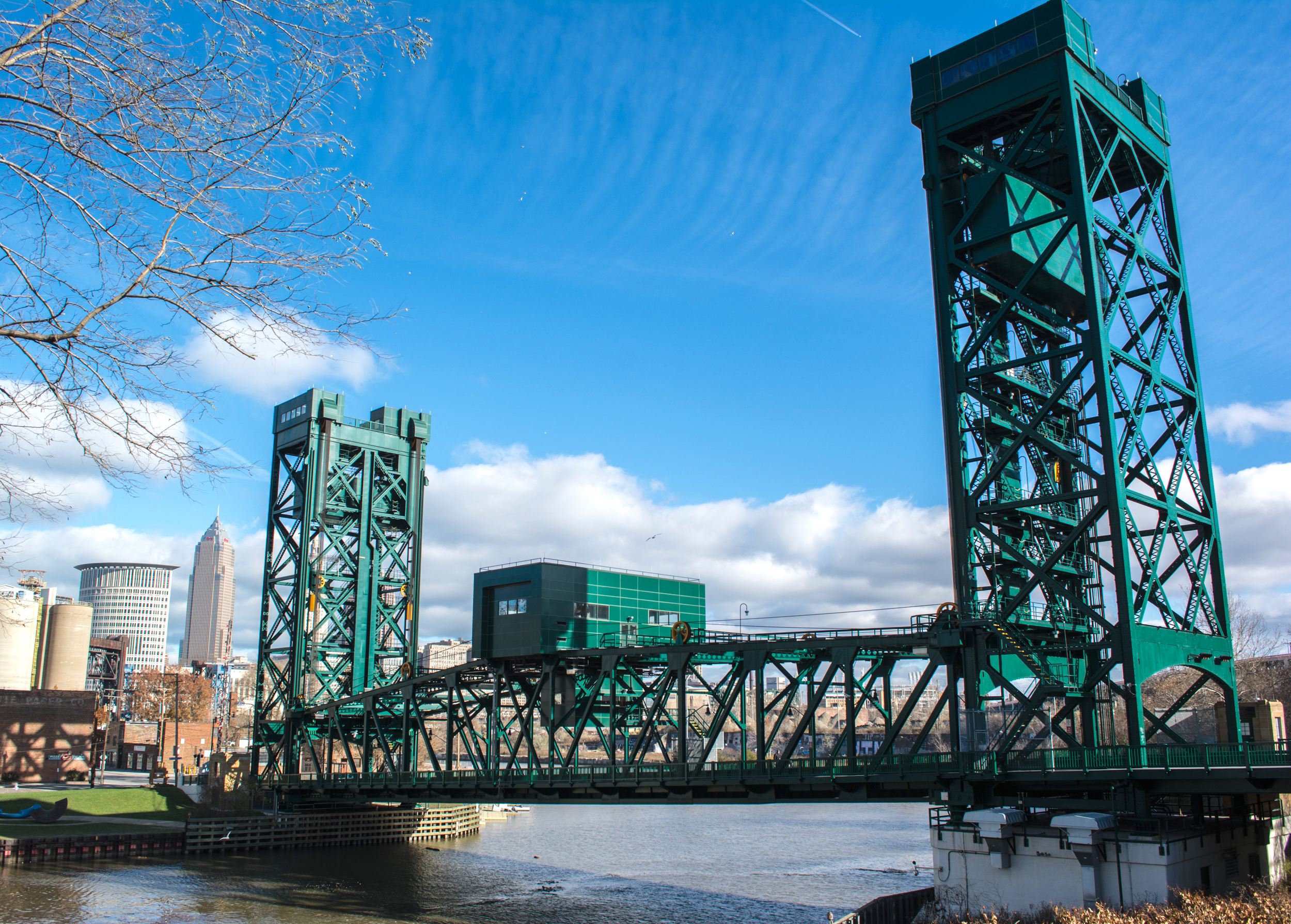
- View towards downtown Cleveland in 2017
- Coordinates: 41°29′18″N 81°42′01″W
- Carries: Columbus Road
- Crosses: Cuyahoga River
- Locale: Cleveland, Ohio
- Owner: Cuyahoga County
- Maintained by: Cuyahoga County
- ID number: 1833758

Characteristics
- Design: Pratt truss, vertical lift
- Total length: 347 feet (105.9 m)
- Width: 59 feet (17.9 m)
- Height: 150 feet (46 m)
- Longest span: 242 feet (73.7 m)
- Clearance above: 15.0 feet (4.57 m)
- Clearance below: 95 feet (29 m), raised

History
- Opened: June 1, 1940
- Rebuilt: May 2013–December 2014

Statistics
- Daily traffic: 3,580 (2025)

U.S. Historic district – Contributing property
- Designated: January 22, 2014
- Part of: Cleveland Centre Historic District
- Reference no.: 13001117

Location
- Interactive map of Columbus Road Bridge

The Columbus Road Bridge is vertical lift bridge over the Cuyahoga River in Cleveland, Ohio. It is one of several moveable bridges within the city, and is a contributing property to the Cleveland Centre Historic District. Columbus Road has been site of a bridge since 1835 when the first permanent river crossing in Cleveland was built. The current bridge opened in 1940 with a major refurbishment occurring from 2013 to 2014.

== Design and operation ==
The Columbus Road Bridge is located in downtown Cleveland in The Flats neighborhood 1.93 river miles (3.11 km) from the mouth of the Cuyahoga River. A vertical lift bridge, it is one of several movable bridges over the Cuyahoga in Cleveland. The bridge's mainspan consists of a 242-foot (73.7 m) Pratt truss flanked by 150-foot (46 m) lift towers. The bridge is owned and maintained by Cuyahoga County, but operated by the City of Cleveland. The operator's control room is situated in the middle of the bridge span above the road deck within the truss. The bridge's two 175-horsepower (130 kW) electric motors are housed in the machine room atop the truss. When raised, the Columbus Road Bridge has a clearance below the span of 95 feet (29 m). It received its characteristic green color during its 2013–2014 refurbishment.

The bridge opens on signal from marine traffic traversing the river, except from December 15 through March 31 when 12-hour advance notice is required. When the bridge operator signals the intent to open the bridge for marine traffic, the bridge's warning lights and bell are activated. Bar gates on the each approach descend, followed by a larger, locking gate. Before the Columbus Road Bridge was rebuilt in 2013, a cable net barrier was lowered to block the roadway. The bridge deck can be raised from its closed position to fully open in 90 seconds. As part of the city's preparation for potential malfunctions stemming from Y2K, the bridge was retrofitted to be able to lift by electrical generators or, if necessary, by air pressure.

== History ==
=== Predecessor bridges ===
Not long after Cleveland was settled in 1796, the Cuyahoga River was first spanned by a movable float bridge constructed of logs at the site of the Center Street Bridge. In 1833, Columbus Road was laid out by a group of developers, including future mayor of Cleveland John W. Willey, through what is now The Flats in 1833, and on the opposite side of the river to the Medina and Wooster turnpike, now West 25th Street. A bridge was constructed to join the two segments of Columbus Road in 1835 and was considered the "first substantial bridge across the Cuyahoga". The bridge cost $15,000 and incorporated three spans—two covered bridges with an exposed, center drawbridge.

The new bridge had the effect of attracting traffic away from Ohio City, on the west bank of the river, in favor of Cleveland. In addition, the Cleveland City Council directed that the float bridge at Center Street be removed. Residents of Ohio City, indignant over the bridge's removal and the attempt by Cleveland to bypass their town, held a meeting and declared the Columbus Road Bridge a public nuisance. The conflict was escalated when a group then proceeded to destroy the Ohio City end of the bridge, and the city of Cleveland called out its own militia. Ultimately it was decided that both bridges were to be retained with a permanent one built at Center Street.

Increases in traffic over the bridge forced the replacement of the original Columbus Road Bridge with a larger wooden bridge in 1846, which was replaced in 1870 with one of iron. That bridge was, in turn, replaced in 1895 with the world's first double-swing bridge at a cost of $80,000.

=== Construction ===
In 1929, the Cleveland city manager William R. Hopkins noted that several bends in the Cuyahoga River would have to be widened and straightened to relieve "pinch points" in the river for larger ships. Doing so would also require the replacement of the Columbus Road Bridge. The city of Cleveland was permitted in March 1938 to issue $3,075,000 in bonds for the river improvement efforts. By May 1939, contracts were awarded for the dredging to cut back the shoreline of the inner curve of Irishtown Bend with bids for the bridge replacement to be received in July. The 1895 swing bridge was closed to traffic on July 25, 1939 pending the removal of its trusses by "derrick scows". Cofferdams were installed in the river in early September to facilitate the construction of the bridge's two piers; mariners were advised to minimize propeller usage while passing the Columbus Road Bridge site to avoid damage to the cofferdams by the ship's wake. The same day as the notice was carried in The Plain Dealer, an iron ore-carrying lake freighter had to be towed after its propeller was fouled by a cable, the third incident of propeller damage to ships while passing the bridge site. On December 6, the north lift tower of Columbus Road Bridge was completed with construction of the south tower beginning. The lift span was being assembled by February 1940 and was being installed in March. The span was raised to top of the towers for the first time on April 1. The new Columbus Road Bridge was open by June 1, 1940 along with the Carter Road Bridge and West 3rd Street Bridge, which had been also under construction and were completed, by coincidence, at the same time.

=== Reconstruction ===
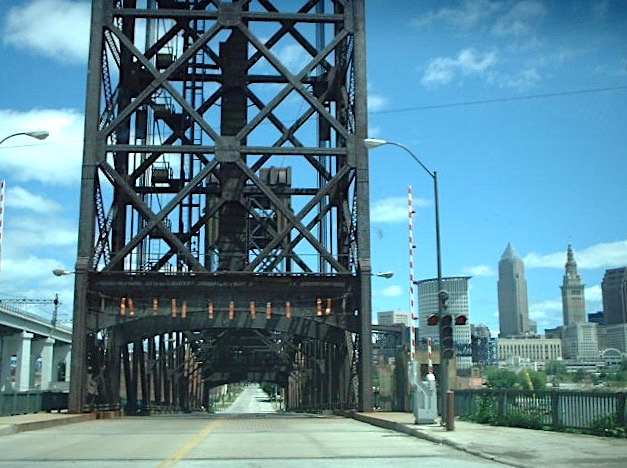
The Columbus Road Bridge in 2004, before it was rehabilitated

As early as the 1980s, the need to repair or replace the deteriorating Columbus Road Bridge was becoming apparent. Member of the Ohio House of Representatives Ike Thompson, who was advocating the need for bridge repair across the state, noted that on a visit to The Flats in January 1982, he found "wood beams propping up the Columbus Road bridge." All of Cleveland's moveable bridges were built to last only 50 years. While minor repairs and maintenance were carried out over the decades since the bridge's construction, larger repairs were deferred in 1970s due to lack of funding from the city leaving the Columbus Road Bridge a "rusting, time-blackened hulk" by 2008.

On May 29, 2013, the bridge was closed to traffic to effect a complete refurbishment of the bridge towers and replacement of the lift span. Eighty percent of the funding for the $34 million project came from the federal government with the remainder split between the city and Cuyahoga County. The old lift span was removed from the structure on June 11 and hauled to shore by barges operated by American Bridge Company to be dismantled and scrapped. The replacement span was constructed off-site near the Carter Road Bridge, and was barged into position over a year after the removal of the old one on July 29, 2014. The Columbus Road Bridge was reopened on December 31, 2014.

The Columbus Road Bridge was designated a contributing property to the Cleveland Centre Historic District on the National Register of Historic Places, along with several other bridges in downtown Cleveland that traverse The Flats, on January 22, 2014.

== See also ==
- List of bridges documented by the Historic American Engineering Record in Ohio
- List of crossings of the Cuyahoga River

== Sources ==
- Avery, Elroy McKendree (1918). "The Early Bridges of Cleveland". Bridges of Cleveland and Cuyahoga County. pp. 22–28.
- Darbee, Jeffrey; Recchie, Nancy (January 15, 2013). "Cleveland Centre Historic District" (PDF). National Register of Historic Places Registration Form. National Park Service.
- Gooden, Robert S. (Summer 1986). "Columbus Road Lift Bridge" (PDF). Historic American Engineering Record. Library of Congress.
- Watson, Sarah Ruth; Wolfs, John R. (1981). Bridges of Metropolitan Cleveland. Self-published.
