= Valley View Bridge =

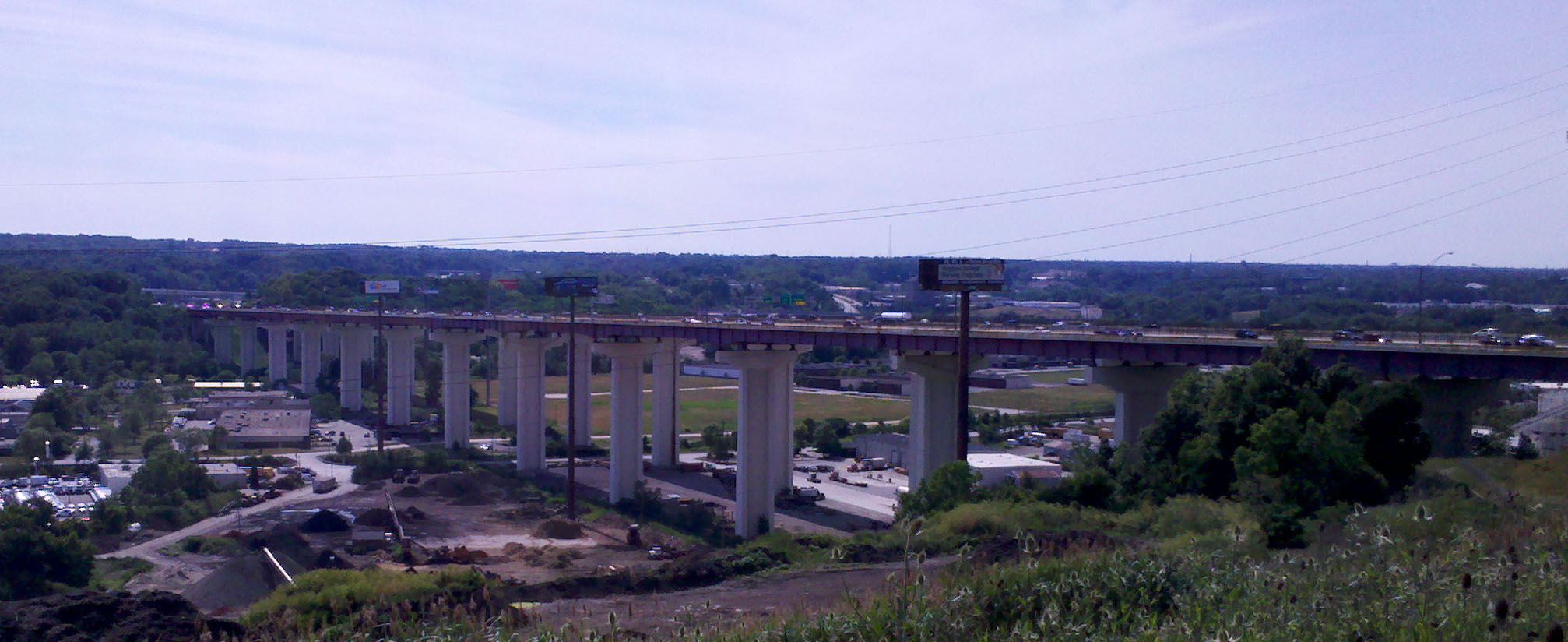
- Valley View Bridge as viewed from the east, 2012
- Coordinates: 41.408552°N 81.633843°W
- Carries: I-480
- Crosses: Cuyahoga River; Ohio and Erie Canal; Csx Rail Line; Canal Road; W. Canal Road; Ohio/Erie Towpath Trail
- Locale: Valley View and Independence, Cuyahoga County, Ohio
- Maintained by: Ohio Department of Transportation, District 12
- ID number: 1812521; 1812548

Characteristics
- Design: steel multi-stringer highway girder bridges
- Total length: 4,150 feet (1,260 m)
- Height: 215 feet (66 m)
- Longest span: 300 feet (91 m)

History
- Construction start: 1972 (outer spans), 2018 (middle span)
- Construction end: 1975 (outer spans), 2020 (middle span)
- Opened: 1977 (outer spans), 2020 (middle span)

Statistics
- Daily traffic: 180000

Location
- Location in Ohio

The Valley View Bridge is a trio of steel multi-stringer highway girder bridges that carry Interstate 480 over the Cuyahoga River valley in Valley View and Independence, Ohio. They are 215 feet (66 m) high and 4,150 feet (1,260 m) long.

== History ==
In 1971, construction of the Outerbelt South Freeway (I-480) began on both sides of the Cuyahoga River valley, in Valley View and Independence. To join the sections, two parallel bridge decks (one for westbound traffic and the other for eastbound traffic) were constructed. Each section consists of 93-foot (28 m) long beams connected by steel bolts, and the bridge supports are in concrete. The support pillars were completed within two years, and the decking within four years. The bridges opened in 1977 providing access to the nearby Willow Freeway (I-77).

In 1999, the Ohio Department of Transportation painted the bridge a red-primer color, replacing the original gray.

In 2010, the bridge received the honorary name "Union Workers Memorial Bridge".

In 2011, ODOT began a project to retrofit the bridge's parapets. The work includes installing new fences and moving the overhead lighting to the outside of the structures. The estimated cost of construction was $4.4 million.

In 2016, ODOT announced that a third bridge would be built in between the two outer bridges, which then would undergo extended repairs. The third bridge, which had been planned along with the other two bridges in the 1970s, was constructed from 2018 to 2020 and was retained after the bridge replacement phase ended in 2022, creating a bypass of the interchanges on each end of the bridge while functioning as express lanes. The ribbon cutting for the middle bridge occurred on June 12, 2023.

A pair of peregrine falcons nests under the bridge.

== Accidents ==
The city of Valley View has jurisdiction over the bridge, and they have been assisted by the police and fire departments from Garfield Heights and Independence.

- On February 17, 1986, a driver was rescued when his semi-truck partially left the bridge.
- In February 1996, a car fell from the bridge, killing the driver.
- In March 1997, police and the fire department responded to a dangling semi-truck. The driver was safely rescued.
- On February 22, 2011, a semi-truck driver was killed when his cab fell off the bridge.
- On June 25, 2013, during a severe storm, a couple of highway signs fell down hitting two cars and injuring one person.
- On December 14, 2017, while attempting to elude police, a man drove down the steep embankment that separates the two spans of the bridge.
- In March 2024, A fire broke out at a landscaping company located on Canal Road. The fire was started in a mulch bed that quickly grew sending flames and smoke straight up to the bridge during the morning rush hour.

== See also ==
- List of crossings of the Cuyahoga River
- List of bridges in the United States by height
