= Detroit–Superior Bridge =

Bridge in Cleveland, Ohio

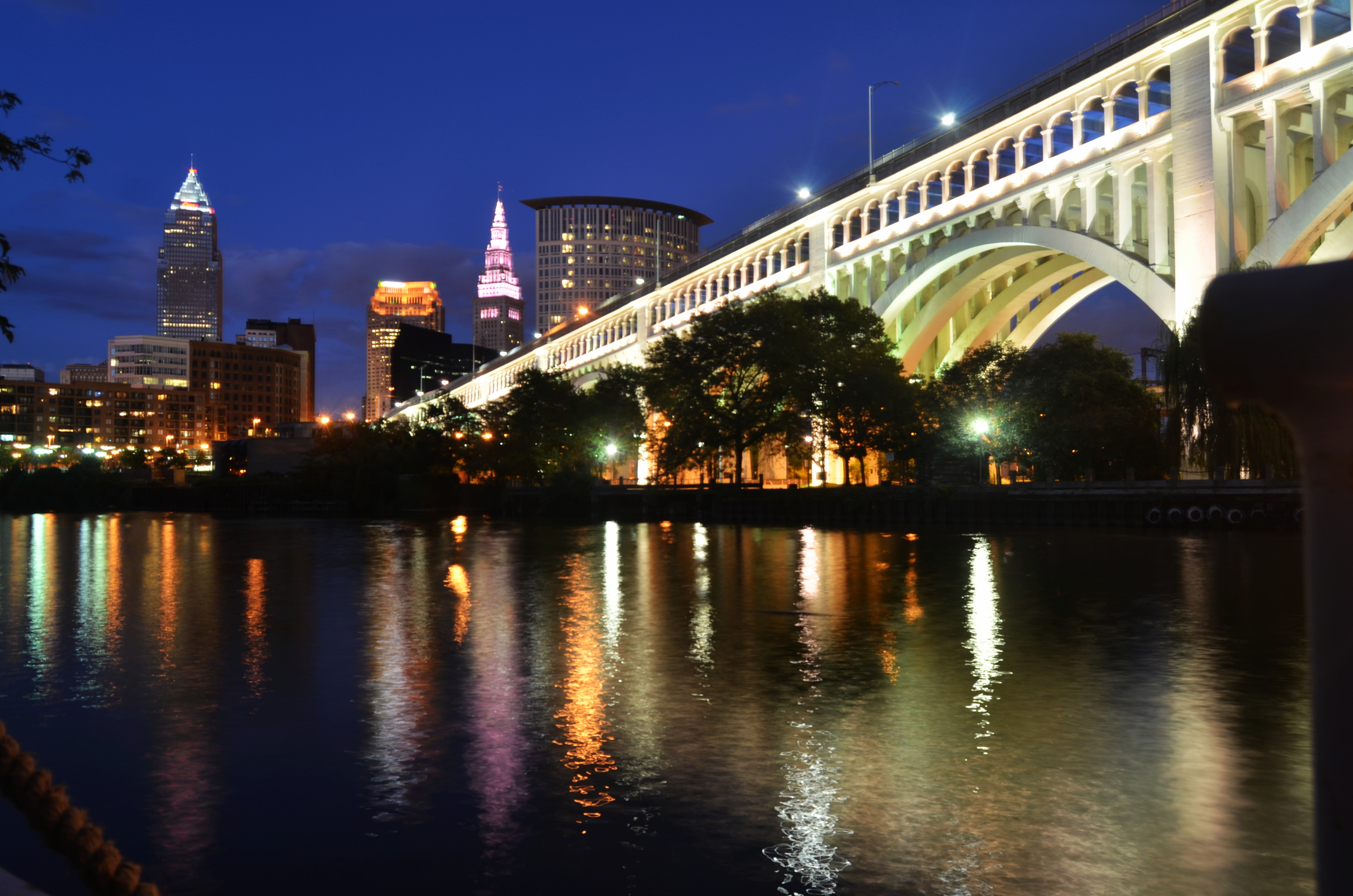
- The Detroit–Superior Bridge from west bank of the Flats
- Coordinates: 41.493843°N 81.70365°W
- Carries: US 6 / US 20 / US 42 / SR 3 USBR 30
- Crosses: Cuyahoga River
- Locale: Cleveland, Ohio
- ID number: 1800930

Characteristics
- Design: Through arch bridge
- Total length: 3,112 feet (949 m)
- Height: 196 feet (60 m)
- Longest span: 620 feet (190 m)
- Clearance below: 96 feet (29 m)

History
- Construction start: 1914
- Construction end: 1917
- Opened: 1918
- Detroit-Superior High Level Bridge
- U.S. National Register of Historic Places
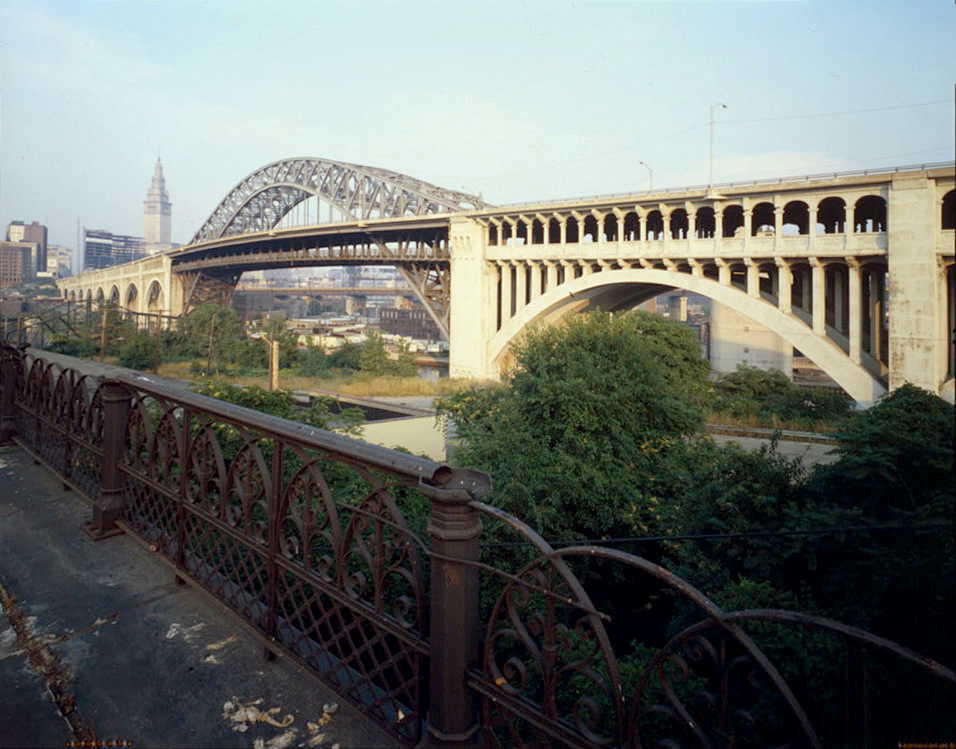
- The Detroit-Superior Bridge in 1978

- Location within Cleveland Location within Ohio Location within the United States
- Location: Over Cuyahoga River Valley, between Detroit Ave. and Superior Ave., Cleveland, Ohio
- Coordinates: 41°29′39″N 81°42′9″W
- Area: 5.4 acres (2.2 ha)
- Built: 1917
- Architects: Lea, A. B.; Lander, Frank R.
- Architectural style: Double-deck bridge
- NRHP reference No.: 74001437
- Added to NRHP: January 18, 1974

Location
- Interactive map of Detroit–Superior Bridge

The Detroit–Superior Bridge or Detroit–Superior High Level Bridge (officially known as the Veterans Memorial Bridge) is a 3,112-foot-long (949 m) through arch bridge over the Cuyahoga River in Cleveland, Ohio. The bridge links Detroit Avenue on Cleveland's west side and Superior Avenue on Cleveland's east side, terminating west of Public Square. Construction by the King Bridge Company began in 1914 and completed in 1918, at a cost of $5.4 million. It was the first fixed high level bridge in Cleveland, and the third high-level bridge above the Cuyahoga (the first was the Old Superior Viaduct and the second the Central Viaduct, also built by the King Company). At the time of its completion, the bridge was the largest steel and concrete reinforced bridge in the world.

== Specifications ==
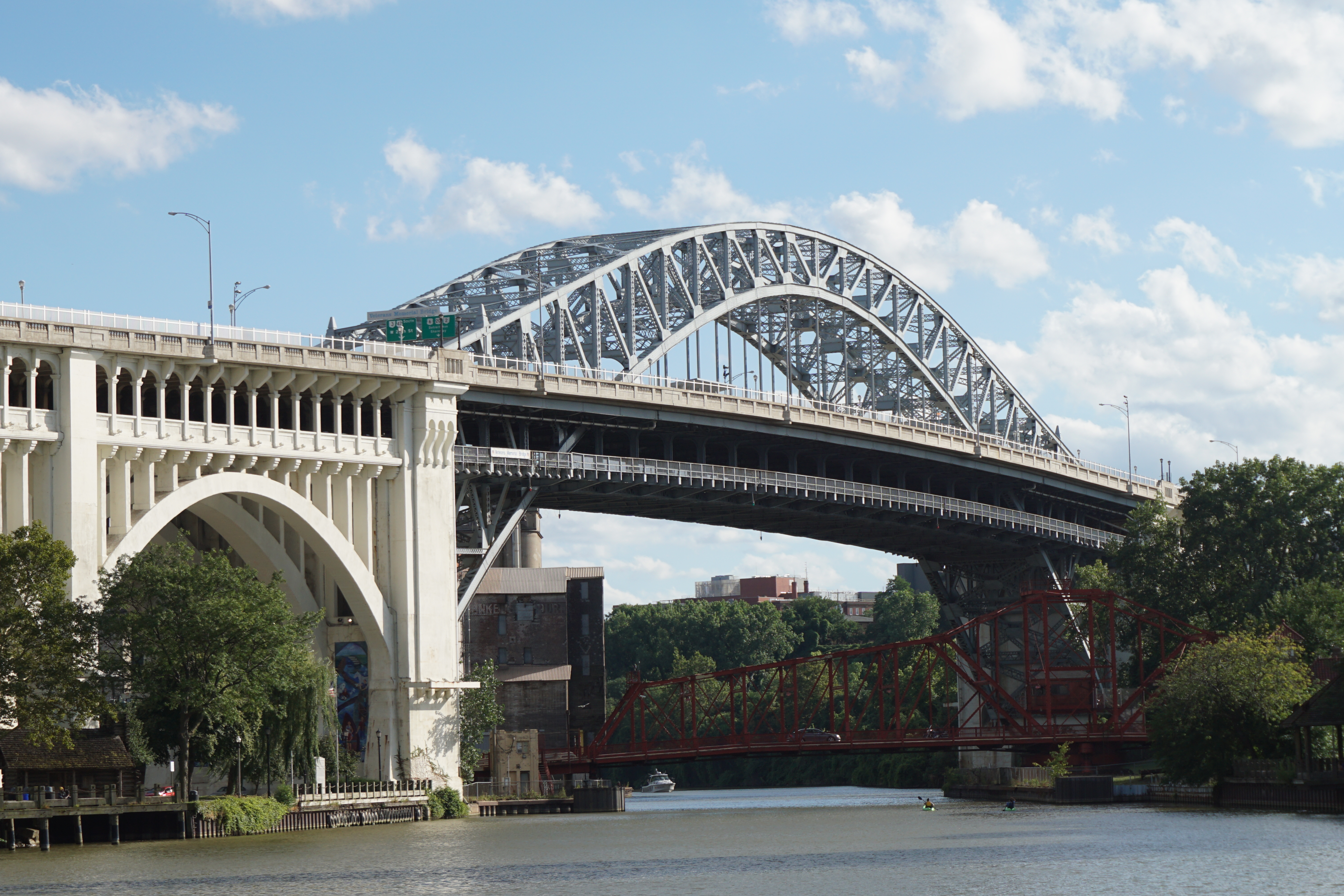
The Detroit–Superior Bridge in August 2015

The High Level Bridge starts on the east at the center line of West 9th Street and Superior, and extends across the Cuyahoga Valley to the junction of West 25th Street and Detroit Avenue. It is 3,112 feet (949 m) long. The total cost, including the land and a right of way, was $5,407,000, split as $1,687,200 was for land and $3,719,800 for the superstructure.

The bridge has 96 feet (29 m) of clearance above the river, and rises to 196 feet (60 m) above the river at the peak of the central span. The original construction included a main deck 75 feet (23 m) wide, with two 15 feet (4.6 m) sidewalks and a 45 feet (14 m) roadway. While the bridge's upper level is for road traffic, the lower level was intended for streetcars. It was built with four sets of these tracks, leaving room for two more, if needed.

The structure includes 12 concrete arches and one steel span. The steel span is 591 feet (180 m) long and crosses the Cuyahoga River. The steel span cost $646,747. About 2,123,300 cubic yards (1,623,400 m^{3}) of concrete and 9,385,000 pounds (4,257,000 kg) of reinforcing steel were used in the construction of the arches. The concrete piles used in the foundation work, if placed end to end, would extend a distance of 28 miles (45 km). Each end of the structure has underground streetcar stations for the trams that operated on the lower deck.

== Subway ==
The Detroit–Superior subway was an underground transit system that operated between 1917 until its closure January 24, 1954. The line served riders between Cleveland's west side and downtown. The system had two stations: West 25th (four platforms) and West 9th (two platforms), which included restrooms. The line ran on the lower level of the Detroit–Superior Bridge.

=== Gallery ===
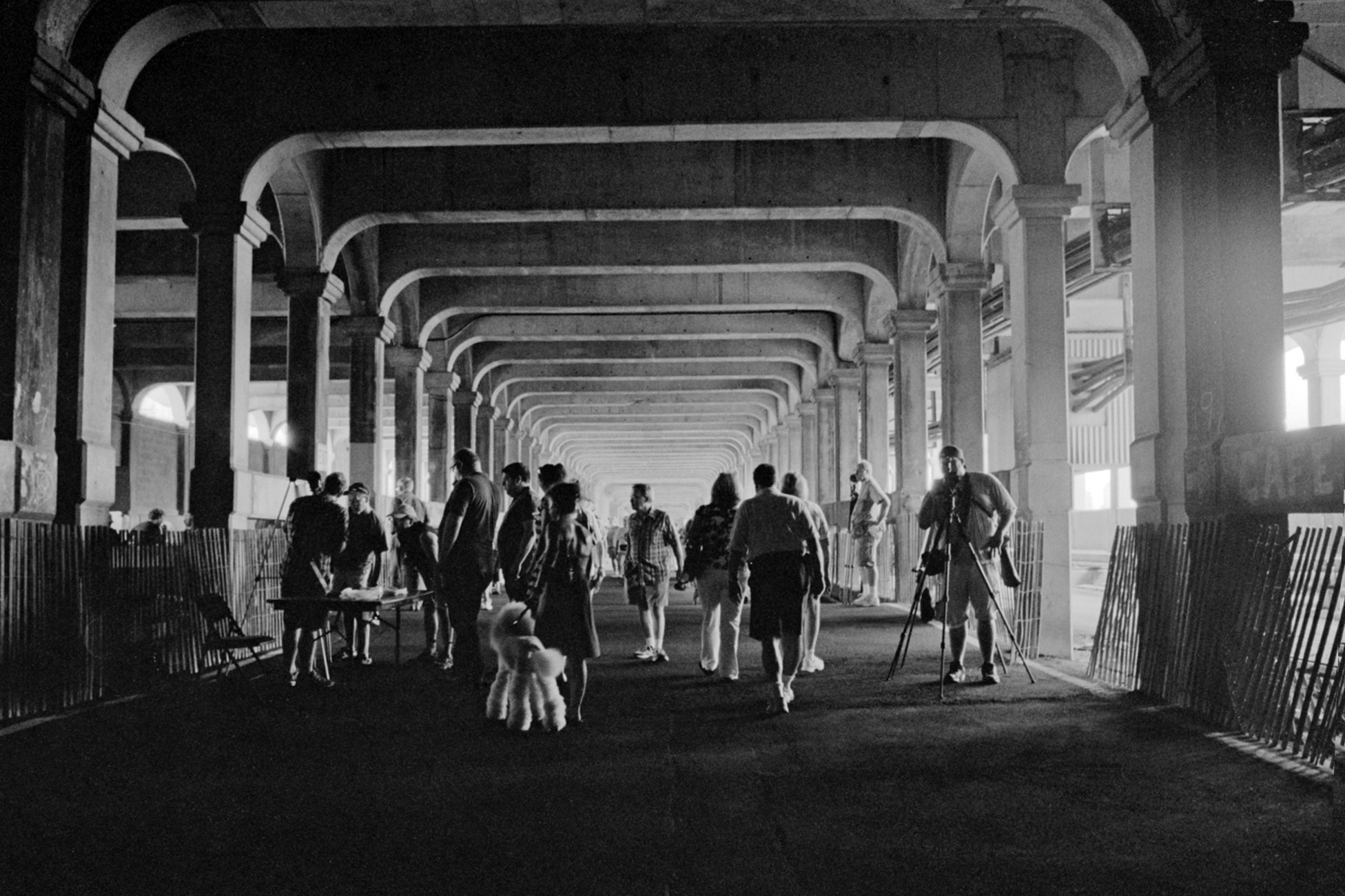
Detroit–Superior Bridge in Cleveland

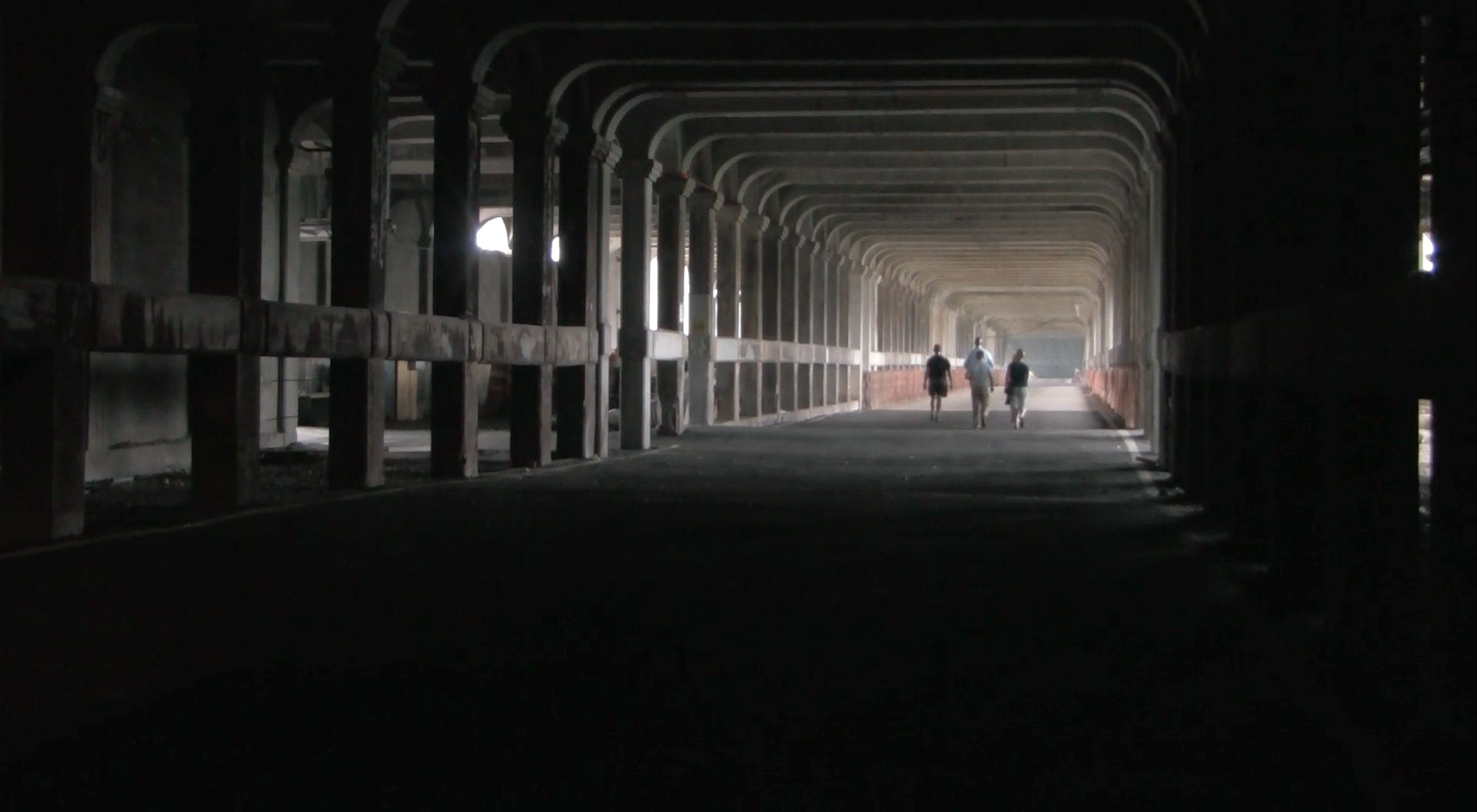
Video still from under the Detroit Superior Bridge

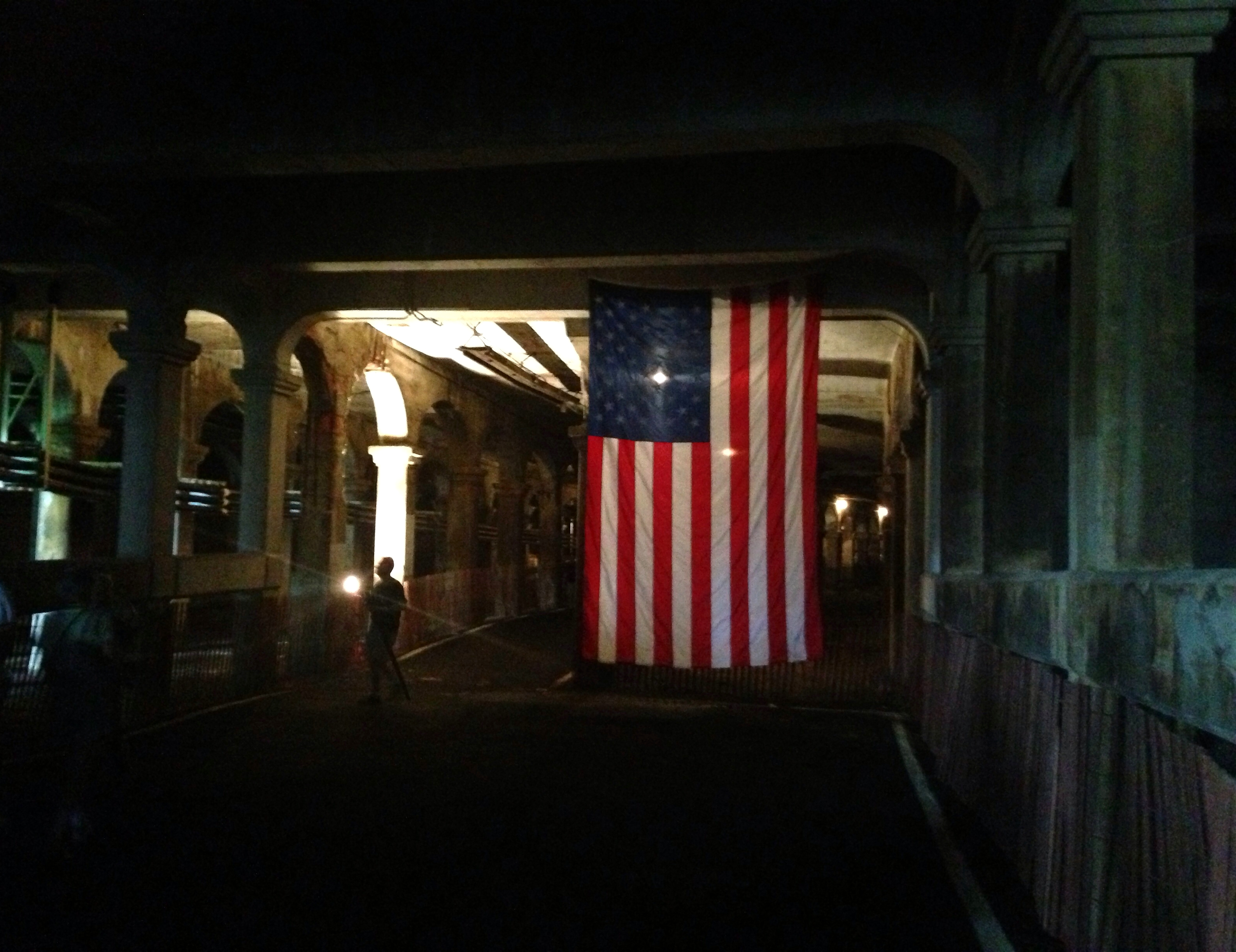
Cleveland Veterans Memorial Bridge Subway

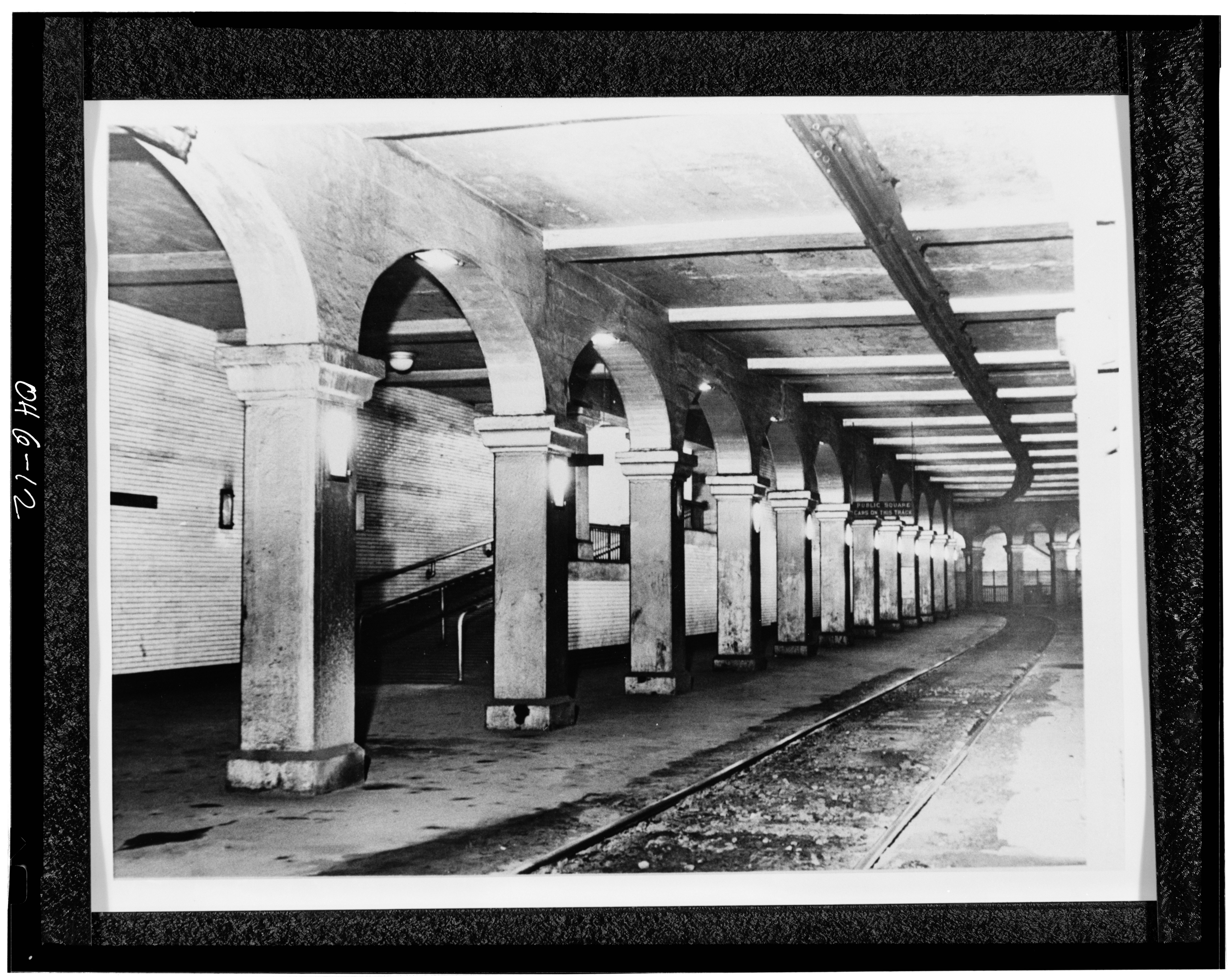
West 25th station in 1939

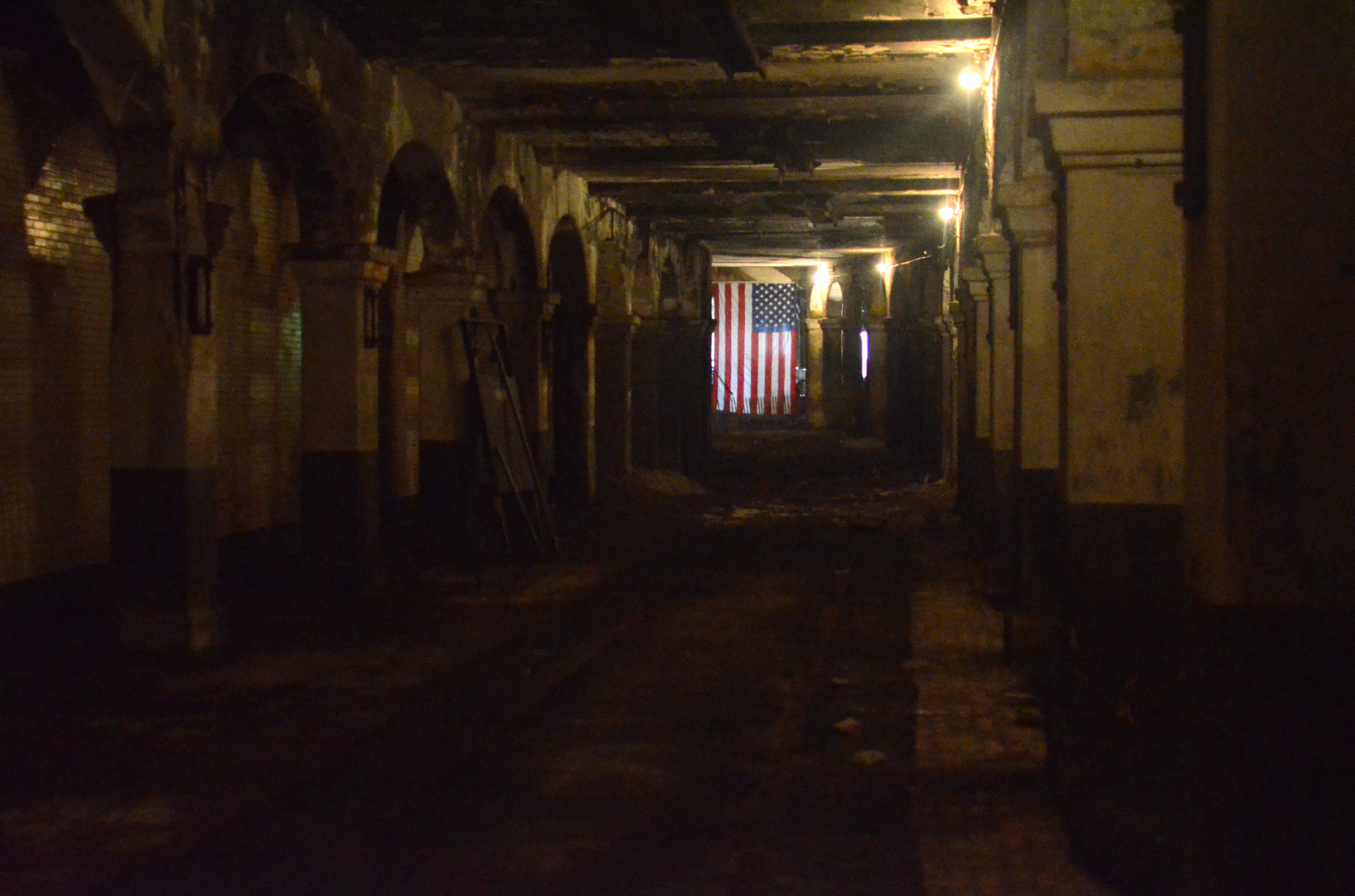
West 25th station in 2013

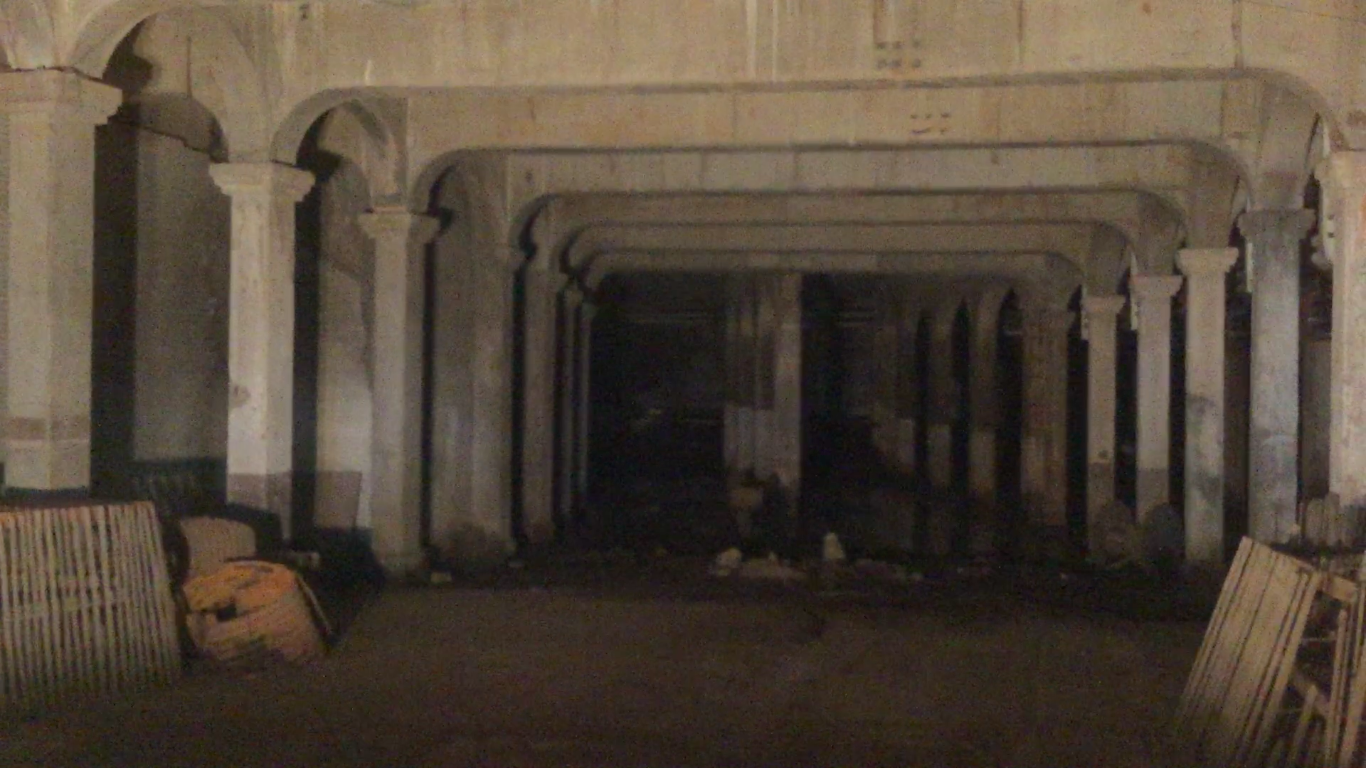
West 9th station (approximate spot) in 2017

Art installation in 2019

== Modifications ==
Due to the closure of the streetcar operations, the subway level became unused. In November 1955, ramps to the lower level were closed. The Detroit–Superior Bridge remained a bottleneck during rush hour. A two-year renovation completed in May 1969 added two traffic lanes by narrowing existing sidewalks from 15 to 5 feet (4.5 to 1.5 meters) and cantilevering the new lanes outside the central arch.

On November 11, 1989 (Veterans Day), the bridge was renamed the Veterans Memorial Bridge. It was added to the National Register of Historic Places on January 18, 1974.

In 2003, Cuyahoga County Commissioners approved the conversion of the two outside traffic lanes for pedestrian and bicycle use. The lower level and subway station are opened to the public for tours a few times per year, typically around Memorial Day, Labor Day, and for the Cleveland Ingenuity Festival. Self-guided tours are free of charge.

== See also ==
- List of bridges documented by the Historic American Engineering Record in Ohio
- Hope Memorial Bridge
- List of crossings of the Cuyahoga River
- Cincinnati Subway
- Rochester subway
