= Center Street Bridge (Cleveland) =

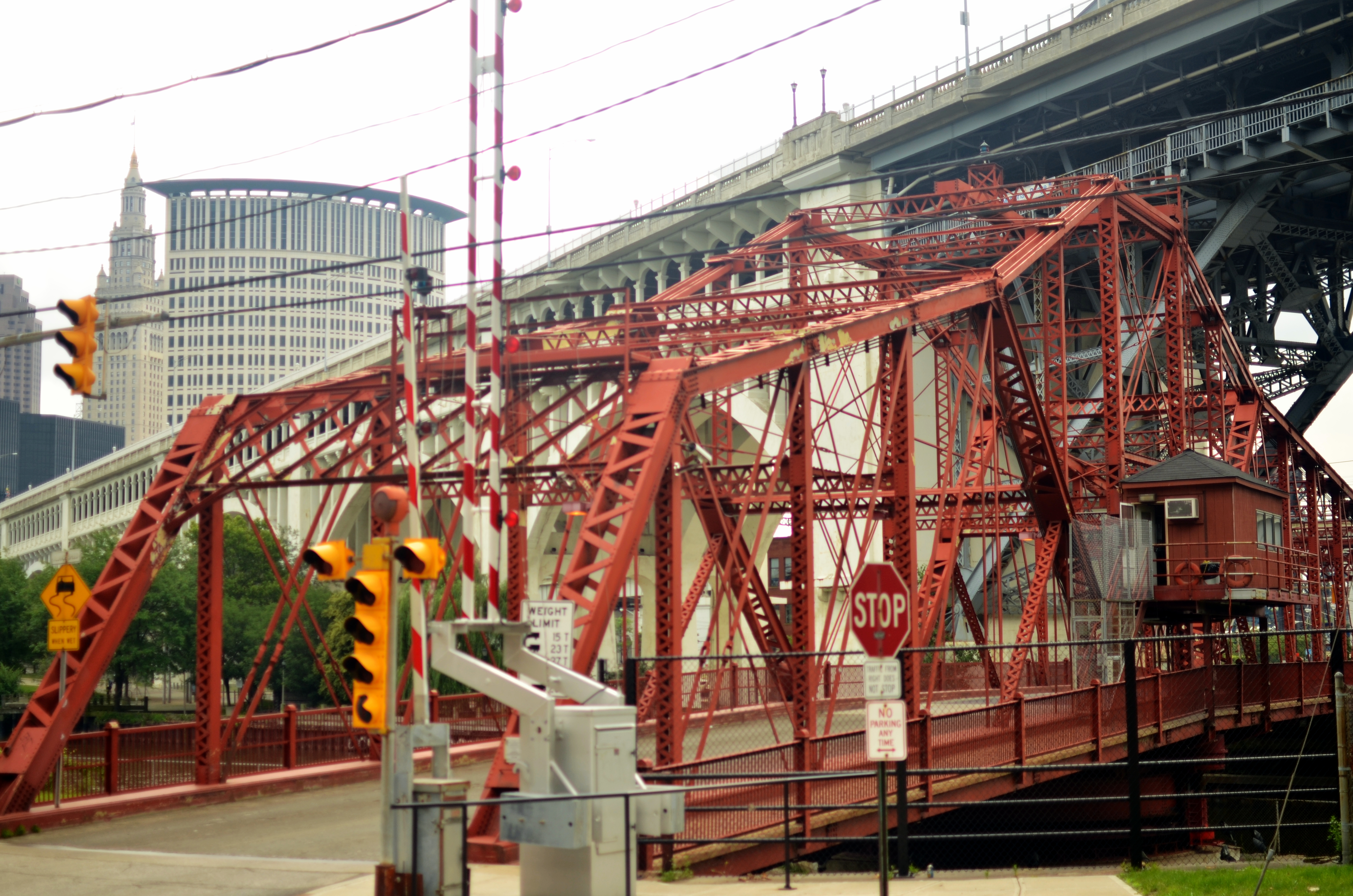
- View from the west bank in 2013
- Coordinates: 41°29′40″N 81°42′12″W
- Carries: Center Street
- Crosses: Cuyahoga River
- Locale: Cleveland, Ohio
- Owner: City of Cleveland
- Maintained by: City of Cleveland
- ID number: 1869345

Characteristics
- Design: Pratt truss, swing
- Total length: 314 feet (95.6 m)
- Width: 40 feet (12.2 m)
- Longest span: 145 feet (44.2 m)
- Clearance above: 15.0 feet (4.57 m)

History
- Opened: 1901
- Rebuilt: 2023

Statistics
- Daily traffic: 3,176 (2025)

U.S. Historic district – Contributing property
- Designated: January 22, 2014
- Part of: Cleveland Centre Historic District
- Reference no.: 13001117

Location
- Interactive map of Center Street Bridge

The Center Street Bridge is a swing bridge over the Cuyahoga River in Cleveland, Ohio. It is one of several moveable bridges within the city, and is a contributing property to the Cleveland Centre Historic District.

== Design and operation ==
The Center Street Bridge is located in downtown Cleveland in The Flats neighborhood 1.28 river miles (2.06 km) from the mouth of the Cuyahoga River. As a swing bridge, it is one of several movable bridges over the Cuyahoga in Cleveland. The east approach of the bridge sits underneath the larger Detroit–Superior Bridge.

The bridge opens on signal from marine traffic traversing the river, except from December 15 through March 31 when 12-hour advance notice is required. When the bridge operator signals the intent to open the bridge for marine traffic, the bridge's warning lights and bell are activated. Bar gates on each approach descend, followed by a larger, locking gate. The Center Street Bridge can swing open in either the upstream or downstream direction, depending on the direction of the traffic. The bridge always opens towards the oncoming ship to allow it to begin closing before the channel is fully cleared to shorten the disruption to road traffic.

== History ==
=== Predecessor bridges ===
Not long after Cleveland was settled in 1796, the Cuyahoga River was first spanned by a moveable float bridge constructed of logs at the future site of the Center Street Bridge. In 1833, another road was laid out by a group of developers, including future mayor of Cleveland John W. Willey, from Cleveland through what is now The Flats, and on the opposite side of the river to the Medina and Wooster turnpike, now West 25th Street. A predecessor to the modern-day Columbus Road Bridge was constructed to join the two segments of the road in 1835. The new bridge had the effect of attracting traffic away from Ohio City, on the west bank of the river, in favor of Cleveland. In addition, the Cleveland City Council directed that the float bridge at Center Street be removed. Residents of Ohio City, indignant over the bridge's removal and the attempt by Cleveland to bypass their town, held a meeting and declared the new bridge a public nuisance. The conflict was escalated when a group then proceeded to destroy the Ohio City end of the Columbus Road Bridge, and the city of Cleveland called out its own militia. Ultimately it was decided that both bridges were to be retained with a permanent one built at Center Street.

== See also ==
- List of bridges documented by the Historic American Engineering Record in Ohio
- List of crossings of the Cuyahoga River

== Sources ==
- Avery, Elroy McKendree (1918). "The Early Bridges of Cleveland". Bridges of Cleveland and Cuyahoga County. pp. 22–28.
- Darbee, Jeffrey; Recchie, Nancy (January 15, 2013). "Cleveland Centre Historic District" (PDF). National Register of Historic Places Registration Form. National Park Service.
- Miller, Carol Poh (September 1978). "Center Street Bridge" (PDF). Historic American Engineering Record. Library of Congress.
- Watson, Sarah Ruth; Wolfs, John R. (1981). Bridges of Metropolitan Cleveland. Self-published.
