= Cuyahoga River Bridge 1 =

Cuyahoga River Bridge #1
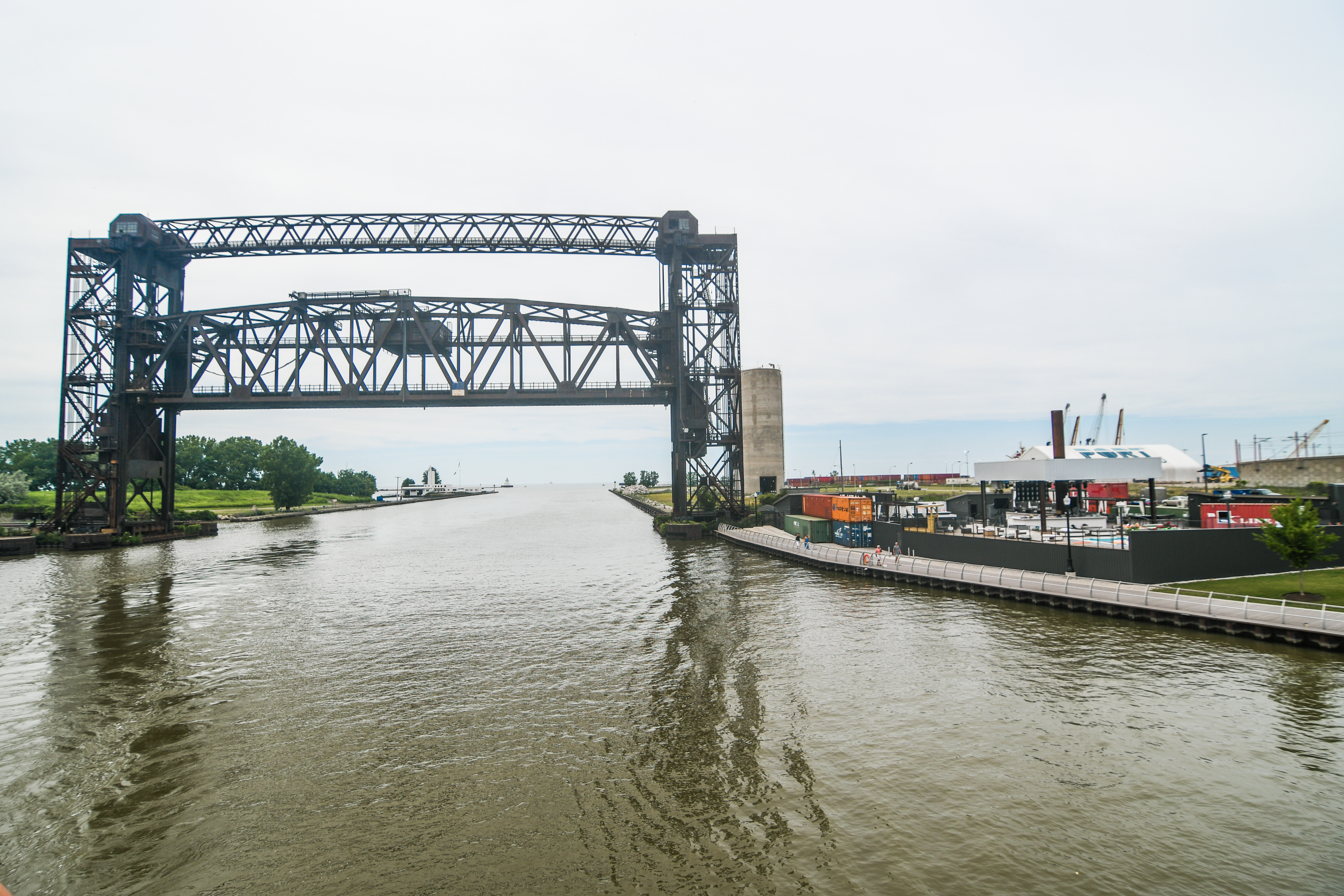
- Viewed from the southeast, from on the river
- Coordinates: 41.5000°N 81.7091°W
- Carries: 2 railroad tracks
- Crosses: Cuyahoga River
- Locale: Cleveland, Ohio
- Official name: Cuyahoga River Bridge #1
- Other name(s): First Flats Rail Bridge (former)

Characteristics
- Design: Through truss vertical-lift bridge
- Material: Steel

History
- Opened: 1957
- Closed: Never

Cuyahoga River Bridge #1, also known as the Iron Curtain Bridge and previously known as the First Flats Rail Bridge, is a railroad bridge lift bridge that crosses the Cuyahoga River in Cleveland, Ohio, United States. The bridge gets its "number 1" name from the fact that it is the farthest downstream crossing of the Cuyahoga River proper before it empties into Lake Erie (the only other crossing is the Old River Bridge, which crosses the former course of the Cuyahoga). The bridge is of similar design to many of the other railroad bridges in the Cleveland area.

Mariners navigating the Cuyahoga River can contact the bridge operator on marine channel 16 (156.8 MHz) callsign NS1 (Norfolk Southern 1).

== See also ==
- List of crossings of the Cuyahoga River
