= Innerbelt Bridge =

Former truss arch bridge in Cleveland, Ohio

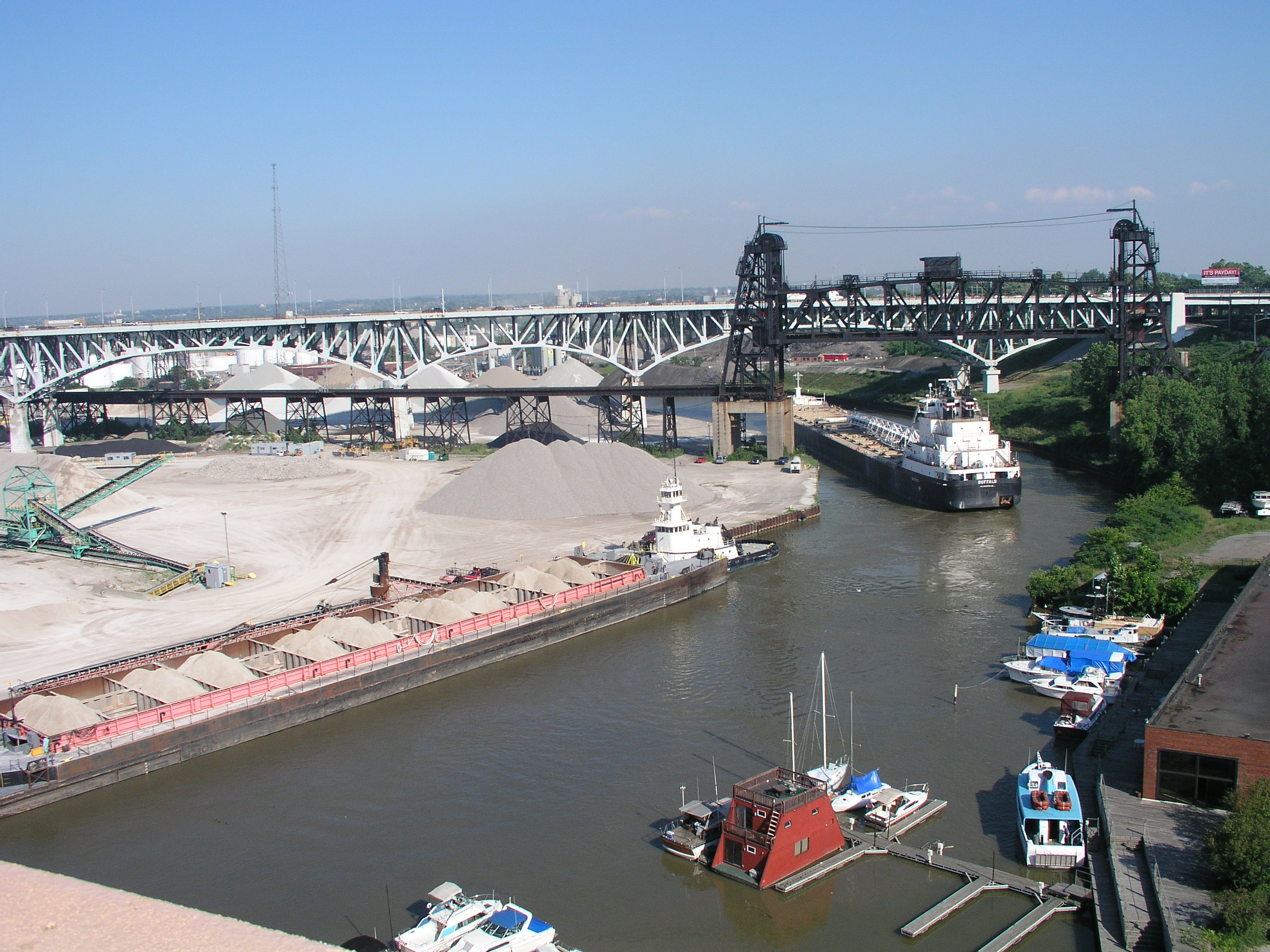
- The Innerbelt Bridge carried traffic over The Flats and the Cuyahoga River (2005)
- Coordinates: 41.4861°N 81.6900°W
- Carries: I-90 (Innerbelt Freeway)
- Crosses: Cuyahoga River; US 422 / SR 8 / SR 14 / SR 43 / SR 87 (Ontario Street/Broadway Avenue) RTA Rapid Transit Red Line Norfolk Southern Railway
- Locale: Cleveland, Ohio
- Owner: Ohio Department of Transportation (ODOT)
- Maintained by: ODOT

Characteristics
- Design: Cantilever truss arch
- Material: Steel, concrete
- Total length: 4,233 feet (1,290 m)
- Width: 116.25 feet (35.43 m)
- No. of spans: 7

History
- Engineering design by: Howard, Needles, Tammen and Bergendoff
- Construction start: December 12, 1954
- Construction cost: $26,066,000
- Opened: August 15, 1959
- Closed: November 22, 2013
- Replaces: Central Viaduct

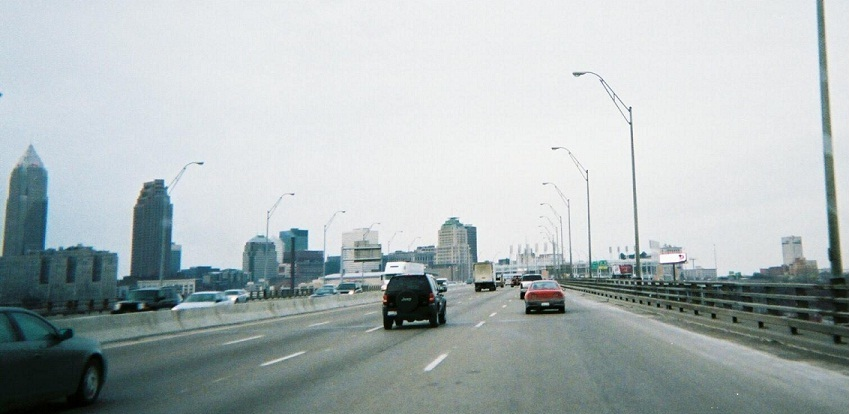
On the bridge deck in 2006, looking north

The Innerbelt Bridge was a truss arch bridge in Cleveland, Ohio carrying Interstate 90/Innerbelt Freeway over the Cuyahoga River.

== History ==
The bridge, completed in 1959, was 4,233 feet (1,290 m) in length and 116.25 feet (35.43 m) in width, built as the widest bridge in Ohio. The Innerbelt Bridge replaced the Central Viaduct.

The bridge had been intended to carry Interstate 71, but due to the lack of completion of a highway, carried Interstate 90 instead.

On November 13, 2008, all commercial truck traffic was banned from the bridge because it was deemed structurally deficient after a review of a computer analysis. This had been rectified by mid-2010.

=== Replacement ===
As part of the Innerbelt Freeway rebuild, the bridge was replaced by the George V. Voinovich Bridges. The Innerbelt Bridge was vacated in November 2013 after the completion of the westbound Voinovich bridge, built immediately to the north. Dismantling of the Innerbelt Bridge began January 13, 2014, and five of the nine remaining spans were imploded at dawn on July 12 with the remainder of the structure removed in the following weeks. The eastbound Voinovich bridge, built in the former location of the Innerbelt Bridge, opened in September 2016.

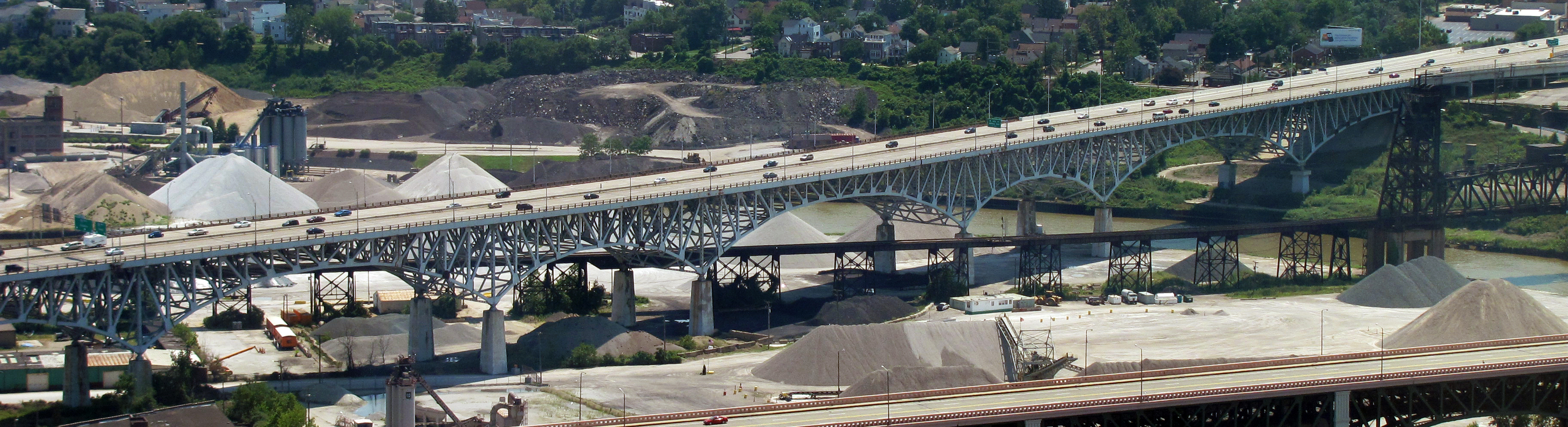
The Innerbelt Bridge, as seen from downtown Cleveland in 2010

== See also ==
- List of crossings of the Cuyahoga River
