= George V. Voinovich Bridges =

Bridges on Interstate 90 in Cleveland, Ohio, United States

George V. Voinovich Bridge westbound
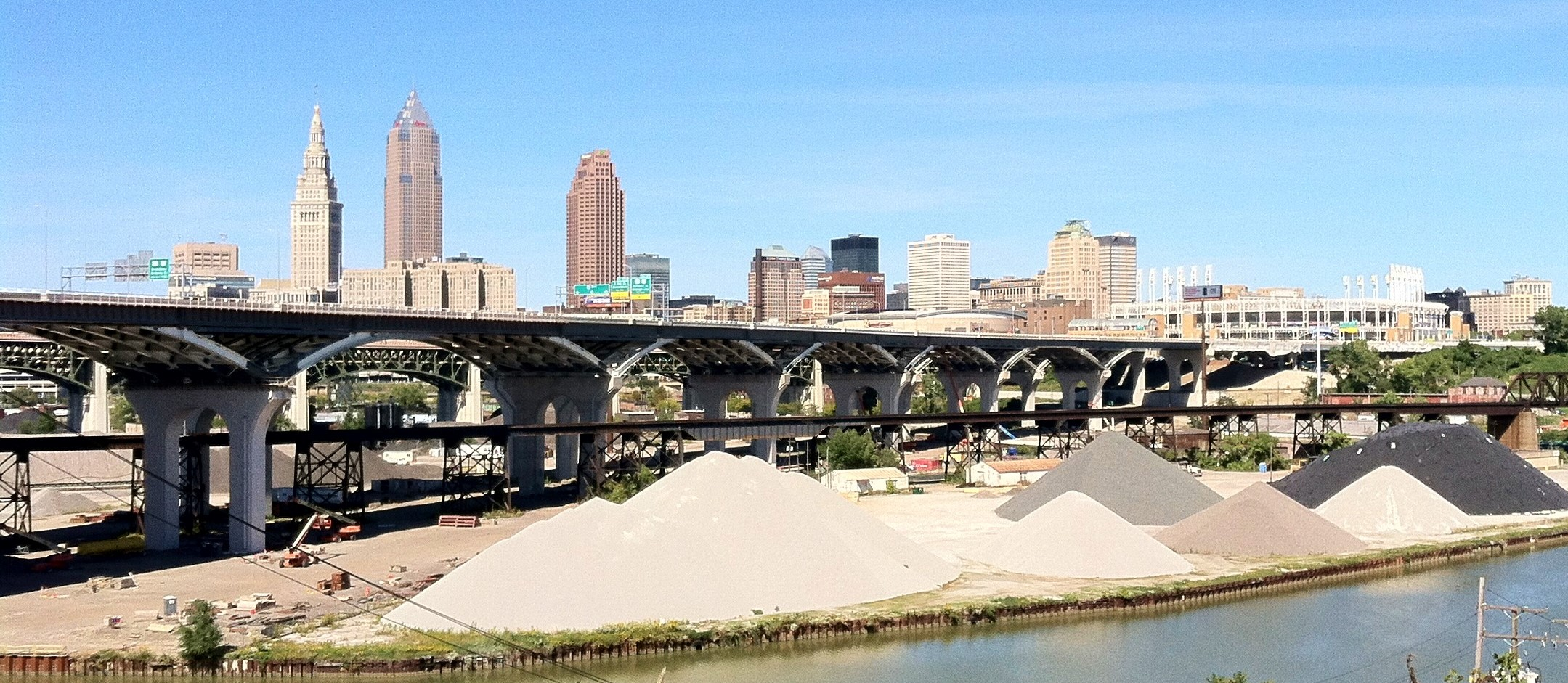
- The eastbound bridge, shortly after completion, September 2016
- Coordinates: 41.4861°N 81.69°W
- Carries: I-90 (Innerbelt Freeway)
- Crosses: US 422 / SR 8 / SR 10 / SR 14 / SR 43 / SR 87 (Ontario Street/Broadway Avenue) RTA Rapid Transit Red Line; Cuyahoga River Norfolk Southern Railway
- Locale: Cleveland, Ohio
- Owner: ODOT
- Maintained by: ODOT

Characteristics
- Material: Steel, concrete
- Total length: 4,347 feet (1,325 m)
- Height: 136 feet (41 m)

History
- Designer: HNTB Ohio
- Engineering design by: Walsh Construction
- Construction start: March 30, 2011
- Construction cost: $293 million
- Opened: November 9, 2013
- Inaugurated: November 8, 2013
- Replaces: Innerbelt Bridge

Location
- Interactive map of George V. Voinovich Bridge westbound

George V. Voinovich Bridge eastbound
- Coordinates: 41°29′N 81°41′W
- Carries: I-90
- Crosses: Norfolk Southern Railway Cuyahoga River; RTA Rapid Transit Red Line US 422 / SR 8 / SR 10 / SR 14 / SR 43 / SR 87 (Ontario Street/Broadway Avenue)
- Locale: Cleveland, Ohio
- Owner: ODOT
- Maintained by: ODOT

Characteristics
- Total length: 3,918 feet (1,194 m)
- Height: 136 feet (41 m)

History
- Designer: URS Corporation
- Engineering design by: Trumbull Corporation, The Great Lakes Construction Company, & The Ruhlin Company (TGR)
- Construction cost: $273 million
- Opened: September 24, 2016
- Inaugurated: September 24, 2016
- Replaces: Innerbelt Bridge

Location
- Interactive map of George V. Voinovich Bridge eastbound

The George V. Voinovich Bridges are two bridges in Cleveland, Ohio, U.S., that carry Interstate 90 (I-90, Innerbelt Freeway) over the Cuyahoga River. They are named for George Voinovich, former mayor of Cleveland, governor of Ohio, and United States senator.

The bridges' 200-foot (61 m) piles are the largest ever manufactured in the United States. Combined the bridges cost $566 million.

== Predecessor ==
The bridges were conceived as part of the Innerbelt Freeway rebuild to replace the 1959 Innerbelt Bridge, and the schedule of the project to build them was accelerated due to the deteriorating condition of the Innerbelt Bridge.

== Westbound bridge ==
The westbound bridge was built immediately to the north of the Innerbelt Bridge. Construction on this bridge began on March 30, 2011, with a ceremonial groundbreaking following on May 2. It opened to Ontario Street ramp traffic on November 9, 2013, had opened to other ramp traffic and I-90 westbound mainline traffic by November 17, and opened to eastbound traffic, which used the westbound bridge until the completion of the eastbound bridge, on November 23. The bridge was dedicated to George Voinovich during the ribbon-cutting ceremony on November 8, 2013.

== Eastbound bridge ==
The eastbound bridge was built in the former location of the Innerbelt Bridge. Early in the project, the proposed date of completion varied widely. Construction on the bridge had begun by November 3, 2014; the bridge opened in limited capacity the evening of September 24, 2016 after a ribbon-cutting ceremony earlier in the day, opening in full on October 24. This bridge was named for George Voinovich prior to the naming of the westbound bridge.

== See also ==
- List of crossings of the Cuyahoga River
