= List of crossings of the Cuyahoga River =

This is a list of bridges and other crossings of the Cuyahoga River from its mouth at Lake Erie upstream to its source at Burton, Ohio. The list includes current road and rail crossings, as well as various other crossings of the river.

All locations are in the U.S. state of Ohio.

== Crossings ==
Mouth at 41°30′13″N 81°42′44″W, elevation: 571 feet (174.0 m) at Lake Erie
in Cleveland.

RM (Note: RM stands for "River Mile" and refers to the method used by federal and state government agencies to identify locations along a water body. Mileage is defined as the lineal distance from the downstream terminus (i.e., mouth) and moving in an upstream direction.)	ID#	Crossing	Carries	Location	Built	Coordinates
0.76		Cuyahoga River Bridge 1	Norfolk Southern	Cleveland, Cuyahoga County	1954–1957 (Note: The bridge informally opened to railroad traffic on March 5, 1957. However, the bridge did not lift until April 1, 1957, the date the railroad marked as its completion.)	41.499998°N 81.708972°W
	1800035	Main Avenue Bridge	SR 2 (Cleveland Memorial Shoreway)	Cleveland, Cuyahoga County	1938–1939	41.498697°N 81.705249°W
		Main Avenue bridge (removed)	former Main Avenue	Cleveland, Cuyahoga County		
		Baltimore and Ohio Railroad Bridge 463 (closed)	former Baltimore and Ohio Railroad bridge near Riverbed Street and Sycamore Street	Cleveland, Cuyahoga County	1957	41.495930°N 81.702688°W
		Superior Viaduct drawspan (removed)	former Superior Avenue–Detroit Avenue	Cleveland, Cuyahoga County	1875–1878	
1.28	1869345	Center Street Bridge	Center Street	Cleveland, Cuyahoga County	1900	41.494317°N 81.703296°W
	1800930	Detroit–Superior Bridge	US 6 / US 20 / US 42 / SR 3	Cleveland, Cuyahoga County	1912–1917	41.493843°N 81.70365°W
		Cuyahoga Viaduct	GCRTA Red Line	Cleveland, Cuyahoga County	1929	41.48833°N 81.701483°W
1.93	1833758	Columbus Road Bridge	Cuyahoga CR-356 Columbus Road	Cleveland, Cuyahoga County	1835; 1846; 1870; 1895; 1939–1940, rebuilt 2013–2014	41.488314°N 81.700399°W
2.24		Flats Industrial Railroad Bridge	Flats Industrial Railroad	Cleveland, Cuyahoga County	1953	41.492107°N 81.699606°W
		Old River Road railroad lift bridge	unused railroad	Cleveland, Cuyahoga County		41.494317°N 81.698007°W
		Old River Road Bridge	Old River Road	Cleveland, Cuyahoga County		41.494317°N 81.698007°W
2.43	1869264	Carter Road Bridge	Carter Road	Cleveland, Cuyahoga County	1940	41.493313°N 81.692213°W
		Eagle Avenue Bridge	Eagle Avenue	Cleveland, Cuyahoga County	1931; bridge abandoned in raised position 2005 and connecting roadway removed; expected demolition 2026	41.493296°N 81.6933683°W
	1801503	Hope Memorial Bridge	SR 10 (Carnegie Avenue/Lorain Avenue)	Cleveland, Cuyahoga County	1927–1932	41.489407°N 81.693554°W
		New York, Chicago, & St. Louis Railroad Viaduct	Norfolk Southern	Cleveland, Cuyahoga County	1882; rebuilt 1907; river span replaced 1957 (Note: The 1882 was a low truss bridge with a swing span at the Cuyahoga River. The 1907 replacement was a high plate girder span with a Scherzer rolling bridge at the Cuyahoga River. The rolling lift bridge was replaced in 1957 with a 267-foot (81 m) high lift bridge.)	41.486706°N 81.691677°W
		George V. Voinovich Bridge westbound span	I-90	Cleveland, Cuyahoga County	2011–2013	41°29′10″N 81°41′24″W
		George V. Voinovich Bridge eastbound span	I-90	Cleveland, Cuyahoga County	2014–2016	41.486305°N 81.690314°W
3.42	1869728	West 3rd Street Bridge	W. 3rd Street	Cleveland, Cuyahoga County	1903; rebuilt 1940	41.488118°N 81.685646°W
		Erie Lackawanna rail bridge (closed)	former Erie Lackawanna Railway	Cleveland, Cuyahoga County		
		Jefferson Avenue bridge (closed)	former Jefferson Avenue	Cleveland, Cuyahoga County		41.482278°N 81.676195°W
		Quigley–Rockefeller rail draw bridge	Near intersection of Quigley Road and W. 3rd Street	Cleveland, Cuyahoga County	1906	41.479264°N 81.674404°W
	1811991	Interstate 490 bridge	I-490	Cleveland, Cuyahoga County	1990	41.4785°N 81.673642°W
		CW conveyor belt		Newburgh Heights, Cuyahoga County		41.471732°N 81.669007°W
		CW pipeline bridge		Newburgh Heights, Cuyahoga County		41.471169°N 81.668878°W
		N.S. Railway bridge No. 3 (L).W. & L.E.R.R.	Cleveland Works Railway Operation	Newburgh Heights, Cuyahoga County		41.470662°N 81.668825°W
		Clark–Pershing bridge (closed)	former Rt. 329 Clark Avenue	Newburgh Heights, Cuyahoga County	1917	
		Newburg and South Shore rail lift bridge	Newburg and South Shore Railroad	Newburgh Heights, Cuyahoga County		41.469786°N 81.669039°W
		CWRO steel mill rail bridge	Cleveland Works Railway Operation	Newburgh Heights, Cuyahoga County		41.464842°N 81.676946°W
		CW steel mill conveyor bridge		Newburgh Heights, Cuyahoga County		41.464769°N 81.677271°W
		CWRO steel mill rail bridge	Cleveland Works Railway Operation	Newburgh Heights, Cuyahoga County		41.464775°N 81.677351°W
		private road bridge (Cleveland Works Steel Mill)	Cuyahoga Works Steel Mill private road	Newburgh Heights, Cuyahoga County		41.464424°N 81.678309°W
		CW pipeline bridge		Newburgh Heights, Cuyahoga County		41.462727°N 81.680819°W
		CWRO rail bridge	Cleveland Works Railway Operation	Newburgh Heights, Cuyahoga County		41.454325°N 81.683898°W
	1832344	Harvard–Denison bridge	Rt. 37 Denison Avenue–Harvard Avenue	Newburgh Heights, Cuyahoga County	1910; rebuilt 1977	41.449275°N 81.681635°W
		CWRO rail bridge	Cleveland Works Railway Operation	Newburgh Heights, Cuyahoga County		41.449219°N 81.681055°W
	1830651	Harvard Avenue bridge	Cuyahoga CR-43	Newburgh Heights, Cuyahoga County	1955	41.447313°N 81.684639°W
		NEORSD Big Creek Interceptor pipeline bridge		Brooklyn Heights, Cuyahoga County		41.427221°N 81.666228°W
		CSXT rail bridge	CSXT	Brooklyn Heights, Cuyahoga County		41.427004°N 81.665799°W
		BP/Sohio pipeline bridge	BP/Sohio pipeline	Brooklyn Heights, Cuyahoga County		41.426537°N 81.664908°W
		NEORSD rail bridge		Cuyahoga Heights, Cuyahoga County		41.418307°N 81.648°W
	1806173	Interstate 77 bridge	I-77	Independence, Cuyahoga	1976	41.418066°N 81.643322°W
		Brecksville Road bridge	SR 21 (Brecksville Road)	Independence, Cuyahoga		41.417905°N 81.641745°W
		rail bridge		Valley View, Cuyahoga County		41.417865°N 81.641369°W
	1802585	Granger Road bridge	SR 17 (Granger Road)	Valley View, Cuyahoga County	1939	41.414071°N 81.637855°W
	1812521 and 1812548	Valley View Bridge North span	I-480 west (Outerbelt South Freeway)	Garfield Heights, Valley View, and Independence, Cuyahoga County	1972–1978	41.408552°N 81.633843°W
		Valley View Bridge Middle span	I-480 (Outerbelt South Freeway)	Garfield Heights, Valley View, and Independence, Cuyahoga County	2018–2020	41.408552°N 81.633843°W
	1812521 and 1812548	Valley View Bridge South span	I-480 east (Outerbelt South Freeway)	Garfield Heights, Valley View, and Independence, Cuyahoga County	1972–1978	41.408552°N 81.633843°W
		Old Rockside Road bridge	Old Rockside Road	Independence, Cuyahoga County		41.394601°N 81.629256°W
13.1	1830279	Rockside Road bridge	Cuyahoga CR-53	Independence, Cuyahoga County	1964	41.393716°N 81.629203°W
		Hemlock Trail	all-purpose bicycle/pedestrian trail	Independence, Cuyahoga County	2019	41.382529 N, 81.623145 W
		Stone Road bridge (closed)	former Stone Road	Independence, Cuyahoga County		
15.6	1832107	Hillside Road bridge	Cuyahoga CR-145 Hillside Road	Independence, Cuyahoga County	1923	41.373294°N 81.614762°W
		CVSR–Canal trail bridge	all-purpose bicycle/pedestrian trail	Independence, Cuyahoga County		41.373141°N 81.614901°W
16.36		former Riverview Road-Tinkers Creek Road bridge (closed)	former Riverview Road-Tinkers Creek Road	Independence, Cuyahoga County		
	1830449	East Pleasant Valley Road bridge	Cuyahoga CR-39 East Pleasant Valley Road	Independence, Cuyahoga County	1958	41.359597°N 81.599731°W
		CVSR maintenance yard access road bridge	Cuyahoga Valley Scenic Railroad maintenance yard access road	Independence, Cuyahoga County		
20	7706871	Brecksville-Northfield High Level Bridge	SR 82 (Chippewa Road/West Aurora Road)	Sagamore Hills, Summit County	1931	41.321364°N 81.587199°W
20.71		Ohio and Erie Canal diversion dam		Sagamore Hills, Summit County	1825–1827	41°19′15″N 81°35′15″W
		Station Road-Bridle Trail bridge		Sagamore Hills, Summit County	1882	41.319333°N 81.587575°W
	7751001	Buckeye Towpath Connector bridge	Rt. 111 Highland-Vaughn Road	Sagamore Hills, Summit County	1967	41.288763°N 81.565012°W
		unsequenced bridge		Sagamore Hills, Summit County		41.356626°N 81.597671°W
		Jaite paper mill rail bridge	former Valley Rail, Baltimore and Ohio Railroad	Sagamore Hills, Summit County		41.284655°N 81.567109°W
26.5–29.2	7733194	Boston Mills Road bridge	Rt. 32	Boston Township, Summit County	1999	41.262925°N 81.560071°W
	7709005 and 7709064	Interstate 271 bridges	I-271 (Cleveland Outerbelt East)	Boston Township, Summit County	1968	41.261215°N 81.55726°W
	7729618 and 7729642	Interstate 80 / Ohio Turnpike bridges	I-80 / Ohio Turnpike	Boston Township, Summit County	2001 and 2003	41.255948°N 81.556027°W
		CVSR bridge	Cuyahoga Valley Scenic Railroad	Peninsula, Summit County		41.250068°N 81.54974°W
		Peninsula Aqueduct (closed)	former Ohio and Erie Canal	Peninsula, Summit County	1825–1827	
		Ohio and Erie Canal Towpath Trail Peninsula bridge	All-purpose bicycle/pedestrian trail	Peninsula, Summit County		41.242542°N 81.550147°W
	7709935	West Streetsboro Road bridge	SR 303	Peninsula, Summit County	1956	41.241291°N 81.54975°W
		CVSR bridge	Cuyahoga Valley Scenic Railroad	Peninsula, Summit County		41.233102°N 81.550995°W
33.2–33.3	7745206	Bolanz Road bridge	Rt. 81 Bolanz Road	Cuyahoga Falls, Summit County	1982	41.200812°N 81.568515°W
	7745249	Ira Road bridge	Rt. 46 Ira Road	Cuyahoga Falls, Summit County	1996	41.181515°N 81.583412°W
37.2	7745060	West Bath Road bridge	Rt. 48 Bath Road	Akron, Summit County	1959	41.162291°N 81.574352°W
		CVNP pedestrian bridge		Akron, Summit County		41.152901°N 81.567961°W
39.7-40.25	7730160	North Portage Path bridge	Rt. 29 Portage Path	Akron, Summit County	1931	41.135841°N 81.54756°W
		Ohio and Erie Canal Towpath Trail connector (Akron)	all-purpose bicycle/pedestrial trail	Akron, Summit County		41.132819°N 81.538929°W
		Valley View Golf Club (Akron)	pedestrian bridge	Akron, Summit County		41.124402°N 81.531435°W
	7730411	Cuyahoga Street bridge	Rt. 28	Akron, Summit County	1997	41.11712°N 81.525051°W
43.9	7730306	State Road/North Main Street bridge		Akron-Cuyahoga Falls border, Summit County	1948	41.122729°N 81.509376°W
45.8		Gorge Metropolitan Park Dam		Akron-Cuyahoga Falls border, Summit County	1912	41°07′23″N 81°29′50″W
	7730322	Front Street bridge		Akron-Cuyahoga Falls border, Summit County	1981	41.11826°N 81.493444°W
		Prospect scenic overlook		Cuyahoga Falls, Summit County		41.130455°N 81.482619°W
	7763905	Broad Boulevard bridge	Broad Boulevard	Cuyahoga Falls, Summit County	2004	41.133631°N 81.482104°W
	7700636	Portage Trail bridge	Portage Trail	Cuyahoga Falls, Summit County	1970	41.136225°N 81.481546°W
49.9		Cuyahoga Falls Low Head Dam		Cuyahoga Falls, Summit County		41°08′14″N 81°28′53″W
	7700644	Ohio Routes 8 and 59 bridge	SR 8 / SR 59	Cuyahoga Falls, Summit County	1974	41.140152°N 81.478027°W
		CA&C railroad bridge		Cuyahoga Falls, Summit County		41.144951°N 81.472952°W
		former Bailey Road pedestrian bridge	Bailey Road pedestrian trail	Cuyahoga Falls, Summit County		41.145016°N 81.472609°W
	7763891	Hudson Drive bridge	Hudson Drive	Cuyahoga Falls, Summit County	2002	41.145775°N 81.471622°W
	7763867	Oak Park Boulevard bridge	Oak Park Boulevard	Cuyahoga Falls, Summit County	1997	41.148247°N 81.467685°W
		pedestrian bridge	pedestrian trail	Cuyahoga Falls, Summit County		41.147827°N 81.449617°W
48.7–49.7	7707142	North Main Street bridge	SR 91	Munroe Falls, Summit County	1963	41.142277°N 81.438845°W
	6736440	Middlebury Road bridge	Middlebury Road	Kent, Portage County	1960	41.137889°N 81.390834°W
		The Portage Bike and Hike Trail	all-purpose bicycle/pedestrial trail	Kent, Portage County	2012	41.142879°N 81.372933°W
		W&LE Railway Cleveland Subdivision	W&LE	Kent, Portage County		41.143759°N 81.371286°W
		Kent sewage pipe		Kent, Portage County		41.145326°N 81.369762°W
		B&O–W&LE connection (railroad bridge, now removed)		Kent, Portage County		41.147709°N 81.368882°W
	6760007	Fred Fuller Park/Kramer Fields (cemetery) bridge	Fred Fuller Park Drive	Kent, Portage County	1948	41.149689°N 81.367188°W
	6737498	Stow–West Summit bridge	Stow Street and West Summit Street	Kent, Portage County	1966	41.150481°N 81.36237°W
	6701132	Redmond Greer Memorial Bridge	SR 43 / SR 59 (Haymaker Parkway)	Kent, Portage County	1975	41.151192°N 81.361566°W
54.8		Kent Dam		Kent, Portage County		41°9′12″N 81°21′35″W
	6737080	West Main Street bridge	West Main Street (Kent)	Kent, Portage County	1931	41.153825°N 81.359549°W
		Fairchild Avenue bridge	Fairchild Avenue	Kent, Portage County	2009–2013	41.158318°N 81.359259°W
	6737390	Crain Avenue bridge (removed)	Crain Avenue	Kent, Portage County	1965	41.158874°N 81.359109°W
		The Portage Bike and Hike Trail	all-purpose bicycle/pedestrial trail	Kent, Portage County	2013	41.158874°N 81.359109°W
	6760120	River Bend Boulevard bridge	River Bend Boulevard	Kent, Portage County	1998	41.168623°N 81.346438°W
		Former Lake Erie & Pittsburgh Railway		Franklin Township, Portage County		41.17921°N 81.335119°W
		Ravenna Road bridge	Ravenna Road	Franklin Township, Portage County		41.180518°N 81.335527°W
		Norfolk Southern Railway Cleveland Line	Norfolk Southern	Franklin Township, Portage County		41.180793°N 81.335227°W
57.97		Lake Rockwell Dam	Lake Rockwell	Franklin Township, Portage County		41°10′58″N 81°19′51″W
	6700586	Cleveland–East Liverpool Road bridge	SR 14 (Cleveland-East Liverpool Road)	Streetsboro, Portage County	1985	41.209671°N 81.303855°W
	6704417	Richfield–Hudson Road bridge	SR 303	Shalersville Township, Portage County	1959	41.24507°N 81.285971°W
	6729495	Interstate 80 bridge	I-80 / Ohio Turnpike	Shalersville Township, Portage County	1954	41.248103°N 81.283846°W
	6735290	Coit Road bridge	Portage CR-210 Coit Road	Shalersville Township, Portage County	1940	41.248764°N 81.269083°W
	6734979	Infirmary Road bridge	Portage CR-164 Infirmary Road	Shalersville Township, Portage County	1996	41.268944°N 81.246167°W
		Main Street–Line and Orchard Street road bridge	access road	Mantua, Portage County		41.277587°N 81.226942°W
	6701620	Main Street bridge	SR 44	Mantua, Portage County	1935	41.278707°N 81.224549°W
		former High–Prospect bridge	pedestrian trail	Mantua, Portage County		41.282045°N 81.220902°W
	6733972	East High Street bridge	High Street	Mantua, Portage County	1940	41.283964°N 81.216567°W
	6733662	Pioneer Trail bridge	Portage CR-254	Mantua Township, Portage County	1991	41.30078°N 81.203038°W
	6703364	Twinsburg Warren Road	SR 82	Mantua Township, Portage County	1950	41.310499°N 81.194766°W
		Allyn Road bridge (closed)	former Allyn Road			41.338506°N 81.167429°W
	6734316	Winchell Road bridge	Portage CR-264/278	Hiram, Portage County	1993	41.340931°N 81.166925°W
	2801779	Main Market Road bridge	US 422	Welshfield, Geauga County	1963	41.386708°N 81.157677°W

Source at 41°26′25″N 81°09′5.5″W, elevation: 1,093 feet (333.1 m)
confluence of East Branch Cuyahoga River and West Branch Cuyahoga River
near Pond Road and Rapids Road in Burton, Geauga County, Ohio.

== Bibliography ==
- Bluestone, Daniel M., ed. (1978). Cleveland: An Inventory of Historic Engineering and Industrial Sites. Washington, D.C.: Historic American Engineering Record, U.S. Department of the Interior. hdl:2027/uiug.30112024125988.
