= National Register of Historic Places listings in Summit County, Ohio =

Location of Summit County in Ohio

This is a list of the National Register of Historic Places listings in Summit County, Ohio.

This is intended to be a complete list of the properties and districts on the National Register of Historic Places in Summit County, Ohio, United States. Latitude and longitude coordinates are provided for many National Register properties and districts; these locations may be seen together in an online map.

There are 188 properties and districts listed on the National Register in the county, including 3 National Historic Landmarks. The city of Akron is the location of 64 of these properties and districts, including 2 of the National Historic Landmarks; they are listed separately, while the 125 properties and districts and the National Historic Landmarks in the remaining parts of the county are listed here. One district, the Valley Railway Historic District, is split between Akron and other parts of the county, and is thus included on both lists. Another 2 properties were once listed but have been removed.

This National Park Service list is complete through NPS recent listings posted April 17, 2026.

== Active listings ==
=== Outside Akron ===
	Name on the Register	Image	Date listed	Location	City or town	Description
1	Francis D. Alling House	Francis D. Alling House	November 30, 1987 (#87002093)	323 East Ave. 41°06′06″N 81°25′43″W	Tallmadge	
2	Anna-Dean Farm	Anna-Dean Farm	July 14, 1977 (#77001086)	State Route 619; 41°00′24″N 81°37′38″W	Barberton	
3	O. C. Barber Barn No. 1	O. C. Barber Barn No. 1	February 28, 1973 (#73001538)	115 3rd St. 41°00′26″N 81°35′37″W	Barberton	
4	O. C. Barber Colt Barn	O. C. Barber Colt Barn	October 9, 1974 (#74001626)	Austin Dr. 41°00′18″N 81°34′44″W	Barberton	
5	O. C. Barber Creamery	O. C. Barber Creamery	May 22, 1973 (#73001539)	365 Portsmouth Ave. 41°00′25″N 81°35′33″W	Barberton	
6	O. C. Barber Machine Barn		October 9, 1974 (#74001627)	Austin Dr. 41°00′22″N 81°34′42″W	Barberton	
7	O. C. Barber Piggery	O. C. Barber Piggery	May 22, 1973 (#73001540)	248 Robinson Ave. 41°00′35″N 81°35′49″W	Barberton	
8	Barberton Downtown Historic District		May 23, 2022 (#100007724)	Roughly bounded by West Lake and West Tuscarawas Aves., 2nd St. NW, 1st St. NW, 3rd St. NW, 6th St. NW, and 8th St. NW; 41°00′50″N 81°36′31″W	Barberton	
9	Barker Village Site	Barker Village Site	April 19, 1978 (#78000379)	Just north of the old railroad station at Botzum; 41°09′56″N 81°34′39″W	Cuyahoga Falls	Discovered when the Ohio and Erie Canal was constructed through the site
10	William Barker Residence	William Barker Residence	June 11, 1979 (#79002797)	805 Wye Rd. in Ghent; 41°09′27″N 81°38′12″W	Bath Township	
11	Bath Township Hall	Bath Township Hall	June 11, 1979 (#79002805)	1241 N. Cleveland-Massilon Rd. 41°11′21″N 81°38′10″W	Bath Township	
12	Bath Township School	Bath Township School	June 11, 1979 (#79002801)	4655 Akron-Medina Rd., southeast of Ghent; 41°08′13″N 81°40′09″W	Bath Township	
13	Francis Becker House	Francis Becker House	June 24, 2002 (#02000672)	3010 Hickory St. 40°55′33″N 81°38′28″W	Clinton	
14	Berkshire Park Historic District		February 4, 2021 (#100006088)	Roughly Bounded by Oakwood Dr., Roosevelt Ave., Elmwood St., 4th St., 3rd St., Miller Ct. 41°08′29″N 81°29′01″W	Cuyahoga Falls	
15	Boston Mills Historic District	Boston Mills Historic District	November 9, 1992 (#92001490)	Roughly Riverview, Boston Mills, and Stanford Rds. and Main St. 41°15′52″N 81°33′34″W	Boston Township	
16	Botzum Farm	Botzum Farm	October 21, 1999 (#99001271)	3486 Riverview Rd. 41°10′26″N 81°34′53″W	Cuyahoga Falls	
17	Brecksville-Northfield High Level Bridge	Brecksville-Northfield High Level Bridge	January 17, 1986 (#86000078)	State Route 82 and the Cuyahoga River; 41°19′16″N 81°35′11″W	Sagamore Hills Township	Extends into Brecksville in Cuyahoga County
18	Brookdale Farm	Brookdale Farm	December 7, 2010 (#10000975)	1148 N. Cleveland-Massillon Rd., north of Akron; 41°10′00″N 81°38′14″W	Bath Township	
19	Jim Brown House	Jim Brown House	March 2, 1979 (#79000299)	South of Peninsula at 3491 Akron Peninsula Rd. 41°10′54″N 81°34′42″W	Cuyahoga Falls	
20	Jim Brown Tavern	Jim Brown Tavern	December 11, 1979 (#79000300)	Boston Mills Rd. 41°15′48″N 81°33′31″W	Boston Township	
21	John Brown Farmhouse	John Brown Farmhouse	September 22, 1977 (#77001088)	1842 Hines Hill Rd. 41°15′48″N 81°26′54″W	Hudson	
22	H. Karl Butler Memorial	H. Karl Butler Memorial	January 2, 1997 (#96001510)	Truxell Rd., southeast of its junction with Peninsula Rd., Camp Manatoc; 41°13′19″N 81°31′49″W	Boston Township	Honors H. Karl Butler who donated land for Camp Manatoc.
23	Camp Manatoc Concord Lodge and Adirondacks Historic District	Camp Manatoc Concord Lodge and Adirondacks Historic District	January 2, 1997 (#96001513)	Truxell Rd., southeast of its junction with Peninsula Rd., Camp Manatoc; 41°13′07″N 81°31′46″W	Boston Township	
24	Camp Manatoc Dining Hall	Camp Manatoc Dining Hall	January 2, 1997 (#96001511)	Truxell Rd., southeast of its junction with Peninsula Rd., Camp Manatoc; 41°13′15″N 81°31′44″W	Boston Township	
25	Camp Manatoc Foresters Lodge and Kit Carson-Dan Boone Cabins Historic District	Camp Manatoc Foresters Lodge and Kit Carson-Dan Boone Cabins Historic District	January 2, 1997 (#96001514)	Truxell Rd., southeast of its junction with Peninsula Rd., Camp Manatoc; 41°13′39″N 81°31′58″W	Boston Township	
26	Camp Manatoc Legion Lodge	Camp Manatoc Legion Lodge	January 2, 1997 (#96001512)	Truxell Rd., southeast of its junction with Peninsula Rd., Camp Manatoc; 41°13′07″N 81°31′46″W	Boston Township	
27	Case-Barlow Farm		August 15, 2019 (#100003498)	1931 Barlow Rd. 41°12′59″N 81°25′30″W	Hudson	
28	Chuckery Race	Chuckery Race	December 15, 1972 (#72001047)	South of and in Cuyahoga Falls; 41°07′06″N 81°29′30″W	Cuyahoga Falls	
29	Clinton Ohio and Erie Canal Historic District-Clinton Lock 2 and 3-Clinton Upper (Lock 2) and Clinton Lower (Lock 3)	Clinton Ohio and Erie Canal Historic District-Clinton Lock 2 and 3-Clinton Upper (Lock 2) and Clinton Lower (Lock 3)	March 16, 2003 (#03000111)	Approximately along the canal channel parallel to Water St. 40°55′44″N 81°37′47″W	Clinton	
30	Albert Cofta Farmstead	Albert Cofta Farmstead	November 4, 2004 (#04001214)	2966 Brush Rd., northeast of Richfield; 41°15′13″N 81°36′56″W	Richfield Township	
31	Copley Depot	Copley Depot	May 31, 2001 (#01000563)	3772 Copley Rd. 41°05′57″N 81°39′13″W	Copley Township	
32	Copley Township Cemetery Receiving Vault	Copley Township Cemetery Receiving Vault	July 13, 2017 (#100001333)	3772 Copley Rd. 41°05′57″N 81°39′07″W	Copley Township	
33	John William Creswell Corbusier House	John William Creswell Corbusier House	October 5, 1989 (#89001451)	226 College St. 41°14′57″N 81°26′18″W	Hudson	
34	Edward Cranz Farm	Edward Cranz Farm	March 12, 1993 (#93000077)	2780 Oak Hill Dr., south of Peninsula; 41°11′50″N 81°35′31″W	Bath Township	
35	William and Eugene Cranz Farm	William and Eugene Cranz Farm	March 12, 1993 (#93000078)	2401 Ira Rd., south of Peninsula; 41°11′15″N 81°35′31″W	Bath Township	
36	Cuyahoga Falls Downtown Historic District		September 6, 2018 (#100002881)	111-245 Portage Trail, 138 Stowe Ave., 2035 Oldetown Loop, and 2091-2250 Front, 2044-2220 2nd, and 2055-2253 3rd Sts. 41°08′11″N 81°29′03″W	Cuyahoga Falls	
37	Diamond Match Historic District	Diamond Match Historic District	February 29, 1996 (#96000218)	3, 21, and 27 4th St., NW., and 8 2nd St., NW. 41°00′39″N 81°36′31″W	Barberton	
38	Michael Duffy Farm	Michael Duffy Farm	March 12, 1993 (#93000079)	4965 Quick Rd., southeast of Peninsula; 41°12′15″N 81°30′58″W	Boston Township	
39	East Liberty School, District No. 11	East Liberty School, District No. 11	July 3, 2017 (#100001271)	3492 S. Arlington St. 40°58′33″N 81°29′36″W	Green	
40	Everett Historic District	Everett Historic District	January 14, 1993 (#93001467)	4731-4642 Riverview Rd. and 2151-2279 Everett Rd., south of Peninsula, in the Cuyahoga Valley National Park; 41°12′16″N 81°34′29″W	Boston Township	
41	Everett Knoll Complex	Everett Knoll Complex	May 25, 1977 (#77000157)	Southern side of Everett Rd., west of its junction with Riverview Rd. 41°12′16″N 81°34′33″W	Boston Township	
42	Falls Stamping and Welding Building	Falls Stamping and Welding Building	February 23, 2016 (#16000045)	1701 S. Front St. 41°07′41″N 81°29′06″W	Cuyahoga Falls	
43	First Congregational Church of Cuyahoga Falls	First Congregational Church of Cuyahoga Falls	November 3, 1975 (#75001538)	130 Broad Boulevard; 41°08′01″N 81°29′03″W	Cuyahoga Falls	
44	Fort Island Works	Fort Island Works	December 2, 1970 (#70000087)	In Fort Island Park, at 413 Tunko Rd. 41°07′10″N 81°37′02″W	Fairlawn	
45	Furnace Run Aqueduct	Furnace Run Aqueduct	December 11, 1979 (#79000301)	Furnace Run; 41°12′06″N 81°34′20″W	Cuyahoga Falls	
46	Ghent Historic District	Ghent Historic District	December 7, 2010 (#10000974)	Western side of Wye Rd. between Granger and Yellow Creek Rd. in Ghent; 41°09′26″N 81°38′13″W	Bath Township	
47	Elijah Hale Residence	Elijah Hale Residence	June 11, 1979 (#79002795)	3243 Ira Rd. 41°11′22″N 81°37′15″W	Bath Township	
48	Jonathan Hale Homestead	Jonathan Hale Homestead	April 23, 1973 (#73000258)	2686 Oak Hill Rd. 41°11′35″N 81°35′33″W	Bath Township	
49	John Harshey Residence	John Harshey Residence	June 11, 1979 (#79002804)	4270 Bath Rd. 41°10′07″N 81°39′07″W	Bath Township	
50	Levi J. Hartong House and Farm	Levi J. Hartong House and Farm	October 17, 2007 (#07001089)	6521 Mt. Pleasant Rd. 40°54′29″N 81°28′10″W	Green	
51	Edward Heller Residence	Edward Heller Residence	June 11, 1979 (#79002798)	3891 Granger Rd., west of Ghent; 41°09′40″N 81°39′02″W	Bath Township	
52	J. Hershey Residence	J. Hershey Residence	June 11, 1979 (#79002802)	286 Cleveland-Massilon Rd., south of Ghent; 41°08′37″N 81°38′15″W	Bath Township	
53	Roswell Hopkins Residence	Roswell Hopkins Residence	June 11, 1979 (#79002799)	299 Hametown Rd., southeast of Ghent; 41°08′38″N 81°40′13″W	Bath Township	
54	Hudson Historic District	Hudson Historic District	November 28, 1973 (#73001542)	Roughly bounded by College, Streetsboro, S. Main, and Baldwin Sts.; also roughly bounded by Hudson St., Old Orchard Dr., Aurora St., Oviatt St., Streetsboro St., and College St. to Aurora; also Roslyn Ave., Elm, Aurora, Baldwin, Chapel, Church, Division, Hudson, North Main, North Oviatt, Owen, Brown, and West. Prospect Sts. 41°14′37″N 81°26′31″W	Hudson	Second set of boundaries represents a boundary increase of October 5, 1989; third set represent a boundary increase of June 30, 2022
55	Humberger House	Humberger House	October 11, 2002 (#02001122)	7616 N. 2nd Ave. 40°55′30″N 81°38′27″W	Clinton	
56	Hunt-Wilke Farm	Hunt-Wilke Farm	March 12, 1993 (#93000080)	2049 Bolanz Rd. 41°12′03″N 81°34′19″W	Cuyahoga Falls	
57	Grace Goulder Izant House	Grace Goulder Izant House	October 4, 1989 (#89001450)	250 College St. 41°15′02″N 81°26′17″W	Hudson	
58	Jaite Mill Historic District	Jaite Mill Historic District	May 21, 1979 (#79000288)	Southeast of Brecksville at Riverview and Vaughan Rds. 41°17′03″N 81°33′47″W	Sagamore Hills Township	Extends into Brecksville in Cuyahoga County
59	Dustin Johnson Residence	Dustin Johnson Residence	June 11, 1979 (#79002806)	1946 Cleveland-Massilon Rd. 41°11′18″N 81°38′12″W	Bath Township	
60	Jyurovat Farmstead	Jyurovat Farmstead	May 25, 1995 (#95000588)	696 Streetsboro Rd., southeast of Peninsula; 41°13′54″N 81°31′05″W	Boston Heights	
61	Virginia Kendall State Park Historic District	Virginia Kendall State Park Historic District	January 2, 1997 (#96001515)	701, 801, and 1000 Truxell Rd. and 434 W. Streetsboro, southeast of Peninsula; 41°13′04″N 81°31′15″W	Boston Township	
62	J. Kent Residence	J. Kent Residence	June 11, 1979 (#79002792)	1727 Medina Line Rd. 41°11′00″N 81°41′07″W	Bath Township	
63	James Kirby Mill	James Kirby Mill	December 14, 1978 (#78002197)	West of West Richfield off State Route 303; 41°14′26″N 81°40′44″W	Richfield Township	
64	David Kittinger Residence		June 11, 1979 (#79002808)	1904 Cleveland-Massilon Rd. 41°11′14″N 81°38′12″W	Bath Township	No longer extant
65	Jeremiah Lambert House and Barn	Jeremiah Lambert House and Barn	December 7, 2010 (#10000977)	2138 Cleveland-Massillon Rd. in Ghent; 41°11′37″N 81°38′12″W	Bath Township	
66	J. Ligget Residence	J. Ligget Residence	June 11, 1979 (#79002803)	481 Cleveland-Massilon Rd., south of Ghent; 41°08′55″N 81°38′12″W	Bath Township	
67	Limbach Block Historic District	Limbach Block Historic District	November 29, 2001 (#01001280)	7843, 7845, 7847, 7849, 7851, and 7853 Main St. 40°55′38″N 81°37′48″W	Clinton	
68	Lock No. 26	Lock No. 26	December 11, 1979 (#79000302)	3.3 mi (5.3 km) north of Ira Rd. 41°11′08″N 81°34′53″W	Cuyahoga Falls	
69	Lock No. 27	Lock No. 27	December 11, 1979 (#79000303)	Approximately 400 ft (120 m) east of the intersection of Riverview and Everett Rds. at Everett; 41°12′11″N 81°34′15″W	Boston Township	
70	Lock No. 28	Lock No. 28	December 11, 1979 (#79000304)	Deep Lock Q Quarry Metro Park; 41°13′58″N 81°33′09″W	Peninsula	Originally listed as "Ohio and Erie Canal Deep Lock" in 1974; relisted under the present name in 1979
71	Lock No. 29 and Aqueduct	Lock No. 29 and Aqueduct	December 11, 1979 (#79000305)	Off State Route 303; 41°14′34″N 81°33′02″W	Peninsula	
72	Lock No. 30 and Feeder Dam	Lock No. 30 and Feeder Dam	December 11, 1979 (#79000306)	Off State Route 303; 41°14′41″N 81°33′14″W	Peninsula	
73	Lock No. 31	Lock No. 31	December 11, 1979 (#79000307)	200 ft (61 m) east of the Cuyahoga River and approximately 0.5 mi (0.80 km) south of the Ohio Turnpike; 41°15′06″N 81°32′46″W	Peninsula	
74	Lock No. 32	Lock No. 32	December 11, 1979 (#79000308)	800 ft (240 m) north of Boston Mills; 41°15′58″N 81°33′32″W	Boston Township	
75	Lock No. 33	Lock No. 33	December 11, 1979 (#79000309)	1 mi (1.6 km) south of Highland Rd. 41°16′36″N 81°33′40″W	Boston Township	
76	Lock No. 34	Lock No. 34	December 17, 1979 (#79000310)	Highland Rd. 41°17′21″N 81°33′53″W	Sagamore Hills Township	
77	Lock No. 35	Lock No. 35	December 11, 1979 (#79000311)	Off State Route 82; 41°18′38″N 81°34′56″W	Sagamore Hills Township	
78	Longwood Manor	Longwood Manor	September 3, 2014 (#14000548)	1634 E. Aurora Rd. 41°18′26″N 81°28′53″W	Macedonia	
79	Lutz-Martin Farm	Lutz-Martin Farm	July 3, 2003 (#03000608)	2470 Martin Rd. 41°10′32″N 81°35′33″W	Bath Township	
80	Frank H. Mason House		April 20, 1995 (#95000499)	615 Latham Ln. 40°57′49″N 81°32′44″W	New Franklin	
81	Robert McKisson House	Robert McKisson House	December 4, 1974 (#74001632)	7878 N. Gannett Rd. 41°19′23″N 81°33′51″W	Sagamore Hills Township	
82	Mentzer-Sorrick Farm		August 22, 2022 (#100008020)	365 Center Rd. 40°57′00″N 81°32′50″W	New Franklin	
83	Harvey Miller Residence	Harvey Miller Residence	June 11, 1979 (#79002800)	188 Hametown Rd., southeast of Ghent; 41°08′27″N 81°40′15″W	Bath Township	
84	Northfield Town Hall	Northfield Town Hall	August 10, 2000 (#00000962)	9546 Brandywine Rd. at Northfield Center; 41°18′54″N 81°32′23″W	Northfield Center Township	
85	Oakwood Cemetery Chapel	Oakwood Cemetery Chapel	November 12, 1999 (#99001334)	2420 Oakwood Dr. 41°08′34″N 81°29′12″W	Cuyahoga Falls	
86	Ohio and Erie Canal	Ohio and Erie Canal	November 13, 1966 (#66000607)	State Route 631 (Valley View Rd.); 41°13′31″N 81°33′22″W	Boston Township, Cuyahoga Falls, Peninsula, and Sagamore Hills Township	Extends into Cuyahoga County
87	Orson Minot Oviatt House		February 16, 2021 (#100006141)	3758 Brecksville Rd. 41°14′17″N 81°38′17″W	Richfield	
88	Isaac and Maria Ozmun Farmstead	Isaac and Maria Ozmun Farmstead	December 28, 2000 (#00001556)	6928 Olde Eight Rd. 41°15′15″N 81°30′28″W	Boston Heights	
89	Palmer House	Palmer House	August 13, 1974 (#74001628)	9370 Olde Eight Rd. 41°18′56″N 81°32′22″W	Northfield Center Township	
90	Peninsula Village Historic District	Peninsula Village Historic District	August 23, 1974 (#74000346)	Both sides of State Route 303; also Stine and Dell Rds., Emerson St., Boston Run, and Deep Lock Quarry Metro Park; 41°14′24″N 81°33′03″W	Peninsula	Second set of boundaries represents a boundary increase of May 8, 2017
91	Nathaniel Point Farm	Nathaniel Point Farm	September 3, 1999 (#99001084)	4606 and 4631 Akron-Peninsula Rd., south of Peninsula; 41°12′20″N 81°33′46″W	Boston Township	
92	Orin Porter House	Orin Porter House	October 5, 1989 (#89001449)	240 College St. 41°14′59″N 81°26′20″W	Hudson	
93	Porter-Aue House	Porter-Aue House	September 6, 2002 (#02000947)	2798 North St. 40°55′40″N 81°37′44″W	Clinton	
94	Jonathan Price House	Jonathan Price House	October 7, 2002 (#02001103)	7903 Main St. 40°55′36″N 81°37′40″W	Clinton	
95	Dr. Rufus Randall Residence	Dr. Rufus Randall Residence	June 11, 1979 (#79002796)	3675 Ira Rd. 41°11′21″N 81°38′06″W	Bath Township	
96	Luther B. Ranney Farm	Luther B. Ranney Farm	December 1, 1988 (#88002749)	6484 Old State Route 8; 41°14′35″N 81°30′04″W	Boston Heights	
97	Frank Mason Raymond House	Frank Mason Raymond House	April 20, 1995 (#95000500)	655 Latham Ln. 40°57′59″N 81°32′42″W	New Franklin	
98	John Richard Residence	John Richard Residence	June 11, 1979 (#79002807)	1924 Cleveland-Massilon Rd. 41°11′15″N 81°39′38″W	Bath Township	
99	Moses and Minerva Roach House		March 22, 2021 (#100006293)	9044 Church St. 41°18′42″N 81°26′31″W	Twinsburg	
100	Louis Schmitt House and Store	Louis Schmitt House and Store	February 14, 2002 (#02000084)	2967 Hickory St. 40°55′32″N 81°38′21″W	Clinton	No longer extant per Google Street View.
101	Samuel Shaw Residence	Samuel Shaw Residence	June 11, 1979 (#79002794)	1588 Hametown Rd. 41°10′51″N 81°39′59″W	Bath Township	
102	Sylvester Shaw Residence	Sylvester Shaw Residence	June 11, 1979 (#79002793)	1786 Hametown Rd. 41°11′09″N 81°39′58″W	Bath Township	
103	David Smith House	David Smith House	October 4, 2002 (#02001104)	7966 Cleveland-Massillon Rd. 40°55′32″N 81°37′43″W	Clinton	
104	William Smith House	William Smith House	March 11, 2003 (#02001052)	7894 Main St. 40°55′36″N 81°37′43″W	Clinton	
105	Sorrick-Oster Store	Sorrick-Oster Store	October 11, 2002 (#02001123)	7846 Main St. 40°55′37″N 81°37′47″W	Clinton	
106	George Stanford Farm	George Stanford Farm	February 17, 1982 (#82001874)	6093 Stanford Rd., north of Peninsula; 41°16′16″N 81°33′25″W	Boston Township	
107	Station Road Bridge	Station Road Bridge	March 7, 1979 (#79000312)	East of Brecksville at the Cuyahoga River; 41°19′10″N 81°35′16″W	Sagamore Hills Township	Extends into Brecksville in Cuyahoga County
108	Stewart-Hanson Farm	Stewart-Hanson Farm	October 15, 1992 (#92001376)	2832 Call Rd. 41°11′18″N 81°24′19″W	Stow	
109	Stumpy Basin	Stumpy Basin	December 11, 1979 (#79000313)	200 ft (61 m) east of the Cuyahoga River and approximately 0.5 mi (0.80 km) south of the Ohio Turnpike, north of Peninsula; 41°15′20″N 81°32′45″W	Boston Township	
110	Tallmadge Town Square Historic District	Tallmadge Town Square Historic District	May 6, 1971 (#71000652)	Public Sq. 41°06′05″N 81°26′29″W	Tallmadge	
111	Thornton-Guise Kitchen And House	Thornton-Guise Kitchen And House	May 6, 1976 (#76001534)	147 S. Main St. 41°08′06″N 81°26′24″W	Munroe Falls	
112	Manville Thorp Residence	Manville Thorp Residence	June 11, 1979 (#79002791)	1907 Medina Lane Rd. 41°11′20″N 81°41′03″W	Bath Township	
113	Daniel Tilden House	Daniel Tilden House	June 20, 1985 (#85001340)	2325 Stine Rd., west of Peninsula; 41°14′48″N 81°35′17″W	Boston Township	
114	Tuscarawas Avenue – Alexander Square Commercial Historic District	Tuscarawas Avenue – Alexander Square Commercial Historic District	May 17, 1990 (#90000755)	Bounded by Park Ave., Tuscarawas Ave., and 4th and 5th Sts. 41°00′47″N 81°36′39″W	Barberton	
115	Twinsburg Congregational Church	Twinsburg Congregational Church	May 3, 1974 (#74001634)	Twinsburg Public Sq. 41°18′43″N 81°26′32″W	Twinsburg	
116	Twinsburg Institute	Twinsburg Institute	January 1, 1976 (#76001535)	8996 Darrow Rd. 41°18′38″N 81°26′27″W	Twinsburg	
117	Valley Railway Historic District	Valley Railway Historic District	May 17, 1985 (#85001123)	Cuyahoga Valley between Rockside Rd. in the Cuyahoga Valley National Park and Howard St. at Little Cuyahoga Valley; 41°14′40″N 81°32′56″W	Boston Township, Cuyahoga Falls, and Peninsula	Extends into Akron and into Cuyahoga County
118	Peter Voris Jr. House	Peter Voris Jr. House	December 7, 2010 (#10000976)	3622 Ira Rd. in Ghent; 41°11′20″N 81°37′59″W	Bath Township	
119	Wallace Farm	Wallace Farm	June 27, 1985 (#85001387)	8230 Brandywine Rd. 41°16′40″N 81°32′26″W	Northfield Center Township	
120	Ward House	Ward House	March 17, 1987 (#87000629)	1410 Hines Hill Rd. 41°15′38″N 81°27′46″W	Hudson	
121	Warwick Interlocking Tower	Warwick Interlocking Tower	December 12, 2002 (#02001516)	2955 S. 1st. St. 40°55′20″N 81°38′34″W	Clinton	
122	Allen Welton House	Allen Welton House	May 7, 1979 (#79000314)	Southwest of Peninsula at 2485 Major Rd. 41°14′00″N 81°35′01″W	Boston Township	
123	Western Reserve Academy	Western Reserve Academy	June 30, 1975 (#75001539)	Roughly bounded by Aurora St. and both sides of Oviatt, High, and Hudson; 41°14′46″N 81°26′15″W	Hudson	
124	Wolcott House	Wolcott House	May 5, 1988 (#88000468)	56 E. Twinsburg Rd., south of Northfield; 41°16′51″N 81°30′47″W	Northfield Center Township	
125	Zimmerly House	Zimmerly House	January 2, 2018 (#100001936)	4332 Manchester Rd. 40°59′06″N 81°33′36″W	New Franklin	

== Former listings ==
	Name on the Register	Image	Date listed	Date removed	Location	City or town	Description
1	Everett Road Covered Bridge	Everett Road Covered Bridge	May 23, 1974 (#74000344)	October 29, 1985	Southwest of Peninsula on Everett Rd. over Furnace Creek; 41°12′14″N 81°35′00″W	Boston Township	Washed out by a flood in May, 1975.
2	Jonathan Herrick House		July 18, 1974 (#74001633)	May 5, 1983	8327 Darrow Rd.(Original location. Now located at:); 41°11′34″N 81°35′39″W	Boston Township	Disassembled in 1981 and relocated to Hale Farm and Village.

== See also ==
- List of National Historic Landmarks in Ohio
- Listings in neighboring counties: Cuyahoga, Geauga, Medina, Portage, Stark, Wayne
- National Register of Historic Places listings in Ohio
