= Barber House =

Barber House, Barber Farm, or Barber Barn may refer to:

in the United States

- Giles Barber House, Windsor, Connecticut, listed on the National Register of Historic Places (NRHP) in Windsor, Connecticut
- Barber-Pittman House, Valdosta, Georgia, listed on the NRHP in Georgia
- Obediah Barber Homestead, Waycross, Georgia, listed on the NRHP in Georgia
- Bryant H. and Lucie Barber House, Polo, Illinois, listed on the NRHP in Illinois
- Henry D. Barber House, Polo, Illinois, listed on the NRHP in Illinois
- Barber-Barbour House, Harrods Creek, Kentucky, listed on the NRHP in Kentucky
- Kendrick-Tucker-Barber House, Mooresville, Kentucky, listed on the NRHP in Kentucky
- John R. Barber House, Springfield, Kentucky, listed on the NRHP in Kentucky
- Morse-Barber House, Sherborn, Massachusetts, listed on the NRHP in Massachusetts
- Belknap House, Carson City, Nevada, also known as the Barber-Belknap House, NRHP-listed
- Barber-Mulligan Farm, Avon, New York, listed on the NRHP in New York
- Barber Farm (Cleveland, North Carolina), listed on the NRHP in North Carolina
- O. C. Barber Barn No. 1, Barberton, Ohio, NRHP-listed
- O. C. Barber Colt Barn, Barberton, Ohio, NRHP-listed
- O. C. Barber Machine Barn, Barberton, Ohio, NRHP-listed
- O. C. Barber Piggery, Barberton, Ohio, NRHP-listed
- Barber-Whitticar House, Canton, Ohio, listed on the NRHP in Ohio
- Barber House (Hopkins, South Carolina), listed in the NRHP in South Carolina
- Charles A. Barber Farmstead, Lily, South Dakota, listed on the NRHP in South Dakota
- Barber House (San Marcos, Texas), listed on the NRHP in Texas
- Barnard-Garn-Barber House, Centerville, Utah, listed on the NRHP in Utah
- James Barber House, Eau Claire, Wisconsin, listed on the NRHP in Wisconsin
