= O. C. Barber Creamery =

- U.S. National Register of Historic Places
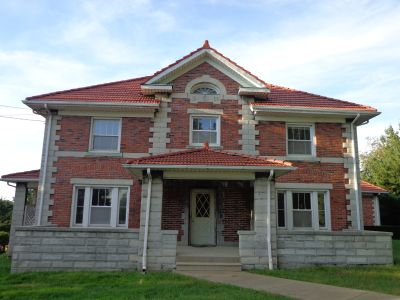

- Location within Ohio Location within the United States
- Location: Barberton, Ohio
- Coordinates: 41°0′25″N 81°35′33″W
- Built: 1909
- Architect: O.C. Barber
- NRHP reference No.: 73001539
- Added to NRHP: May 22, 1973

The O. C. Barber Creamery, built in 1909, is an historic farm building located at 365 Portsmouth Avenue on the Anna-Dean Farm in Barberton, Ohio. It was built by American businessman and industrialist Ohio Columbus Barber, the developer of both Barberton, which he envisioned as a planned industrial community, and the nearby 3,500-acre (14 km²) Anna-Dean Farm, which he envisioned as a prototype for modern agricultural enterprise. Barber was called America's Match King because of his controlling interest in the Diamond Match Company.

The Creamery was used to process and bottle the milk produced on the Anna-Dean Farm and to make ice cream, all of which was sold under the Anna Dean Farm brand name. Up to 10,000 pounds of milk were processed per day.

On May 22, 1973, it was added to the National Register of Historic Places.

== See also ==
- List of Registered Historic Places in Summit County, Ohio
