= O. C. Barber Colt Barn =

- U.S. National Register of Historic Places
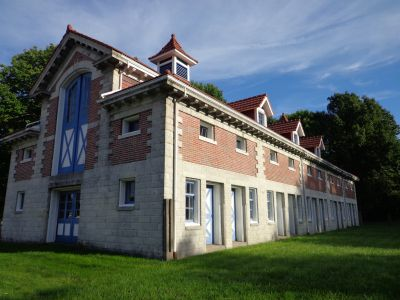

- Location within Ohio Location within the United States
- Location: Barberton, Ohio
- Coordinates: 41°0′18″N 81°34′44″W
- Built: 1910
- Architect: O.C. Barber, Michael Alexander
- NRHP reference No.: 74001626
- Added to NRHP: October 9, 1974

The O. C. Barber Colt Barn, built in 1912, is an historic farm building located on Austin Drive on the Anna-Dean Farm in Barberton, Ohio. It was built by American businessman and industrialist Ohio Columbus Barber, the developer of both Barberton, which he envisioned as a planned industrial community, and the nearby 3,500-acre (14 km^{2}) Anna-Dean Farm, which he envisioned as a prototype for modern agricultural enterprise. Barber was called America's Match King because of his controlling interest in the Diamond Match Company.

It is one of the smallest barns on the Anna-Dean Farm and was first called Bull Barn No 2 and used to house bulls until 1913, when it was renamed the Colt Barn and used to house colts and mares in foal.

On October 9, 1974, it was added to the National Register of Historic Places.

== See also ==
- List of Registered Historic Places in Summit County, Ohio
