= O. C. Barber Barn No. 1 =

- U.S. National Register of Historic Places
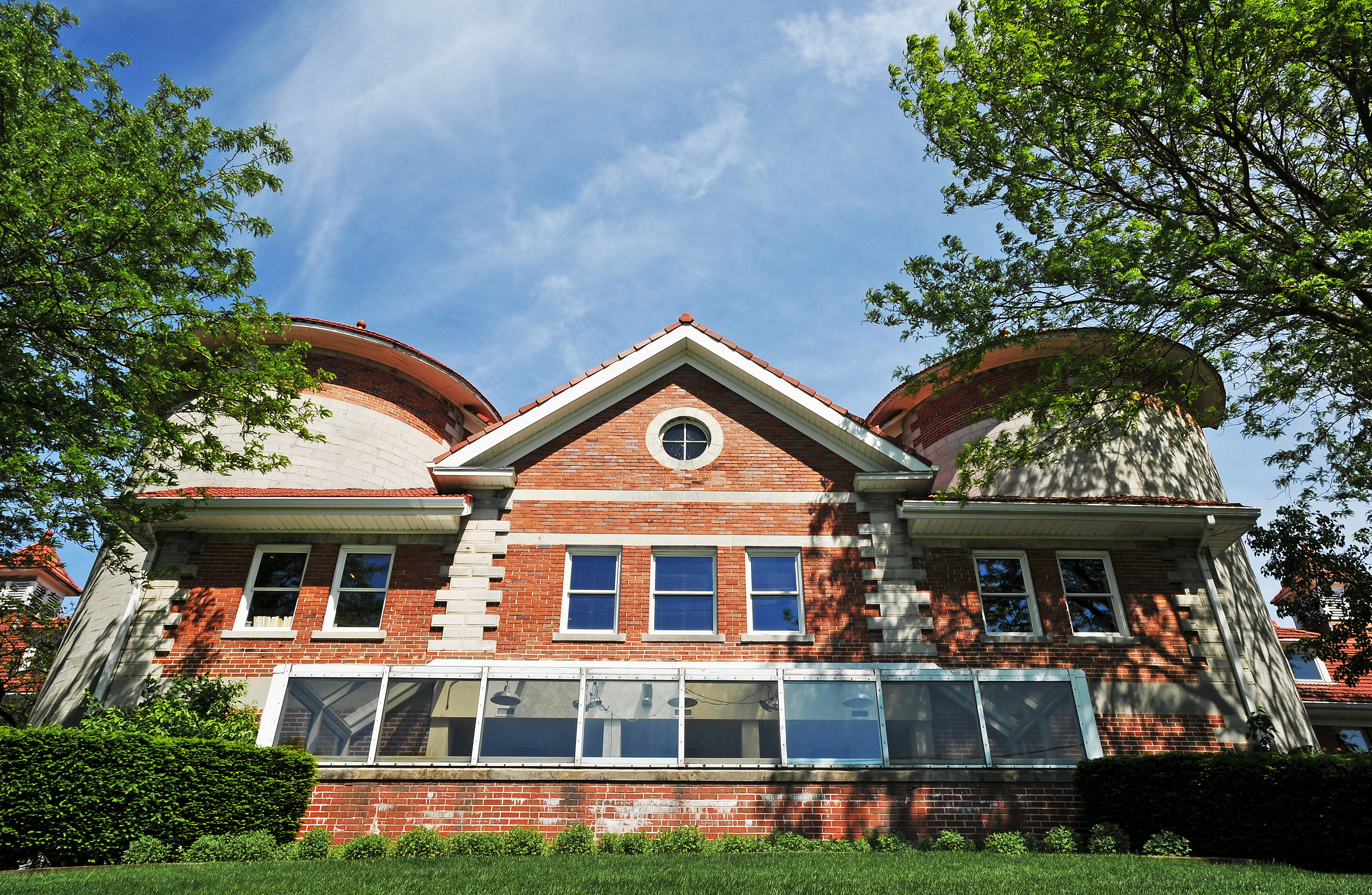

- Location within Ohio Location within the United States
- Location: 115 3rd St., Barberton, Ohio
- Coordinates: 41°0′26″N 81°35′37″W
- Built: 1909
- Architect: O.C. Barber, Michael Alexander
- NRHP reference No.: 73001538
- Added to NRHP: February 28, 1973

The O. C. Barber Barn No. 1, built in 1909, is a historic farm building located on the Anna-Dean Farm in Barberton, Ohio. It was built by American businessman and industrialist Ohio Columbus Barber, the developer of both Barberton, which he envisioned as a planned industrial community, and the nearby 3,500-acre(14 km^{2}) Anna-Dean Farm, which he envisioned as a prototype for modern agricultural enterprise. Barber was called America's Match King because of his controlling interest in the Diamond Match Company.

It incorporated all the latest U.S. government requirements for milk production barns, and upon completion was called the largest barn in the world by the Akron Beacon Journal, but it ended up being the smallest cow barn on the Anna-Dean Farm.

On February 28, 1973, it was added to the National Register of Historic Places.

== See also ==
- List of Registered Historic Places in Summit County, Ohio
