= Diamond Rubber Company =

- Founded: March 1894; 131 years ago in Akron, Ohio, United States
- Founder: O.C. Barber
- Defunct: 1912
- Fate: Merged with B.F. Goodrich
- Products: Tires

The Diamond Rubber Company was a manufacturer of vehicle tires and other rubber products at the end of the 19th, and into the early 20th century in the United States.

The Diamond Rubber Company was incorporated in March 1894 in Akron, Ohio by the owner of the Diamond Match Company, O.C. Barber. Barber had moved the match company plant to his adjacent self-named planned town of Barberton, Ohio in order to boost the town's economy which had taken a hit during the Panic of 1893. He decided to use the abandoned Diamond Match Company facility in Akron for his new rubber products factory.

The Diamond Rubber Company was located in the southwestern part of Akron, adjacent to the Ohio and Erie Canal, on the southwest side of Falor Street. The B.F. Goodrich plant was located across the street, on the northeast side of Falor. Today, Falor Street is named West Falor Street.

Some later sources have the company founded as the Sherbondy Rubber Company in 1893 or 1894 with its name changed to Diamond Rubber Company in 1896. But no such listing has been found for Sherbondy Rubber Company in the Akron city directories for those years, or any years. Instead, it is the Diamond Rubber Company that first appears in the 1894 Akron city directory, which also includes the information that it was incorporated in March of that year.

However, according to the publication The Growth of an Ideal, Embracing the History of the Goodrich Company, and the Economy of Factory and Branch Organization and Operation, by the B.F. Goodrich Company in 1918 (part of the Goodrich Employees Reading Course), "The removal of the Diamond Match Company to Barberton left vacant the buildings occupied in Akron, and in 1894, Mr. Ohio C. Barber, then President of the Diamond Match Company, with his associates incorporated the Sherbondy Rubber Company, whose home was to be the discarded plant of the match company...". "In 1896 Mr. Barber took a more active interest in the company and the name was changed to the Diamond Rubber Company. According to the 1894 Akron City Directory's Incorporated Companies section, the Diamond Rubber Company first appeared at the Falor location previously occupied by the Diamond Match Company, with G. F. Sherbondy serving as Vice-President, and Walter Sherbondy serving as Superintendent. G. F. Sherbondy was replaced by J. K. Robinson as Vice-President of Diamond Rubber Company in 1896.

Walter Sherbondy was granted U.S. patent 499,600 in 1893 for his design of a self-healing pneumatic tire.

The book Rubber: An American Industrial History states "Diamond Rubber was started in 1893 by the Sherbondy brothers (George, Walter and William)...". "The original capital came from the "Match King", O.C. Barber of Akron, President of the famous Diamond Match Company. He later took over Diamond Rubber".

In 1898, Harvard-trained chemist Arthur H. Marks was hired by Diamond. Marks invented a process to recycle old rubber. In 1900, Diamond constructed a new plant to utilize this patent in the recycling of old rubber. In 1904, Diamond and B.F. Goodrich entered into a rubber recycling joint venture, incorporated as the Alkali Rubber Company, and a new plant was constructed adjacent to the existing Diamond and B.F. Goodrich plants in Akron.

In March 1912, the Diamond Rubber Company was bought out by and merged with the B.F. Goodrich Company. The Diamond brand name and product line were retained and a subsidiary Diamond Rubber Company, was created for marketing and manufacturing them.
