= O. C. Barber Machine Barn =

- U.S. National Register of Historic Places
- Location within Ohio Location within the United States
- Location: Barberton, Ohio
- Coordinates: 41°0′22″N 81°34′42″W
- Built: 1911
- Architect: O.C. Barber, Michael Alexander
- NRHP reference No.: 74001627
- Added to NRHP: October 9, 1974

The O. C. Barber Machine Barn, also called the Implement House. built in 1911, is an historic farm building located on Austin Drive on the Anna-Dean Farm in Barberton, Ohio. It was built by American businessman and industrialist Ohio Columbus Barber, the developer of both Barberton, which he envisioned as a planned industrial community, and the nearby 3,500-acre (14 km^{2}) Anna-Dean Farm, which he envisioned as a prototype for modern agricultural enterprise. Barber was called America's Match King because of his controlling interest in the Diamond Match Company.

The Machine Barn was the service and storage place for all tractors and other equipment on the Anna-Dean Farm. It also housed the blacksmith shop.

On October 9, 1974, it was added to the National Register of Historic Places.

== See also ==
- List of Registered Historic Places in Summit County, Ohio
