= O. C. Barber Piggery =

- U.S. National Register of Historic Places
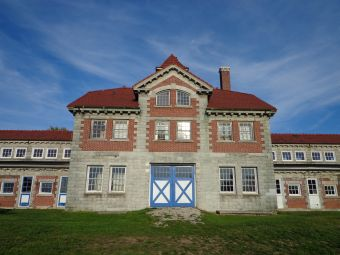

- Location within Ohio Location within the United States
- Location: Barberton, Ohio
- Coordinates: 41°0′35″N 81°35′49″W
- Built: 1912
- Architect: Harpster & Bliss
- Architectural style: Beaux Art
- NRHP reference No.: 73001540
- Added to NRHP: May 22, 1973

The O. C. Barber Piggery, built in 1912, is a historic farm building located at 248 Robinson Avenue on the Anna-Dean Farm in Barberton, Ohio. It was built by American businessman and industrialist Ohio Columbus Barber, the developer of both Barberton, which he envisioned as a planned industrial community, and the nearby 3,500-acre (14 km^{2}) Anna-Dean Farm, which he envisioned as a prototype for modern agricultural enterprise. Barber was called America's Match King because of his controlling interest in the Diamond Match Company.

The 300-foot-long (91 m) brick and block Piggery building, painted patriotic red, white and blue, was only used to house swine until 1915, when cholera was detected in the herd, which was then destroyed. After being thoroughly disinfected with bleach, the building was used to house sheep for two years, before they were replaced by calves because Barber was upset by the fact that the sheep destroyed the pastures by their grazing practices. The building was renamed the Calf Barn.

On May 22, 1973, it was added to the National Register of Historic Places.

== See also ==
- List of Registered Historic Places in Summit County, Ohio
