= Barberton station (Erie Railroad) =

Train station in Barberton, Ohio, USA

Barberton
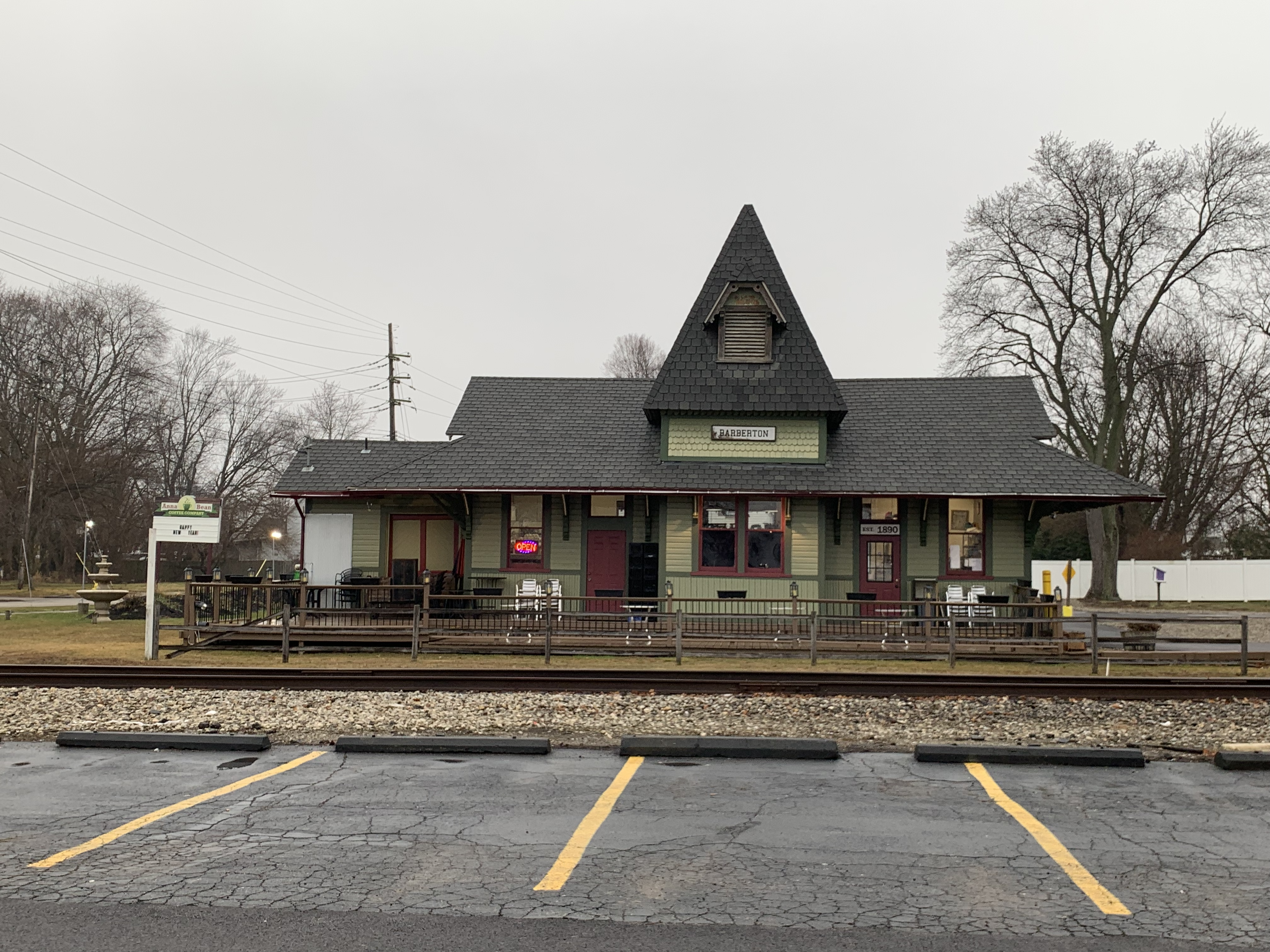
- The Barberton depot in January 2023, facing the former platform and front of the depot.

General information
- Location: 356 4th Street NW, Barberton, Ohio
- Coordinates: 41°01′14″N 81°36′33″W
- Line: Main Line (Kent Division)
- Platforms: 1 side platform

Other information
- Station code: 5809

History
- Opened: 1890
- Closed: August 1, 1965

Former services
Preceding station	Erie Railroad	Following station
Sherman toward Chicago	Main Line	Akron, OH toward Jersey City
Location

Barberton was a train station along the Erie Railroad main line in the city of Barberton, Summit County, Ohio, United States. Located 612.8 miles (986.2 km) from Hoboken Terminal on the Kent Division of the main line, the station first saw service in 1890 while under the ownership of the New York, Pennsylvania and Ohio Railroad, a subsidiary of the Erie Railroad, created to bring people to the new community. Passenger service was terminated on August 1, 1965, with the cancellation of the Atlantic Express (eastbound) Pacific Express (westbound), and multi-day trains from Hoboken to Dearborn Station in Chicago, Illinois.

Located at 356 4th Street NW, the city of Barberton was a big part of the large rubber manufacturing area in and around nearby Akron. The depot was constructed by Ohio Columbus Barber, the founder of the community which forked from New Portage Township and was designated a Type IV structure by the Erie Railroad in the Valuation Report to the Interstate Commerce Commission. The depot has also been an important stop for several Presidents of the United States, including two campaign stops for Theodore Roosevelt and William Howard Taft, as well as the funeral train for Warren G. Harding.

== History ==
=== Service history ===
The Erie Depot is Barberton, Ohio's first commercial building and was built in 1890 by Barberton's founder, American industrialist Ohio Columbus Barber, to promote the new town. Barberton was officially founded in 1891. The depot is built in the Stick Eastlake architectural style and is on the Erie Railroad. The Erie Railroad linked New York City with Chicago.

What became the Erie railroad tracks ran through what was then Norton in 1851, 39 years before the Erie Depot was built. The Erie Railroad was built only 50 years after the completion of the Transcontinental Railroad, which, prior to the Civil War was the main east-west link between New York City and Chicago. The first Erie station was built in the town of New Portage in 1860. It was replaced by the Erie Depot built in the new town to the west, which is Barberton.

Theodore Roosevelt and William Howard Taft made whistle-stop tours visiting the Erie Depot while they were campaigning for office. In 1921, at the death of Warren G. Harding, the funeral cortege stopped in Barberton at the Erie Depot so that mourners could view the casket.

On February 3, 1896, Anna Laura Barber married Dr. Arthur Dean Bevan at the Barberton Inn. The honeymoon couple left Barberton at 1:30 am on February 4, 1896, on a special train held at the Erie Depot to take the couple back to Chicago, where Dr. Bevan practiced medicine. Inventor of a surgical technique called the "Bevan button", Arthur Dean Bevan was a renowned surgeon and personal physician to Theodore Roosevelt; he was also president of the American Medical Association.

The buildings of the Diamond Machine (still standing on Second Street in Barberton) hosted, at different times, special envoys sent to Barberton by Kaiser Wilhelm of Germany and his cousin, Czar Nicholas of Russia. These special envoys arrived in Barberton via the Erie Railroad and were met with great fanfare by O. C. Barber and other officers of the Diamond Match at the Erie Depot. The envoys had come to Barberton to see special new match making equipment fabricated by Diamond Machine for use in Diamond Match plants worldwide. Diamond Match controlled 85% of the U.S. match trade and 1/5 of the world's match production. Diamond's largest plant was in Barberton, Ohio.

During March 1914, 200 Mongolian pheasants arrived at the Erie Depot headed to the Anna Dean Farm. These were the first pheasants to be introduced in Ohio.

In 1915 the Liberty Bell passed by the Erie Depot while traveling on to the Panama Pacific Exposition. Along the way the Liberty Bell made several stops, although the train did not stop in Barberton.

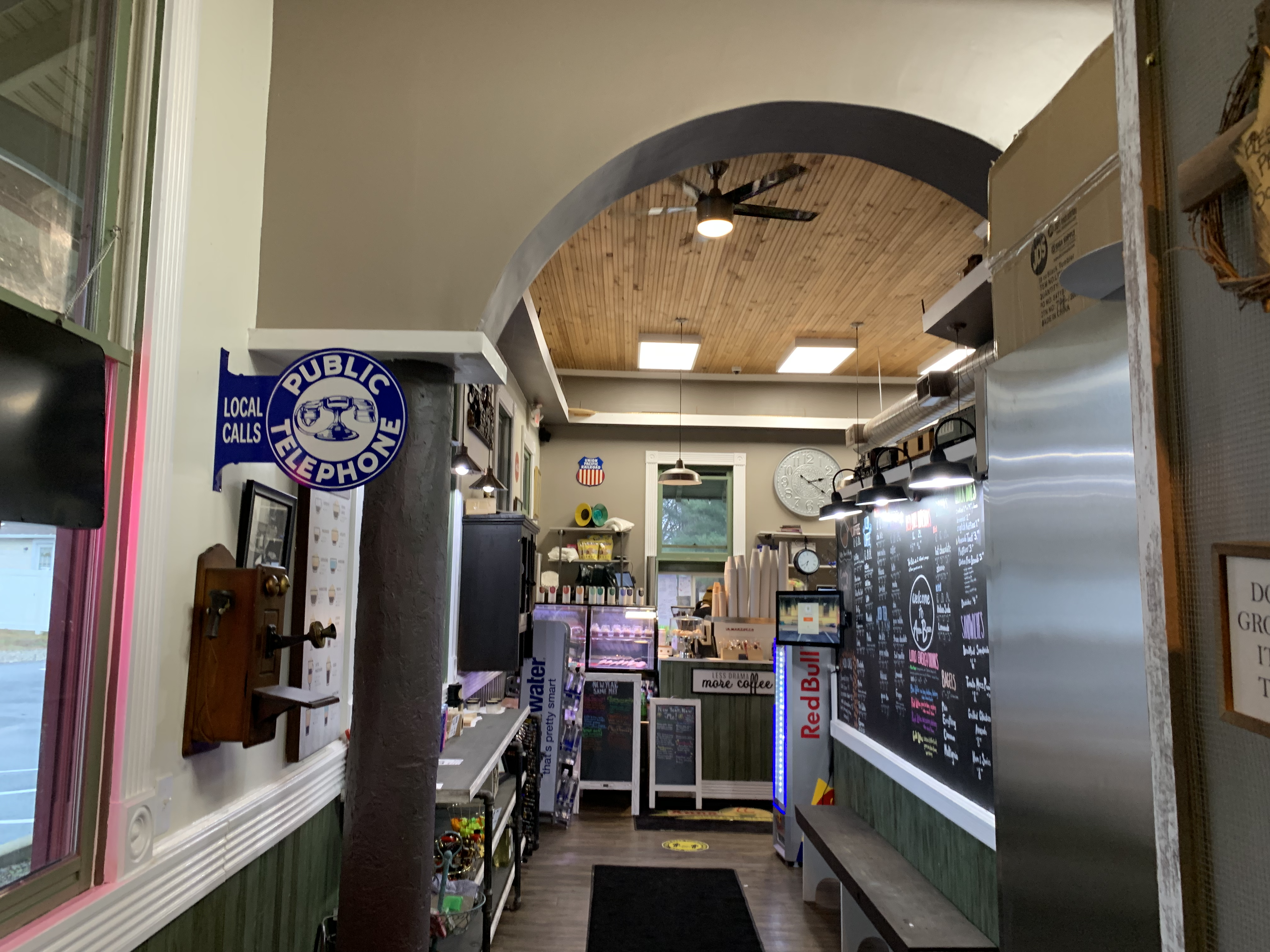
Interior of Anna Bean Coffee Company, January 2023

"Moby Dick is Coming to Town", large ads in the local paper invited Barbertonians to view the 68 ton whale on exhibit at the Erie Depot. The exhibit was open 24 hours and cost $.25 for adults and $.10 for children. The 55 foot long whale arrived in the 1920s. A special railroad car had been constructed to transport the gigantic whale. Captain Jonathan Barnett accompanied the exhibit and regaled the public with talk of whale lore.

This occurred not by the station but on the Erie line at Fairview crossing. On April 29, 1951, an Erie train and an Ohio National Guard tank crashed. Three guardsmen were killed. The tank and other vehicles had been returning to Barberton from field maneuvers. The convoy was crossing Fairview Avenue when an eastbound Erie passenger train traveling about 60 miles per hour struck the second tank.

=== Restoration ===
The Barberton Historical Society was founded in 1965. In late 2012, it began a fund-raising campaign to acquire the depot and restore it as a visitors center and office for the historical society's use. It is reported that one individual donated $5,000, and the Barberton Community Foundation contributed a further $8,500.

The depot has now been fully restored by the Barberton Historical Society. It is painted in the original Erie color scheme of dark forest green and light sea foam green, with red accents. Although the depot no longer sees a passenger service, it has seen adaptive reuse. From 2016 to 2021, the building housed a restaurant and ice cream shop under the name of The Erie Depot. The Erie Depot served a variety of sandwiches, premium ice cream, and Italian Ice. Since 2022, the building has housed a coffee shop called the Anna Bean Coffee Company.

== See also ==
- Chico, California
- Anna-Dean Farm
