= Lake Anna Park =

Park in Barberton, Ohio

Coordinates: 41°00′54″N 81°36′38″W

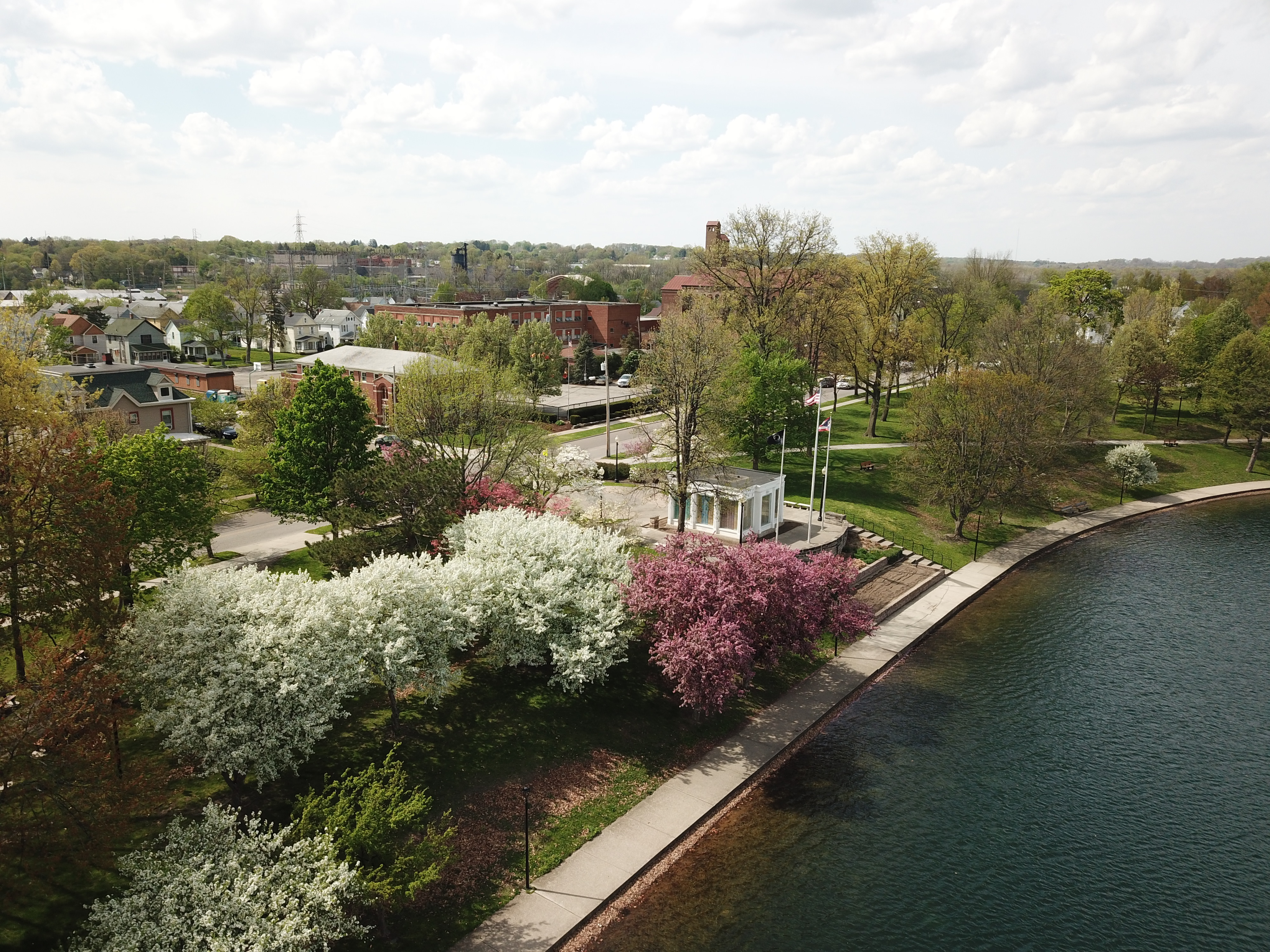
An aerial photo of the Barberton Veteran's Memorial at Lake Anna Park in Barberton, Ohio.

Lake Anna Park is a 21-acre (85,000 m^{2}) park around a spring-fed, 10-acre (40,000 m^{2}) lake, and is located in the center of downtown Barberton, Ohio.

Lake Anna was formed by natural geology, left after the last ice age. It would have long been a resource for varying cultures of indigenous peoples in the area. Ohio Columbus Barber, industrialist and founder of Barberton in 1894, named the lake after his only daughter Anna Laura Barber.

== History ==
In 1891 Barber bought land to build a manufacturing facility for Diamond Matches, and founded the town of Barberton. In addition to developing residential sections, in 1909 he had construction completed on his 52-room, French Renaissance mansion there. It was the center of a complex he called the Anna Dean Farm, again in his daughter's honor. The mansion stood until 1965 and other buildings of the farm's original 35 survive. All but 2 acres (8,100 m^{2}) was redeveloped.

Today the 10-acre (40,000 m^{2}) lake serves as the recreational center of Barberton. Many people come to walk or jog around the 21-acre (85,000 m^{2}) park. The upper walk around Lake Anna is .7 of a mile, while the lower circular walk is .5 of a mile. Lake Anna in Barberton is bordered by Park Ave, Lake Ave, Sixth Street, and Third Street. Things to see at Lake Anna include the gazebo, where many summer band concerts are held; Barberton's War Memorial; and a memorial statue for the founder, O.C. Barber. Parking is around the lake. The park is maintained by the Barberton Parks and Recreation Commission. Lake Anna is open from dawn until 9pm.
