= Barberton chicken =

Serbian-American fried chicken dish

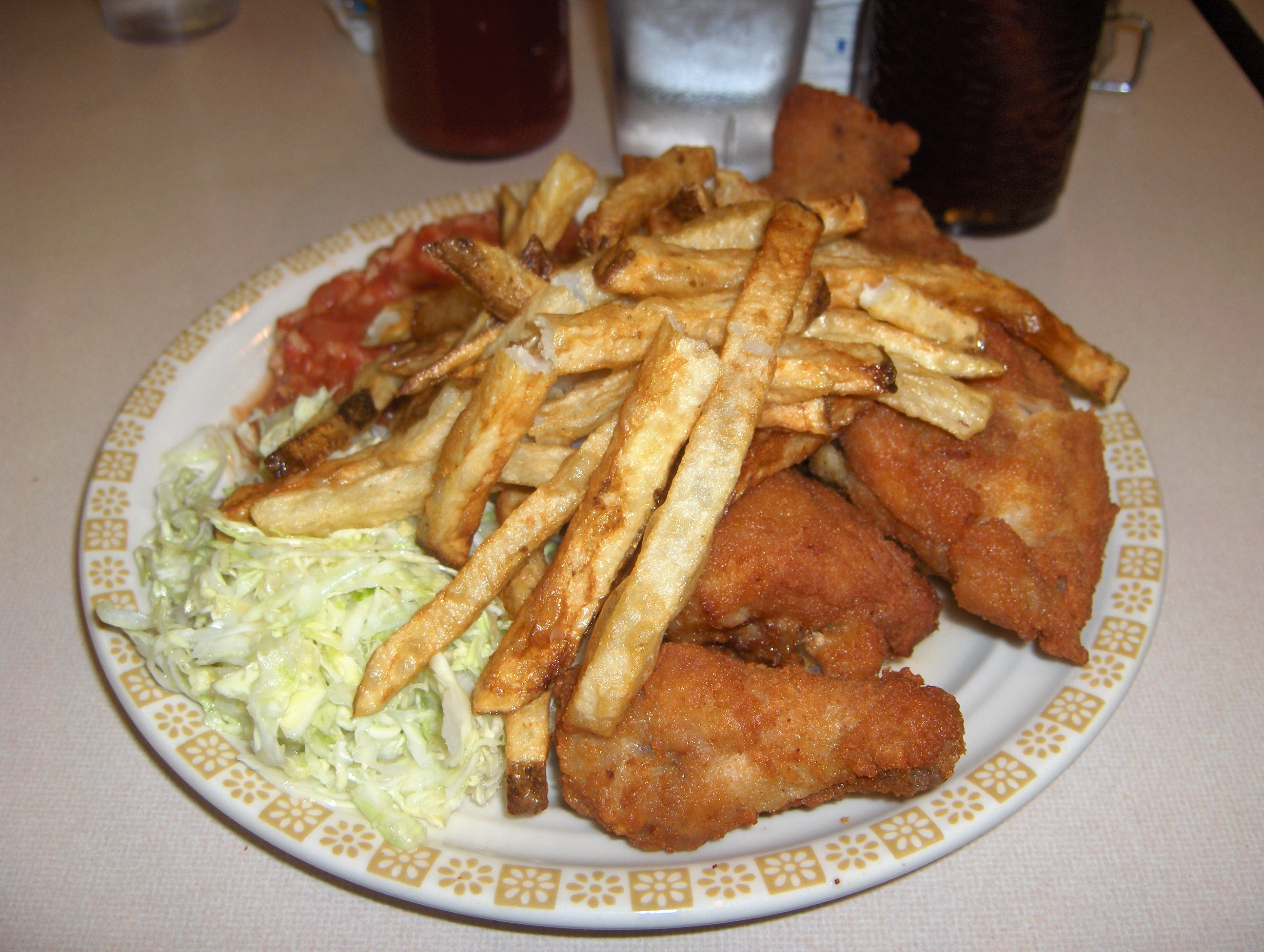
A traditional Barberton chicken dinner with four pieces of fried chicken, coleslaw, hot sauce, and fries served by Milich's Village Inn

Barberton chicken, also known as Serbian fried chicken, is a style of fried chicken native to the city of Barberton in Summit County, Ohio. It is a distinctive Serbian-American style served in several mainly Serbian-owned restaurants in Barberton and nearby Norton and increasingly in other surrounding communities. The style of chicken has given the town national recognition, with some proclaiming Barberton to be the "Chicken Capital of the World" or the "Fried Chicken Capital of America."

== History ==
Barberton chicken began with Michael and Smilka Topalsky, Serbian immigrants who arrived to America at the turn of the 20th century. Like many during the Great Depression, they became burdened with debt and were forced to sell their family farm. They opened a restaurant called Belgrade Gardens in 1933 in which they sold a distinctive style of fried chicken, along with a vinegar-based cabbage cole slaw, a rice and tomato sauce side dish seasoned with hot peppers (usually referred to as "hot sauce" or "hot rice", which can also be eaten as a dipping sauce or a side dish), and freshly cut french fries. Barberton lore holds that these were exact replicas of what the Topalskys had known back in Serbia as pohovana piletina, kupus salata, djuvec, and pomfrit.

Soon other restaurants emerged which copied the distinctive style. Helen DeVore, who had worked for Belgrade Gardens, opened up Hopocan Gardens in 1946. White House Chicken Dinners was founded in 1950 by the Pavkov family, who owned the restaurant until the late 1980s when they sold it to the DeVore family. The Serbian-American Milich family opened Milich's Village Inn, in 1955. The Milich family announced in July 2014 that they would close down their restaurant on December 31. A month later, the location reopened under new ownership as Village Inn Chicken, still serving the signature fried poultry.

Today, the four chicken houses serve over seven and a half tons of chicken per week. The chicken has become so popular that it is often shipped around the United States, usually to transplanted Ohioans. White House Chicken has recently expanded into several locations in northeastern Ohio, dropping the traditional sit-down style in favor of a fast food model in the new locations.

== Tenets ==
The basic tenets of Barberton chicken are simple, yet strictly adhered to by the competing restaurants. They are as follows:

- "True" Barberton chicken is fresh, never frozen.
- Neither the chicken nor the breading is seasoned with anything, except a little salt.
- The birds are fried in lard.
- The cut of the bird is different from usual. Birds are cut into many pieces, including breasts, thighs, legs, wings, drummettes, and backs. This is probably rooted in the Great Depression, when creating the most pieces per chicken without yielding any waste was necessary. The backs actually yield little meat, and are sometimes marketed as "chicken ribs" for their passing resemblance to beef or pork ribs.

== See also ==
- Karadjordje's schnitzel
- Fried chicken
