= Howard E. Woodford =

- Born: June 21, 1921; Barberton, Ohio
- Died: June 7, 1945 (aged 23); Luzon, Philippines
- Burial place: Greenlawn Memorial Park, Akron, Ohio
- Military career
- Allegiance: United States of America
- Branch: United States Army
- Rank: Staff Sergeant
- Units: Company I, 130th Infantry, 33d Infantry Division
- Conflicts: World War II
- Awards: Medal of Honor; Purple Heart

Howard E. Woodford (June 21, 1921 – June 7, 1945) was a soldier in the United States Army who received the Medal of Honor in World War II during actions in the campaign to recapture the Philippines from Japanese forces in 1945. He was killed in action while helping a Filipino guerrilla battalion repulse enemy forces.

He is buried in Akron, Ohio.

== Medal of Honor citation ==
Woodford, Howard E.
Rank and organization:Staff Sergeant, U.S. Army, Company I, 130th Infantry, 33d Infantry Division
Place and date: Near Tabio, Luzon, Philippine Islands, June 6, 1945
Entered service at:Barberton, Ohio
Citation:

He volunteered to investigate the delay in a scheduled attack by an attached guerrilla battalion. Reaching the line of departure, he found that the lead company, in combat for the first time, was immobilized by intense enemy mortar, machinegun, and rifle fire which had caused casualties to key personnel. Knowing that further failure to advance would endanger the flanks of adjacent units, as well as delay capture of the objective, he immediately took command of the company, evacuated the wounded, reorganized the unit under fire, and prepared to attack. He repeatedly exposed himself to draw revealing fire from the Japanese strongpoints, and then moved forward with a 5-man covering force to determine exact enemy positions. Although intense enemy machinegun fire killed 2 and wounded his other 3 men, S/Sgt. Woodford resolutely continued his patrol before returning to the company. Then, against bitter resistance, he guided the guerrillas up a barren hill and captured the objective, personally accounting for 2 hostile machinegunners and courageously reconnoitering strong defensive positions before directing neutralizing fire. After organizing a perimeter defense for the night, he was given permission by radio to return to his battalion, but, feeling that he was needed to maintain proper control, he chose to remain with the guerrillas. Before dawn the next morning the enemy launched a fierce suicide attack with mortars, grenades, and small-arms fire, and infiltrated through the perimeter. Though wounded by a grenade, S/Sgt. Woodford remained at his post calling for mortar support until bullets knocked out his radio. Then, seizing a rifle he began working his way around the perimeter, encouraging the men until he reached a weak spot where 2 guerrillas had been killed. Filling this gap himself, he fought off the enemy. At daybreak he was found dead in his foxhole, but 37 enemy dead were lying in and around his position. By his daring, skillful, and inspiring leadership, as well as by his gallant determination to search out and kill the enemy, S/Sgt. Woodford led an inexperienced unit in capturing and securing a vital objective, and was responsible for the successful continuance of a vitally important general advance.

== Namesake ==
A transport ship was named in his honor the Sgt. Howard E. Woodford. Woodford elementary school in Barberton, Ohio, is also named in his honor.

== See also ==
- List of Medal of Honor recipients
- List of Medal of Honor recipients for World War II
