= Limbach Block Historic District =

Historic district in Ohio, United States

- U.S. National Register of Historic Places
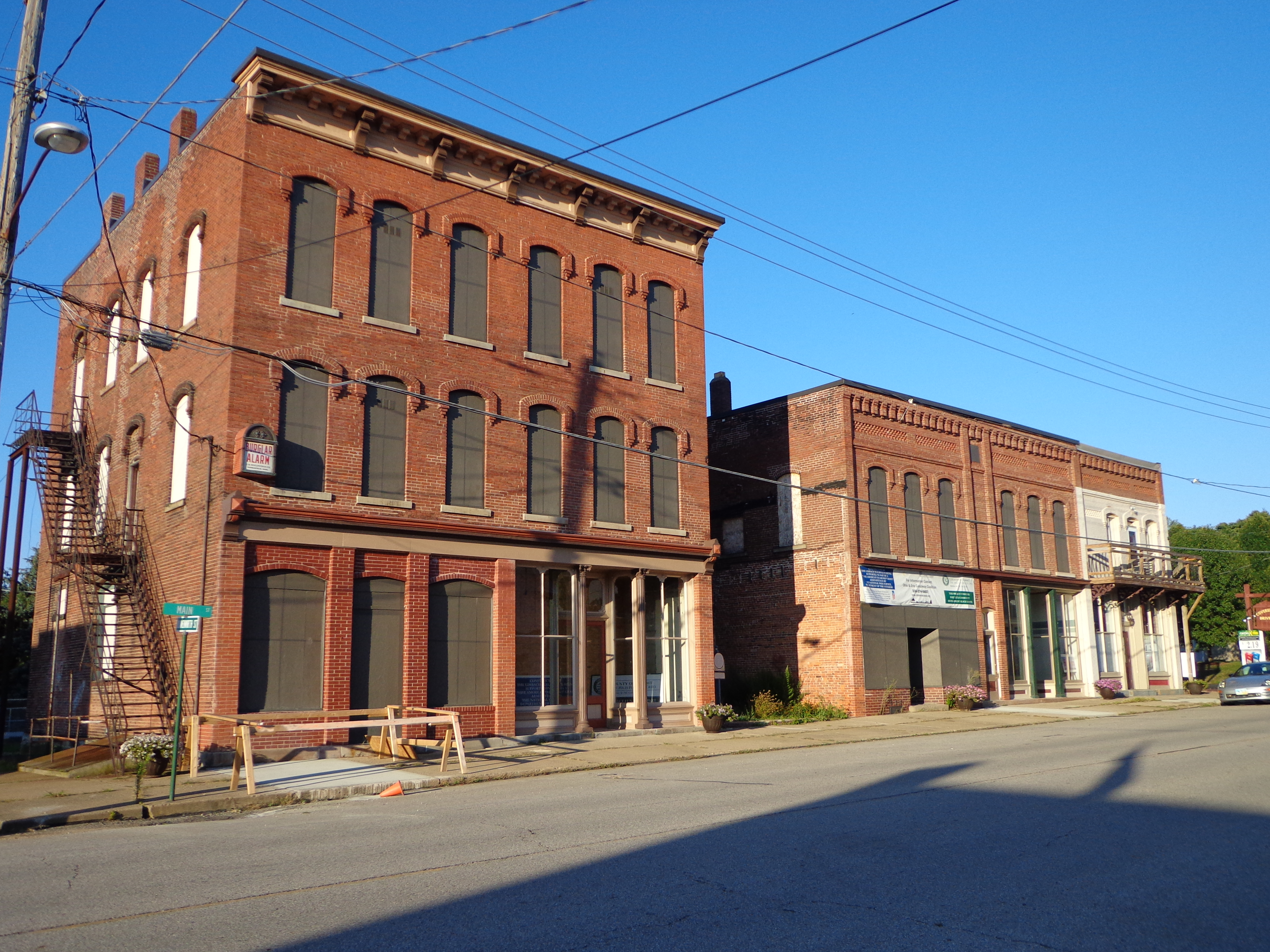

- Location within Ohio Location within the United States
- Location: 7843, 7845, 7847, 7849, 7851, and 7853 Main St., Clinton, Ohio
- Coordinates: 40°55′38″N 81°37′48″W
- Area: 0.5 acres (0.20 ha)
- MPS: Canal, Railroad, and Industrial Resources of the Village of Clinton/Warwick, Ohio MPS
- NRHP reference No.: 01001280
- Added to NRHP: November 29, 2001

The Limbach Block refers to the retail center of the village of Clinton in Summit County, Ohio located on Main Street. The National Park Service listed the Limbach Block Historic District on the National Register of Historic Places on November 29, 2001. The anchor business of the Limbach Block was the Limbach Brothers Shoe Manufacturing Company owned by Martin, Adam, and Jacob Limbach. According to the 1880 U.S. Census Products of Industry, the Limbach Brothers business was worth $8,900 and produced $500 worth of shoes and boots, indicating it was the most valuable business in the village.

In 1874, the Limbach Brothers, local shoemakers, acquired Lots 19 and 20 of Main Street. In 1875, county tax records indicate the Limbachs razed a structure on Lot 20 and in the summer of 1877 began construction on a three-story Block building on Lot 20 that would serve as their factory and retail outlet into the early 20th century. The Limbachs expanded their operation in 1899 when they acquired Lot 18 from Franklin Maranville, a tinsmith. In 1903, Martin Limbach et al incorporated the Clinton Savings Bank and housed the operation in a corner of the Limbach Shoe Store.
