= Barber, California =

Barber
- Neighborhood of Chico
- Location in California
- Coordinates: 39°42′53″N 121°50′08″W
- Country: United States
- State: California
- County: Butte County
- City: Chico
- Elevation: 190 ft (58 m)

The Barber Neighborhood is a working class residential neighborhood in Chico, California, generally south of Little Chico Creek and west of Park avenue. The Barber Neighborhood Association represents the interests of the neighborhood to the community. This neighborhood was originally the settlement of Barber, California built to house the employees of the adjacent Diamond Match Factory. The neighborhood was named after Ohio Columbus Barber, president of the Diamond Match Company. The neighborhood lies at an elevation of 190 feet (58 m). Today, the area is entirely within the city limits of Chico, and the Diamond Match property is designated for a future development called Barber Yard. Some of the notable and historic structures in the neighborhood are:

- Arthur Lammers House
- Clough Home
- E.D. Sharp Home
- Fatima Club
- J.E. Hibbert House
- Perley Home
- Redeemer Lutheran Church

== Developments ==
- Pine Tree Apartments
- Creekside Manor Apartments
- Oakdale Apartments

== See also ==
- South Campus Neighborhood
- Chapmantown
