= Francis D. Alling House =

Historic house in Ohio, United States

- U.S. National Register of Historic Places
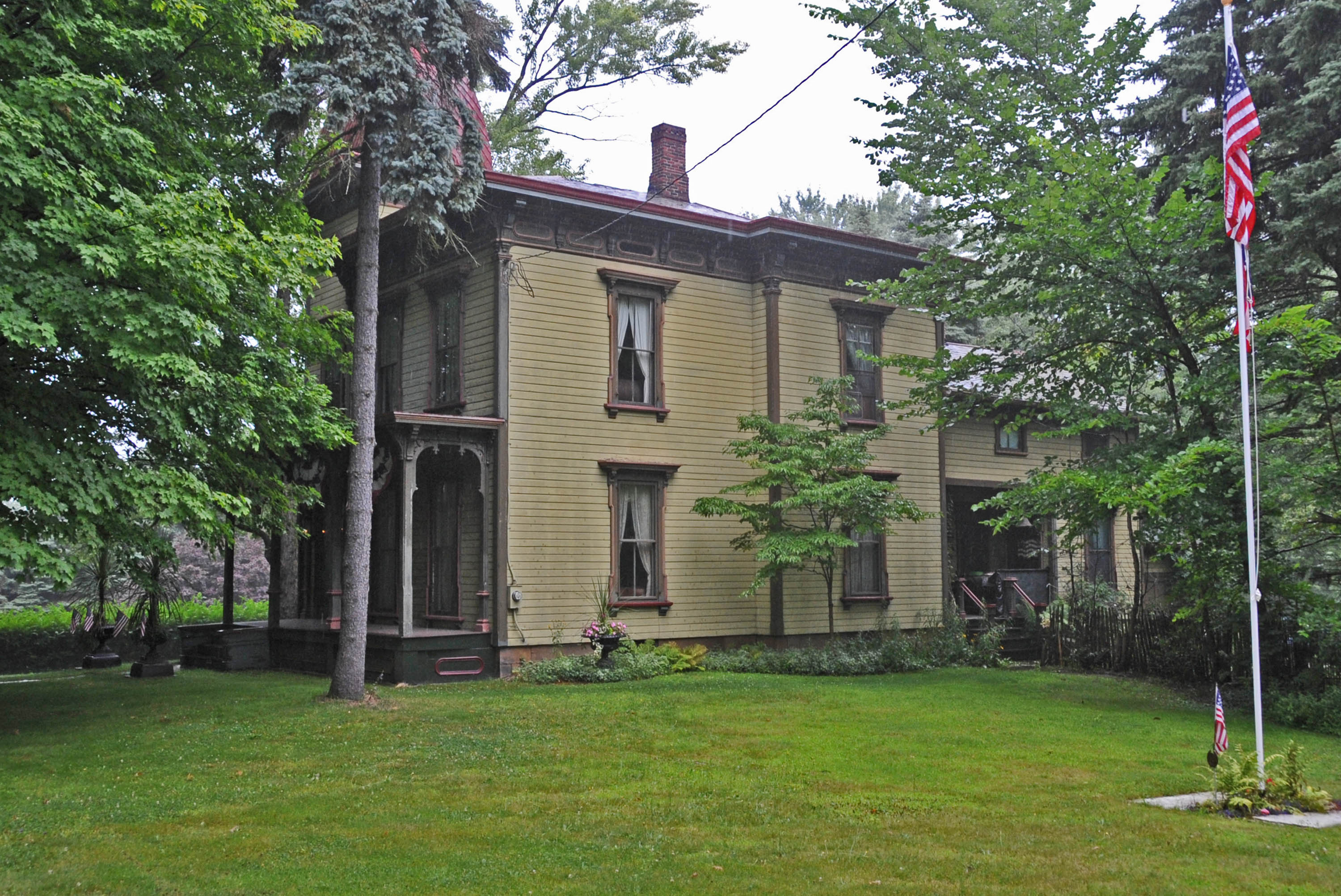

- Location within Ohio Location within the United States
- Location: 323 East Ave., Tallmadge, Ohio
- Coordinates: 41°6′4.52″N 81°25′43.63″W
- Architect: Francis Drake Alling
- Architectural style: Italianate
- NRHP reference No.: 87002093
- Added to NRHP: 1987-11-30

The Francis D. Alling House is a historic house at 323 East Avenue in Tallmadge, Ohio. Owner Francis D. Alling, a local builder and craftsman, built the house for himself in 1875 after living in an older house on the property for over a decade. Alling designed the house in the Italianate style, which he also used for several other houses in the area. The two-story house features a tower at its southeast corner which reaches a story above the main house and is topped by a mansard roof. The house's design also includes a full front porch with a bracketed cornice, a projecting bay, and bracketed eaves. Three outbuildings are present on the property: a bank barn that predates the house, an outhouse, and a modern garage.

The house was listed in the National Register on November 30, 1987.
