= Twinsburg Congregational Church =

Historic church in Ohio, United States

- U.S. National Register of Historic Places
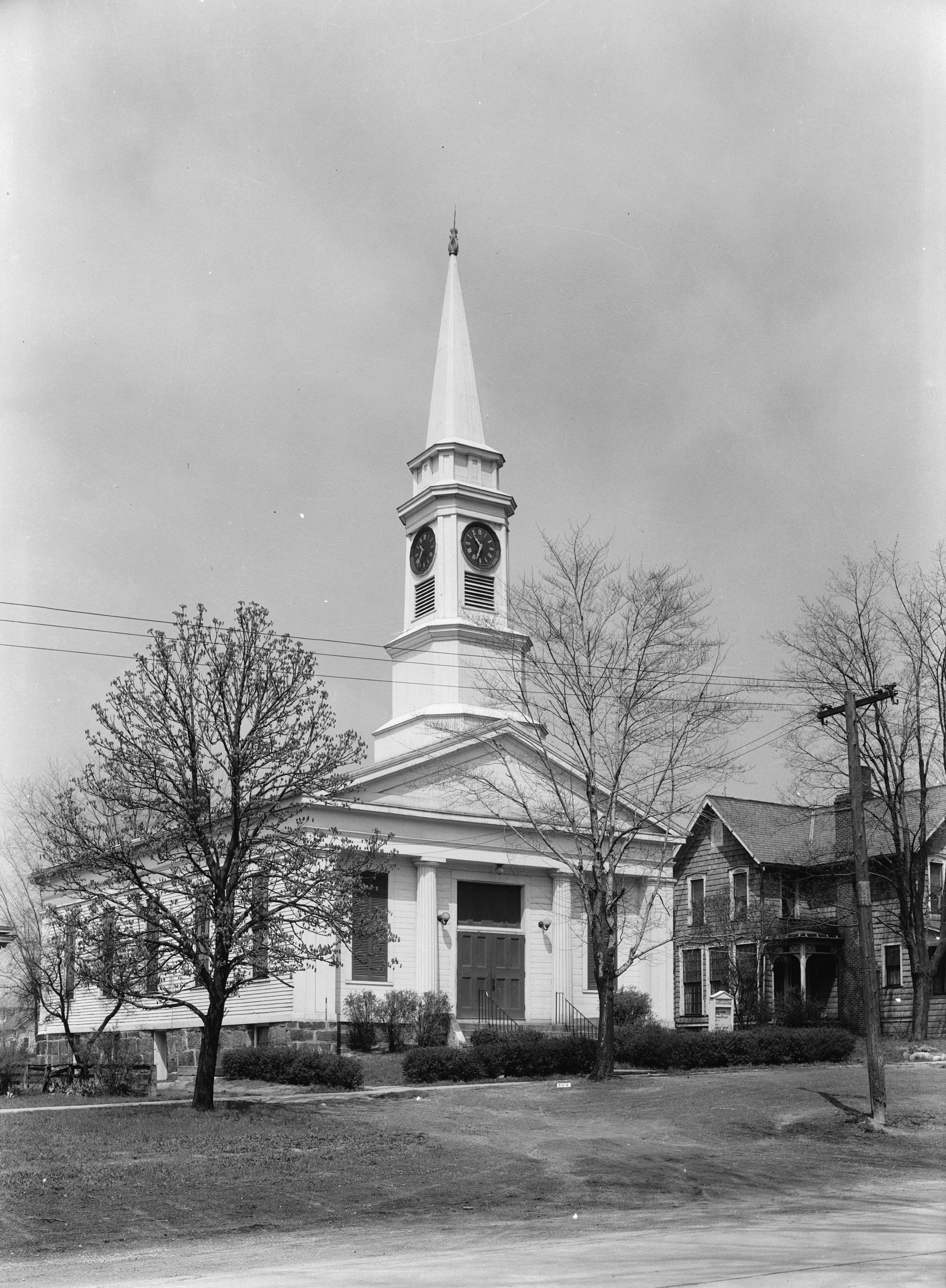

- Location within Ohio Location within the United States
- Location: Twinsburg Public Sq., Twinsburg, Ohio
- Coordinates: 41°18′43″N 81°26′32″W
- Area: less than one acre
- Built: 1848
- Architectural style: Greek Revival
- NRHP reference No.: 74001634
- Added to NRHP: May 3, 1974

The Twinsburg Congregational Church is a historic church building located on the southwest quadrant of the Twinsburg Public Square in Twinsburg, Ohio. It is a prominent and well-preserved local example of the Greek Revival style prevalent throughout the Western Reserve region during the mid-19th century.

Constructed in 1848, the building was formally added to the National Register of Historic Places (NRHP) in 1974 for its architectural distinction and long-standing historical importance to the community's development. The building serves as the home of the First Congregational Church, United Church of Christ, an active congregation since 1822.

== History ==
=== Origins and Challenges ===
The religious community that would later erect the First Congregational Church building was formally constituted in 1822. The organization's roots lie in the efforts of New England settlers who had migrated to the former Connecticut Western Reserve. For nearly twenty-five years, the congregation lacked a permanent sanctuary, moving between private homes, the upper level of the local gristmill, and, starting in 1822, a log school house on the public square.

Initial attempts to secure a dedicated building were thwarted by local ordinance. A frame church and school were constructed directly on the public square, but town representatives ruled that construction on the square was illegal, leading to the structure's removal. A subsequent structure built in the 1830s near the square served the community temporarily until the final, definitive building could be erected.

=== The 1848 Edifice and Financing ===
The present Greek Revival building was finally completed and dedicated in 1848 at its current location on the square, establishing a permanent landmark. The construction cost was approximately $3,300, a major local investment. The funds were raised primarily through the widely accepted 19th-century practice of selling or renting pews to members. This system not only financed the building but also created an early social structure within the congregation, as wealthier families generally purchased pews in the most prominent locations.

A notable incident occurred around 1856 or 1857 when the building's distinctive steeple detached during a windstorm. It was subsequently repaired and permanently secured.

=== Later Modifications and Community Role ===
For the convenience of its members, the property originally featured horse shelters or stables at the rear of the lot for the horses and carriages used for transport. As the automobile replaced equine transportation, these shelters were dismantled in the mid-1920s and the space was briefly used for storage. This storage facility was later demolished to make way for a much-needed modern addition for classrooms and Sunday School in 1954, the most significant modification to the structure's footprint. This addition allowed the church to expand its educational and outreach programs to accommodate the mid-century population boom in the area.

Beyond its religious services, the church historically functioned as a central public space. During the 19th century, it often served as a venue for town meetings, lectures, and community events, cementing its role as a civic hub before specialized government buildings were constructed.

== Architecture ==
The Twinsburg Congregational Church is recognized as one of the best examples of Greek Revival architecture in Summit County. This style, which sought to replicate the features of classical Greek temples, was highly favored in Ohio's Western Reserve due to its association with democratic ideals and permanence.

Portico and Pediment: The main facade is dominated by a substantial full portico supported by classical columns, topped by a large triangular pediment. This arrangement instantly invokes the aesthetic of a classical temple.

Material and Form: The building features white clapboard siding, maintaining the clean, pure aesthetic of classical marble. The severe horizontality of the main temple form is contrasted by the verticality of the steeple, which rises from the center of the roofline and incorporates elements of both classical columns and traditional New England meetinghouse spires.

Symmetry: The window and door placements are strictly symmetrical, contributing to the style's overall sense of order and balance.
