= Anna–Dean Farm =

- U.S. National Register of Historic Places
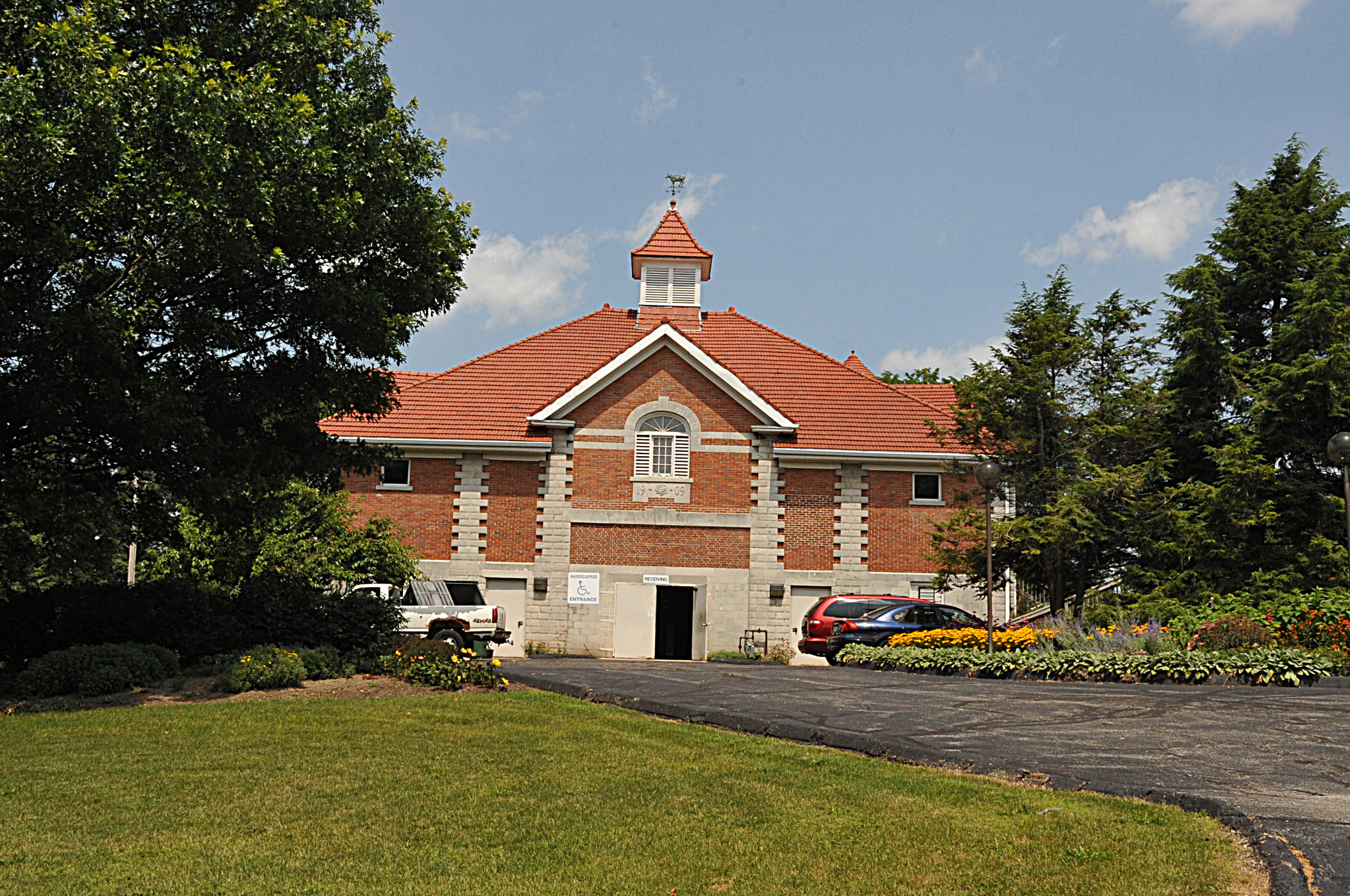

- Location within Ohio Location within the United States
- Location: Barberton, Ohio
- Coordinates: 41°0′24″N 81°37′38″W
- Built: 1905
- Architect: O.C. Barber; Harpster and Bliss
- NRHP reference No.: 77001086
- Added to NRHP: July 14, 1977

The Anna–Dean Farm is a historic farm in Barberton, Ohio, United States. It is listed on the National Register of Historic Places and is the site of several structures independently listed on the Register.

== History ==
The Anna–Dean farm was a concept of American industrialist O.C. Barber who envisioned a superfarm on the outskirts of Barberton, and to that end he began purchasing land for the eventual 3,500-acre (14 km^{2}) farm as early as 1900.

Construction of the farm facilities began in 1907 with a concrete poultry building but would not truly begin in earnest until 1909 when Barber undertook a massive construction project that would last until 1913. With an estimated daily construction budget of over $1,000 and an overall cost of some $7 million the farm had swelled to a collection of 35 independent structures. While Barber claims in his own book a total of 102 structures it is likely he included in his tally preexisting structures that had been incorporated into the farm during its expansion.

The centerpiece of the farm was the 52 room Beaux Arts style mansion Barber constructed in 1909 to 1910. According to the Barberton Historical Society, it was demolished in 1965.

Following Barber's death in 1920, the majority of the structures on the farm were demolished. Efforts by the Barberton Historical Society have succeeded in preserving and restoring 6 of the original buildings, with 2 others still standing in other private possession.

== Historic sites ==
In addition to the farm itself, the following buildings on the farmstead are individually listed on the National Register of Historic Places:

- O. C. Barber Barn No. 1
- O. C. Barber Colt Barn
- O. C. Barber Creamery
- O. C. Barber Machine Barn
- O. C. Barber Piggery

== Resources ==
- "Ohio Columbus Barber – America's Match King" by W. F. Flemming
- "Anna Dean Farm, The Story of an American Farm" by Ohio C. Barber
- "O.C. Barber's Home and Farm in Photos." by Henrietta Vietta
- "Anna Dean Farm, A Centennial Remembrance" (video) by Tim Young,
