= Clinton, Ohio =

- Village
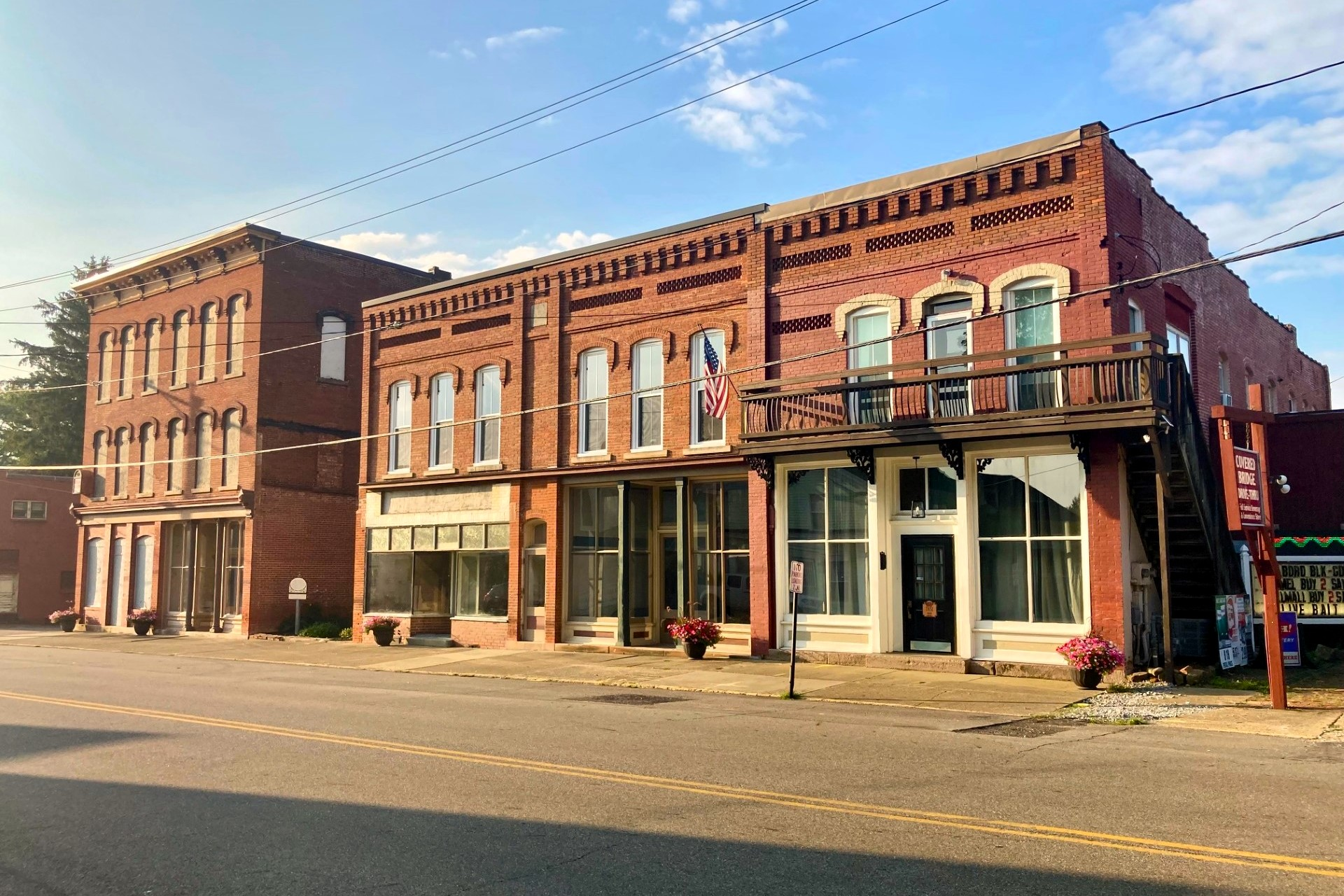
- Downtown Clinton, Ohio

- Location in Summit County and the state of Ohio.
- Coordinates: 40°55′42″N 81°37′22″W
- Country: United States
- State: Ohio
- County: Summit

Area
  - Total: 3.68 sq mi (9.52 km^{2})
  - Land: 3.59 sq mi (9.29 km^{2})
  - Water: 0.089 sq mi (0.23 km^{2})
- Elevation: 945 ft (288 m)

Population (2020)
  - Total: 1,197
  - Estimate (2023): 1,189
  - Density: 333.7/sq mi (128.84/km^{2})
- Time zone: UTC-5 (Eastern (EST))
  - Summer (DST): UTC-4 (EDT)
- ZIP code: 44216
- Area code: 330
- FIPS code: 39-16182
- GNIS feature ID: 1086998
- Website: https://clintonoh.gov/

Clinton is a village in southwestern Summit County, Ohio, United States. The population was 1,197 at the 2020 Census. It is part of the Akron metropolitan area.

== History ==
Clinton was originally called Savannah, and under the latter name was laid out in 1816.

== Geography ==
Clinton is located along the Tuscarawas River.

According to the United States Census Bureau, the village has a total area of 3.64 square miles (9.43 km^{2}), of which 3.55 square miles (9.19 km^{2}) is land and 0.09 square miles (0.23 km^{2}) is water.

== Demographics ==
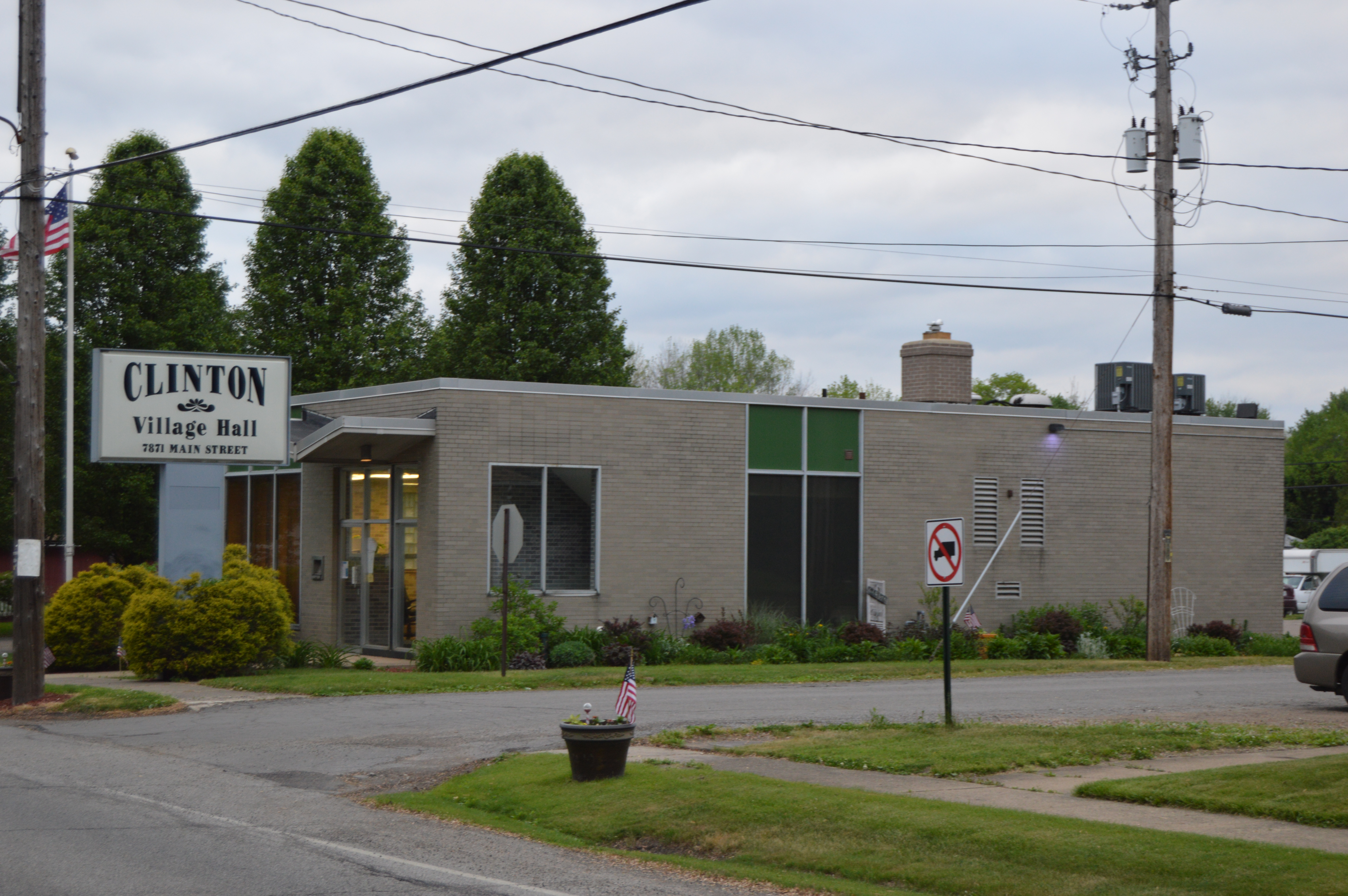
Clinton Village Hall

Historical population
Census	Pop.	Note	%±
1910	305		—
1920	312		2.3%
1930	404		29.5%
1940	367		−9.2%
1950	397		8.2%
1960	924		132.7%
1970	1,335		44.5%
1980	1,277		−4.3%
1990	1,175		−8.0%
2000	1,337		13.8%
2010	1,214		−9.2%
2020	1,197		−1.4%
2023 (est.)	1,189	▼	−0.7%
U.S. Decennial Census

=== 2020 census ===
According to the 2020 Census, Clinton had 1,197 people and 460 households. The population density was 333.4 inhabitants per square mile (128.7/km^{2}). There were 550 housing units at an average density of 153.2 units per square mile (59.2 units/km^{2}). The racial makeup of the village was:

- 93.2% White,
- 0.7% African American,
- 0.2% Native American,
- 0.3% Asian,
- 0.5% Hispanic or Latino
- 0.2% from other races, and
- 5.3% from two or more races. of any race were 0.7% of the population.

There were 460 households, 51.3% were married couples living together, 5.6% had a female householder with no husband present, 4.1% had a male householder with no wife present. The average household size was 2.93 and the average family size was 2.9.

The median age in the village was 51.9 years. 15.8% of residents were under age 18; 5.9% were between 18 and 24; 37.9% were 45 to 64; and 22.7% were 65 or older.

=== 2010 census ===
According to the 2010 Census, there were 1,214 people, 471 households, and 345 families residing in Clinton. The population density was 342.0 inhabitants per square mile (132.0/km^{2}). There were 535 housing units at an average density of 150.7 units per square mile (58.2 units/km^{2}). The racial makeup of the village was 97.5% White, 0.3% African American, 0.2% Native American, 0.3% Asian, 0.2% from other races, and 1.3% from two or more races. Hispanic or Latino of any race were 0.7% of the population.

There were 471 households, of which 31.0% had children under the age of 18 living with them, 58.4% were married couples living together, 7.6% had a female householder with no husband present, 7.2% had a male householder with no wife present, and 26.8% were non-families. 21.4% of all households were made up of individuals, and 7.9% had someone living alone who was 65 years of age or older. The average household size was 2.58 and the average family size was 2.98.

The median age in the village was 43.1 years. 21.4% of residents were under age 18; 9% were between 18 and 24; 22.5% were 25 to 44; 33.8% were 45 to 64; and 13.3% were 65 or older. The gender makeup of the village was 51.6% male and 48.4% female.

=== 2000 census ===
According to the 2000 Census, there were 1,337 people, 496 households, and 380 families residing in the village. The population density was 376.2 inhabitants per square mile (145.3/km^{2}). There were 528 housing units at an average density of 148.6 units per square mile (57.4 units/km^{2}). The racial makeup of the village was 97.68% White, 0.37% African American, 0.15% Native American, 0.45% Asian, 0.22% from other races, and 1.12% from two or more races. Hispanic or Latino of any race were 0.37% of the population.

There were 496 households, out of which 34.1% had children under the age of 18 living with them, 66.3% were married couples living together, 7.7% had a female householder with no husband present, and 23.2% were non-families. 19.8% of all households were made up of individuals, and 9.1% had someone living alone who was 65 years of age or older. The average household size was 2.69 and the average family size was 3.12.

In the village, the population was spread out, with 25.4% under age 18, 8.2% from 18 to 24, 29.9% from 25 to 44, 25.2% from 45 to 64, and 11.3% who were 65 years old or older. The median age was 37 years. For every 100 females there were 103.5 males. For every 100 females age 18 and over, there were 96.5 males.

The median income for a household was $49,353, and the median income for a family was $53,438. Males had a median income of $38,047 versus $26,250 for females. The per capita income for the village was $23,063. About 3.6% of families and 4.9% of the population were below the poverty line, including 7.0% of those under age 18 and 6.4% of those age 65 or over.
