= Diamond Match Company =

American wood products manufacturer

- Formerly: Swift & Courtney; Barber Match Company; Diamond Gardner; Diamond International
- Industry: Wood products
- Founded: 1853; 173 years ago
- Founder: Edward Tatnall
- Headquarters: United States
- Key people: William H. Swift, Henry Courtney, O. C. Barber
- Products: Matches, toothpicks, fire starters
- Parent: Jefferson Smurfit (1983–1998); Seaver Kent (1998–2003); Jarden (2003–2016); Newell Brands (2016–2017); Royal Oak Enterprises (since 2017)

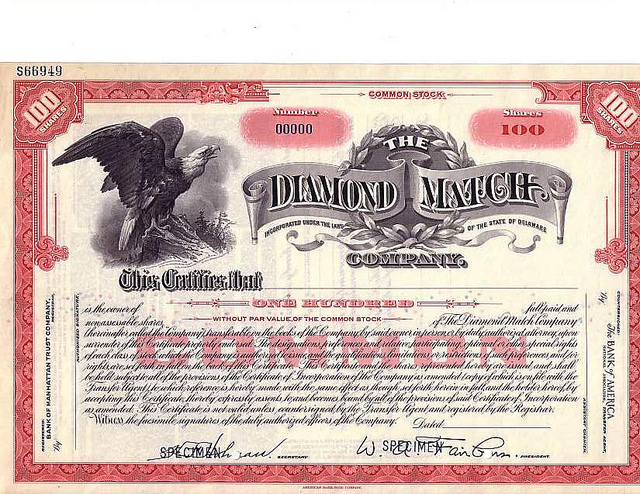
The Diamond Match Company, Stock Certificate, Specimen, circa Great Depression Era

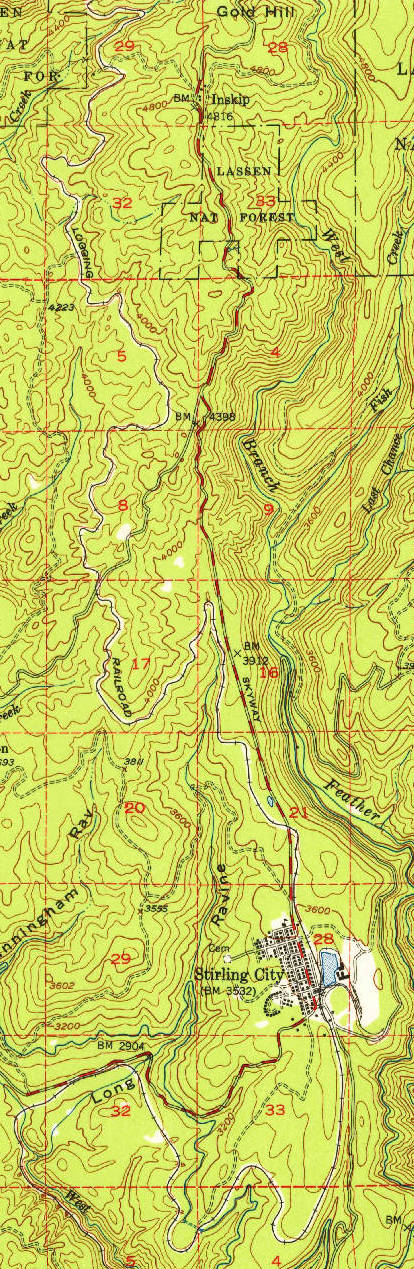
Logging railway north of Stirling City, California with Southern Pacific connection to the south

The Diamond Match Company is a brand of matches and toothpicks, and formerly other wood products and plastic cutlery, that has its roots in a business started in 1853 by Edward Tatnall in Wilmington, Delaware. Ownership passed to William H. Swift and Henry Courtney who operated under the name Swift & Courtney and marketed their product as Diamond State Parlor Matches.

Experiencing a boost in business during the American Civil War, Swift & Courtney would acquire other match manufacturers to become the largest match company in the United States. Swift & Courtney was acquired by O. C. Barber in 1880 who rebranded the company Diamond in 1881. Under Barber's ownership, the company would play a major role in developing the city of Barberton, Ohio and spawn the Diamond Rubber Company.

Throughout the twentieth century, Diamond would expand into the forestry business and manufacture other wood and paper products including cotton swabs, ice cream sticks, toothpicks, paper plates, and playing cards. Most of these businesses were divested following the company's 1982 acquisition by James Goldsmith. The match business would continue under the name Diamond Match Company and has been owned by Royal Oak Enterprises since 2017.

== Tatnall ==
In the early 1850s, Edward Tatnall of Wilmington, Delaware was given an English recipe for making matches by a business acquaintance, William R. Smith. In 1853, Tatnall attempted to turn the recipe into a business at Market Street Bridge over Brandywine Creek in Wilmington. The first matches ignited with the slightest friction, a problem Tatnall solved by reducing the phosphorus content by 25 percent.

== Courtney ==
In the next few years, Tatnall was joined by a young Englishman, Henry Coughtrey, who was an experienced match maker, and who changed his name to Courtney. During a business depression in 1857, Tatnall closed his plant, but Courtney continued to experiment with improvements to the safety and quality of his own matches. In 1860, William H. Swift joined Tatnall’s firm to provide clerical and financial services. Though Swift saw potential in Courtney’s innovations, Tatnall felt he had spent enough on the match business and turned the business over to Courtney and Swift for nothing. In 1861, the two of them created the Swift & Courtney Company. They called their new matches Diamond State Parlor Matches, using one of the popular nicknames for the state of Delaware.

Demand during the Civil War created a large and growing market for Swift & Courtney matches. In order to meet an expanding need for production even after the Civil War, the company merged with Beecher & Sons of New Haven, Connecticut in 1870 to create the Swift & Courtney & Beecher Company. Incorporated in Connecticut, manufacturing remained in Wilmington, Delaware. Later in 1870, the company purchased the match business of Thomas Allen & Company of St. Louis, Missouri. In 1872, they bought McGiugan & Daily of Philadelphia, and made contracts with Joseph Loehy of New York City and Charles Busch of Trenton, New Jersey.

== Barber ==
In 1880, everything was sold to the Barber Match Company of Akron, Ohio, founded by O.C. Barber. Barber re-named the company after the established trade name of its product, creating the Diamond Match Company. Following the Panic of 1893, Barber moved the Diamond Match Company factory in Akron to the adjacent town of his own creation, Barberton. He turned the abandoned Akron match factory into the Diamond Rubber Company factory.

The Diamond Match Company was the largest manufacturer of matches in the United States in the late nineteenth century.

The Diamond Match Company operated plants at Barberton, Ohio; Wilmington, Delaware (now located in the East Brandywine Historic District); Barber, California (now a neighborhood in south Chico, California); Springfield, Massachusetts; Oshkosh, Wisconsin; Oswego, New York, and Cloquet, Minnesota.

In 1932, Ivar Kreuger took control of more than 52% of the shares.

=== Stirling City logging railroads ===
The Diamond Match Company built a wood processing mill in 1902 at Stirling City, California. A 42-mile (68 km) standard gauge railroad was built from Stirling City to their manufacturing plant in Chico for operation by Southern Pacific; and Diamond Match Company also built and operated metre-gauge railway branches to bring logs into Stirling City from surrounding forests. The company became a pioneering user of treated railroad ties by building a tie-manufacturing plant at Stirling City. Later, logging branches were built to standard gauge; and the company was operating three Lima Locomotive Works Shay locomotives and one built by Willamette Iron and Steel Works when the logging branches were abandoned in 1952.

=== Chico Electric Railway ===
Diamond Match Company also built an electrified tram line to transport employees to and from work. The Chico Electric Railway running along 9th Street and Main Street began operations in 1904, and became the northern terminus of the Sacramento Northern Railway in 1906.

== Corporate era ==
Diamond's parent company changed names several times in the mid-twentieth century, first becoming Diamond Gardner in 1957 with the acquisition of Gardner Board and Carton Company, followed by Diamond National in 1959 and Diamond International in 1964. The metal can manufacturer Heekin Can was acquired by Diamond International in 1965. The United States Playing Card Company, makers of Bicycle Playing Cards, was acquired in 1969.

James Goldsmith acquired Diamond International in 1982 and sold off its non-forestry assets. Jefferson Smurfit acquired the Diamond Match Company. Jefferson Smurfit and Clark Enterprises acquired Diamond's packaging, container, paper board, and graphic arts divisions. James River acquired Diamond's pulp and paper business. Wesray Capital acquired Heekin Can. Jesup & Lamont Securities Company acquired the U.S. Playing Card Company. Roseburg Forest Products acquired Diamond's California timberlands.

Goldsmith retained most timberlands formerly owned by Diamond and later acquired the timberlands of Crown Zellerbach, merging the properties into Cavenham Forest Industries. During his ownership, Goldsmith sold parts of the timberlands, including those in Adirondack Park. Goldsmith sold Cavenham to Hanson in 1990 in exchange for a stake in Newmont Mining. Willamette Industries acquired Cavenham from Hanson in 1996.

== Later ownership ==
Private equity firm Seaver Kent acquired Diamond Match Company in 1998. Following Seaver Kent's bankruptcy in 2001, Diamond was purchased by Jarden in 2003. Newell Brands became owner in 2016 after the merger of Jarden with Newell Rubbermaid. In 2017, Newell sold Diamond (except the cutlery line) to Royal Oak Enterprises.

Diamond remains America's leading producer of matches, producing some twelve billion a year. It also produces plastic cutlery and other wood products.
