= Barberton, Ohio =

- City
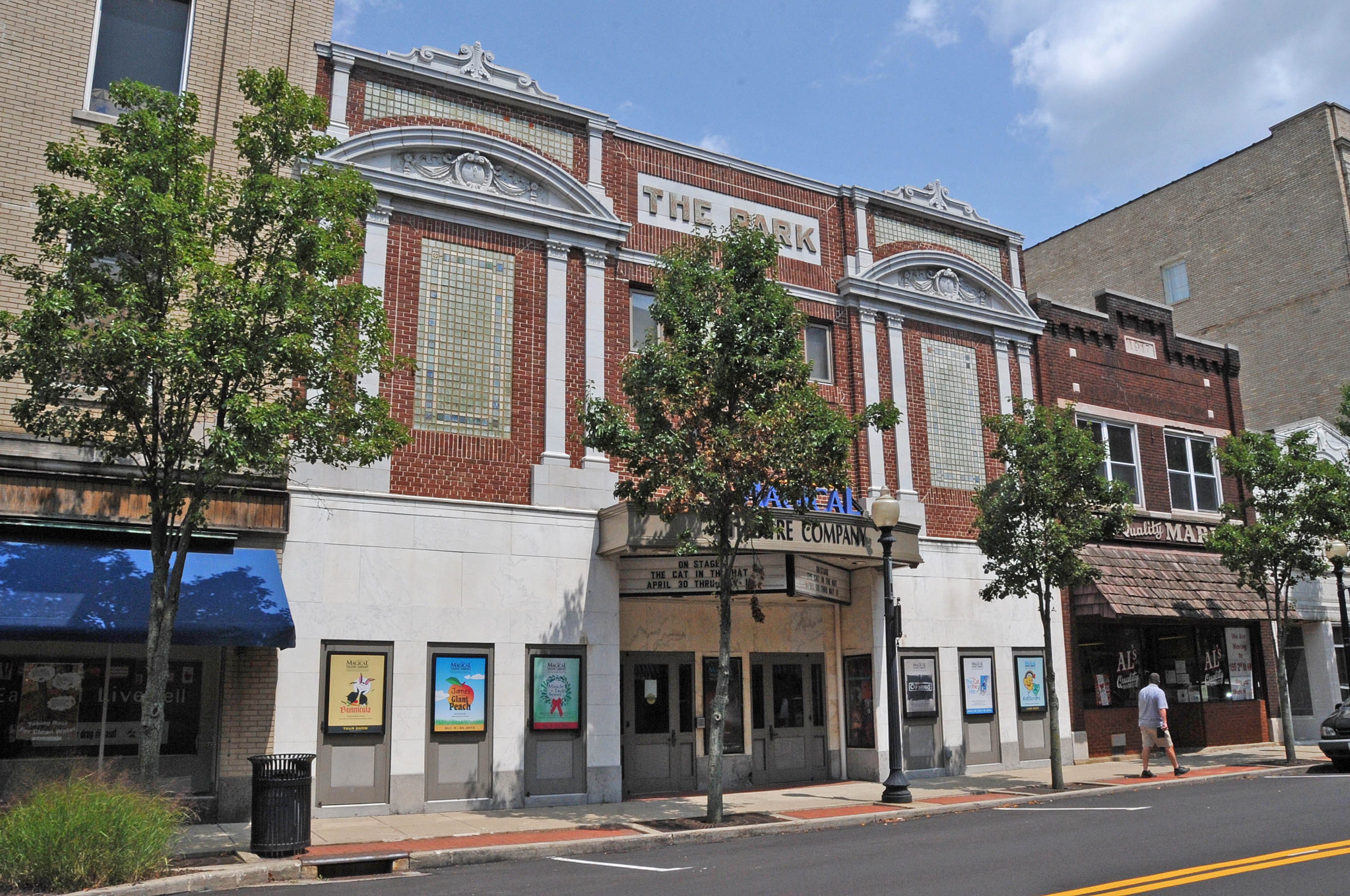
- Buildings in downtown Barberton, 2008
- Nickname: The Magic City
- Interactive map of Barberton, Ohio
- Location within Ohio Location within the United States
- Coordinates: 41°00′20″N 81°37′10″W
- Country: United States
- State: Ohio
- County: Summit

Government
  - Mayor: Shorter Griffin

Area
  - Total: 9.24 sq mi (23.93 km^{2})
  - Land: 9.02 sq mi (23.35 km^{2})
  - Water: 0.22 sq mi (0.57 km^{2})
- Elevation: 958 ft (292 m)

Population (2020)
  - Total: 25,191
  - Estimate (2023): 24,563
  - Density: 2,794/sq mi (1,078.7/km^{2})
- Time zone: UTC-5 (Eastern (EST))
  - Summer (DST): UTC-4 (EDT)
- ZIP Code: 44203
- Area codes: 330, 234
- FIPS code: 39-03828
- GNIS feature ID: 1086994
- Website: www.cityofbarberton.com

Barberton is a city in Summit County, Ohio, United States. The population was 25,191 at the 2020 census. Located directly southwest of Akron, it is a suburb in the Akron metropolitan area.

== History ==
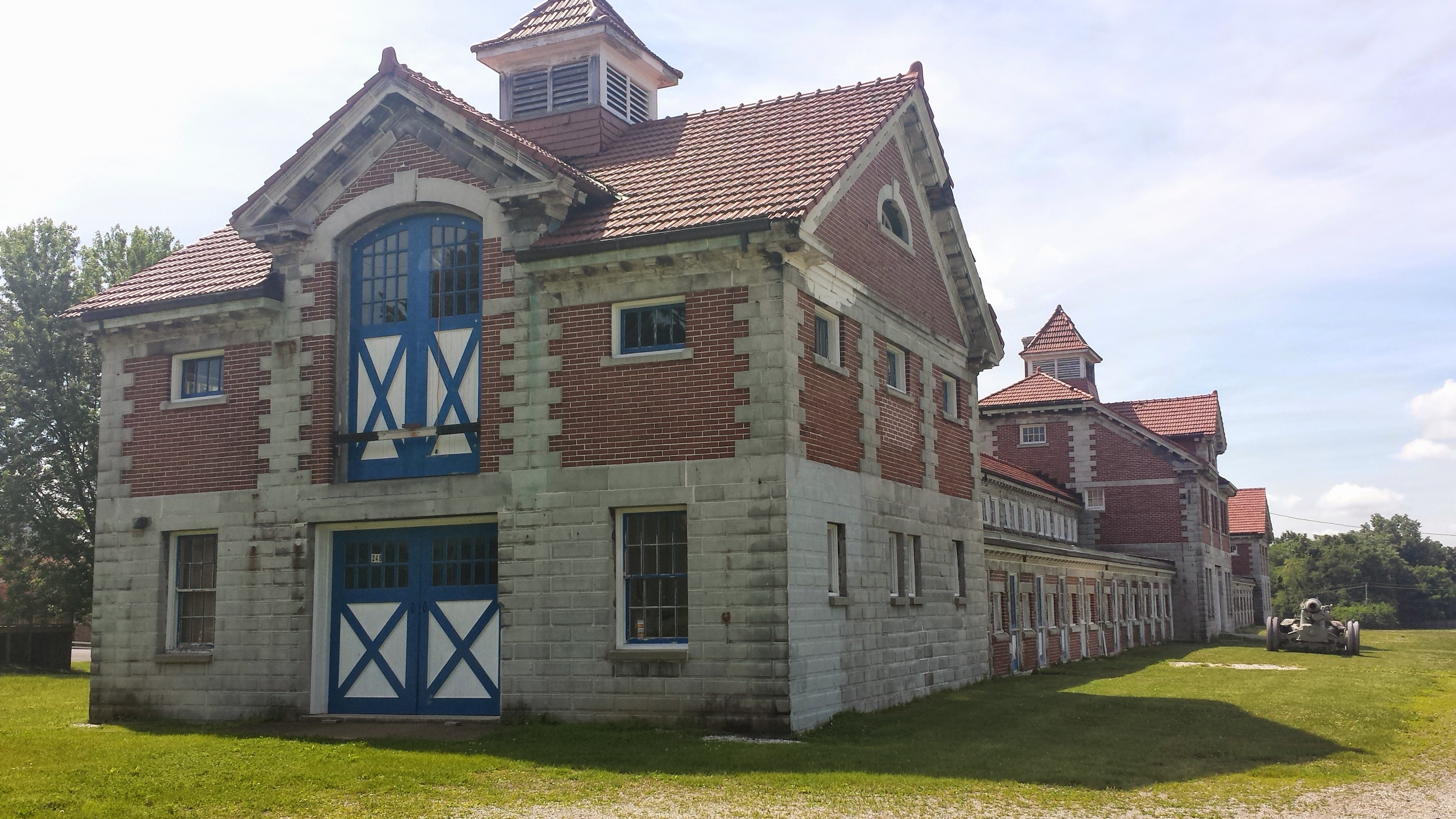
O. C. Barber Piggery

Barberton was founded in 1891 by industrialist O.C. Barber, who planned the town according to his vision of industry, progress and community. In 1894 he moved the manufacturing operations of the Diamond Match Company, which he formed from a merger of 11 companies, from Akron to Barberton. He soon was producing 250 million matches a day. In the valley running parallel to the Tuscarawas River and the Ohio & Erie Canal, he oversaw the construction of factories, residential neighborhoods and a compact commercial downtown. In the center of the new city was Lake Anna, named after Barber's only daughter, Anna Laura Barber.

Barberton became known as the "Magic City" because of its rapid population growth during its formative industrial years, at a time of waves of immigration from eastern and southern Europe. In 1891, when Barberton was incorporated, the scattered farms that had originally characterized the landscape were transformed into a fledgling city of 1,800. When an Akron Beacon Journal reporter revisited Barberton in 1893, he noted that since 1891, it had grown so quickly that it appeared to have grown by magic (hence its nickname). Many new immigrants were attracted to its industrial jobs, which provided a path to assimilation.

In 1908, on a high hill on the east side of town, Barber began construction of an experimental farm and estate, which he called Anna–Dean Farm. It included his 52-room, French Renaissance Revival-style mansion, completed in 1909, and lush gardens, dozens of barns and other structures in the same style, and greenhouses. Barber built 35 structures for the Anna-Dean Farm, all in the French Renaissance Revival style. The farm covered 3500 acres. Believing farming could be as efficient as an industry, Barber intended the farm to be the basis of an agricultural college, but he did not complete its financing before his death. He willed the farm to Western Reserve University (now Case Western Reserve University). It later sold much of the property.

In May 1939, forty students were injured when a temporary school in the town exploded. News reports at the time indicated three children were not expected to survive. Firefighters suspected an accidental gas leak caused the blast.

Today, five of the eight primary buildings and associated property of the farm complex are owned by the Barberton Historical Society. These buildings are constructed of red brick edged in white concrete block, with royal blue trim and red tile roofing. The most significant of the remaining buildings is Barn No. 1, the former Dairy Barn, restored in 1985 and now the world headquarters of the Yoder Brothers Corporation, horticulturists. The building has castle tower-like silos, visible from much of the east side of the city. The other barns have been structurally stabilized and at least partially restored. All but one may be renovated for other economic uses. The Creamery has been restored as a residence for the same family since 1943 and served as the birthplace for the Apostolic Church of Barberton founded in 1950. After sale by Western Reserve University following World War 2, most of the 40-acre Barber estate was broken up and redeveloped for suburban residential housing. The mansion was demolished in 1965.

"The Magics" became the mascot name of the Barberton High School athletic teams. As Barberton High School colors are purple and white, "purple pride" marks local enthusiasm for the school. The city's schools have also improved academic performance since the 1980s.

During the 1980s Barberton suffered a precipitous economic decline due to restructuring in heavy industry and job losses, similar to much of the rest of the industrial American Midwest. It was in many ways representative of a typical Rust Belt city. During this period, the city lost a large part of its economic base as factories shuttered and stores went vacant. The Magic City: Unemployment in a Working-Class Community (Cornell University Press, 1989) documents the consequences of the migration of major industries from the region and the responses of residents to such dramatic changes. In 1985, key business stakeholders and government leaders created the Barberton Community Development Corporation (BCDC). The BCDC has facilitated the creation of over 2,000 jobs, and in excess of $100 million in business expansion projects. They have stimulated the creation of three mini-industrial parks and 25 new construction projects.

The Barberton Community Foundation facilitated the construction of a new Barberton High School, located on reclaimed swampland in the northwest section of the city.

== Geography ==
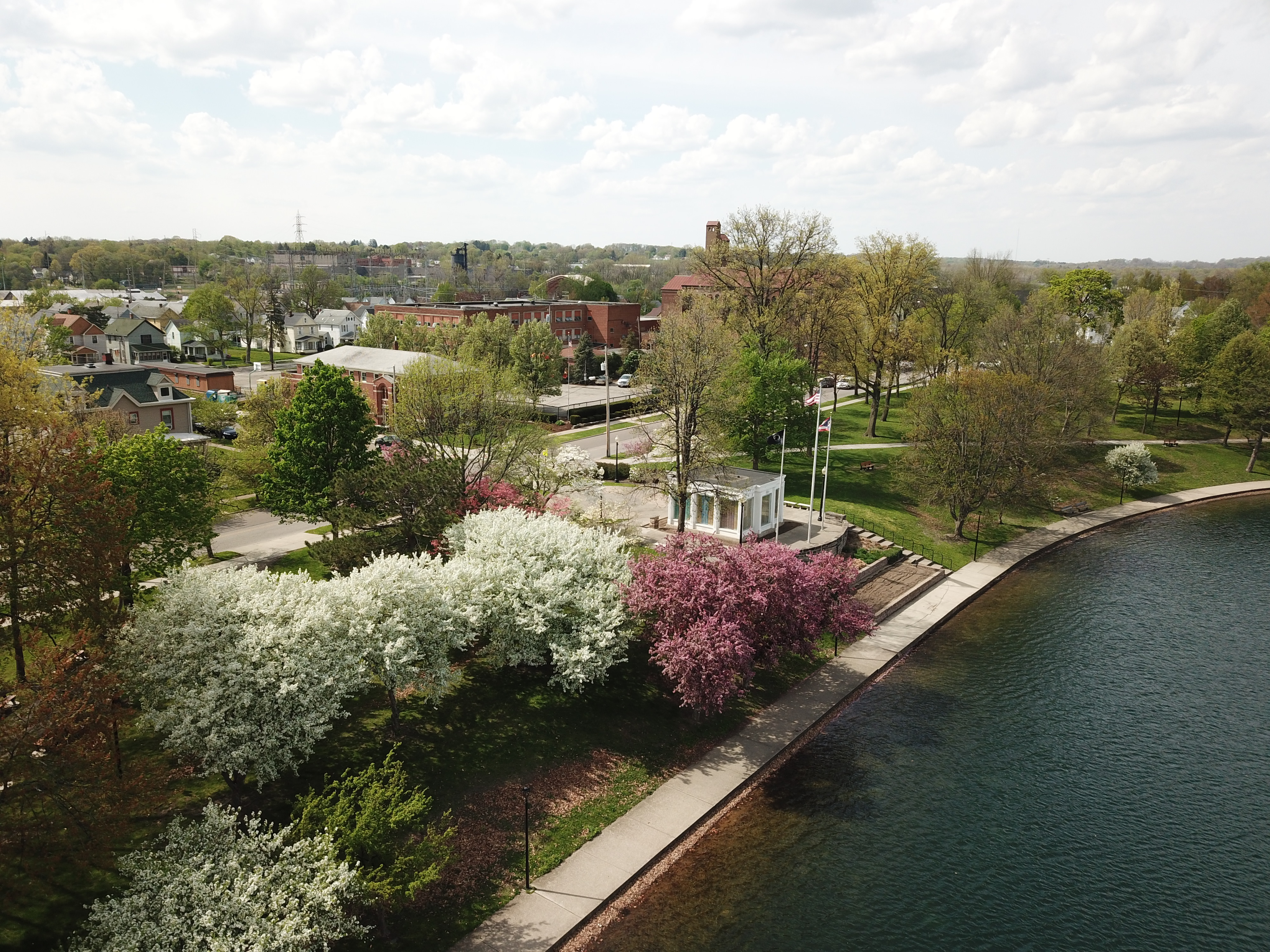
Barberton Veteran's Memorial at Lake Anna Park

According to the 2010 census, the city has a total area of 9.26 square miles (24.0 km^{2}), of which 9.04 square miles (23.4 km^{2}) (or 97.62%) is land and 0.22 square miles (0.57 km^{2}) (or 2.38%) is water.

Lake Anna, a glacial kettle lake, is a 10-acre (40,000 m^{2}) natural spring lake that lies in the center of the original village of Barberton. It is the center of a 21-acre (85,000 m^{2}) park named after it. Lake Anna is named for O. C. Barber's daughter Anna Laura Barber.

== Demographics ==
Historical population
Census	Pop.	Note	%±
1900	4,354		—
1910	9,410		116.1%
1920	18,811		99.9%
1930	23,934		27.2%
1940	24,028		0.4%
1950	27,820		15.8%
1960	33,805		21.5%
1970	33,052		−2.2%
1980	29,732		−10.0%
1990	27,623		−7.1%
2000	27,899		1.0%
2010	26,550		−4.8%
2020	25,191		−5.1%
2025 (est.)	24,748		−1.8%

=== 2020 census ===
As of the 2020 census, Barberton had a population of 25,191. The median age was 41.5 years. 21.0% of residents were under the age of 18 and 20.0% of residents were 65 years of age or older. For every 100 females there were 93.0 males, and for every 100 females age 18 and over there were 90.0 males age 18 and over.

99.2% of residents lived in urban areas, while 0.8% lived in rural areas.

There were 10,950 households in Barberton, of which 25.4% had children under the age of 18 living in them. Of all households, 35.7% were married-couple households, 21.6% were households with a male householder and no spouse or partner present, and 34.0% were households with a female householder and no spouse or partner present. About 35.2% of all households were made up of individuals and 15.9% had someone living alone who was 65 years of age or older.

There were 11,844 housing units, of which 7.5% were vacant. Among occupied housing units, 59.9% were owner-occupied and 40.1% were renter-occupied. The homeowner vacancy rate was 1.8% and the rental vacancy rate was 7.8%.

Racial composition as of the 2020 census
Race	Number	Percent
White	21,189	84.1%
Black or African American	2,019	8.0%
American Indian and Alaska Native	63	0.3%
Asian	132	0.5%
Native Hawaiian and Other Pacific Islander	14	0.1%
Some other race	208	0.8%
Two or more races	1,566	6.2%
Hispanic or Latino (of any race)	474	1.9%

=== 2010 census ===
At the 2010 census there were 26,550 people in 11,054 households, including 6,880 families, in the city. The population density was 2,936.9 inhabitants per square mile (1,133.9/km^{2}). There were 12,191 housing units at an average density of 1,348.6 per square mile (520.7/km^{2}). The racial makup of the city was 90.8% White, 5.9% African American, 0.3% Native American, 0.3% Asian, 0.4% from other races, and 2.2% from two or more races. Hispanic or Latino of any race were 1.4%.

There were 11,054 households, of which 30.1% had children under age 18 living with them, 39.9% were married couples living together, 16.3% had a female householder with no husband present, 6.0% had a male householder with no wife present, and 37.8% were non-families. 32.2% of households were one person and 13.8% were one person aged 65 or older. The average household size was 2.37 and the average family size was 2.97.

The median age was 39.8 years. 23.5% of residents were under the age of 18; 8.2% were between the ages of 18 and 24; 24.8% were from 25 to 44; 27.1% were from 45 to 64; and 16.5% were 65 or older. The gender makeup of the city was 47.9% male and 52.1% female.

=== 2000 census ===
At the 2000 census there were 27,899 people in 11,523 households, including 7,443 families, in the city. The population density was 3,095.2 inhabitants per square mile (1,195.1/km^{2}). There were 12,163 housing units at an average density of 1,349.4 per square mile (521.0/km^{2}). The racial makup of the city was 92.43% White, 5.33% African American, 0.27% Native American, 0.37% Asian, 0.01% Pacific Islander, 0.24% from other races, and 1.36% from two or more races. Hispanic or Latino of any race were 0.64%.

There were 11,523 households, of which 29.5% had children under age 18 living with them, 44.9% were married couples living together, 15.4% had a female householder with no husband present, and 35.4% were non-families. 30.1% of households were one person and 14.0% were one person aged 65 or older. The average household size was 2.39 and the average family size was 2.96.

The age distribution was 24.8% under the age of 18, 8.4% from 18 to 24, 28.3% from 25 to 44, 21.2% from 45 to 64, and 17.3% 65 or older. The median age was 37 years. For every 100 females, there were 87.5 males. For every 100 females age 18 and over, there were 82.8 males.

The median household income was $32,178 and the median family income was $39,387. Males had a median income of $32,294 versus $21,778 for females. The per capita income for the city was $17,764. About 11.5% of families and 13.3% of the population were below the poverty line, including 21.3% of those under age 18 and 7.5% of those age 65 or over.

== Culture ==
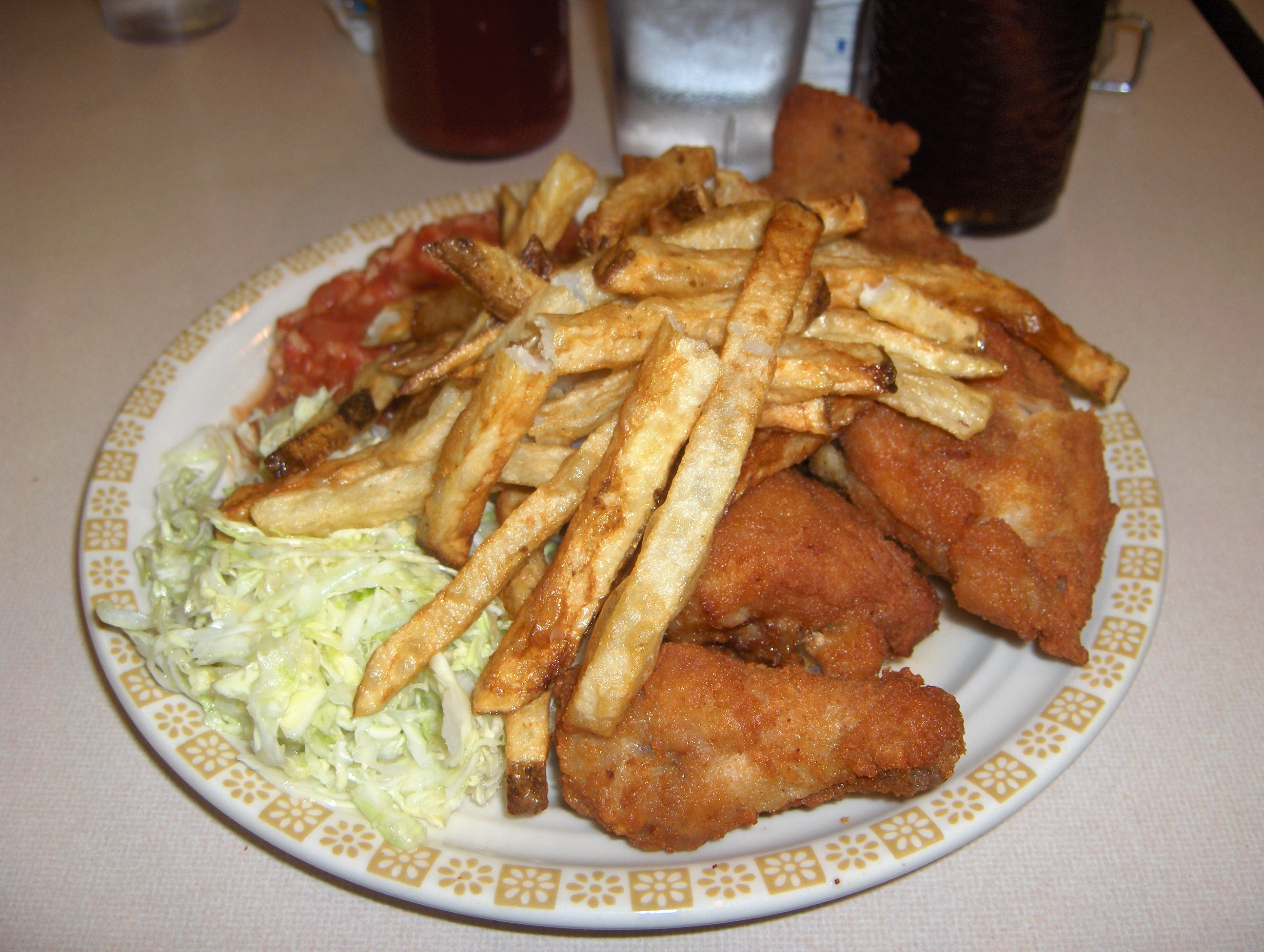
A traditional Barberton chicken dinner

Barberton is known for Barberton chicken, a local style of fried chicken. It is a Serbian-American dish served in several mainly Serbian-owned restaurants in the area. The style of chicken has given the town national recognition, with some proclaiming Barberton to be the "Chicken Capital of the World" or the "Fried Chicken Capital of America."

== Education ==
Children in Barberton are served by the public Barberton City School District. The current schools serving the city are:

- Barberton Primary School – grades K–2
- Barberton Intermediate School – grades 3–5
- Barberton Middle School – grades 6–8
- Barberton High School – grades 9–12

== Media ==
Barberton's sources of news include daily newspapers from nearby major cities, such as the Akron-based Akron Beacon Journal and the Cleveland-based The Plain Dealer, along with a weekly newspaper called the Barberton Gazette, which began on August 24, 2023. Previously, the city was served by the Barberton Herald, a weekly newspaper that ceased publication on December 29, 2022.

== Transportation ==
Barberton station was a train station along the Erie Railroad main line. It opened in 1890 as a station of the New York, Pennsylvania and Ohio Railroad. Passenger service was terminated on August 1, 1965, with the cancellation of the Atlantic Express (eastbound) Pacific Express (westbound), and multi-day trains from Hoboken, New Jersey to Dearborn Station in Chicago.

== Notable people ==
- John Cominsky, professional football player in the National Football League (NFL)
- Glenn Davis, Olympic runner and gold medalist; professional football player in the NFL
- Derrick Dukes, professional wrestler in the American Wrestling Association
- David M. Kelley, co-founder of design firm IDEO
- Scot Loeffler, college football head coach
- John Mackovic, head football coach in the NFL and college football
- Josh McDaniels, football coach in the NFL
- George Morgan, country music singer
- Hal Naragon, professional baseball player in Major League Baseball
- Alvin Robertson, professional basketball player in the National Basketball Association (NBA)
- Bo Schembechler, college football head coach
- Lynn St. John, athletic director for The Ohio State University
- Betty Sutton, politician in the Democratic Party
- Jeff Tabaka, professional baseball player in Major League Baseball
- Lynne M. Tracy, United States Ambassador to Russia
- Joe Williams, professional football player in the NFL
- Howard E. Woodford, Medal of Honor recipient
