= O. C. Barber =

American businessman (1841–1920)

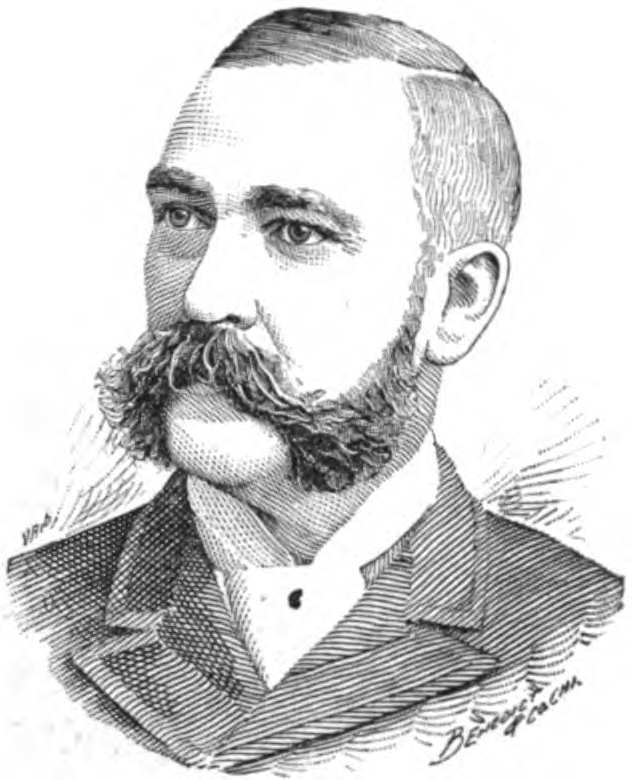

Ohio Columbus Barber (April 20, 1841 – February 4, 1920) was an American businessman, industrialist and philanthropist. He was called "America's Match King" because of his controlling interest in the Diamond Match Company, which had 85 percent of the market in 1881. At his peak, his companies had a labor force of thousands while his products were used by most people in the United States and a sizable fraction of the world's population on a daily basis.

Barber founded the city of Barberton, Ohio, in 1891 and moved his manufacturing plant there in 1894. It produced 250 million matches per day. He also founded the Akron City Hospital.

== Biography ==
Ohio Columbus Barber (called O.C.) was born the second son of George and Eliza Barber in Middlebury, a small Ohio village later annexed by Akron. His father used to be a barrel maker from Connecticut but started producing matching when the family relocated to Akron. He made matches by hand, which his sons sold door to door.

O.C. first received a common school education, and at age 15 began working for his father. At age 16, O.C. Barber became the company salesman. At 20, he was a partner in the business, and by 21 the general manager.

The company had difficulties through the American Civil War, and O.C.'s older brother, George H. Barber, who was a soldier, died of dysentery, one of the many war casualties of disease. By 1880 the Barber Company had become the biggest match-producing company in Ohio and one of the largest in the nation. Unregulated competition made it difficult for the Barber Company to keep stable. In 1881, the Barber Company and 11 other match-producing companies merged into the Diamond Match Company, which dominated the match market, holding 85 percent of the U.S. Market.

Barber was long a leader in his own home town, Akron. He was, for many years, president of the First National Bank of Akron, and when it was consolidated with the Second National Bank under the name of the First-Second National Bank he was unanimously elected to the presidency of the combined institutions.

To expand manufacturing operations, Barber purchased a large area from Norton Township founding the city of Barberton in 1891. He intended it to be a model for industrial and residential development. Barber developed its early stages through The Barberton Land and Improvement Company. Within a few years, the city had expanded with industrial and residential areas, growing at such a rate it was nicknamed "Magic City". It attracted many new immigrants to its industrial jobs.

In 1894 due to a tax dispute in Akron, Barber moved his match-making plant to Barberton, which helped the city's economy. The factory produced 250 million matches each day. He also raised 75,000 Peking ducks on the Barberton Reservoir.

In 1889, Barber founded and organized the American Straw Board Company. He was one of the early manufacturers of rubber products, and organized and managed the Diamond Rubber Company, which he acquired from the Sherbondy brothers. He ran the company, which focused on bicycle and automobile tires, up to the time of its acquisition by the B. F. Goodrich Company in 1912. Diamond Match Company was also reorganized on February 13, 1889.

The sewer-pipe and steel-tube industry next engaged his attention, and he became a western pioneer in this line of endeavor. He founded the Stirling Boiler Company which was merged with the Babcock & Wilcox Boiler Manufacturing Company of Barberton and Bayonne, New Jersey, the concern thus becoming the largest manufacturer of steel boilers in the world. For a number of years, they constructed four-fifths of the product used by the United States Navy.

One of the biggest achievements of Barber's career, particularly from the humanitarian and economical standpoints, was the establishment, with Frederick Grinnell and others, of the General Fire Extinguisher Company. Barber was the founder and sole owner of the O. C. Barber Concrete Company, whose plant at Barberton was said to be the largest of its kind in the world. It also made art works in concrete. He originated the O. C. Barber Fertilizer Company, of Barber, Virginia. He also undertook the development of large tracts of land in and about the city of Canton, Ohio, in connection with which he has organized and operated a large plant under the name of the O. C. Barber Allied Industries Company. Some of these lands contain valuable coal, lime, and clay properties.

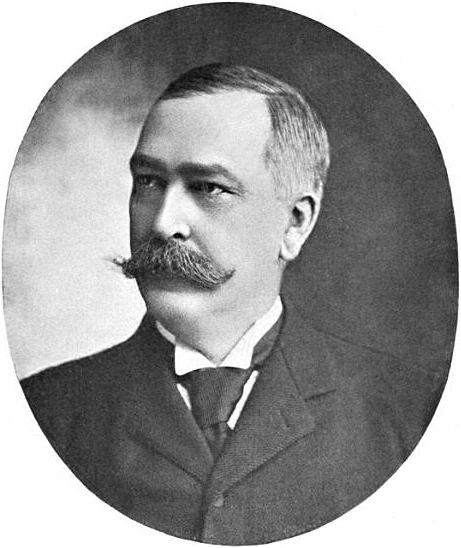
O.C. Barber circa 1901

He was the originator and guiding spirit of Barber Subways, at Cleveland. His plans called for the building of an underground system of subways connecting every railroad entering Cleveland, at the Lake Front, thus facilitating the handling of freight, and the establishment of the great warehouse system on the Lake Shore, where he owned large frontages.

In 1905, he began his last project, to create a scientific farm. He gradually purchased more than 3,000 acres (12 km^{2}). In 1909, Barber used his wealth to commission construction of a three-story, 52-room mansion in Barberton; it was completed in 18 months. Over 300 feet (91 m) long, the mansion was designed in the French Renaissance Revival style by the Akron architects Harpster & Bliss. It cost more than $400,000 to construct and had an area of 25,000 square feet (2,300 m^{2}). Among its amenities was an elevator with a glass skylight. On the grounds were gardens and a 40-acre (160,000 m^{2}) park, designed by a Chicago landscape architect firm. The extravagant building was reported by local and national papers; the New York Times called it the "finest mansion between New York and Chicago." Barber and his family moved into the mansion in October 1910. It stood until 1965, when it was demolished.

In addition, Barber had 35 structures built as part of his experimental, scientific Anna Dean Farm, which covered 3,500 acres (14 km^{2}). He named it after his daughter Anna and her husband, Dr. Arthur Dean Bevan. These were also in the French Renaissance Revival style, as he believed farm buildings should be both beautiful and functional. He intended to have a farm that operated as efficiently as industry. For education, he opened the grounds to the public weekly on Sundays. Many of his facilities were the largest in the world at the time, such as the greenhouses, covering 12 acres (49,000 m^{2}) and heated by the Heating House; Barn #3, 751 feet (229 m) long, 40 feet (12 m) wide and three stories high, the largest barn in the world when constructed in 1912, and the Brooder Barn's incubator. He raised 50,000 chickens, which were allowed "free range". Barber had a barn for 140 thoroughbred Belgian draft horses, used for show and for farm work.

In 1920, Barber died at his mansion in Barberton. He willed his farm to Case Western University, intending it to serve as the basis of an agricultural college, but he failed to complete the financing before his death. Since neither his widow nor the university was able to operate the farm, the university sold most of the property with the mansion being purchased by Arthur O. Austin. It was divided and redeveloped.

== Family ==
After the American Civil War, when Barber was 26, he married Laura Brown of Coventry, Ohio. They had one daughter Anna, the namesake years later for a lake and park in Barberton, and a son Charles, who died young. Anna Dean Farm was named after their daughter and her husband, Dr. Arthur Dean Bevan. Laura died in 1894. After being a widower for 20 years, in 1915 Barber married Mary Orr, who had worked as his secretary and shared his vision.

== Legacy and honors ==
- Eight of the farm buildings of Anna Dean Farm survive. Six are owned and maintained by the Barberton Historical Society, which is stabilizing them. The eight surviving buildings are Barn No. 1, the Colt Barn, the Creamery, the Piggery, the Brooder Barn, the Poultry Manager's Office, the Feed Barn, and the Heating House, gradually being renovated and restored for other uses. Two are now used as private residences. The most significant, the former dairy barn, Barn No. 1, was restored in 1985 by the Yoder Brothers, horticulturalists who use it for their world headquarters. Its silos resemble castle towers and are visible from across the city. They are constructed of red brick edged in white concrete block, with royal blue trim and red tile roofing. The other barns have been structurally stabilized and at least partially restored. All but one may be renovated for other economic uses.
- Barberton, Ohio
- The Barberton Erie Depot
- Barber near Chico, California was named after him. He had the neighborhood built as workers' housing for the employees of the Diamond Match factory in Chico. At its peak, Barber also had orchards, shops, a swimming pool, social hall, and neighborhoods of bungalow houses. Barber faced stiff competition by local manufacturers, and in 1908 he consolidated his operations in Ohio. The village of Barber was eventually absorbed into the town of Chico, California.
- He founded Akron City Hospital in 1904 and in 1906 the Akron Chamber of Commerce.
