= List of OHSAA softball champions =

The Ohio High School Athletic Association (OHSAA) is the governing body of athletic programs for junior and senior high schools in the state of Ohio. It conducts state championship competitions in all the OHSAA-sanctioned sports.

== Champions ==
Year	DI	DII	DIII	DIV	DV	DVI	DVII
1978	Lakemore Springfield	Champion	Casstown Miami East				
1979	Akron St Vincent-St Mary	Manchester	Jeromesville Hillsdale				
1980	Cuyahoga Falls	Champion	Portsmouth Clay				
1981	Tallmadge	Kinsman Badger	Portsmouth Clay				
1982	Kettering Fairmont East	Kinsman Badger	Archbold				
1983	Grove City	Akron Archbishop Hoban	Portsmouth Clay				
1984	Akron St Vincent-St Mary	Akron Archbishop Hoban	Archbold				
1985	Hamilton	Zanesville Maysville	Mineral Ridge				
1986	Brunswick	Akron Archbishop Hoban	Archbold				
1987	Tallmadge	Akron Archbishop Hoban	Strasburg-Franklin				
1988	Lakemore Springfield	Tallmadge	Strasburg-Franklin				
1989	Lakemore Springfield	Tallmadge	Strasburg-Franklin				
1990	Lakemore Springfield	Bucyrus	Manchester				
1991	Perrysburg	Akron Archbishop Hoban	Strasburg-Franklin				
1992	Lakemore Springfield	Akron Archbishop Hoban	North Lewisburg Triad				
1993	Lakemore Springfield	Tallmadge	Loudonville				
1994	Lakemore Springfield	Champion	Jeromesville Hillsdale				
1995	Lakemore Springfield	Columbus Bishop Ready	North Robinson Colonel Crawford				
1996	Akron Ellet	Lexington Township Marlington	Jeromesville Hillsdale				
1997	Pickerington Central	Tallmadge	Loudonville				
1998	North Canton Hoover	Tallmadge	Southington Chalker				
1999	North Canton Hoover	La Grange Keystone	Jeromesville Hillsdale				
2000	Hilliard Darby	Conneaut	Jeromesville Hillsdale				
2001	Boardman	Lima Bath	Manchester	Gibsonburg			
2002	Elyria	Cuyahoga Falls Walsh Jesuit	Loudonville	Gibsonburg			
2003	Whitehouse Anthony Wayne	Mantua Crestwood	Sycamore Mohawk	Gibsonburg			
2004	Toledo St Ursula Academy	Cuyahoga Falls Walsh Jesuit	Woodsfield Monroe Central	Crestline			
2005	Uniontown Lake	Lakemore Springfield	Sycamore Mohawk	Convoy Crestview			
2006	North Canton Hoover	La Grange Keystone	Bloom-Carroll	Dalton			
2007	Hudson	Greenville	Bloom-Carroll	Dalton			
2008	North Canton Hoover	Canfield	Hebron Lakewood	Danville			
2009	Elyria	Hamilton Ross	Hebron Lakewood	Strasburg-Franklin			
2010	Massillon Perry	Hebron Lakewood	Jeromesville Hillsdale	Pleasant Hill Newton			
2011	North Canton Hoover	Poland Seminary	Champion	Strasburg-Franklin			
2012	North Canton Hoover	La Grange Keystone	Champion	Convoy Crestview			
2013	North Canton Hoover	Newark Licking Valley	Bloom-Carroll	Strasburg-Franklin			
2014	North Canton Hoover	Lima Bath	Williamsport Westfall	Cuyahoga Heights			
2015	Ashville Teays Valley	Granville	Champion	Shadyside			
2016	Cuyahoga Falls Walsh Jesuit	Hebron Lakewood	Wheelersburg	Convoy Crestview			
2017	Elyria	Hebron Lakewood	Champion	Williamsburg			
2018	Massillon Perry	La Grange Keystone	Champion	Jeromesville Hillsdale			
2019	Louisville	Plain City Jonathan Alder	Champion	Antwerp			
2020	Tournament canceled	Tournament canceled	Tournament canceled	Tournament canceled			
2021	Massillon Perry	La Grange Keystone	Sherwood Fairview	Bradford			
2022	Lakota West	Wooster Triway	Wheelersburg	Strasburg-Franklin			
2023	Austintown Fitch	Tallmadge	Wheelersburg	Strasburg-Franklin			
2024	Austintown Fitch	Canfield	Baltimore Liberty Union	Strasburg-Franklin			
2025	Lebanon	Painesville Riverside	Dover	Kenton Ridge	Wheelersburg	New Madison Tri-Village	Portsmouth Notre Dame
2026	Hilliard Bradley	Kings Mills Kings	Caroll Bloom-Carroll	Kenton Ridge	Wheelersburg	Danville	Portsmouth Notre Dame

== See also ==
- List of Ohio High School Athletic Association championships
- List of high schools in Ohio
- Ohio High School Athletic Conferences
- Ohio High School Athletic Association
