= Northampton Township =

Northampton Township may refer to:

- Northampton Township, Summit County, Ohio
- Northampton Township, Bucks County, Pennsylvania
- Northampton Township, Somerset County, Pennsylvania
