= Ryan Bee =

American football player (born 1995)

No. 92
- Position: Defensive end

Personal information
- Born: November 12, 1995 (age 30); Ashland, Ohio, U.S.
- Listed height: 6 ft 7 in (2.01 m)
- Listed weight: 280 lb (127 kg)

Career information
- High school: Hillsdale (Jeromesville, Ohio)
- College: Marshall (2014–2018)
- NFL draft: 2019: undrafted

Career history
- Washington Redskins (2019–2020); Arizona Cardinals (2021)*
- * Offseason or practice squad member only

Awards and highlights
- 2× Second-team All-CUSA (2017–2018)

Career NFL statistics
- Tackles: 1
- Stats at Pro Football Reference

Ryan Bee (born November 12, 1995) is an American former professional football player who was a defensive end for the Washington Redskins of the National Football League (NFL). He played college football for the Marshall Thundering Herd. He was also a member of the Arizona Cardinals.

== Early life ==
Bee played high school football at Hillsdale High School in Jeromesville, Ohio. He recorded 66 tackles, 11 sacks, and three forced fumbles his junior year in 2012, earning third-team All-Ohio Divisions V-VI honors. He totaled 88 tackles and 15 sacks while also catching 20 passes for 250 yards and eight touchdowns as a senior in 2013, garnering Associated Press first-team All-Ohio Division VI recognition. Bee was a captain in both football in basketball.

== College career ==
Bee played college football for the Marshall Thundering Herd from 2015 to 2018. He was redshirted in 2014 and was a member of the scout team.

He played in 12 games, starting eight, in 2015, accumulating 59 tackles, four sacks, three fumble recoveries, two pass breakups, and one blocked kick, earning Conference USA All-Freshman honors. Bee appeared in 11 games, starting 10, during the 2016 season, recording 54 tackles, 4.5 sacks, one forced fumble, and two pass breakups. He started all 13 games for the Thundering Herd in 2017, totaling 51 tackles, 5.5 sacks, one pass breakup, and one blocked kick, garnering second-team All-Conference USA accolades. His sack total also led the team that year. Bee recorded 36 tackles and 4.5 sacks in 2018, earning second-team All-Conference USA honors for the second consecutive season.

== Professional career ==
=== Washington Redskins ===
After going undrafted in the 2019 NFL draft, Bee signed with the Washington Redskins on April 30, 2019. He was waived on August 31 and signed to the team's practice squad the next day. He was promoted to the active roster on November 22. Bee made his NFL debut on November 24 against the Detroit Lions, playing three snaps on defense and one snap on special teams while recording one assisted tackle. He was waived on November 26 and re-signed to the practice squad on November 28. He signed a futures contract with the Redskins on December 30, 2019.

Bee was placed on injured reserve on September 5, 2020. He was waived from injured reserve on September 16, 2020.

=== Arizona Cardinals ===
Bee was signed by the Arizona Cardinals on April 15, 2021. He was waived on July 27, 2021.
