= Tallmadge City School District =

School district in Ohio, United States

Address
- 486 East Avenue Tallmadge, Ohio, 44278; United States
- Coordinates: 41°05′59″N 81°25′21″W

District information
- Type: Public
- Grades: K through 12
- Superintendent: Steve Wood
- NCES District ID: 3904488

Students and staff
- Students: 2,507 (2024–25)
- Teachers: 134.36
- Staff: 254.49

Other information
- Website: tallmadgeschools.org

The Tallmadge City School District is a public school district based in Tallmadge, Ohio, United States. It serves approximagely 2,500 students living in Tallmadge and a small portion of neighboring Munroe Falls. The district operates three school buildings for grades K through 12, while Summit Educational Service Center opearates a preschool for Tallmadge residents at the former David Bacon School.

== Schools ==
- Tallmadge High School (grades 9–12)
- Tallmadge Middle School (grades 6–8)
- Tallmadge Elementary School (grades K–5)
- Tallmadge Preschool, operated by Summit Educational Service Center at David Bacon School in cooperation with the district.

== Former schools ==
- David Bacon School, used as a neighborhood elementary school. Closed in 1985, now houses the Tallmadge Preschool operated by Summit Educational Service Center, Head Start operated by Community Action Akron Summit, and the Early Childhood Professions program from Tallmadge High School as part of the Six District Compact
- Dunbar School, used as a neighborhood elementary school and later as the district's K–2 building. Closed in 2020 and razed
- Munroe School, used as a neighborhood elementary school and later as the district's 3–5 school. Closed in 2020 and razed
- Overdale School, used as a neighborhood elementary school until 1987, then leased to Akron Children's Hospital from 1987 to 1995. Reopened in 1995 as a primary school for grades K–1 until 2011. Sold to Cornerstone Community School in 2012
- Tallmadge High School/Tallmadge Middle School; opened in 1960, served as Tallmadge High School until 2008 and as Tallmadge Middle School until 2019. Razed in 2019.
- Central School, built in 1911. Housed all grades until 1923 when a separate high school was built adjacent to Central. Used for elementary grades until 1950 and then as the junior high school until 2008. Later additions were torn down in 2010 and the original 1911 building was razed in 2019.
