= Tom Crabtree =

American football player (born 1985)

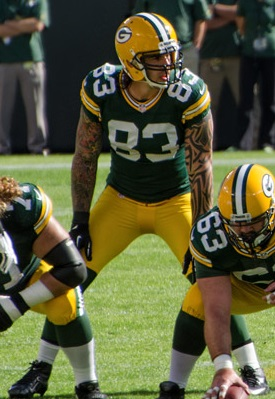
- Crabtree with the Packers in 2012

No. 83, 84
- Position: Tight end

Personal information
- Born: November 4, 1985 (age 41); Columbus, Ohio, U.S.
- Listed height: 6 ft 4 in (1.93 m)
- Listed weight: 245 lb (111 kg)

Career information
- High school: Bloom-Carroll (Carroll, Ohio)
- College: Miami (OH)
- NFL draft: 2009: undrafted

Career history
- Kansas City Chiefs (2009)*; Green Bay Packers (2009–2012); Tampa Bay Buccaneers (2013); New Orleans Saints (2014)
- * Offseason or practice squad member only

Awards and highlights
- Super Bowl champion (XLV)

Career NFL statistics
- Receptions: 22
- Receiving yards: 323
- Receiving touchdowns: 5
- Stats at Pro Football Reference

Thomas Louis Crabtree (born November 4, 1985) is an American former professional football player who was a tight end in the National Football League (NFL). He played college football for the Miami RedHawks. Crabtree spent most of his NFL career with the Green Bay Packers, with whom he won Super Bowl XLV over the Pittsburgh Steelers.

== Early life ==
Crabtree played high school football for Bloom-Carroll High School in Carroll, Ohio. He attended Miami University in Oxford, Ohio, where he played tight end for the RedHawks for four seasons from 2005 to 2008. Primarily known as an excellent blocker, during his career at Miami he caught 40 passes for 329 yards (an 8.1 average) with two touchdowns.

He graduated from Miami with a degree in secondary education.

== Professional career ==
=== Kansas City Chiefs ===
Crabtree was signed by the Kansas City Chiefs as an undrafted free agent on May 8, 2009. He appeared in all four of Kansas City's preseason games, with two catches for 19 yards. He was then waived in the Chiefs' final roster cutdown on September 6, but he was signed to the Chiefs’ practice squad the next day after clearing waivers. He was released after the third regular-season game.

=== Green Bay Packers ===
During the 2009 NFL season, Crabtree was signed to the Green Bay Packers practice squad for the final five weeks of the 2009 NFL season and then to a reserve/futures contract after the season ended. He made it past the Packers' final roster cutdown before the 2010 NFL season as their fourth-string tight end behind Jermichael Finley, Donald Lee and rookie Andrew Quarless.

In the 2010 regular season for the Packers, he totaled four catches for 61 yards. In 2011, he had six catches for 38 yards and one touchdown.

Crabtree played in all 16 games on offense and special teams. He caught a seven-yard touchdown pass from Aaron Rodgers in the first quarter of the Packers' wild card game at the Philadelphia Eagles, opening the scoring with his first NFL touchdown.

He won a Super Bowl ring with the Packers on February 6, 2011, at Cowboys Stadium in Super Bowl XLV, won by the Packers 31–25. In the game, he had one catch (from Aaron Rodgers) for one yard and he also made one tackle.

In 2012 against the Chicago Bears, Crabtree caught a touchdown pass from holder Tim Masthay on a fake field goal, as the Packers went on to win 23–10. Against the Houston Texans, he caught a 48-yard touchdown pass. Against the Cardinals, he caught a career-long 72-yard touchdown pass.

=== Tampa Bay Buccaneers ===
Crabtree signed a two-year contract with the Tampa Bay Buccaneers on March 15, 2013.

He started the season on injured reserve with a high ankle sprain suffered in a preseason game. The injury plagued him much of the season. Once activated, he caught four passes for 21 yards with one touchdown. He was again placed on injured reserve November 25, ending his season after suffering a torn bicep, for which he underwent surgery.

His lone touchdown of the 2013 season came on a 2-yard jump pass from running back Mike James.

On May 17, 2014, Crabtree announced via Twitter that he had been released from the Buccaneers.

=== New Orleans Saints ===
Crabtree signed with New Orleans Saints on October 7, 2014, after tight end try outs were conducted on the same day, with Crabtree getting the nod from the team. He was released on October 18, 2014, but was re-signed to the active roster two days later on October 20. He was eventually released again on October 24. Although he was released from the active roster prior to game days, Crabtree still collected his weekly paycheck for participating in the practices of the several weeks he was with the Saints.

=== Retirement ===
On April 30, 2015, Crabtree announced his retirement from football.

== Personal life ==
He married Chelsea Crabtree on June 28, 2009. They have a son, Bryce, born October 14, 2010, and a daughter, Delaynie May, born April 29, 2012. He and his wife are active in raising funds and awareness for juvenile diabetes and for the Juvenile Diabetes Research Foundation. Tom is a massive Ohio State fan, having been born in Columbus.

In 2016, he appeared in a short promotional video produced by eighth-graders of Bloom-Carroll Middle School (his junior-high alma mater) to help boost yearbook sales.

On November 30, 2016, he became a recurring guest on the podcast Pardon My Take, hosted by Dan "Big Cat" Katz and PFT Commenter.

== NFL statistics ==
=== Regular season ===
Offense

Year	Receiving
Year	Team	G	Rec	Yds	TD	Avg
2010	GB	16	4	61	0	15.3
2011	GB	16	6	38	1	6.3
2012	GB	14	8	203	3	25.4
2013	TB	7	4	21	1	5.3
Total		53	22	323	5	14.7

Defense

Year	Tackles
Year	Team	G	Tot	Tkl	Ast
2010	GB	16	10	8	2
2011	GB	16	6	5	1
2012	GB	2	6	5	1
Total		32	16	13	3

=== Playoff statistics ===
Offense

Year	Receiving
Year	Team	G	Rec	Yds	TD	Avg
2010	GB	4	2	8	1	4.0
Total		4	2	8	1	4.0
