= Hillsdale Local School District =

School district in Ohio

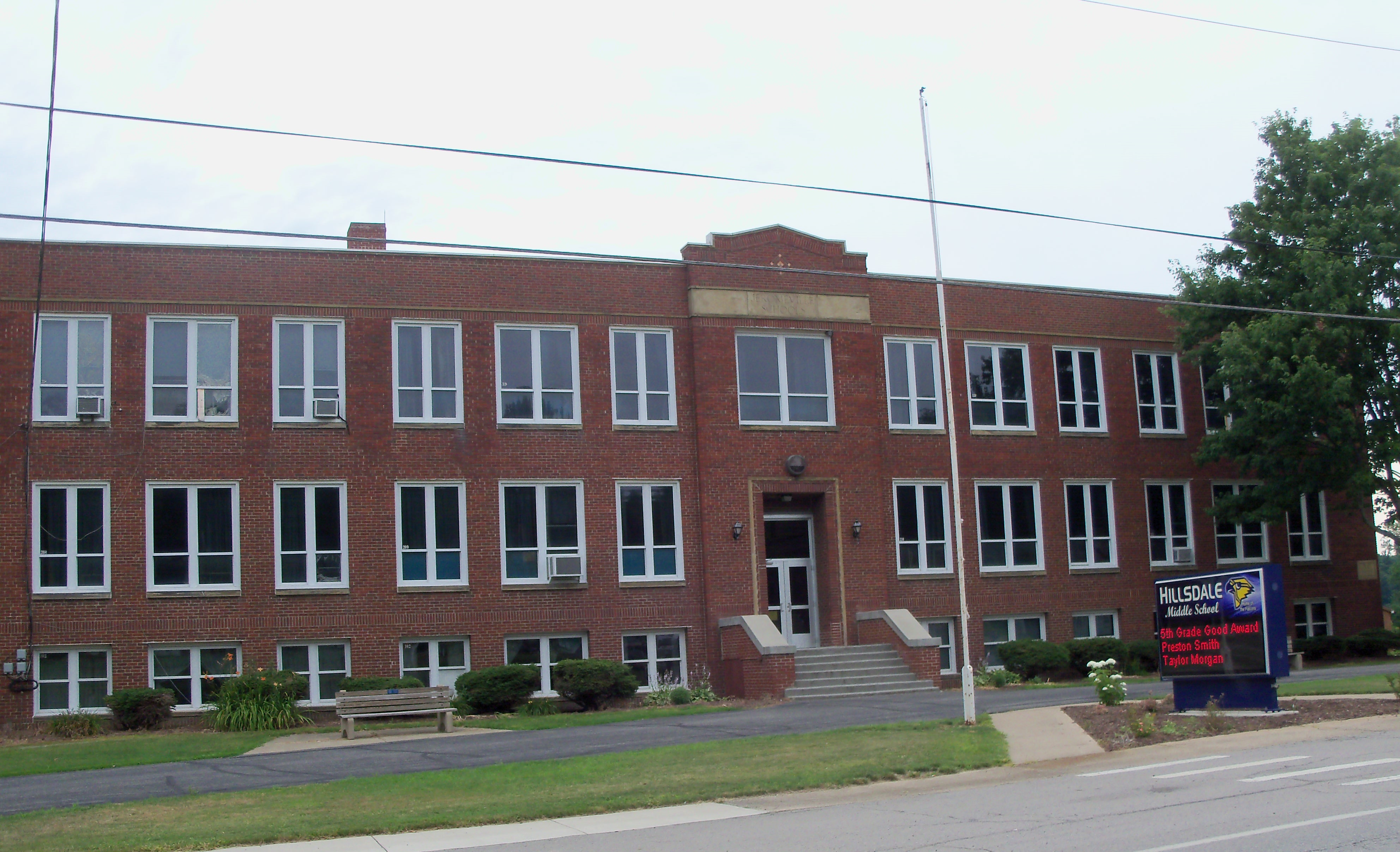
- Hillsdale Middle School

Address
- 485 Township Road 1902 Jeromesville, Ashland County, Ohio, 44840; United States

District information
- Grades: K - 12
- Superintendent: Steve Dickerson
- NCES District ID: 3904582

Students and staff
- Enrollment: 1,175
- Student–teacher ratio: 15.91

Other information
- Telephone: (419) 368-8231
- Fax: (419) 368-7504
- Website: www.hillsdale.k12.oh.us

The Hillsdale Local School District is a public school district in Ashland County, Ohio, United States, based in Jeromesville, Ohio.

== Schools ==
The Hillsdale Local School District has one elementary school, one middle school, and one high school. Construction of a new combined campus began on September 30, 2020 and the new facility is scheduled to open at the start of the 2022/2023 school year.

=== Elementary school ===
- Hillsdale Elementary School

=== Middle school ===
- Hillsdale Middle School

=== High school ===
- Hillsdale High School
