= Portage Township, Summit County, Ohio =

Former township in Summit County, Ohio

Portage Township
- Former township
- Location within the state of Ohio
- Coordinates: 41°5′58″N 81°32′23″W
- Country: United States
- State: Ohio
- County: Summit
- Time zone: UTC-5 (Eastern (EST))
  - Summer (DST): UTC-4 (EDT)

Portage Township was one of the sixteen original townships established in what is now Summit County, Ohio. The township occupied a central portion of the county and historically encompassed the areas that later developed into the cities of Akron and Cuyahoga Falls, as well as the early settlement of Middlebury. Over the late 19th and early 20th centuries, the territory of Portage Township was gradually annexed by the expanding municipalities of Akron and Cuyahoga Falls, and the township ultimately ceased to exist as a separate civil jurisdiction.

The township was named for the Portage Path, a historic north–south trail that passed through the region.

== Geography ==
Portage Township occupied land situated between the original townships of Copley to the west, Northampton to the north, Tallmadge to the east, and Coventry to the south. During the early 19th century, several settlements developed within Portage Township, including Middlebury (established circa 1810–1812), Akron (founded in 1825 with the construction of the Ohio & Erie Canal), and Cuyahoga Falls (platted between 1812 and 1815).

== History ==
Permanent Euro‑American settlement in the area began in 1810, when Major Miner Spicer established a homestead in the locality later known as Spicertown. The township was formally organized in 1838 at a meeting held in the home of Warren H. Clark. The first elected officers included trustees William B. Mitchell, Simon Perkins, Jr., and George Babcock, with Horace K. Smith serving as clerk and Samuel A. Wheeler as treasurer.

During its early development, much of the land within Portage Township was owned by Simon Perkins, a prominent figure in the region’s settlement. Portions of the township contained uneven or varied terrain, which limited agricultural use in some areas.

As Akron and Cuyahoga Falls expanded, both municipalities annexed portions of Portage Township. Over time, these annexations absorbed the township’s territory, and Portage Township ceased functioning as a distinct governmental unit.

== Counties ==
The land that later formed Portage Township was included in several counties as Ohio’s administrative boundaries evolved:

Year	County
1788	Washington
1797	Jefferson
1800	Trumbull
1808	Portage
1840	Summit
