= EKHS =

EKHS may refer to:

- East Kentwood High School, Kentwood, Michigan, United States
- East Knox High School, Howard, Ohio, United States
