= Cardington-Lincoln High School =

High school in Cardington, Ohio, United States

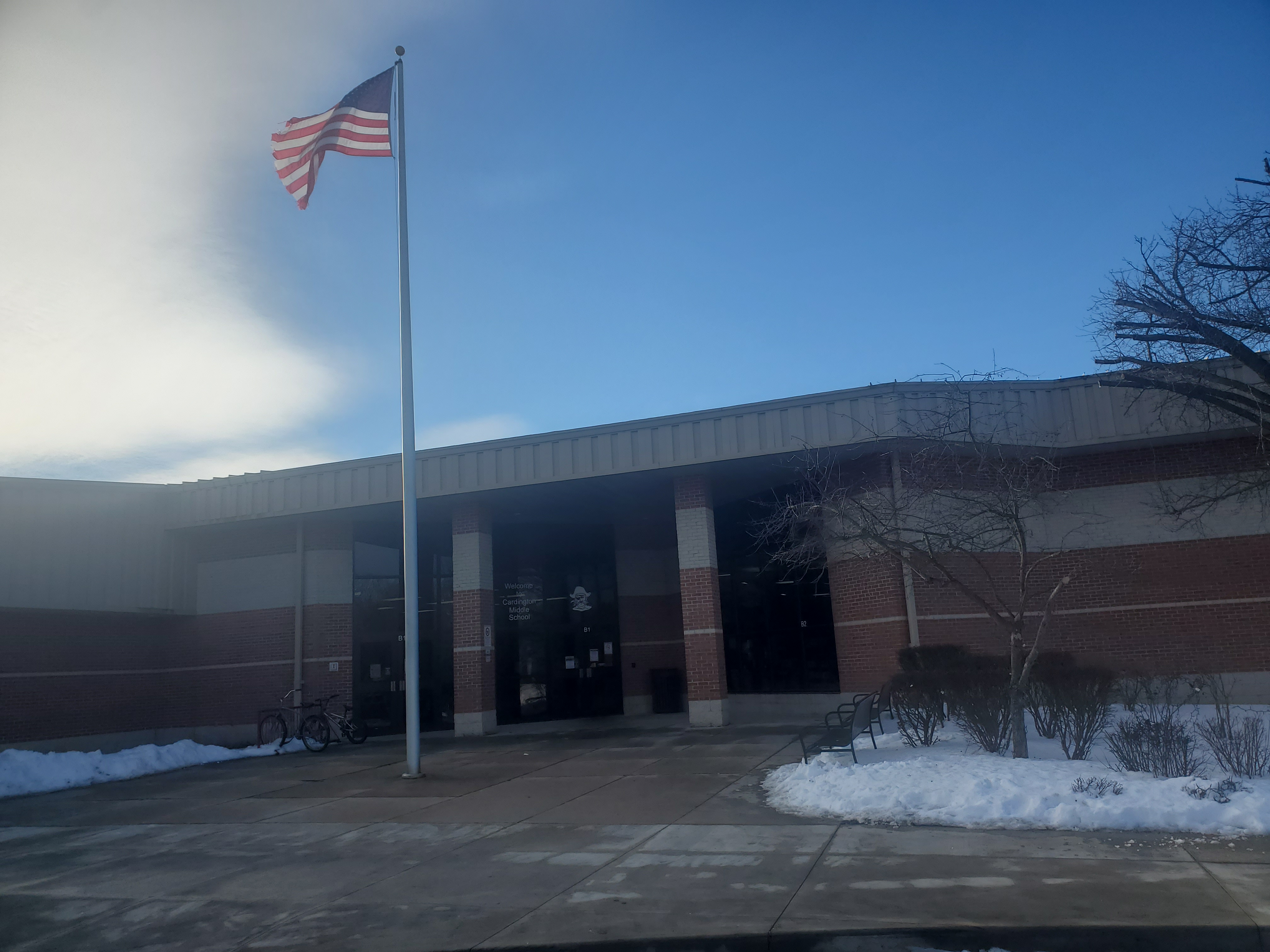
- Photo of the school in 2022

Location
- 349 Chesterville Avenue; Cardington, (Morrow County), Ohio 43315; United States
- Coordinates: 40.495281°N 82.881785°W

Information
- School type: Public school (government funded), high school
- Founded: 1868
- Status: Active
- School district: Cardington-Lincoln Local Schools
- NCES District ID: 3904879
- Superintendent: Todd Spinner
- CEEB code: 360800
- NCES School ID: 390487903405
- Principal: Ron Williams
- Teaching staff: 17.00 (on an FTE basis)
- Grades: 9–12
- Enrollment: 245 (2024-2025)
- Student to teacher ratio: 14.41
- Campus: Rural
- Colors: Red, white, black
- Slogan: "Leading all Students to College, Career and Civic Readiness"
- Fight song: Pirate Battle Cry
- Athletics conference: Knox Morrow Athletic Conference (KMAC)
- Mascot: Pirates
- Rival: Mount Gilead Indians
- Communities served: Cardington, Lincoln
- Feeder schools: Cardington-Lincoln Junior High School
- Website: https://clhs.cardington.k12.oh.us/

Cardington-Lincoln High School is a public high school in Cardington, Ohio. It is the only high school in the Cardington-Lincoln Local Schools district. The high school has a long-standing and Fierce rivalry with Mount Gilead High School's Indians, five miles (8.0 km) northeast of Cardington.

== Ohio High School Athletic Association State Championships ==
- Boys Baseball – 1979

Cardington Athletics took home the MOAC ALL-SPORTS TROPHY in 2009–10.

Boys Basketball State Tournament
Year	Where	Result	Final Opponent	Won/Lost	Score
1998	St. Johns Arena	4th Place	Fisher Catholic	Lost	62-79

Boys MOAC Records
Event	Result	Record holder	Year
Long Jump	22' 11½"	Shane Ames	2003
400M Dash	:49.3	Silas Jolliff	2009
4x400M Relay	3:28.0	Silas Jolliff, Clint Osborne, Clay Osborne, DJ Bowers	2009

Girls MOAC Records
Event	Result	Record holder	Year
3200 M	11:32.3	Caitlin Thomas	2007

Boys Undefeated Football Team
Event	Result	Year
Football	No Playoff Appearance	1990

Cardington recorded perfect seasons in 1950 and 1990, but the 1990 squad did not qualify for the playoffs. They Made the Playoffs in the 2020 Season When the Ohio High School Athletic Association had all teams Qualify due to the COVID-19 pandemic. They Defeated Fisher Catholic 68–43 before getting Eliminated by Danville 46–20 the Following Week.
