= Champion Local School District =

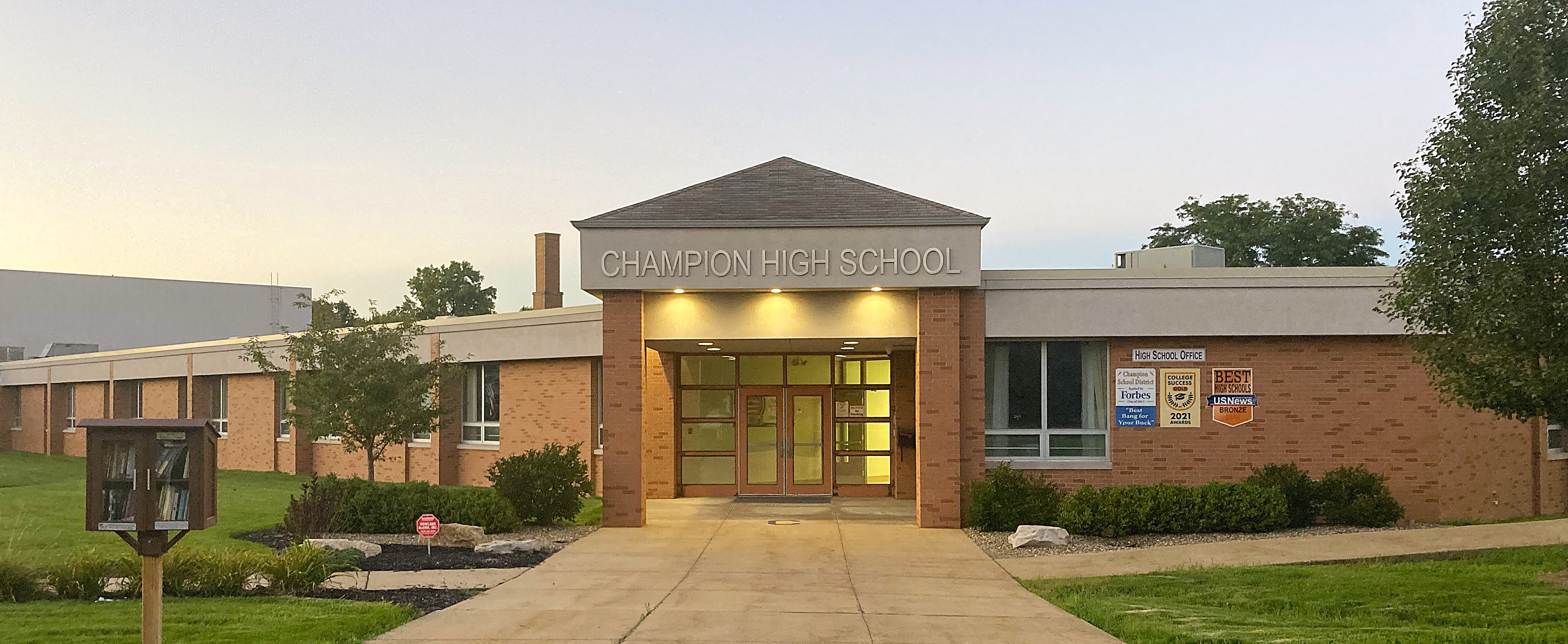
- Champion High School built in 1957

Location
- 5976 Mahoning Avenue NW; Warren, Ohio 44483; United States

Information
- Type: Public, Coeducational high school
- Established: 1832
- Superintendent: John Grabowski
- Teaching staff: 71.52 (FTE)
- Grades: PK-12
- Enrollment: 1,147 (2024-25)
- Student to teacher ratio: 16.04
- Colors: Purple & Gold
- Team name: Flashes
- Website: www.championlocal.org

The Champion Local School District is a school district located in Champion Township in Trumbull County, Ohio, United States. The school district serves one high school, one middle school and one elementary school. All Champion schools are located on the same property, with the high school having its own building, and the middle and elementary school sharing a building adjacent to the high school.

== History ==
Champion Local School District was formed in April 1832, with the school district having just one school building. Voters in Champion Township approved a $6,500 bond to construct Champion High School, which was built in 1915. The school was used until 1957, when Champion built its current high school campus. In 1949, Champion constructed Champion Central High School

In the 1960s, Champion built Kiser Elementary, housing students grades K-6, Champion Junior High was built just a few years after, originally housing students grades 7–9, which was eventually changed to 6–8, and the name being changed to Champion Middle School.

As enrollment grew in the 70s, additions were added to the high school, including new classrooms and a new band room as well as a 1,040-seat auditorium. More renovations took place in the 90s, with five new classrooms, a computer lab, administration office area, a front entrance with new parking, and additional restrooms. Champion renovated other classrooms as well. Following the new additions, part of the southeast wing of the school was demolished.

In August 2018, the district moved middle and elementary school students into the new PK-8 facility, built adjacent to the high school. Voters approved a $4.4 million bond, which raised sue which raised $13.8 million for the project, and the Ohio School Facilities Commission paid $17.5 million, costing the project $30.487 million. Central Elementary School and Champion Middle School was demolished in 2018.

== Schools ==
=== High School ===
- Champion High School

=== Middle School ===
- Champion Middle School

=== Elementary School ===
- Champion Central Elementary School

=== Former Schools ===
- Kiser Elementary
