= Collin Dixon =

American football player (born 2004)

No. 17 – Illinois Fighting Illini
- Position: Wide receiver
- Class: Senior

Personal information
- Born: November 22, 2004 (age 21)
- Listed height: 6 ft 1 in (1.85 m)
- Listed weight: 215 lb (98 kg)

Career information
- High school: Tallmadge (Tallmadge, Ohio)
- College: Illinois (2023–present)
- Stats at ESPN

Collin Dixon (born November 22, 2004) is an American college football wide receiver for the Illinois Fighting Illini.

== Early life ==
Dixon attended Tallmadge High School in Tallmadge, Ohio. He played football, basketball and ran track. During his high school career, Dixon had 201 receptions for 3,561 yards and 43 touchdowns. He originally committed to the University of Wisconsin–Madison to play college football before flipping his commitment to the University of Illinois Urbana-Champaign.

== College career ==
After redshirting his first year at Illinois in 2023, Dixon started 10 of 13 games in 2024 and had 18 receptions for 264 yards. He started all 13 games in 2025, recording 35 receptions for 548 receiving yards and five touchdowns. Dixon entered the 2026 season as Illinois' number one receiver and was named a team captain.
