= Carroll, Ohio =

- Village
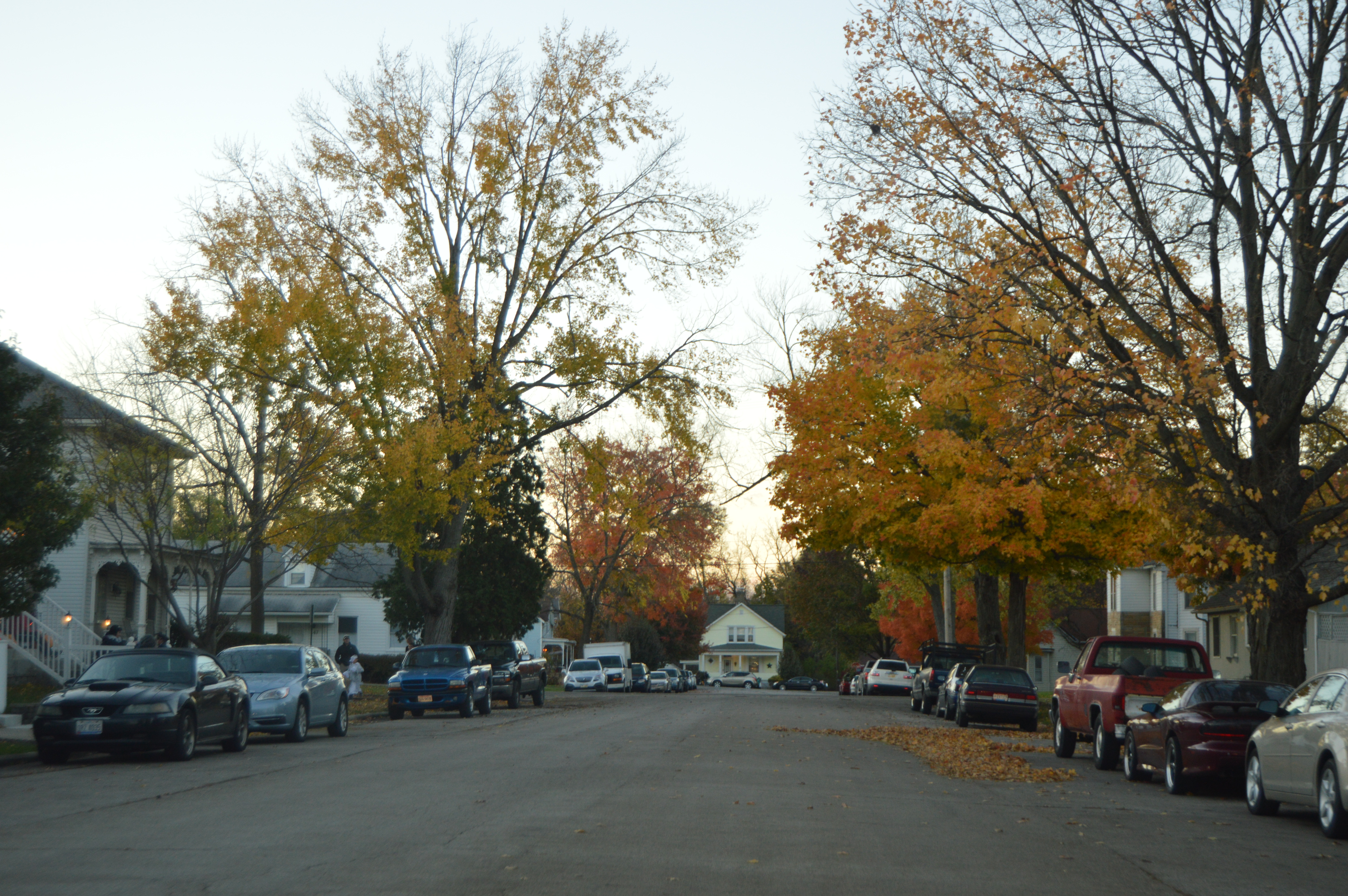
- Market Street north of Lock Street

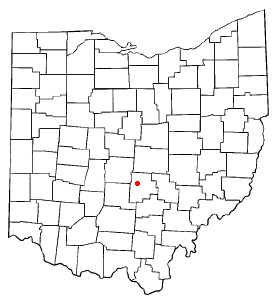
- Location of Carroll, Ohio

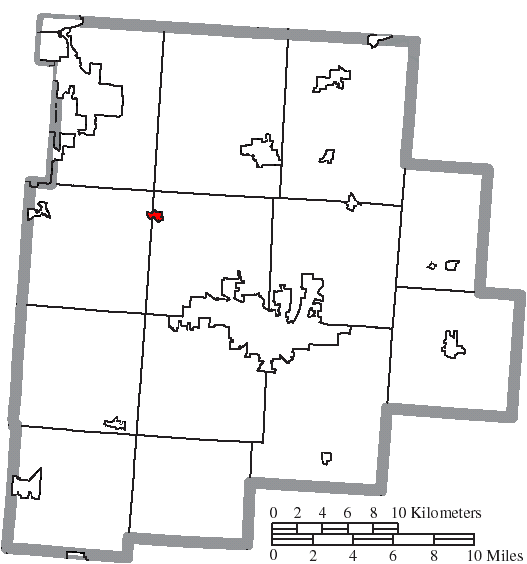
- Location of Carroll in Fairfield County
- Coordinates: 39°48′09″N 82°42′22″W
- Country: United States
- State: Ohio
- County: Fairfield

Government
  - Type: Mayor-council
  - Mayor: Preston Barringer

Area
  - Total: 0.63 sq mi (1.63 km^{2})
  - Land: 0.63 sq mi (1.63 km^{2})
  - Water: 0 sq mi (0.00 km^{2})
- Elevation: 820 ft (250 m)

Population (2020)
  - Total: 501
  - Estimate (2023): 500
  - Density: 796.1/sq mi (307.38/km^{2})
- Time zone: UTC-5 (Eastern (EST))
  - Summer (DST): UTC-4 (EDT)
- ZIP code: 43112
- Area code: 740
- FIPS code: 39-12252
- GNIS feature ID: 2397562
- Website: ci.carroll.oh.us

Carroll is a village in Fairfield County, Ohio, United States. The population was 501 at the 2020 census.

== History ==
Carroll was laid out in 1829 at the junction of two canals. The village was named after Charles Carroll of Carrollton (1737–1832), American politician, delegate to the second Continental Congress, and last surviving signer of the Declaration of Independence.

== Geography ==
According to the United States Census Bureau, the village has a total area of 0.32 square miles (0.83 km^{2}), all land.

== Demographics ==
Historical population
Census	Pop.	Note	%±
1870	187		—
1880	288		54.0%
1890	293		1.7%
1900	223		−23.9%
1910	284		27.4%
1920	348		22.5%
1930	351		0.9%
1940	337		−4.0%
1950	416		23.4%
1960	444		6.7%
1970	614		38.3%
1980	641		4.4%
1990	558		−12.9%
2000	488		−12.5%
2010	524		7.4%
2020	501		−4.4%
2023 (est.)	500	▼	−0.2%
U.S. Decennial Census

=== 2010 census ===
As of the census of 2010, there were 524 people, 208 households, and 147 families living in the village. The population density was 1,637.5 inhabitants per square mile (632.2/km^{2}). There were 218 housing units at an average density of 681.3 per square mile (263.1/km^{2}). The racial makeup of the village was 96.2% White, 0.6% African American, 0.4% Native American, 0.2% Asian, and 2.7% from two or more races.

There were 208 households, of which 36.5% had children under the age of 18 living with them, 45.2% were married couples living together, 18.3% had a female householder with no husband present, 7.2% had a male householder with no wife present, and 29.3% were non-families. 24.0% of all households were made up of individuals, and 9.2% had someone living alone who was 65 years of age or older. The average household size was 2.52 and the average family size was 2.94.

The median age in the village was 38 years. 25.4% of residents were under the age of 18; 10.1% were between the ages of 18 and 24; 26.9% were from 25 to 44; 23.9% were from 45 to 64; and 13.7% were 65 years of age or older. The gender makeup of the village was 51.0% male and 49.0% female.

=== 2000 census ===
As of the census of 2000, there were 488 people, 189 households, and 130 families living in the village. The population density was 1,777.3 inhabitants per square mile (686.2/km^{2}). There were 205 housing units at an average density of 746.6 per square mile (288.3/km^{2}). The racial makeup of the village was 99.59% White, 0.20% Native American and 0.20% Asian. Hispanic or Latino of any race were 0.20% of the population.

There were 189 households, out of which 34.4% had children under the age of 18 living with them, 52.9% were married couples living together, 12.2% had a female householder with no husband present, and 30.7% were non-families. 27.0% of all households were made up of individuals, and 9.5% had someone living alone who was 65 years of age or older. The average household size was 2.58 and the average family size was 3.12.

In the village, the population was spread out, with 26.8% under the age of 18, 9.8% from 18 to 24, 31.4% from 25 to 44, 20.5% from 45 to 64, and 11.5% who were 65 years of age or older. The median age was 34 years. For every 100 females there were 89.9 males. For every 100 females age 18 and over, there were 90.9 males.

The median income for a household in the village was $40,221, and the median income for a family was $41,250. Males had a median income of $31,354 versus $22,344 for females. The per capita income for the village was $16,311. About 4.0% of families and 5.7% of the population were below the poverty line, including 3.5% of those under age 18 and 18.8% of those age 65 or over.

== Education ==
The Bloom-Carroll Local School District operates an elementary, middle, and high school in the village. Carroll has a public library, a branch of the Fairfield County District Library.

== Notable people ==
- David Brandt, early adopter of no-till farming and cover crops
- Tom Crabtree, professional football player for the Green Bay Packers
- James J. Jeffries, World Heavyweight Boxing Champion known as "The Boilermaker"
