= Knox Morrow Athletic Conference =

The Knox Morrow Athletic Conference is an Ohio High School Athletic Association (OHSAA) league that began competition in the 2017-18 school year. Its members are located in the Ohio counties of Knox, Morrow, and Ashland

== Members ==
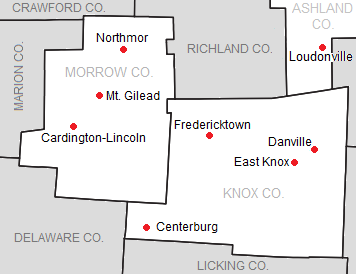
KMAC league membership.

School	Nickname	Location	Colors	Notes
Cardington-Lincoln	Pirates	Cardington	Red, Black, & White	
Centerburg	Trojans	Centerburg	Red & White	
Danville	Blue Devils	Danville	Blue & White	
East Knox	Bulldogs	Howard	Purple & White	
Fredericktown	Freddies	Fredericktown	Red & Gray	
Loudonville	Redbirds	Loudonville	Red & Gray	Football joined in 2022, all other sports joined in 2024
Mount Gilead	Indians	Mount Gilead	Purple & White	
Northmor	Golden Knights	Galion (North Bloomfield Twp.)	Black, Gold, & White	

== History ==
The KMAC was formed in November 2015, when seven schools from the Blue Division of the MOAC (Cardington, Centerburg, East Knox, Fredericktown, Highland, Mount Gilead, and Northmor) announced that they would withdraw from the MOAC to form a new league with Danville of the MBC.

In March 2020, Highland announced they would return to the MOAC for the 2021-22 school year, except for football which would return to the MOAC in 2022.

In May 2020, the KMAC announced that Loudonville would become a football-only member of the league beginning in the 2022-23 school year. In March 2023, Loudonville's Board of Education approved joining the KMAC as a full-fledged member beginning with the 2024-25 school year.
