= Centerburg High School =

Location
- 3782 Columbus Road; Centerburg, (Knox County), Ohio 43011; United States
- Coordinates: 40°17′42″N 82°42′22″W

Information
- Type: Public, coeducational high school
- School district: Centerburg Local Schools
- Superintendent: Mike Hebenthal
- Principal: Ryan Gallwitz
- Teaching staff: 20.00 (FTE)
- Grades: 9–12
- Student to teacher ratio: 15.10
- Colors: Red and white
- Athletics conference: Knox Morrow Athletic Conference (KMAC)
- Mascot: Trojan
- Team name: Trojans
- Rival: Fredericktown Freddies
- Newspaper: The Trojan Crier
- Athletic Director: Rich Porter
- Website: www.centerburgschools.org/page/high-school

Centerburg High School is a public high school in Centerburg, Ohio, United States. It is the only high school in the Centerburg Local Schools district, offering grades 9–12. Its mascot is the Trojan. The Trojan's boys basketball team won the MOAC blue division conference championship in 2016. A new track has been completed at the high school as of 2019. It is also one of central Ohio's only schools to have a large solar panel field providing power to its high school.

The Centerburg Trojan pride marching band is a marching based out of Centerburg High school in Ohio and is still currently operating as of 2023

== Cheating controversy ==
Centerburg High School was the center of a cheating controversy for its seniors class in 2009 that resulted in the cancellation of the graduation ceremony for that year, a day before the scheduled ceremony. A student hacked the teachers' computers to gain access to the world studies and science tests, and then shared the world studies test with other students. An investigation by the school board found that more than half of the graduating class had copies of the leaked world studies test or knew about the leak but didn't report it. The cancellation of the ceremony resulted in protests at the school which gained national media attention, and an unofficial graduation ceremony was organized by the families of the class of 2009 at Hilliar Park the day after what would have been the official graduation ceremony, of which footage was aired on local television stations.

== Ohio High School Athletic Association State Championships ==
- Girls Volleyball – 2003

Other School Facts

Centerburg's academic team (quiz bowl) has been a perennial local power over the past 4 years, advancing to the regional tournament on a regular basis. Girls basketball has reached as far as the Final Four in the 2000s, and the football team in the 2004 and 2005 seasons under head coach Brad Birchfield saw great success. They also made the state playoffs in 2013, 2014, and 2016. Boys basketball has consistently been a conference and district contender over the past few decades under coaches Simpson, Marhefka, Cauley, and Brusco. Academically, Centerburg has been one of the top schools in Knox County every year.
