= David Brandt (farmer) =

American farmer (1946–2023)

- Brandt in 2012
- Born: November 16, 1946; Carroll, Ohio, U.S.
- Died: May 21, 2023 (aged 76); Urbana, Illinois, U.S.
- Occupation: Farmer
- Known for: Pioneering sustainable agriculture techniques Being the subject of an internet meme
- Children: 2
- Military career
- Allegiance: United States
- Branch: United States Marine Corps
- Service years: 1968–1969
- Conflicts: Vietnam War
- Awards: Purple Heart (on 3 occasions)

David William Brandt (November 16, 1946 – May 21, 2023) was an American farmer known for working on sustainable agriculture techniques, specifically no-till farming and cover crops. Outside of the agriculture field, he was known on the internet as a meme, appearing in an image macro paired with the phrase "It ain't much, but it's honest work".

== Early life ==
Brandt grew up in Carroll, Ohio, in a family of farmers, and he worked on his grandfather's farm from a young age. In high school he managed a "farrow-to-finish" pig operation.

Brandt was drafted into the Vietnam War two weeks after marrying his wife, Kendra. From 1968 until 1969, Brandt served with the Marines, where he loaded tank shells as part of an armored battalion. He was injured during his service, for which he was awarded a Purple Heart.

== Career ==
After returning home from the Vietnam War, Brandt began working as a tenant farmer in 1969. Soon after his return, his father was killed in a tractor accident. After his father's death, he was forced to sell his father's land and much of his equipment. He and his wife, Kendra, began no-till farming in 1971 as a way to cut costs as they began farming on a smaller scale and budget. He also received $3000 from a program that sought to encourage farmers to try no-till techniques. That same year, he was able to buy his grandmother's farm. At the time, their farm focused on corn, soybeans, and wheat, but they also raised pigs and Charolais cattle.

In 1978 Brandt began adding hairy vetch and winter peas to his fields to control erosion and to increase nitrogen in the soil, thereby increasing crop yield.

From 1981 until 1984 Brandt worked for the USDA's Natural Resources Conservation Service as a local agriculturalist.

In 1985, Brandt stopped working as a tenant farmer. He and his family started a farm on land in Carroll, Ohio, which had originally been his grandmother's, where Brandt would work for the rest of his life. He moved away from raising livestock for profit to focus on raising crops.

In the late 1990s and early 2000s, Brandt experimented with different combinations and species of cover crops, such as radishes and sunflowers, to improve crop yield and improve soil quality. As a result of these cover crops, Brandt was able to cut back on commercial nitrogen additives, which also saved money. Additionally, Brandt saw less mold and blight and fewer insects among his crops, to the point that he was able to reduce or stop using fungicide, herbicide, and insecticide on parts of the farm.

In 2012, the USDA began a soil education program at Brandt's farm.

From 2017 until 2021 Brandt served as president of the Soil Health Academy, a nonprofit organization focused on regenerative agriculture, which he helped found. Brandt served as the president of the Ohio No-Till Council for 14 years.

Brandt worked with other farmers and organizations to provide training on his conservation techniques. He also hosted research projects on his farmland, including some run by Ohio State University. In addition to working on the farm, he also traveled and spoke at various engagements, including a NATO conference, about sustainable agriculture. In 2015 he was invited by Stéphane Le Foll, then the French Minister of Agriculture and Food, to travel to France to work with no-till farmers there after Le Foll toured Brandt's farm.

=== Recognition ===
In 2012, then-chief of the USDA-NRCS Dave White dubbed Brandt "the Obi-Wan Kenobi of healthy soil".

In March 2016, he was named a Master Farmer by Ohio Farmer Magazine.

In 2022, No-till on the Plains, an educational and farming nonprofit based in Kansas, created the No-till David Brandt Soil Legacy Award, to be given to "spotlight producers that had committed their lifework to improving soil health". The inaugural award was given to Brandt.

== Meme ==
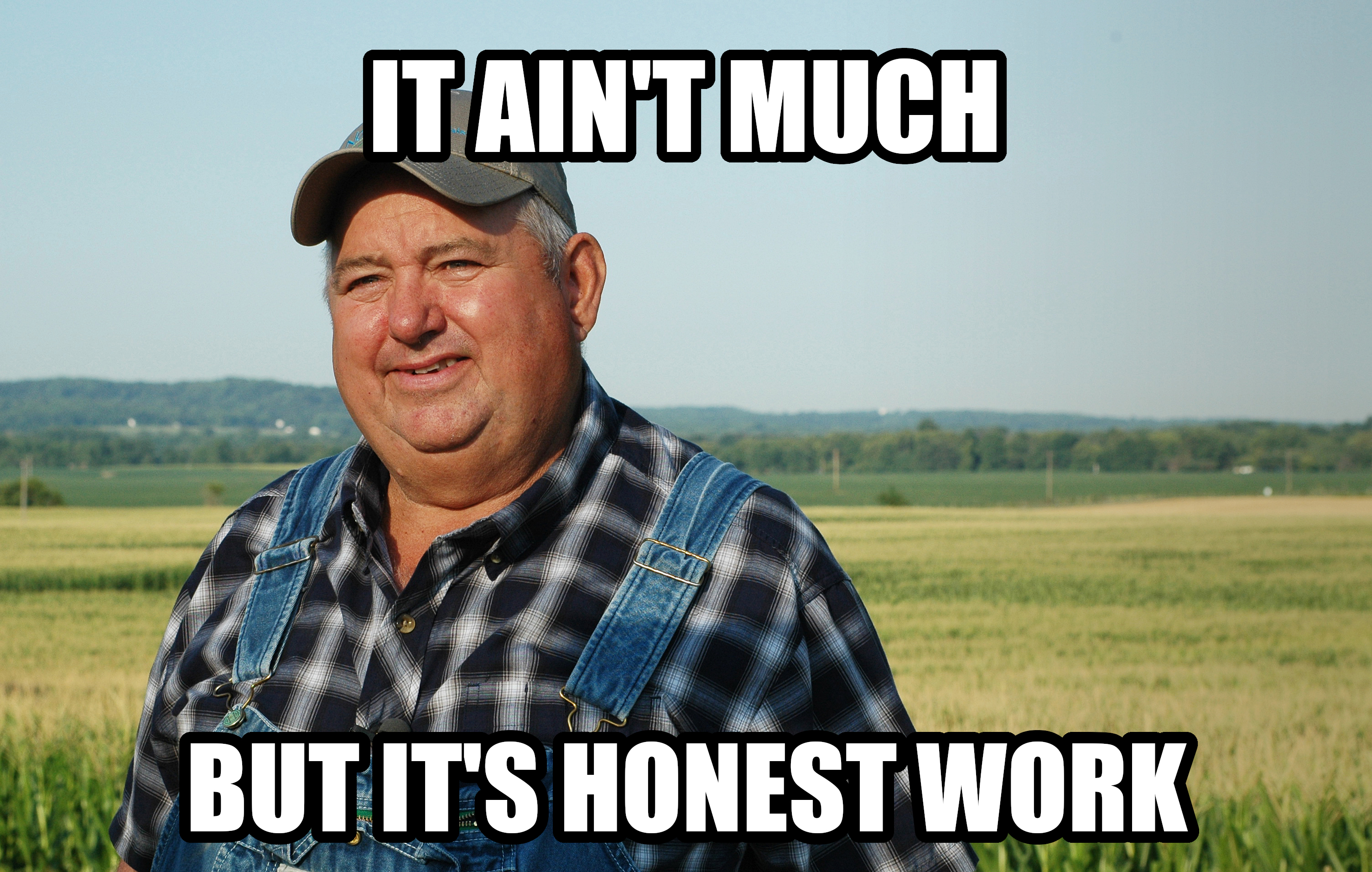
Brandt's "It ain't much but it's honest work" meme

In 2012, Brandt's photo was taken during a Natural Resources Conservation Service event. It was posted online by the USDA in 2014. It first began circling as a meme in 2018, with the first known example being posted on Reddit. The image shows Brandt standing in a field, with the tagline "It ain't much, but it's honest work". Brandt said he enjoyed being a meme, and he frequently used the catchphrase, although he suggested that his high school English teacher would not have approved of his usage of "ain't".

== Personal life ==
Brandt met his wife, Kendra, in high school, and the two married in the mid-1960s prior to his deployment. They had two children, Amy and Jay. Kendra died in 2020 from cancer. His son, daughter-in-law, and grandson worked with Brandt on the farm.

=== Death ===
On May 18, 2023, Brandt traveled to Champaign, Illinois, to pick up some red corn for his farm. While driving back to Ohio eastbound on I-74, at approximately 1:15 PM, he lost control of his truck and was ejected from the truck in neighboring Urbana, Illinois. He was hospitalized at the Carle Foundation Hospital in a medically induced coma, where he died at approximately 1:30 AM on May 21, at the age of 76.
