= Simeon Prior =

- Born: May 16, 1754; Norwich, Connecticut
- Died: June 29, 1837 (aged 83); Northampton, Ohio, US
- Burial place: Harrington Cemetery in Summit County, Ohio
- Spouse: Katharine
- Military career
- Branch: Army
- Service years: 1776-1777
- Other work: settled Northampton Township, Ohio

Simeon Prior (May 16, 1754 – June 29, 1837) was a blacksmith and Revolutionary War soldier, who in 1802 along with his family founded Northampton Township, Ohio, now a part of Cuyahoga Falls, Ohio. The original family farm was located in what was called the Connecticut Western Reserve on the eastern shoulder of the Cuyahoga Valley.

== Early life ==
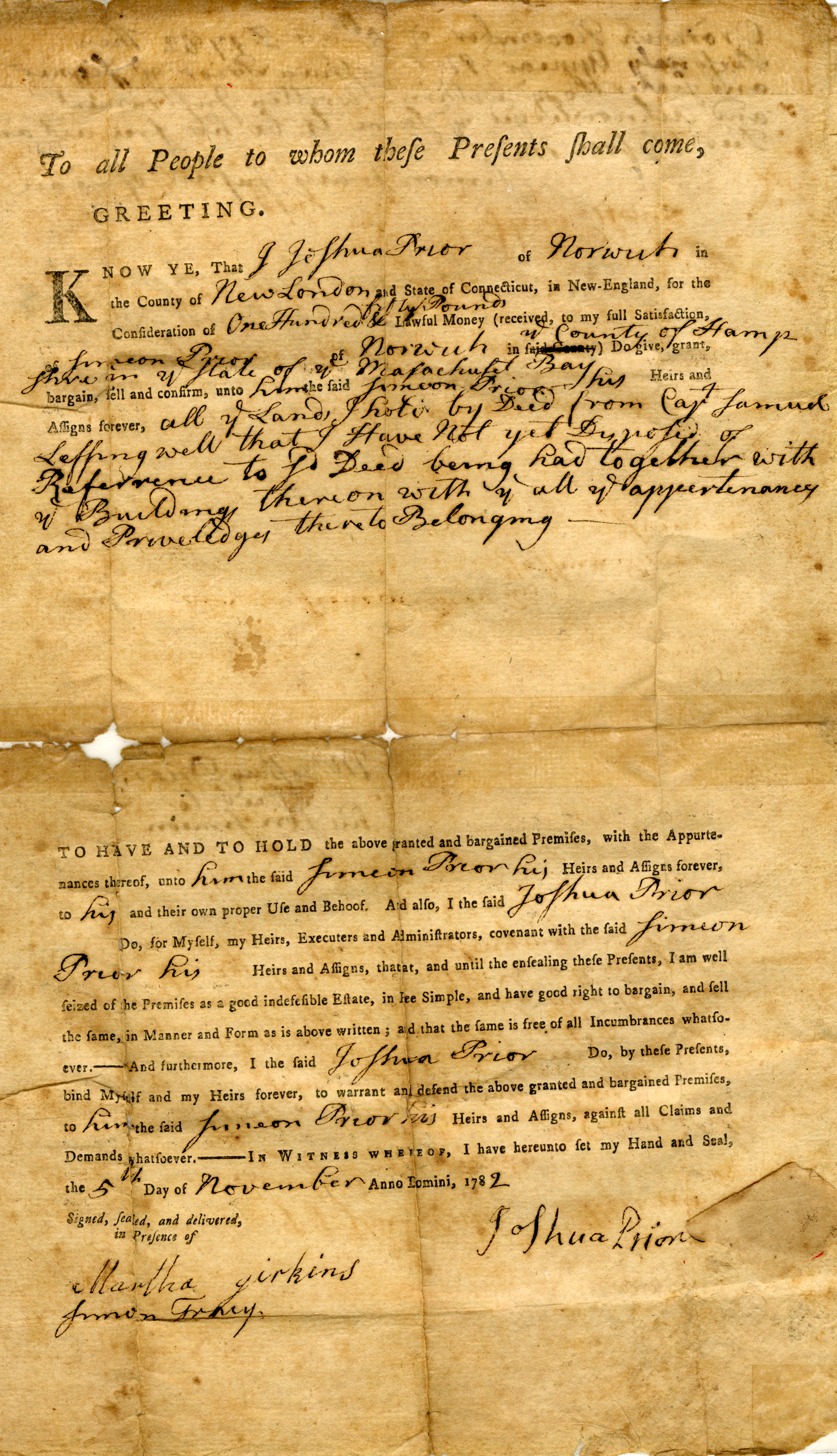
1782 deed to Simeon Prior's first farm in Norwich Connecticut, purchased from his father Joshua Prior, a year after Simeon married Katharine Wight. From the Prior Family Archive.

Simeon Prior was born on May 16, 1754, in Norwich Connecticut. The Prior Family Archive contains a land deed of Simeon's first farm in Norwich, where his first children were born. Later the family bought land and moved to his wife's hometown of Northampton, MA.

== American Revolutionary War Service ==
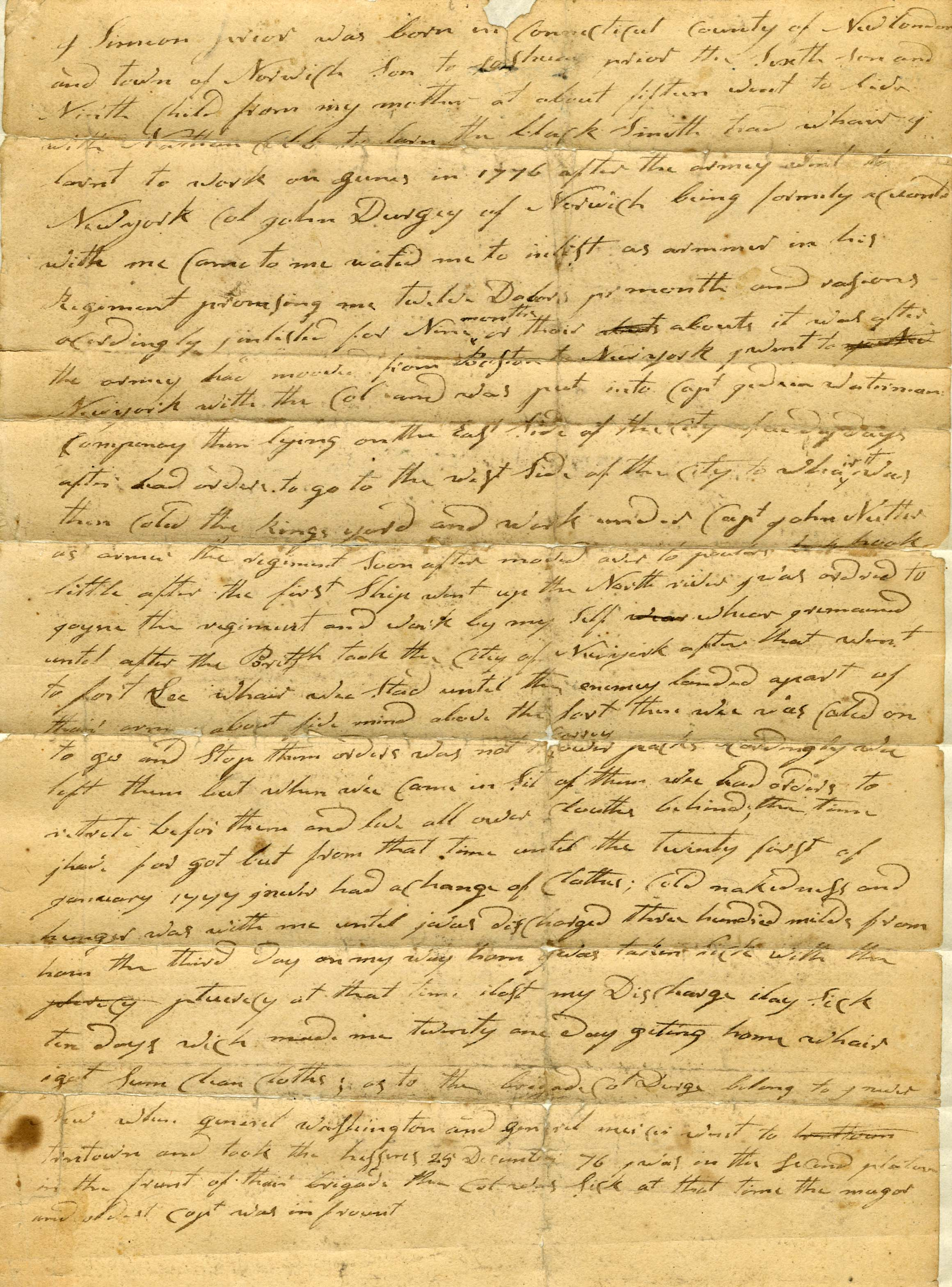
Simeon Prior's handwritten account of his service during the American Revolution. From the Prior Family Archive.

During the American Revolutionary War, Prior was asked by Colonel John Durgey of Norwich, Connecticut, to be an armorer for the regiment the Colonel was raising. Prior enlisted for a 9-month term and accompanied Colonel Durgey to New York. He later joined a regiment on Painter's Hook.

He served in the unit that provided escort and bodyguard services to George Washington. He was present during the crossing of the Delaware River after the Battle of Trenton.

His pension petition for service during the war was submitted by Mr. Elisha Whittlesey.

== Marriage ==
He married Katharine Wight on January 1, 1781, in New England.

== Settling Northampton ==
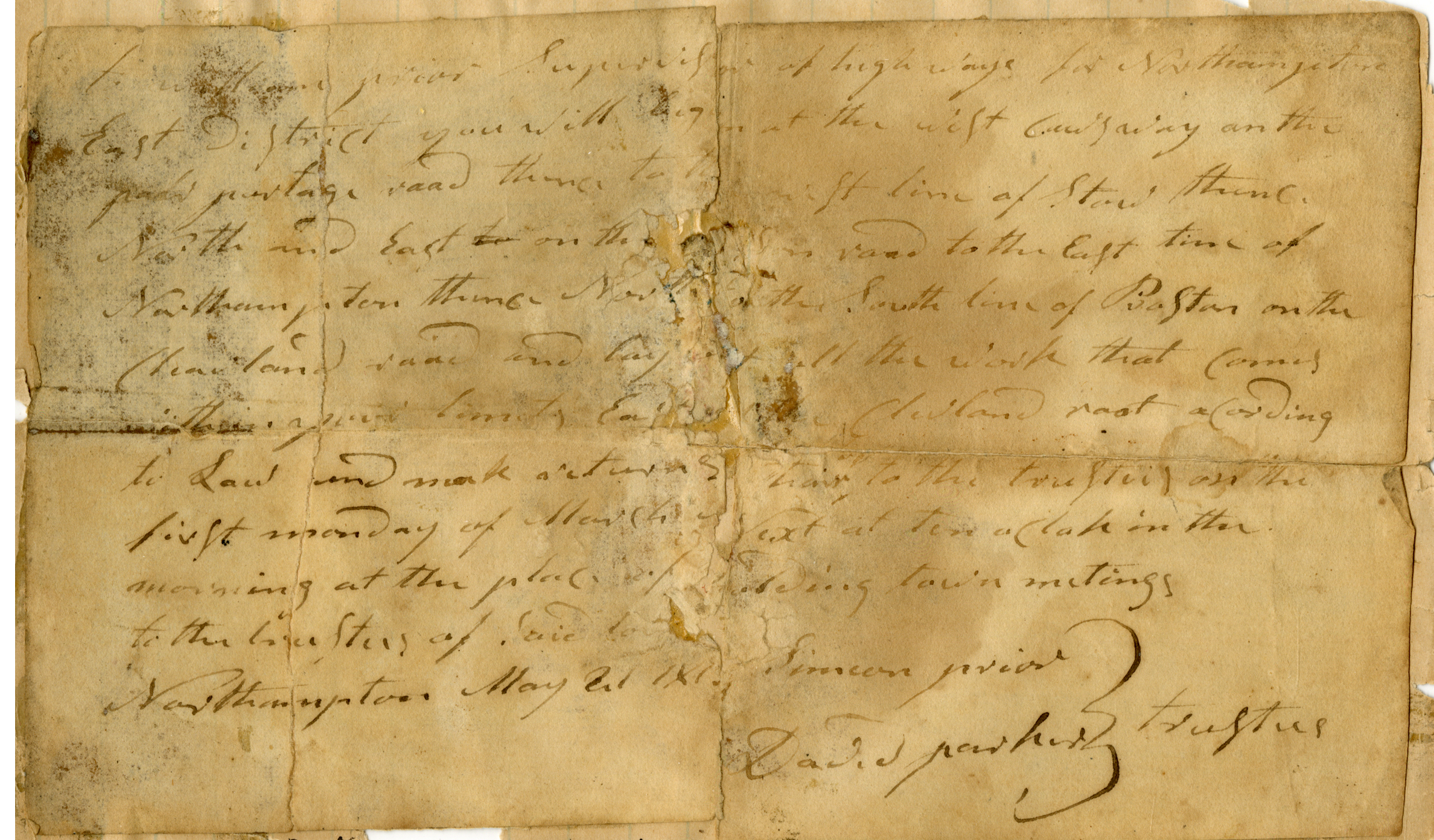
This is the oldest know record of Northampton Township, Ohio, from 1810. The record orders William Prior, supervisor of highways to build a road, and is signed by township trustees Simeon Prior and David Parker. From the Prior Family Archive.

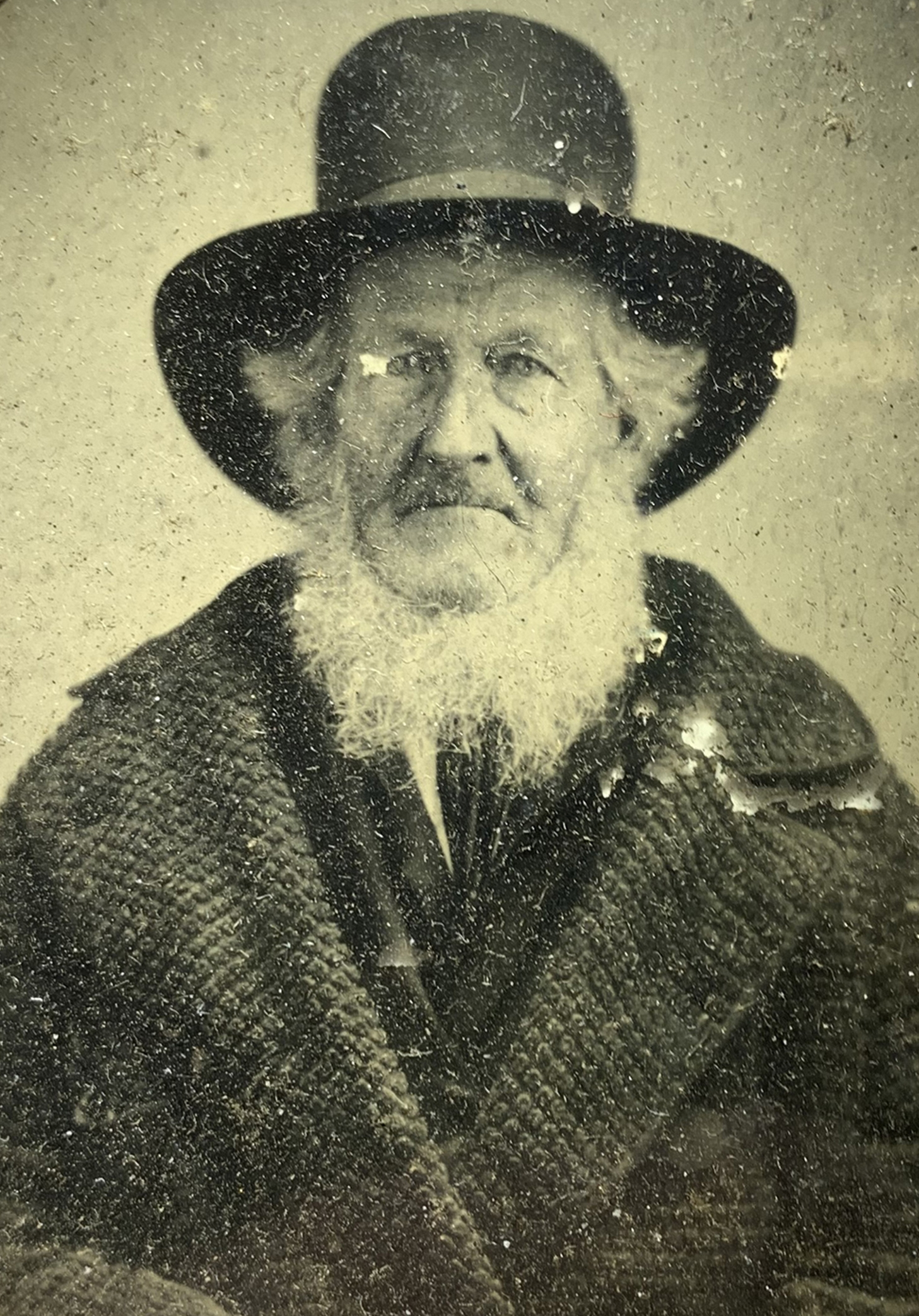
Pioneer William Prior Sr. ambrotype photograph c. 1850. In 1802, William Prior traveled from New England to the Connecticut Western Reserve as an adult, along with his father and mother Simeon and Katharine Prior and nine of his sisters and brothers and settled on the eastern shoulder of the Cuyahoga Valley in what is now Cuyahoga Falls, Ohio. From the Prior Family Archive.

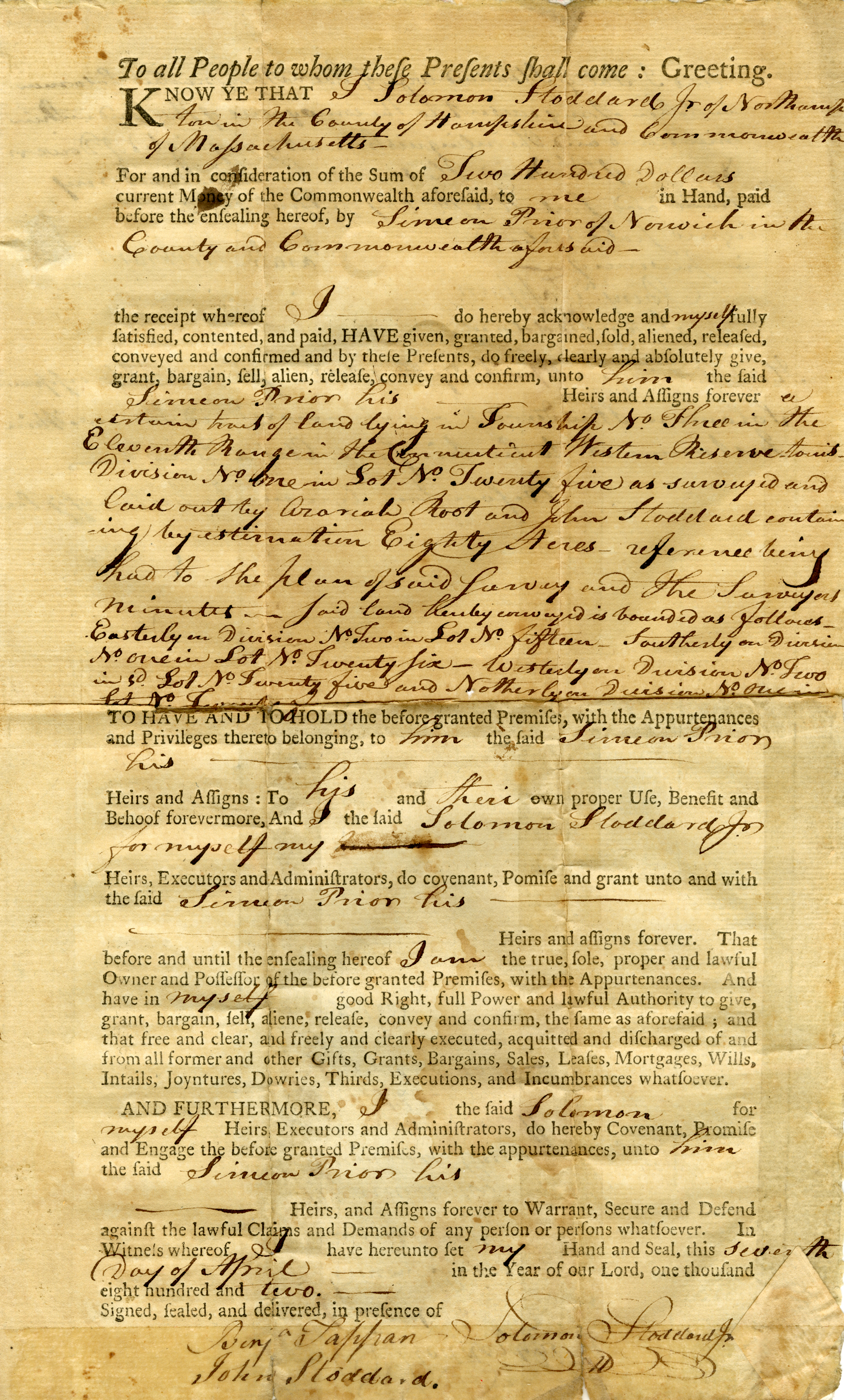
This image is of the 1802 Connecticut Western Reserve Lot 25 deed for the Prior Family settlement. From the Prior Family Archive.

Prior moved to Northampton Township, Ohio, with Katharine and their ten children in 1802. He named the township for Northampton, Massachusetts, where he had previously resided. The Prior farm consisted of 400 acres. Other settlers had joined them in establishing a community by 1809. In 1810, Simeon Prior and David Parker were Trustees of Northampton Township, and Simeon's oldest son William Prior Sr. was Supervisor of Highways. An artifact from the Prior Family Archive details this information, and is the oldest known existing government record for Northampton Township.

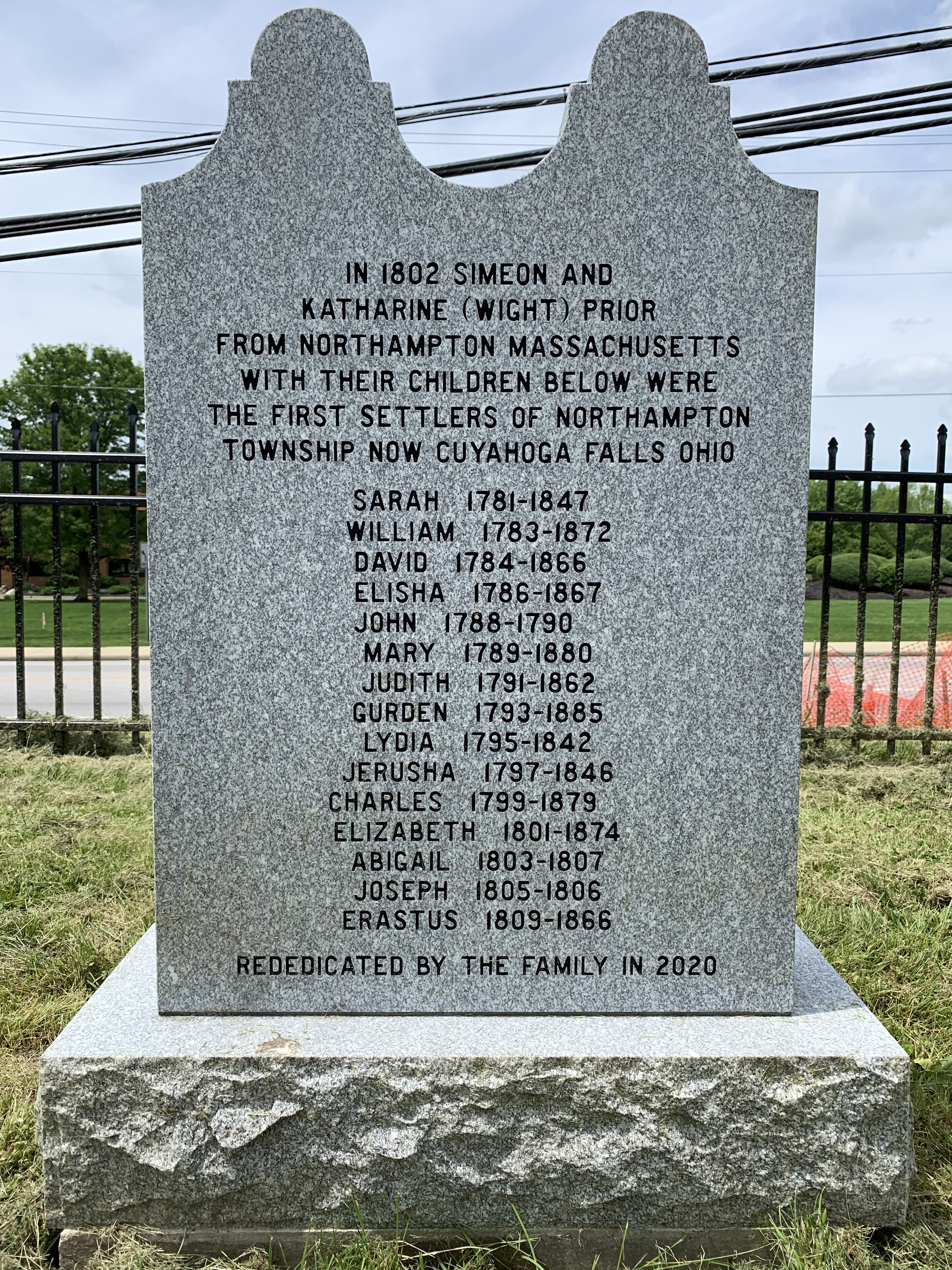
The back of the new Simeon and Katharine Prior headstone, installed June of 2020.

== Death and legacy ==
Simeon died on June 29, 1837, and was buried on his property at the corner of Chart and State Roads, in Cuyahoga Falls, Ohio. Simeon and Katherine Prior's bodies were later moved to Harrington Cemetery in Summit County, Ohio.

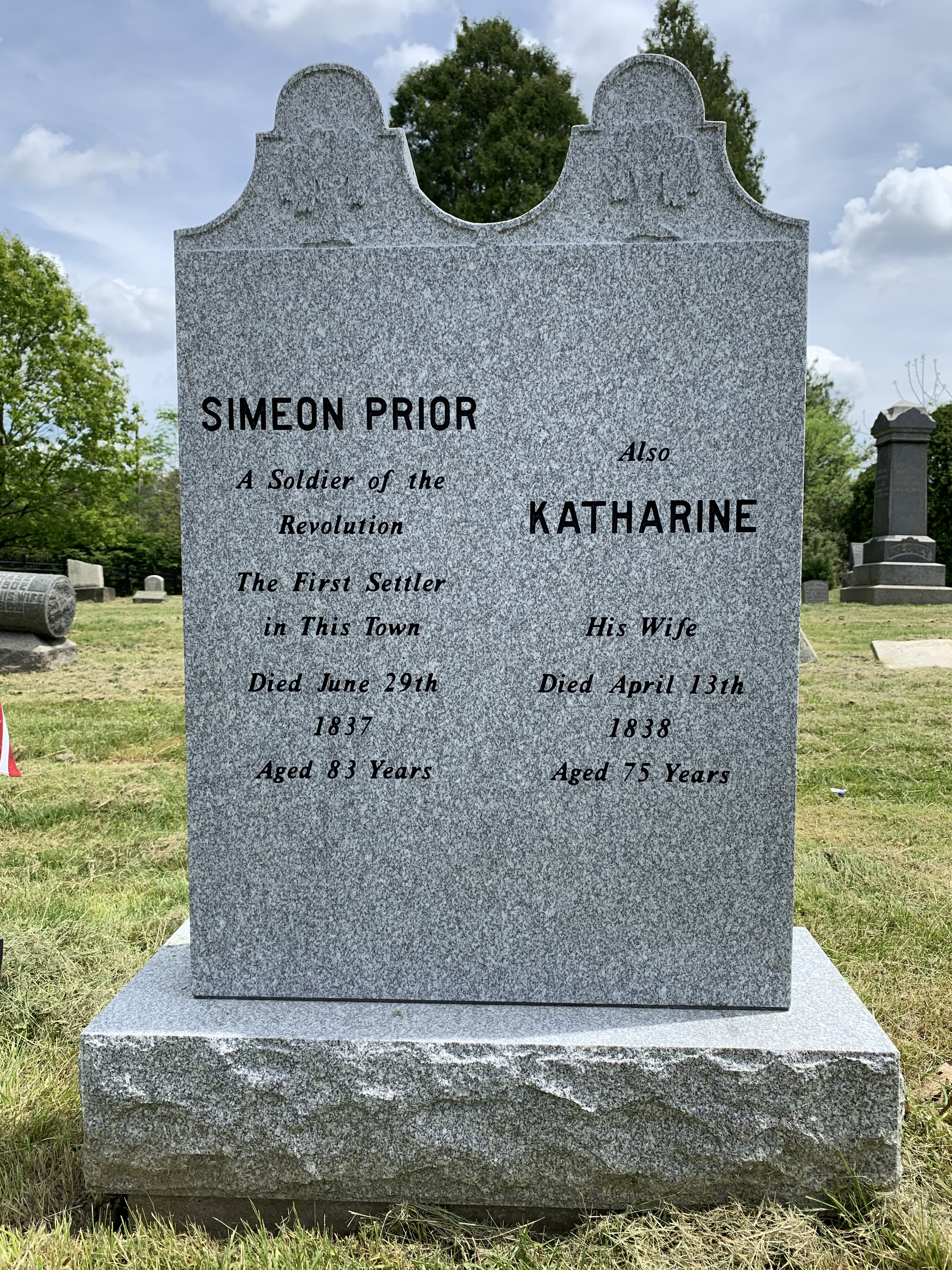
The front of the new Simeon and Katharine Prior headstone, installed June of 2020.

The Prior Family monument is located in Harrington Cemetery located in Cuyahoga Falls, Ohio.

On June 24, 2020, descendants of Simeon and Katharine Prior, Chapters of Sons and Daughters of the American Revolution, and color guard of Cuyahoga Falls Police and Fire Fighters, gathered to dedicate a new headstone for Simeon and his wife Katharine. Kenneth Clarke and Emery Prior, both direct descendants of Simeon, collaborated to replace the weatherworn and mostly indecipherable marble headstone of Northampton Ohio's founders with a new headstone carved out of granite from Barre, Vermont. The front of the new headstone copies the text of the old headstone and on the back are the names of Simeon's children and a short history of the family. The new text on the back of the stone reads as such: in 1802 Simeon and Katharine (Wight) Prior from Northampton, Massachusetts, with their children below, were the first settlers of Northampton Township, now Cuyahoga Falls, Ohio. Sarah, 1781–1847; William, 1783–1872; David, 1784–1866; Elisha, 1786– 1867; John 1788–1790; Mary, 1789–1880; Judith, 1791–1862; Gurden, 179 3–1885; Lydia, 1795–1842; Jerusha, 1797–1846; Charles, 1799–1879; Elizabeth, 1801–1874; Abigail, 1803–1807; Joseph, 1805–1806; Erastus, 1809–1866. Rededicated by the Family in 2020. The old headstone artifact is now part of the Cuyahoga Falls Historical Society collection.

In September 2020, Kenneth Clarke published the book "Wolves and Flax: The Prior Family in the Cuyahoga Wilderness," based on the Prior Family Archive and other historical texts. The book received reviews in the Cleveland Plain Dealer, the Akron Beacon Journal and other print and online news sources.
