= Kenneth A. Clarke =

American non-profit administrator

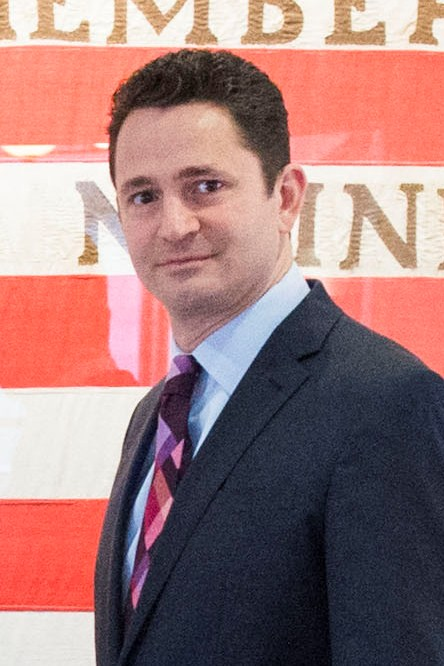
- Education: Taylor University; Miami University
- Occupations: Non-profit & arts management
- Writing career
- Subjects: Development, Executive leadership, Military history, Animal Welfare

Kenneth A. Clarke (or Ken Clarke) serves as the executive director for Rescue Village, a humane society located in Geauga County, Ohio. He had previously served as the president and CEO of Pritzker Military Museum and Library in Chicago. He has also authored, published, edited and produced works as Kenneth Clarke and KC Clarke.

== Early life ==
Clarke's family has served in the military in every generation between the American Revolution and World War II, including Simeon Prior – something he credits with his interest in military history and the citizen soldier.

He earned his BA in English and political science from Taylor University in 1992. Following that, he studied for a MA in English at Miami University (1994).

== Career ==
Clarkes career has primarily been in the non-profit sector, with roles at the Ohio Historical Society, John G Shedd Aquarium, Ohio State University, The Poetry Center at the School of the Art Institute and Safer Foundation.

While Clarke was at the Poetry Center, it began publishing its annual anthology Hands on Stanzas.

At Pritzker Military Museum and Library, Clarke first served as Vice President of Administration and Operations. He began producing and hosting episodes of Pritzker Military Presents and Citizen Soldier, the library's two web and television programs. He took over as the museum's president and CEO in 2012. While at the Pritzker Military Museum and Library he created, and was one of the architects of the World War One Centennial Commission's 100 Cities/100 Memorials matching grant program sponsored by the Pritzker Military Museum and Library that helped communities across the United States renovate World War One monuments.

Clarke joined Blockland Cleveland, a technology focused economic development initiative of JumpStart, Inc. and other Cleveland organizations in 2018.

Clarke joined Rescue Village, also known as the Geauga County Humane Society, in March 2021.

Clarke is a former board member of the USO of Illinois, and a former board member of National History Day. Clarke is a member of Sons of the American Revolution.

== Awards ==
In 2003, Clarke received Columbia College’s Paul Berger Arts Entrepreneurship Award for "outstanding not-for-profit management".

In 2004, New City Chicago's Annual Lit50 list featured Clarke as #13 for producing "readings by Billy Corgan and Lucinda Williams and Miller Williams". The following year, he was placed at #23 for "securing The Poetry Center's archive at The University of Chicago Library".

Also in 2004, Mayor Richard M. Daley appointed Clarke to the advisory board of the City of Chicago Department of Cultural Affairs.

== Publications and Exhibits ==
Books

1. The Poetry Center of Chicago Broadside Series, 2001 - 2005, Curator, Designer, Illustrator (on select broadsides)
2. Hands on Stanzas 2001-2002 Anthology of Poetry, 2002, Editor
3. Lawrence Ferlinghetti Live at The Poetry Center, 2002, Executive Director, Producer
4. Hands on Stanzas 2002-2003 Anthology of Poetry, 2003, Editor
5. Hands on Stanzas 2003-2004 Anthology of Poetry, 2004, Editor
6. reVerse, 2004, Various Artist, Director, Executive Producer, Producer
7. Hands on Stanzas 2004-2005 Anthology of Poetry, 2005, Editor
8. The Poetry Center of Chicago, When It Began, 2005, Author
9. On War: The Best Military Histories, 2013, Executive Editor
10. The History and Heritage of U.S. Navy SEALs, 2014, Executive Editor
11. Dignity of Duty: The Journals of Erasmus Corwin Gilbreath, 1861-1898, 2015, Executive Editor
12. The General: From Normandy to Dachau to Service in America, 2016, Executive Editor
13. Let We Forget: The Great War, 2018, Executive Editor and Creative Director
14. Zero to Hero: From Bullied Kid to Warrior, 2019, Executive Editor and Creative Director
15. Wolves and Flax: The Prior Family in the Cuyahoga Valley Wilderness, 2020, Author
16. The Cartoons of Rescue Village: Twenty Year of Love and Lifesaving Through the Eyes of Cartoonist Jenny Campbell, 2023, Editor and Creative Director

Exhibits

1. SEAL: The Unspoken Sacrifice, 2013, Creative Director
2. Our Work: Modern Jobs - Ancient Origins, August 28, 2014 – April 24, 2016, Exhibit Feature
3. Dignity of Duty: A Personal Odyssey of Service from the Civil War to the Spanish-American War, 2015, Creative Director
4. Faces of War: Documenting the Vietnam War from the Front Lines, 2015, Creative Director
5. Hunting Charlie: Finding the Enemy in the Vietnam War, 2016, Creative Director
6. Lest We Forget: Sammies, Sailors and Doughboys Over There in World War I, 2018, Creative Director

== Personal life ==
Clarke lives in Ohio.
