= Danville High School (Ohio) =

Location
- 10 West Rambo Street; Danville, (Knox County), Ohio 43014; United States
- Coordinates: 40°26′51″N 82°15′39″W

Information
- Type: Public, coeducational high school
- Superintendent: Jason Snively
- Principal: Ed Honabarger
- Teaching staff: 19.00 (FTE)
- Grades: 9–12
- Average class size: 10–20
- Student to teacher ratio: 12.89
- Campus type: public
- Colors: Blue and white
- Athletics: Football, volleyball, golf, basketball, wrestling, track and field, softball, baseball
- Athletics conference: Knox Morrow Athletic Conference (KMAC)
- Team name: Blue Devils
- Rival: East Knox High School
- Newspaper: The Beacon
- Athletic Director: Matthew Moore
- Website: https://www.danvilleschools.org/

Danville High School is a public high school in Danville, Ohio, United States. It is the only high school in the Danville Local School district. Their mascot is the Blue Devils.

There are 183 students enrolled at Danville High School and the graduation rate is 91%.

== Athletics and extracurricular opportunities ==
Danville High School offers nine sports to students: football, golf, volleyball, cheerleading, basketball (girls' and boys'), wrestling, track and field, baseball, and softball.

Danville won the 2008 Girls' Softball Ohio High School Athletic Association state championship, the first state title in any sport in school history.

As part of their academic curriculum, students have the opportunity to participate in choirs, bands, newspaper, and agricultural science (FFA). There are additional opportunities including Mock Trial, Speech and Debate, and Theater. Danville's Mock Trial team has made a state appearance every year since 2009.

In 2019, Danville's Moot Court team won the state title.

=== State championships ===
- Softball - 2008, 2026
