= Tallmadge High School =

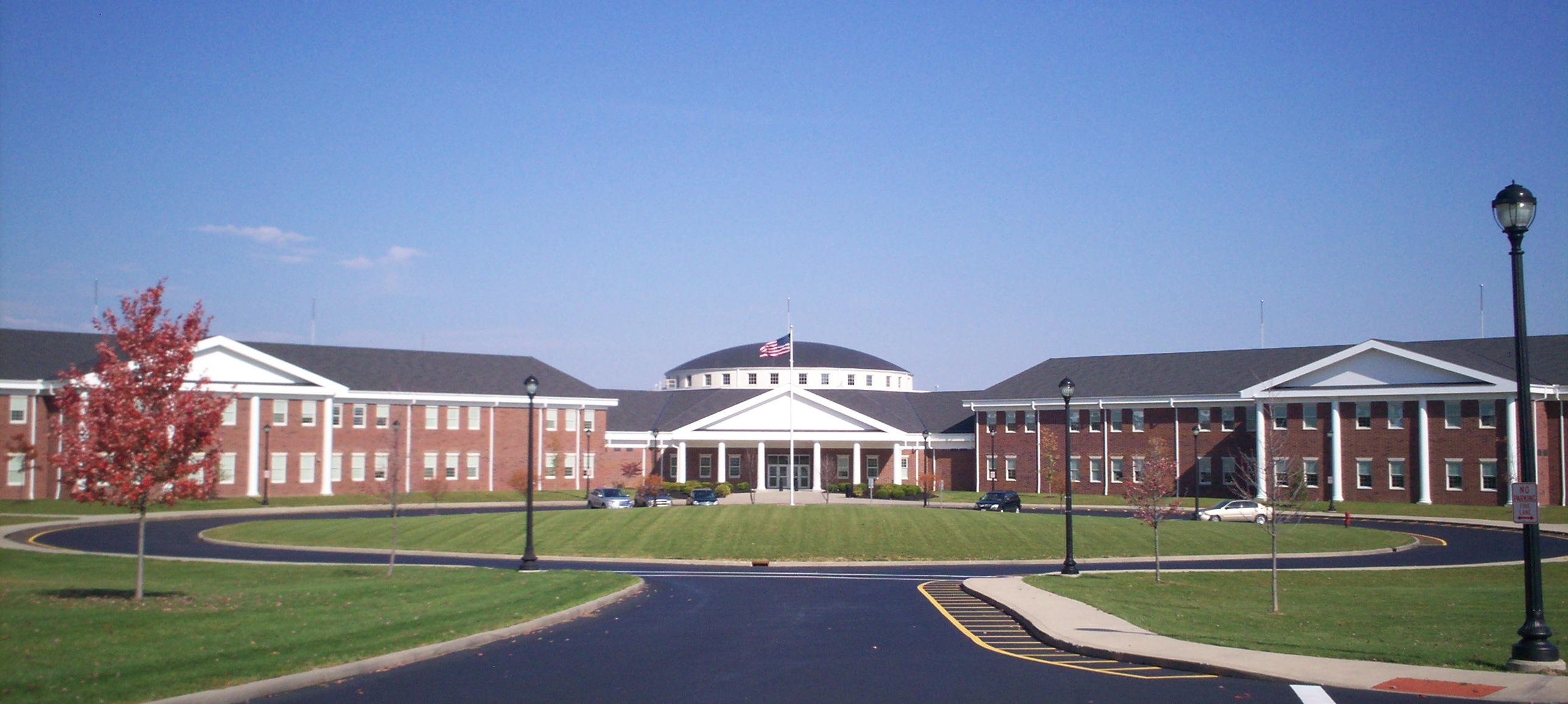

Location
- 140 North Munroe Road; Tallmadge, Ohio 44278; United States; 41°6′18.46″N 81°24′47.16″W

Information
- Funding type: Public
- Motto: Tradition, Vision, Excellence
- Founded: 1879
- School district: Tallmadge City School District
- NCES School ID: 390448801758
- Principal: Mark Horner
- Staff: 48.33 (FTE)
- Grades: 9–12
- Enrollment: 805 (2024–25)
- Student to teacher ratio: 16.84
- Language: English
- Campus: Suburban
- Colors: Blue, gold
- Athletics conference: Metro Athletic Conference
- Mascot: Blue Devils
- Rivals: Barberton High School; Green High School
- Communities served: Tallmadge
- Website: www.tallmadgeschools.org/tallmadgehighschool_home.aspx

Tallmadge High School is a public high school in Tallmadge, Ohio, United States. It is the only high school in the Tallmadge City School District. THS was established in 1879 and the current facility opened in 2008. The school colors are blue, and gold and the athletic teams are known as the Blue Devils. Tallmadge competes athletically in the Metro Athletic Conference.

The high school is part of the Six District Educational Compact, a joint program of six area school districts (Cuyahoga Falls, Hudson, Kent, Stow-Munroe Falls, Tallmadge, and Woodridge) to share access to each of their vocational training facilities and career resources.

== State championships ==
- Baseball – 2002, 2017
- Softball – 1981, 1987, 1988, 1989, 1993, 1997, 1998, 2023
- Wheelchair basketball - 2024, 2025, 2026

== Notable alumni ==
- Collin Dixon – college football wide receiver for the Illinois Fighting Illini
- Phillip Glasser - professional baseball player in Major League Baseball (MLB)
- Bill Underwood - professional baseball player in MLB
