= Hillsdale High School (Ohio) =

Location
- 479 Township Road 1902; Jeromesville, Ohio 44840; United States; 40°46′50″N 82°13′9″W

Information
- Established: 1964
- School district: Hillsdale Local School District
- Principal: Tim Keib
- Teaching staff: 18.20 (FTE)
- Grades: 9–12
- Student to teacher ratio: 18.90
- Campus type: Rural
- Colors: Blue and gold
- Athletics conference: Wayne County Athletic League
- Mascot: Falcon
- Team name: Falcons
- Rival: Loudonville Redbirds
- Yearbook: Echo
- Website: 7-12.hillsdale.k12.oh.us

Hillsdale High School is a public high school near Jeromesville, Ohio, United States. The building is located in Mohican Township between the villages of Jeromesville and Hayesville. Athletic teams are known as the Falcons, and the school colors are Columbia Blue, Navy Blue, and gold. The school opened in the fall of 1964.

== History ==
The idea for Hillsdale High School was born in 1961 when Jeromesville and Hayesville decided to merge their school districts. Joyce Justice's suggestion for the name "Hillsdale" was selected as the winner of the contest to name the school. A committee made up of representatives from both districts agreed on the school colors of Columbia Blue and Gold, and the nickname the "Falcons". The school eventually opened in the fall of 1964. The first senior class graduated in 1965.

Hillsdale was a member of the Firelands Conference until 1970, when they were asked to replace Triway High School in the Wayne County Athletic League (WCAL), despite not being located in Wayne County. Hillsdale recorded the first WCAL football championship for a non-Wayne County school in 2010 when they won the league title outright.

== State championships ==
- Girls Softball - 1979, 1994, 1996, 1999, 2000, 2010, 2018

== Notable alumni ==
- Ryan Bee, NFL player
