= Jeromesville, Ohio =

- Village
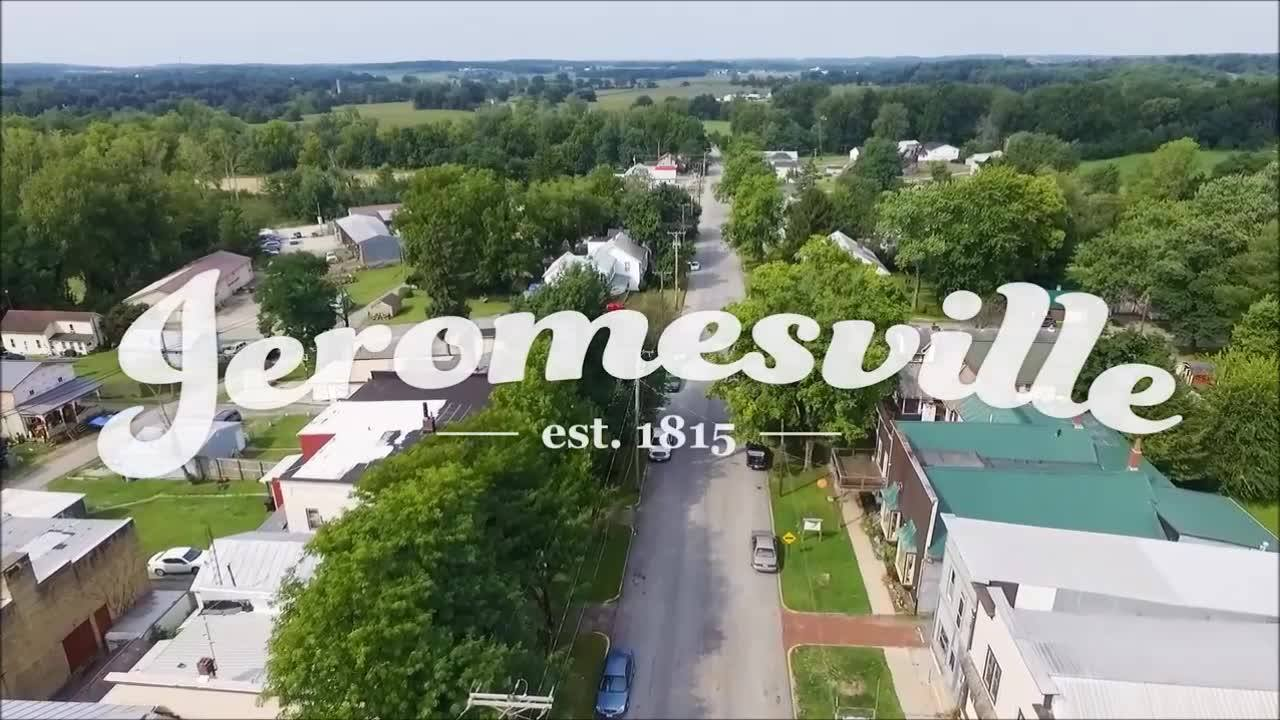
- The Village of Jeromesville

- Logo

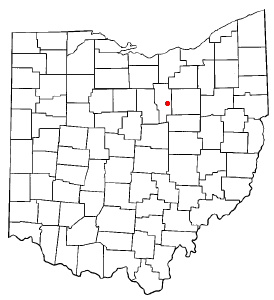
- Location of Jeromesville, Ohio

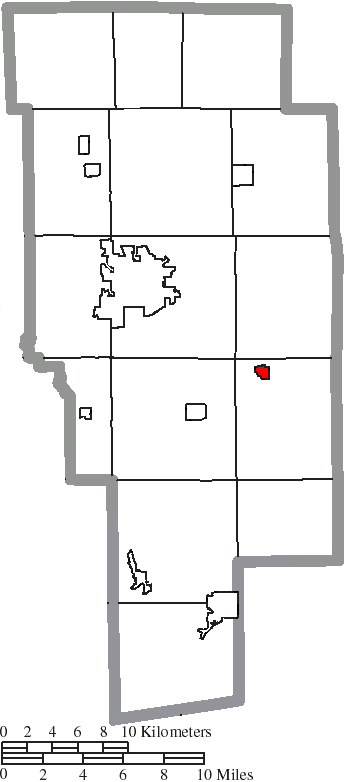
- Location of Jeromesville in Ashland County
- Coordinates: 40°48′14″N 82°11′47″W
- Country: United States
- State: Ohio
- County: Ashland
- Township: Mohican
- Incorporated: February 14, 1815

Area
  - Total: 0.35 sq mi (0.90 km^{2})
  - Land: 0.34 sq mi (0.89 km^{2})
  - Water: 0 sq mi (0.00 km^{2})
- Elevation: 997 ft (304 m)

Population (2020)
  - Total: 531
  - Density: 1,538.6/sq mi (594.04/km^{2})
- Time zone: UTC-5 (Eastern (EST))
  - Summer (DST): UTC-4 (EDT)
- ZIP code: 44840
- Area code: 419
- FIPS code: 39-39060
- GNIS feature ID: 2398299
- Website: jeromesville.nationbuilder.com

Jeromesville is a village in Mohican Township, Ashland County, Ohio, United States. The population was 531 at the 2020 census.

== History ==
Jeromesville was platted in 1815 ( near the site of a former and abandoned Native-American village named "Jerometown"). It is named for Jean/John Baptiste Jerome, (a French-Canadian fur trader and pioneer settler), from whom, Christian Deardorf and William Vaughn purchased land and 'founded' a new pioneer village, (which was originally spelled "Jeromeville"). A post office has been in operation at Jeromesville since 1816. [Note: the Native-American village of Jerometown is often attributed to be the same as "Mohican Johnstown"; however, the mid-1700s village named "Mohican Johnstown" was not at this same location.(see Lenape settlements)]

In 2018, Mayor Randy Spade founded the Jeromesville Junior Council, an advisory group consisting of 5th through 8th graders attending Hillsdale Local School District.

This is the first Junior Village Council codified into law in the State of Ohio.

== Geography ==
According to the United States Census Bureau, the village has a total area of 0.36 square miles (0.93 km^{2}), all land.

== Demographics ==
Historical population
Census	Pop.	Note	%±
1870	328		—
1880	314		−4.3%
1890	301		−4.1%
1900	308		2.3%
1910	314		1.9%
1920	408		29.9%
1930	403		−1.2%
1940	474		17.6%
1950	513		8.2%
1960	540		5.3%
1970	559		3.5%
1980	582		4.1%
1990	582		0.0%
2000	478		−17.9%
2010	562		17.6%
2020	531		−5.5%
U.S. Decennial Census

=== 2020 census ===
ACS 1-year estimates are not available for 2020. ACS Experimental Data for 2020 will be available by November 30, 2021. As of the census of 2020, there were 531 people living in the village. There were 232 housing units.

=== 2010 census ===
As of the census of 2010, there were 562 people, 208 households, and 154 families living in the village. The population density was 1,561.1 inhabitants per square mile (602.7/km^{2}). There were 234 housing units at an average density of 650.0 per square mile (251.0/km^{2}). The racial makeup of the village was 99.1% White and 0.9% Native American. Hispanic or Latino of any race were 1.1% of the population.

There were 208 households, of which 41.3% had children under the age of 18 living with them, 51.9% were married couples living together, 17.3% had a female householder with no husband present, 4.8% had a male householder with no wife present, and 26.0% were non-families. 21.6% of all households were made up of individuals, and 7.2% had someone living alone who was 65 years of age or older. The average household size was 2.70 and the average family size was 3.14.

The median age in the village was 33.3 years. 32.4% of residents were under the age of 18; 5.9% were between the ages of 18 and 24; 26.7% were from 25 to 44; 24.3% were from 45 to 64; and 10.7% were 65 years of age or older. The gender makeup of the village was 49.6% male and 50.4% female.

=== 2000 census ===
As of the census of 2000, there were 478 people, 202 households, and 128 families living in the village. The population density was 1,309.6 inhabitants per square mile (505.6/km^{2}). There were 210 housing units at an average density of 575.4 per square mile (222.2/km^{2}). The racial makeup of the village was 96.86% White, 0.42% African American, 1.26% Native American, and 1.46% from two or more races. Hispanic or Latino of any race were 2.30% of the population.

There were 202 households, out of which 30.7% had children under the age of 18 living with them, 51.0% were married couples living together, 10.4% had a female householder with no husband present, and 36.6% were non-families. 30.2% of all households were made up of individuals, and 12.9% had someone living alone who was 65 years of age or older. The average household size was 2.37 and the average family size was 2.96.

In the village, the population was spread out, with 26.4% under the age of 18, 6.1% from 18 to 24, 31.8% from 25 to 44, 22.4% from 45 to 64, and 13.4% who were 65 years of age or older. The median age was 37 years. For every 100 females there were 92.0 males. For every 100 females age 18 and over, there were 88.2 males.

The median income for a household in the village was $41,000, and the median income for a family was $46,250. Males had a median income of $31,576 versus $21,667 for females. The per capita income for the village was $16,864. About 2.3% of families and 6.1% of the population were below the poverty line, including 7.4% of those under age 18 and 3.8% of those age 65 or over.

== Education ==
Jeromesville Public Schools belong to the Hillsdale Local School District. The district has one elementary school, one middle school, and one high school. Students attend Hillsdale High School.
