= Mount Gilead High School =

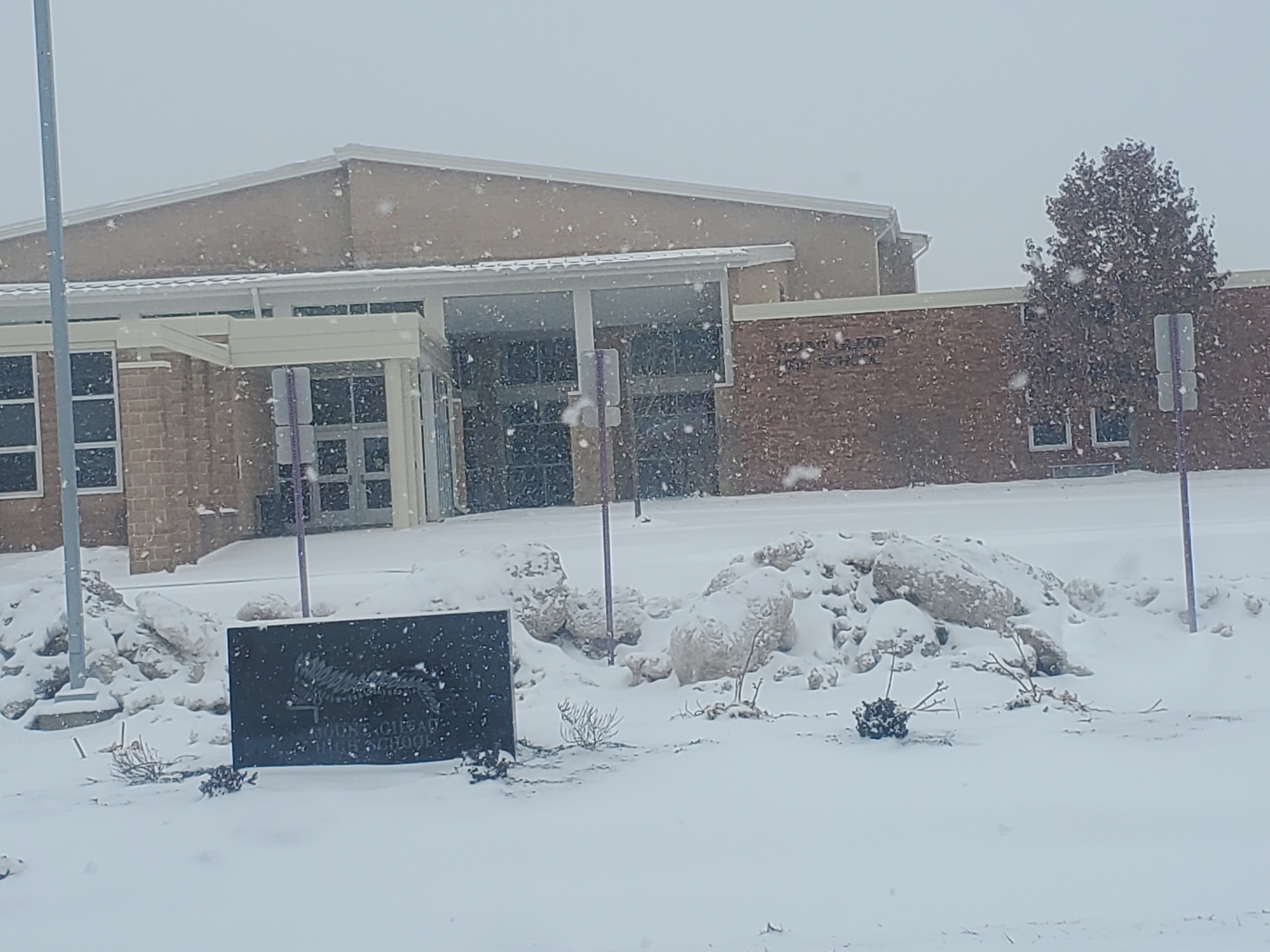
- Mount Gilead High School in 2022

Location
- 338 W Park Ave; Mount Gilead, (Morrow County), Ohio 43338; United States; 40°33′21″N 82°49′53″W

Information
- Type: Public, Coeducational high school
- School district: Mount Gilead Exempted Village Schools
- Superintendent: Zack Howard
- Principal: Robert McQuate
- Grades: 9-12
- Colors: Purple & White
- Athletics conference: Knox Morrow Athletic Conference (KMAC)
- Team name: Indians
- Rival: Cardington-Lincoln High School
- Athletic Director: Jack Bault
- Website: School website

Mount Gilead High School is a public high school in Mount Gilead, Ohio. It is the only high school in the Mount Gilead Exempted Village Schools District. Their nickname is the Indians, and they compete in the Knox Morrow Athletic Conference.

== Athletics ==
====== State championships ======
- Boys golf – 1985
- Boys cross country – 2022, 2024, 2026
