= Champion High School =

Public high school in Ohio, United States

Coordinates: 41.316°N 80.852°W

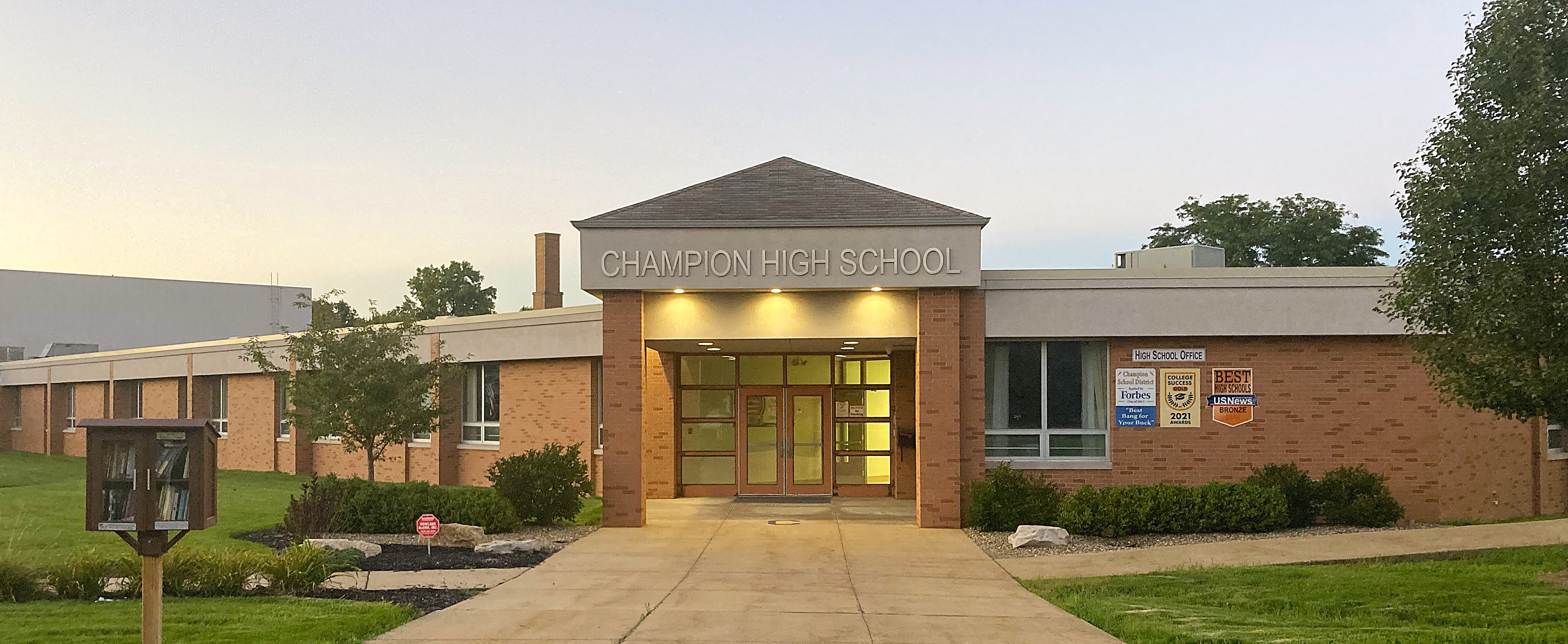

Location
- 5976 Mahoning Avenue NW; Warren, Ohio 44483; United States

Information
- Type: Public, Coeducational high school
- Established: 1915
- School district: Champion Local School District
- NCES School ID: 390501303844
- Principal: Tracy Herrholtz
- Teaching staff: 23.00 (FTE)
- Grades: 9–12
- Enrollment: 328 (2024–25)
- Student to teacher ratio: 14.26
- Colors: Purple & gold
- Athletics conference: Mahoning Valley Athletic Conference
- Team name: Flashes
- Website: www.championlocal.org

Champion High School is a public high school in Champion Township, Ohio, United States, near Warren. It is the only high school in the Champion Local School District. Their nickname is the Flashes, and they compete in the Mahoning Valley Athletic Conference as a member of the Ohio High School Athletic Association.

== History ==
In the 1910s, voters in Champion Township approved a $6,500 bond to construct Champion High School, which was built in 1915. The old campus was used until 1957, when Champion built its current high school campus. The old campus was later occupied by Champion Central High School until its demolition in 2018.

As enrollment grew in the 70s, additions were added to the high school, including new classrooms and a new band room as well as a 1,040-seat auditorium. More renovations took place in the 90s, with five new classrooms, a computer lab, administration office area, a front entrance with new parking, and additional restrooms. Champion renovated other classrooms as well. Following the new additions, part of the southeast wing of the school was demolished.

== Athletics ==
=== State championships ===
- Softball – 1978, 1980, 1994, 2011, 2012, 2015, 2017, 2018, 2019
- Baseball – 2017
- Boys bowling – 2014

== Notable alumni ==
- Randy Gradishar - former professional football player in the National Football League (NFL)
