= Northampton Township, Summit County, Ohio =

Northampton
- Former township
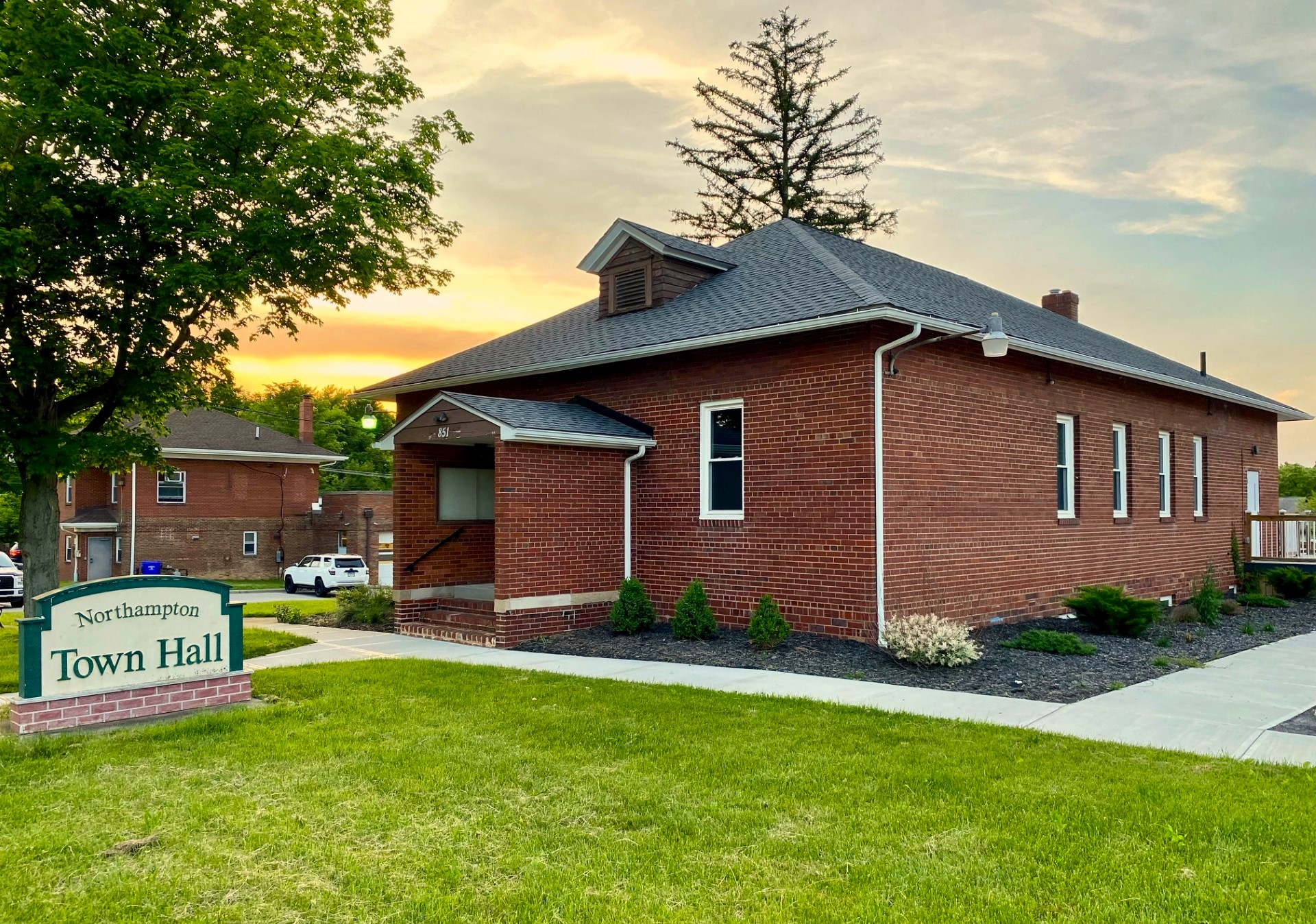

- Location within the state of Ohio
- Coordinates: 41°9′59″N 81°32′12″W
- Country: United States
- State: Ohio
- County: Summit
- Time zone: UTC-5 (Eastern (EST))
  - Summer (DST): UTC-4 (EDT)

Northampton was one of the 16 original townships in Summit County, Ohio. It was situated in the middle of Summit County, bordering Akron and Cuyahoga Falls. No incorporated areas were formed within the township, but Akron and Cuyahoga Falls expanded into Northampton via annexation. In 1986, Northampton Township merged with Cuyahoga Falls, making the first time a township and city had merged in Ohio. When created, it occupied survey Town 3, Range 11 in the Western Reserve and covered an area of about 25 square miles (65 km^{2}). Its first settler, Simeon Prior, named the township for the Hampshire County, Massachusetts village of Northampton.

== Geography ==
Northampton was originally bounded by Portage Township to the south, Bath Township to the west, Boston Township to the north and Stow Township to the east. At the time of its merger with Cuyahoga Falls, it was bordered by Akron to the south, the city of Stow to the east, and Cuyahoga Falls to the southeast.

== History ==
The Ottawa and Mingo tribes hunted in Northampton before Europeans arrived. The first white settler in Northampton was Simeon Prior, who moved there with his wife and ten children from Northampton, Massachusetts in 1802. Native Americans still lived in the township and remained there until 1812 when American forces began to assemble there for the War of 1812. Northampton provided a rendezvous point for militia during the war and the two or three vessels of Oliver Hazard Perry's fleet were built in the township and floated down the Cuyahoga River to Lake Erie.

In 1986, Northampton merged with Cuyahoga Falls. Both Akron and Cuyahoga Falls had been annexing the southern part of the township. Also, a major portion of the township had been purchased by the Cuyahoga Valley National Recreation Area (now the Cuyahoga Valley National Park), reducing the tax base. The residents of Northampton chose to join with Cuyahoga Falls so that their future would be settled. The township became Ward 8 in Cuyahoga Falls and kept special zoning to preserve some of its rural nature.

Annexation of parts of Northampton by Akron had left an irregular border between the two communities, including several islands inside Akron. Akron and Cuyahoga Falls tried to work out a land swap to smooth out the borders. They came up with a plan but it was never approved. The two cities have a joint fire station, though, that covers part of both communities.

=== Counties ===
Northampton Township's land has been in the following counties

- 1788 – Washington
- 1797 – Jefferson
- 1800 – Trumbull
- 1808 – Portage
- 1840 – Summit

== Transportation ==
Northampton was served by Route 8, which originally went up Akron-Cleveland Road (now State Road). With Route 8 being moved to a divided highway to the east, the area is no longer served by any state highways.

== Schools ==
The area of Northampton is mostly served by the Woodridge Local School District, with parts also served by the Revere Local School District. It is also served by the Cuyahoga Valley Joint Vocational School District.

== Hamlets ==
- Botzum (Niles)
- East Steels Corners
- French's Mill (Doyle, 1908)
- Iron Bridge
- McArthur's Corners (Doyle, 1908)
- Northampton Center
- Old Portage
- West Steels Corners
