= Loudonville High School =

Location
- 421 Campus Avenue; Loudonville, Ohio 44842; United States
- Coordinates: 40°38′19″N 82°14′35″W

Information
- Type: Public high school
- School district: Loudonville-Perrysville Exempted Village School District
- NCES School ID: 390454602225
- Principal: Chrissie Butts
- Teaching staff: 25.50 (on an FTE basis)
- Grades: 7–12
- Enrollment: 373 (2024-2025)
- Student to teacher ratio: 12.51
- Colors: Red and Gray
- Athletics conference: Knox Morrow Athletic Conference
- Mascot: Tuffy the Redbird
- Nickname: Redbirds
- Accreditation: North Central Association of Colleges and Schools
- Website: www.lpschools.k12.oh.us/o/hs

Loudonville High School (LHS) is a public high school in Loudonville, Ohio, United States. It is part of the Loudonville-Perrysville Exempted Village School District.

The campus-style school was constructed in 1964. During its planning stages, there was a proposal to name the new building after Hugo H. Young, a prominent local figure and founder of the Flxible Company. Young was known for his significant contributions to the community, including establishing the Hugo H. and Mabel B. Young Foundation in 1963 to support charitable organizations in Ashland and Holmes Counties.

== State championships ==
- Girls softball - 1993, 1997, 2002
- Girls volleyball – 1991
