= Tallmadge, Ohio =

- City
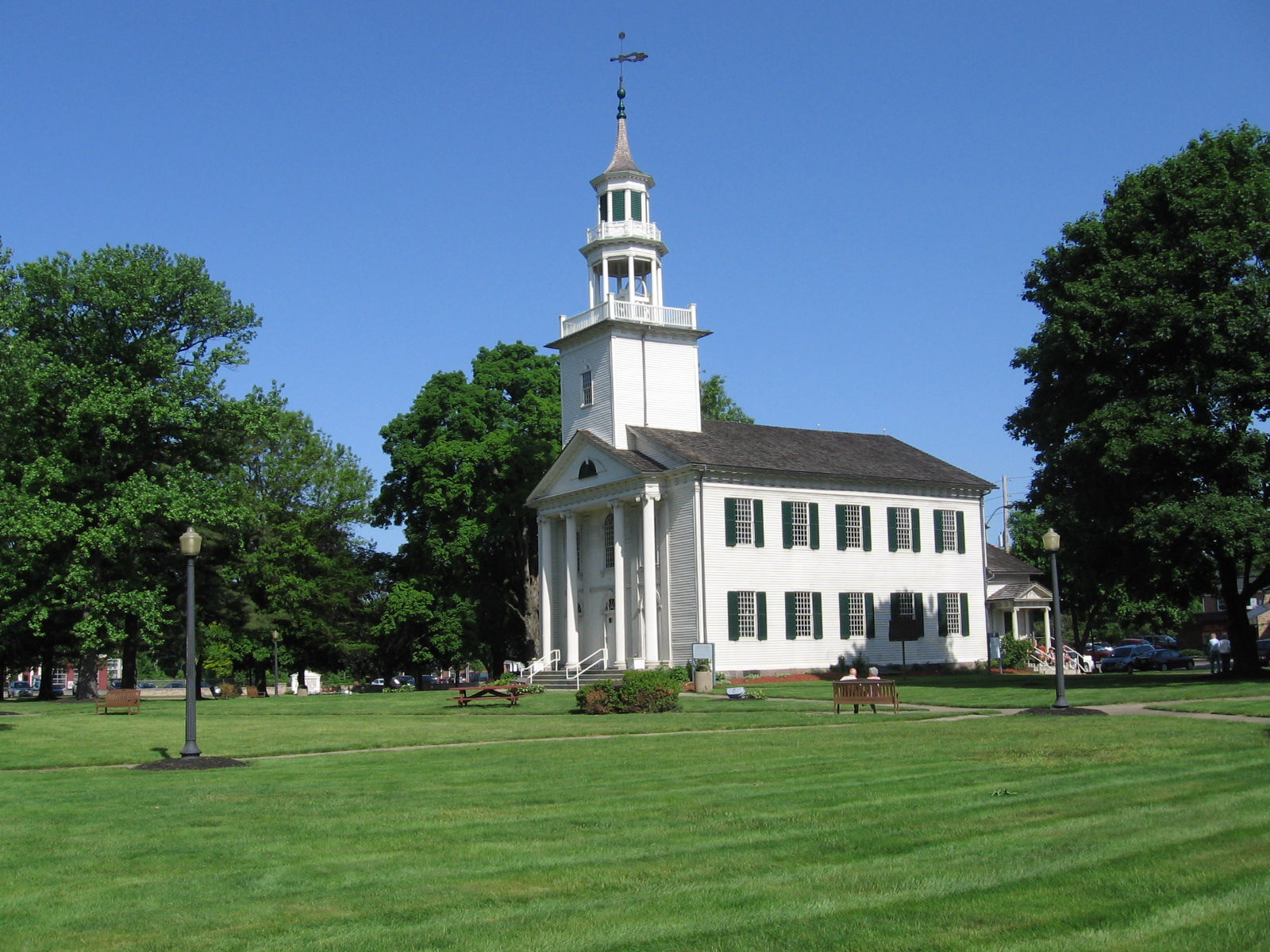
- Tallmadge Town Square Historic District
- Motto: "History Moving Forward"
- Interactive map of Tallmadge, Ohio
- Location within Ohio Location within the United States
- Coordinates: 41°06′49″N 81°25′10″W
- Country: United States
- State: Ohio
- Counties: Summit, Portage
- Founded: 1807
- Incorporated: 1936

Area
  - Total: 14.06 sq mi (36.42 km^{2})
  - Land: 14.04 sq mi (36.36 km^{2})
  - Water: 0.019 sq mi (0.05 km^{2})
- Elevation: 1,194 ft (364 m)

Population (2020)
  - Total: 18,394
  - Density: 1,310.1/sq mi (505.83/km^{2})
- Time zone: UTC-5 (Eastern (EST))
  - Summer (DST): UTC-4 (EDT)
- ZIP code: 44278
- Area code: 330
- FIPS code: 39-76106
- GNIS feature ID: 1087019
- Website: https://www.tallmadgeoh.gov/

Tallmadge (/ˈtælmɪdʒ/ TAL-mij) is a city in eastern Summit County, Ohio, United States, with a small district in neighboring Portage County. It is a suburb of Akron and part of the Akron metropolitan area. The population was 18,394 at the 2020 census. Tallmadge was founded in 1807 and is the second-oldest city in Summit County, following Hudson, which was founded in 1799.

== History ==
Historically, Tallmadge was a part of the Connecticut Western Reserve, which was a three million acre plot of land in northeast Ohio. Prior to being named Tallmadge, it was part of Town 2, Range 10 in the Western Reserve. In 1807, the Reverend David Bacon founded and organized Tallmadge, placing a square road in the center of town where several other roads met, modeled after New England designs of the time period. The town was named after Benjamin Tallmadge, an American Revolutionary War figure and local landowner. In the nineteenth century, Tallmadge continued to develop around the square as its centerpiece, which years later became a traffic circle named "Tallmadge Circle" (or simply "the Circle"). The Circle as it is today represents New England's role in the settlement of the Ohio Western Reserve. The rest of the city was designed in a grid pattern, with industry tending to develop near the railroad.

No alcohol could be bought or consumed in public in Tallmadge until the early 1990s, when the law was amended to allow the retail sale of alcohol in stores, but public consumption was still illegal. In 2001, the law was repealed and alcohol could be sold and consumed in restaurants, provided that alcohol not account for more than 30% of any establishment's revenue. The first restaurant to offer alcohol in Tallmadge was Delanie's on West Avenue.

Tallmadge lies within two counties. While the vast majority of the city lies in Summit County, portions on the east side protrude into neighboring Portage County. This phenomenon resulted from the annexation of small portions of a neighboring township, Brimfield.

== Geography ==
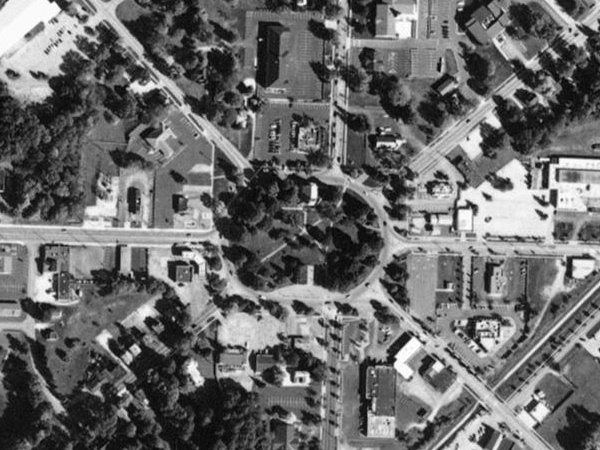
Aerial photo of the Tallmadge Circle, a traffic circle located in the center of Tallmadge

According to the United States Census Bureau, the city has a total area of 14.02 square miles (36.31 km^{2}), of which, 14.00 square miles (36.26 km^{2}) is land and 0.02 square miles (0.05 km^{2}) is water.

== Demographics ==
Historical population
Census	Pop.	Note	%±
1880	376		—
1940	3,452		—
1950	5,821		68.6%
1960	10,246		76.0%
1970	15,274		49.1%
1980	15,238		−0.2%
1990	14,870		−2.4%
2000	16,390		10.2%
2010	17,537		7.0%
2020	18,394		4.9%
2025 (est.)	18,521		0.7%
U.S. Decennial Census

=== 2020 census ===
As of the 2020 census, Tallmadge had a population of 18,394. The median age was 45.8 years. 20.1% of residents were under the age of 18 and 23.4% of residents were 65 years of age or older. For every 100 females there were 93.6 males, and for every 100 females age 18 and over there were 90.9 males age 18 and over.

99.8% of residents lived in urban areas, while 0.2% lived in rural areas.

There were 7,601 households in Tallmadge, of which 26.4% had children under the age of 18 living in them. Of all households, 52.1% were married-couple households, 16.2% were households with a male householder and no spouse or partner present, and 26.1% were households with a female householder and no spouse or partner present. About 28.6% of all households were made up of individuals and 14.7% had someone living alone who was 65 years of age or older.

There were 7,886 housing units, of which 3.6% were vacant. The homeowner vacancy rate was 0.9% and the rental vacancy rate was 3.7%.

Racial composition as of the 2020 census
Race	Number	Percent
White	15,942	86.7%
Black or African American	852	4.6%
American Indian and Alaska Native	17	0.1%
Asian	539	2.9%
Native Hawaiian and Other Pacific Islander	4	0.0%
Some other race	94	0.5%
Two or more races	946	5.1%
Hispanic or Latino (of any race)	294	1.6%

=== 2010 census ===
As of the census of 2010, there were 17,537 people, 7,026 households, and 4,932 families residing in the city. The population density was 1,252.6 inhabitants per square mile (483.6/km^{2}). There were 7,413 housing units at an average density of 529.5 units per square mile (204.4 units/km^{2}). The racial makeup of the city was 93.6% White, 3.3% African American, 0.3% Native American, 1.0% Asian, 0.1% Pacific Islander, 0.3% from other races, and 1.5% from two or more races. Hispanic or Latino of any race were 1.0% of the population.

There were 7,026 households, of which 28.7% had children under age 18 living with them, 55.5% were married couples living together, 10.7% had a female householder with no husband present, 4.0% had a male householder with no wife present, and 29.8% were non-families. 25.5% of all households were made up of individuals, and 11.7% had someone living alone who was 65 years of age or older. The average household size was 2.45 and the average family size was 2.94.

The median age in the city was 45.1 years. 21.6% of residents were under the age of 18; 7.4% were between the ages of 18 and 24; 20.7% were from 25 to 44; 30.7% were from 45 to 64; and 19.5% were 65 years of age or older. The gender makeup of the city was 47.8% male and 52.2% female.

=== 2000 census ===
As of the census of 2000, there were 16,390 people, 6,273 households, and 4,711 families residing in the city. The population density was 1,173.9 inhabitants per square mile (453.2/km^{2}). There were 6,494 housing units at an average density of 465.1 units per square mile (179.6 units/km^{2}). The racial makeup of the city was 95.78% White, 2.08% African American, 0.12% Native American, 0.87% Asian, 0.03% Pacific Islander, 0.08% from other races, and 1.05% from two or more races. Hispanic or Latino of any race were 0.57% of the population.

There were 6,273 households, of which 32.0% had children under age 18 living with them, 63.0% were married couples living together, 8.9% had a female householder with no husband present, and 24.9% were non-families. 21.3% of all households were made up of individuals, and 10.4% had someone living alone who was 65 years of age or older. The average household size was 2.56 and the average family size was 2.99.

In the city, the population was spread out, with 24.0% under the age of 18, 6.6% from 18 to 24, 26.0% from 25 to 44, 25.4% from 45 to 64, and 18.0% who were 65 years of age or older. The median age was 41 years. For every 100 females, there were 93.1 males. For every 100 females age 18 and over, there were 88.2 males.

The median income for a household in the city was $49,381, and the median income for a family was $56,780. Males had a median income of $44,606 versus $28,056 for females. The per capita income for the city was $27,329. About 4.0% of families and 4.7% of the population were below the poverty line, including 5.9% of those under age 18 and 3.4% of those age 65 or over.

== Education ==
The Tallmadge City School District provides primary and secondary education for 2,700 students in Tallmadge. A very small portion of the city is part of the neighboring Stow-Munroe Falls City School District. Students in the Tallmadge City School District attend Tallmadge Elementary for grades K–5, Tallmadge Middle School for grades 6–8, and Tallmadge High School for grades 9–12. Cornerstone Community School is a Christian Pre-K - 6th elementary school in Tallmadge and is housed in the former Overdale Primary School building.

Tallmadge currently has no colleges or universities, but Western Reserve University began its first classes in Tallmadge in 1826 before moving to nearby Hudson and its current home in Cleveland as part of Case Western Reserve University.

Tallmadge has a public library, a branch of the Akron-Summit County Public Library.

== Sports ==
Tallmadge Little League Baseball teams have represented the city in the 1974 and 2003 Little League World Series. The 1974 team advanced to the semi-final round, finishing in fourth place. The Tallmadge High School Blue Devils have won 10 state championships, with eight in softball and two in baseball. The THS softball team has won state titles in 1981, 1987, 1988, 1989, 1993, 1997, 1998, and 2023 and the baseball team has won state titles in 2002 and 2017.

== Landmarks ==
At the center of the town is the Historic Tallmadge Church (built in 1825), recognized as a historic place by the Ohio Historical Society, and was featured on the cover of the November 20, 1944, edition of Life magazine. An intersection surrounds the church and a small park, the Tallmadge Circle Park, on which the church sits. The Circle Park is also home to Tallmadge's Old Town Hall (established 1859), which houses a museum on its second floor. In 2003, a new steeple was placed atop the Old Town Hall, replacing the original which had been removed decades earlier.

The Circle itself, which surrounds the Historic Church, Old Town Hall, and Circle Park, continues to be a notable landmark at the center of the town. While two separate Ohio state routes meet at the intersection (SR 91 and SR 261; at one point SR 18 and SR 532 also met there), the one-lane circle regularly accommodates several dozen vehicles at a time without congestion, although jams are present on roads leading to the circle itself at peak hours. The eight roads that meet at the Circle form a spoke design that, as they lead away from the Circle, travel in the cardinal and ordinal directions. The roads are named according to the respective directions they travel away from the Circle (such as Northwest Avenue); these names are not preserved by the neighboring municipalities into which the eight roads run. Four of these eight roads comes to a six-point intersection within the original city, forming a square. In summer 2010, one of these six-point intersections in the northeastern portion of Tallmadge was converted to a roundabout based on the design of the original Circle.

== Photos ==
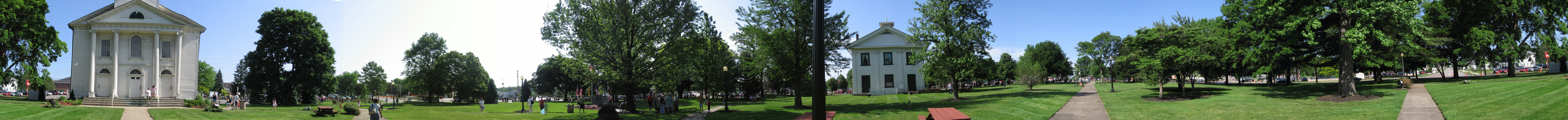
Tallmadge Circle Park panorama, May 2007

== Notable people ==
- Mike Bettes, meteorologist for The Weather Channel
- Delia Bacon, American writer
- Clara Driscoll, head of the Tiffany Studios Women's Glass Cutting Department (the "Tiffany Girls"), in New York City.
- Collin Dixon, college football player
- Sidney Edgerton, Governor of the Montana Territory
- John Parry, National Football League referee
- Dave Ziegler, American football assistant general manager of the Tennessee Titans
