= Bloom-Carroll High School =

High School

Location
- 5240 Plum Road; Carroll, Ohio, (Fairfield County) 43112; United States
- 39°47′46″N 82°41′59″W

Information
- Type: Public, Coeducational high school
- Superintendent: Shawn Haughn
- President: Jen Sherman
- Principal: Nathan Conrad
- Teaching staff: 30.14 (FTE)
- Grades: 9-12
- Student to teacher ratio: 22.53
- Colors: Purple and gold
- Athletics conference: Mid-State League
- Mascot: Bulldog
- Team name: Bulldogs
- Rival: Liberty Union/ Canal Winchester
- Website: www.bloom-carroll.k12.oh.us/highschool_home.aspx

Bloom-Carroll High School is a public high school located in Carroll, Ohio. It is the only high school in the Bloom-Carroll School district. Athletic teams are known as the Bulldogs.

== Athletics ==
=== State championships ===
- Softball – 2006, 2007, 2013, 2026
- Baseball – 2014

== Eastland-Fairfield Career & Technical School ==
School	Location	Satellite Locations	School Districts	Grades
Eastland-Fairfield Career & Technical Schools	Eastland: Groveport, Ohio Fairfield: Carrol, Ohio	Lincoln High School; Groveport Madison High School; New Albany High School; Pickerington High School North; Reynoldsburg High School; Canal Winchester High School	16 School Districts	11–12
