= East Knox High School =

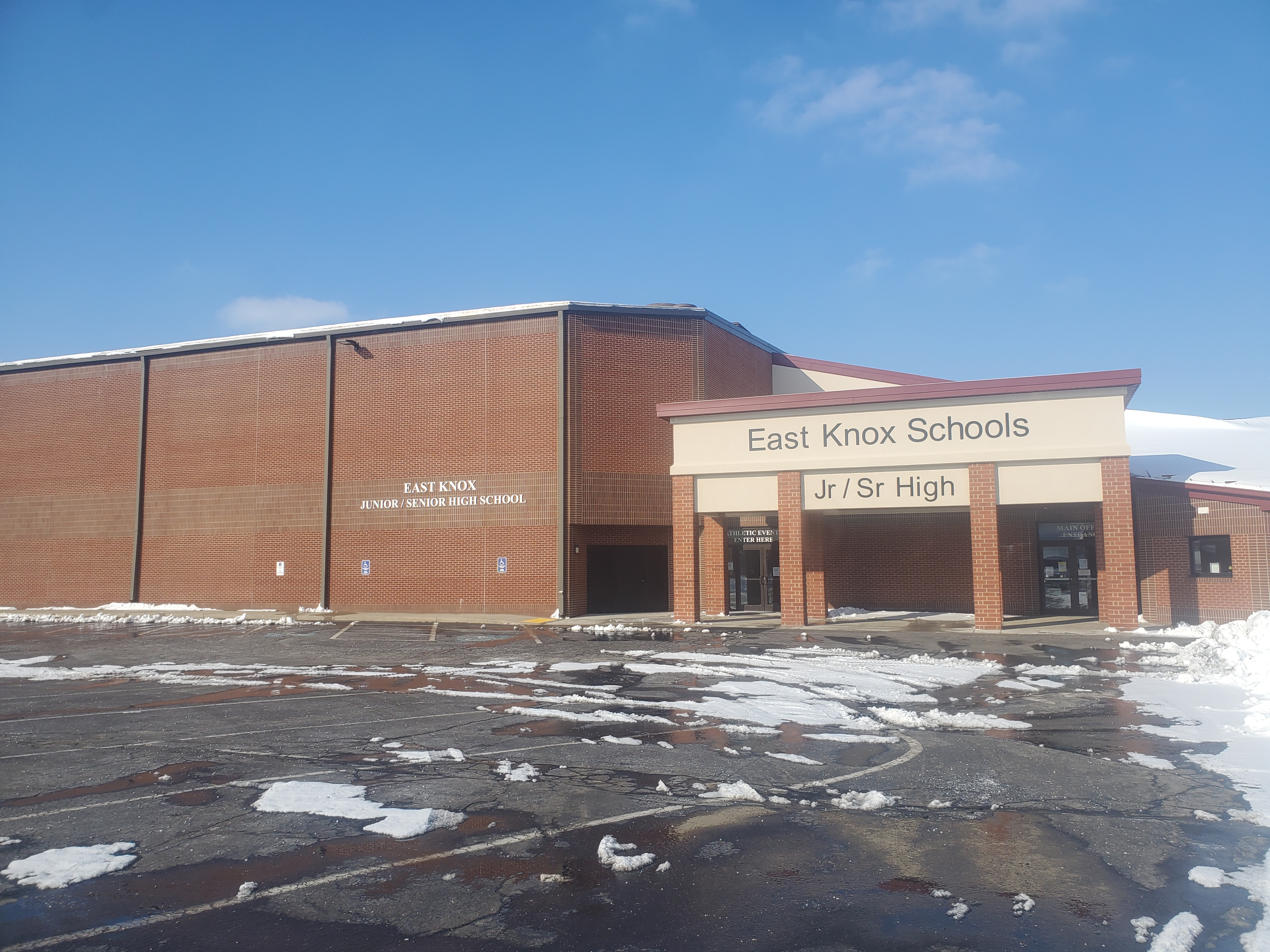
- East Knox High School in 2022

Location
- 23227 Coshocton Road; Howard, Ohio 43028; United States
- Coordinates: 40°24′32″N 82°19′47″W

Information
- Other name: EKHS
- Type: Public high school
- School district: East Knox Local Schools
- NCES School ID: 391001303010
- Principal: Shannon Sprang
- Teaching staff: 26.37 (on an FTE basis)
- Grades: 7–12
- Enrollment: 369 (2024-2025)
- Student to teacher ratio: 13.99
- Colors: Purple and White
- Athletics conference: Knox Morrow Athletic Conference
- Mascot: Bulldog
- Nickname: Bulldogs
- Website: www.ekschools.org/jrsr-high-school

East Knox High School (EKHS) is a public high school in Howard, Ohio, United States. It is part of the East Knox Local Schools district.

== Incidents ==
Denial of graduation:

In May of 2026, an East Knox High School senior was denied from participating in the graduation ceremony after missing a mandatory rehearsal. The student stated that the absence was caused by a brake failure on his vehicle during his commute to school. East Knox Local Schools Superintendent Richard Baird declined to comment on the specific incident, citing state and federal student privacy laws.
