= Woodridge High School =

Public high school in Cuyahoga Falls, Ohio, United States

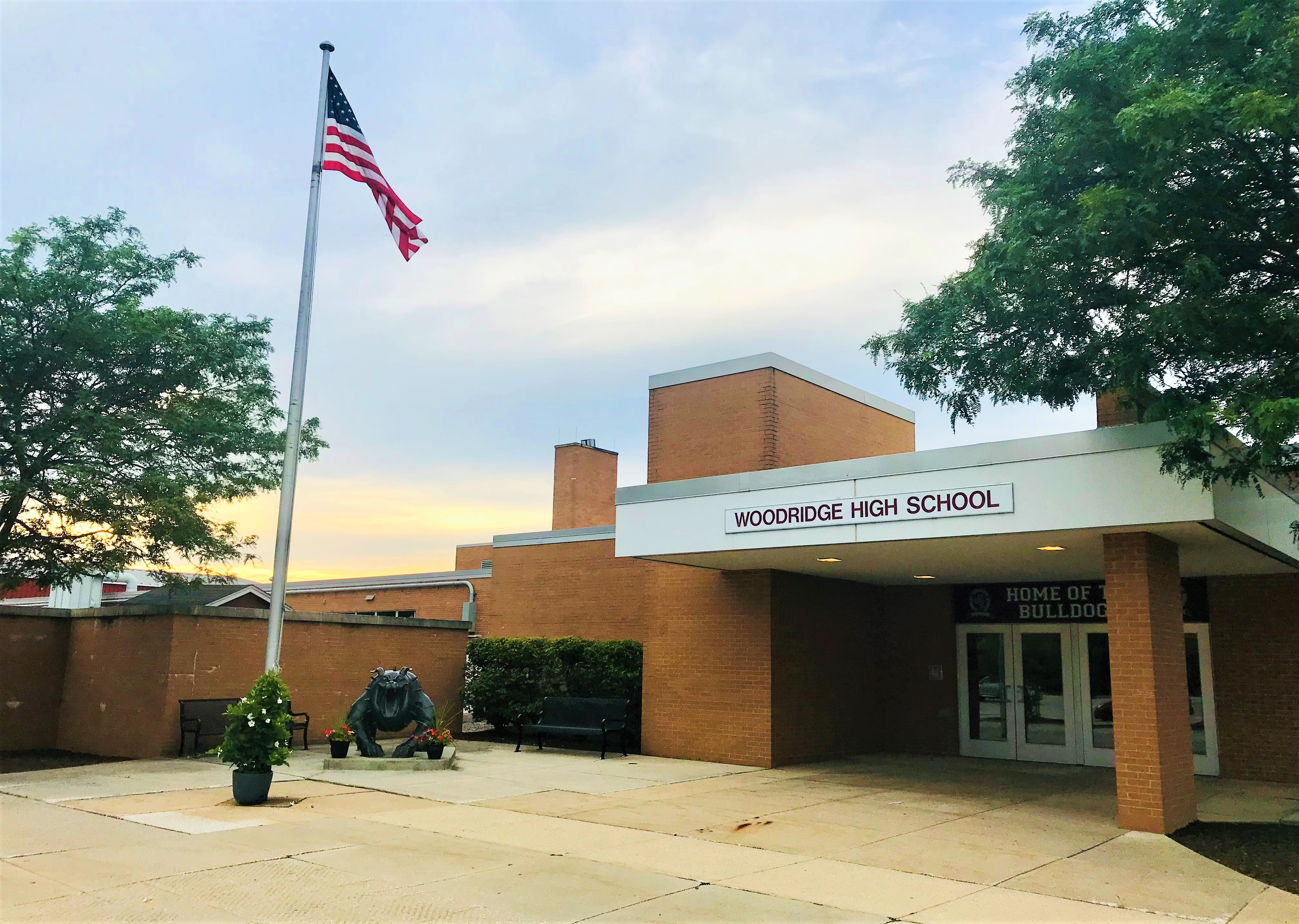

Location
- 4440 Quick Road; Peninsula, Ohio 44264; United States; 41°11′31.19″N 81°30′39.85″W

Information
- Type: Public
- Motto: Community, Scholarship, Diversity
- Established: 1962
- School district: Woodridge Local School District
- NCES School ID: 390499703780
- Principal: Albert DiTommaso
- Teaching staff: 46.00 (on an FTE basis)
- Grades: 9–12
- Enrollment: 625 (2024–25)
- Student to teacher ratio: 13.59
- Campus type: Rural fringe
- Colors: Maroon, gray, white
- Athletics conference: Metro Athletic Conference
- Team name: Bulldogs
- Website: whs.woodridge.k12.oh.us

Woodridge High School is a public high school in Cuyahoga Falls, Ohio, United States. It is the only high school in the Woodridge Local School District and serves students in grades nine through twelve. The district serves Peninsula, northern Cuyahoga Falls, most of Boston Township, part of Boston Heights, and small portions of northwest Akron and eastern Richfield Township. Athletic teams are known as the Bulldogs and the school colors are maroon, gray, and white. Woodridge competes in the Ohio High School Athletic Association (OHSAA) as a member of the Metro Athletic Conference.

The high school is also part of the Six District Educational Compact, a joint program of six area school districts (Cuyahoga Falls, Hudson, Kent, Stow-Munroe Falls, Tallmadge and Woodridge) to share access to each of their vocational training facilities and career resources.

== History ==
Woodridge High School was established January 29, 1962. It was built as a replacement for the old Boston High School in Peninsula as part of the merger agreement between the Boston Local and Northampton Local School Districts in 1958. Voters approved the bond issue for the high school in May 1959 and construction began in early 1961. Hundreds of Boston High School students petitioned the school board to retain the Boston High School name just prior to the opening of Woodridge, but the board ultimately decided to use the Woodridge name. The use of "Bulldogs" for the athletic teams is a holdover from Boston High, however.

== Activities ==
The school offers many extra- and co-curricular activities for students to participate in: marching and concert band; Latin and Spanish Club; Drama Club; Literary Club; Political Awareness Club; Interact of Rotary International; Diversity Club; etc.

== Administration ==
- Principal: Albert DiTommaso

== Athletics ==
=== State championships ===
- Boys cross country – 2006, 2007, 2008, 2009, 2010, 2012, 2016, 2018, 2019, 2020, 2025, 2026
- Girls cross country – 1995, 2016, 2023
- Boys track - 2021
- Girls track - 2023, 2024

== Notable alumni ==
- Kevin Coughlin, former Republican state senator
- Mark Mothersbaugh, of the band Devo; film score composer for The Lego Movie
- Hunter Niswander, NFL player
- Jeff Phelps, Cleveland TV & radio personality

== Athletic facilities ==
- Lahoski Field - football and soccer
- Mercer Family Track - all-weather track
- Field house
  - Includes Stammen Wrestling Room, weight room, training room, 1 classroom, 2 locker rooms, and a storage area.
- Baseball field
- Softball field
- Gymnasium
- Auxiliary gymnasium
