= Stow–Munroe Falls High School =

Public high school in Stow, Ohio, United States

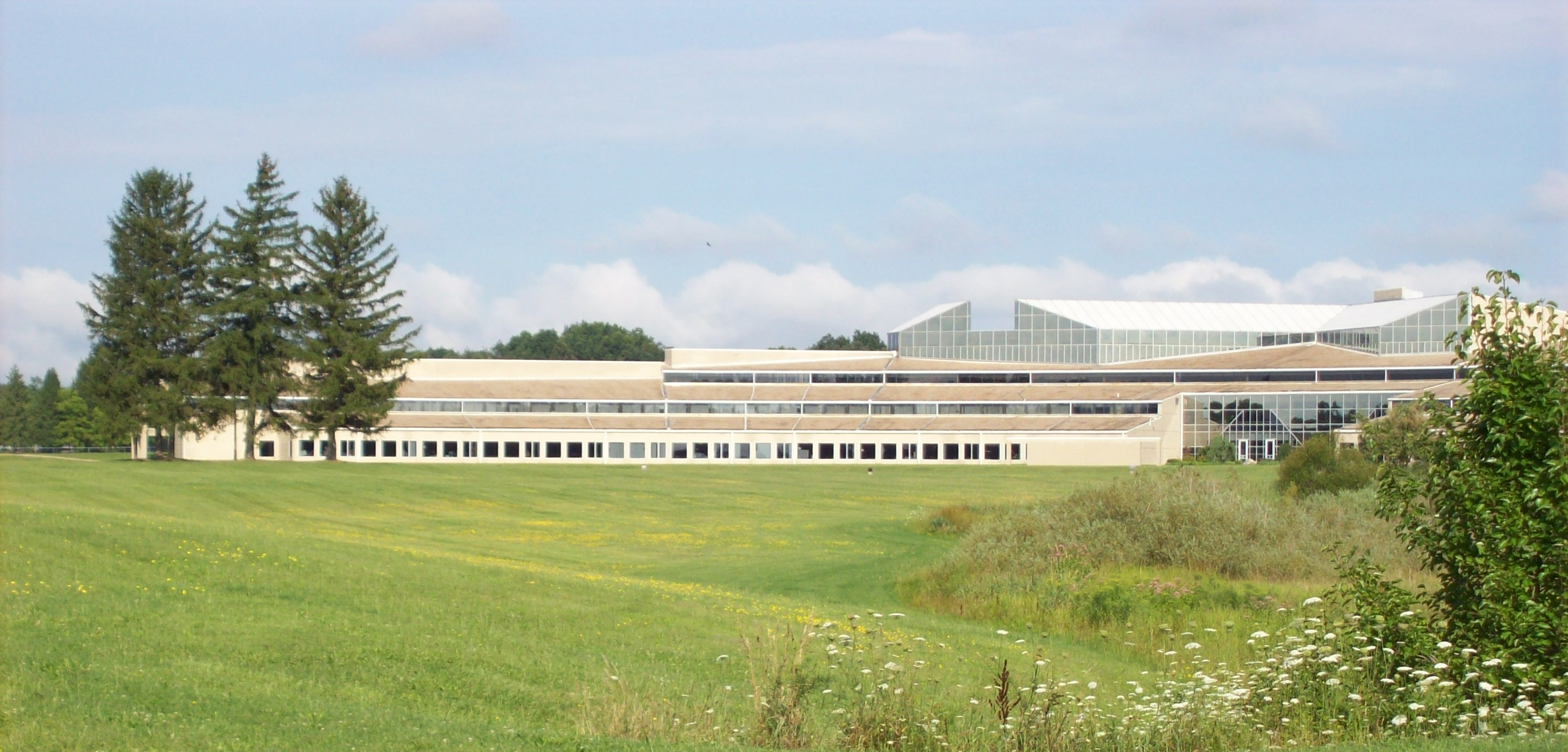

Location
- 3227 East Graham Road; Stow, Ohio 44224; United States; 41°10′6.60″N 81°23′39.61″W

Information
- Type: Public
- Established: 1987
- School district: Stow–Munroe Falls City School District
- Superintendent: Felisha Gould
- CEEB code: 364845
- Principal: Amanda Murray
- Teaching staff: 82.78 (FTE)
- Grades: 9–12
- Enrollment: 1,723 (2023–2024)
- Student to teacher ratio: 20.81
- Colors: Maroon and gold
- Athletics conference: Suburban League
- Mascot: Spike the Bulldog
- Team name: Bulldogs
- Rivals: Cuyahoga Falls Black Tigers; Hudson Explorers; Kent Roosevelt Rough Riders
- Accreditation: Ohio Department of Education
- Newspaper: Stohion
- Yearbook: Stoanno
- Website: smfhs.smfschools.org

Stow–Munroe Falls High School (SMFHS) is a public high school in Stow, Ohio, United States. In the 2024–25 school year, the school had an enrollment of approximately 1,650 students and a staff of more than 160. It is the only high school in the Stow–Munroe Falls City School District and serves students in grades nine through twelve, mostly from the cities of Stow and Munroe Falls, but also neighboring parts of Cuyahoga Falls, Franklin Township, Hudson, and Tallmadge. In recent years, academic recognition has come from the Ohio Department of Education, Newsweek, and U.S. News & World Report.

Established in 1907, Stow High School (SHS) graduated its first class in 1909. The school has operated at four different sites, all of which lie within roughly a three-mile (4.8 km) stretch along Graham Road in Stow. The first dedicated high school building opened in 1924, followed by a new facility in 1963. During most of the 1970s and 1980s, classes were held on two separate sites to relieve overcrowding. The current building was opened in 1987, and the school was officially renamed Stow–Munroe Falls High School in 1991.

Academically, SMFHS offers dozens of courses, including 16 Advanced Placement classes. Many vocational education programs are available through the Six District Educational Compact with neighboring high schools. In addition, clubs and activities are offered in a number of different areas, including the visual and performing arts, foreign languages, speech and debate, science and social causes. Athletic teams are known as the Bulldogs and the school colors are maroon and gold. SMFHS competes in the Ohio High School Athletic Association as a member of the Suburban League. Notable alumni include figures in the entertainment industry, broadcast media, and professional sports.

== History ==
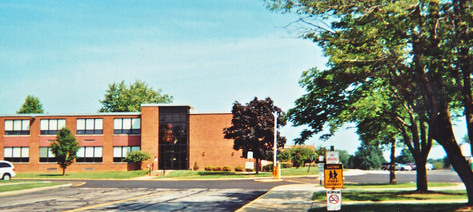
The Lakeview building in 2010, which now functions as an intermediate school

Stow High School was established in 1907 with classes held at the new centralized school building at the northwest corner of Hudson Road (later Darrow Road) and Graham Road in Stow. Early classes were much smaller than they are today; as such, the first class did not graduate until 1909, and there was no class of 1915. The school received full accreditation in 1914 and the village of Munroe Falls joined the school district in 1916. Enrollment growth necessitated construction of a separate high school building, which opened in 1924 across the street at the southwest corner of Darrow and Graham Roads. This structure was later renamed in 1968 for Velma Workman, who retired in 1967 after teaching in the Stow schools for 37 years. Continued enrollment growth in the 1950s and into the 1960s led to construction of an addition to the building in 1953, followed by a new high school at 1819 Graham Road, approximately one-half-mile (0.80 km) west of the Darrow-Graham intersection. This building, known as the Lakeview building, opened in 1963 as "Stow Senior High School".

Even with the opening of the new Kimpton Junior High School in 1970, overcrowding continued to be an issue. To alleviate the problem, grades nine and ten were sent back to the Workman building in 1971, which became known as Workman High School, while grades eleven and twelve remained at Lakeview. This setup remained in place until the current facility opened in 1987. It is located at 3227 East Graham Road, just over two miles (3.2 km) east of the Darrow-Graham intersection. The name of the school was officially changed to Stow–Munroe Falls High School in 1991. Commencement for the high school's 100th graduating class (2009) was held at E. J. Thomas Hall in downtown Akron, long the traditional venue. In 2013, commencement was moved to the Memorial Athletic and Convocation Center in Kent.

== Academics ==
Stow–Munroe Falls High School offers a broad curriculum designed for students with varying strengths and interests, from college preparatory to intensive career-technical. College bound students opting for a more rigorous schedule may select from 16 Advanced Placement (AP) courses: Art History; Biology; Calculus; Chemistry; Computer Science; English Language; English Literature; European History; Human Geography; Macroeconomics/Microeconomics (combined); Physics; Psychology; Research; Seminar; Spanish Language; Statistics; Studio Art Drawing; Studio Art 2D Design; U.S. Government; and U.S. History. The school also offers the AP Capstone diploma, containing AP Seminar and Research. Although no AP course is offered in Music Theory, students enrolled in Music Theory 2 do have the option of taking the AP test. The high school is also part of the Six District Educational Compact, a joint program of six area school districts (Cuyahoga Falls, Hudson, Kent, Stow–Munroe Falls, Tallmadge and Woodridge) which share access to each of their vocational training facilities and career resources.

== Activities ==
The high school offers numerous clubs, activities and programs for students to participate in beyond the classroom: Business Professionals of America (BPA); Freshman, Sophomore, Junior and Senior Class Executive Committees; DECA; Interact of Rotary International; Key Club; National Honor Society (NHS); Photography Club; Science Olympiad; Ski Club; Stoanno, the school yearbook; Stohion, the school newspaper; Spike Media (social media broadcast news); Bulldogs United; Black Student Union; Student Council; Teammates; and Drama Club.

The Stow Munroe-Falls High School Student Council is one of the most active clubs in the school. They handle the festivities for Homecoming, the winter dance, senior festivities, and activities like the Chess Tournament open to the entire city. The Stow–Munroe Falls High School Speech and Debate team competes in the Eastern Ohio district of the National Speech and Debate Association (NSDA) and the Akron District of the Ohio Speech and Debate Association (OSDA). The team has won state titles in 4-Person Policy Debate (1994, 1998), Lincoln-Douglas Debate (2001), and Public Forum Debate (2009). Its newest state titles include Congressional Debate State Champion Andrew Brantsch (2025), Duo Interpretation Teams Penelope Covey and Lauren Garfield (2024) and Cece Latime and Otis Schoenberg (2026), and the first Spoken Word State Champion Rachel Senderoff (2026). They have also had numerous students receive awards in the top six in the state each year. Since 1994, Stow has sent over 50 students to the NSDA National Tournament, including recent semifinalist (Top 16) Jackson Moore.

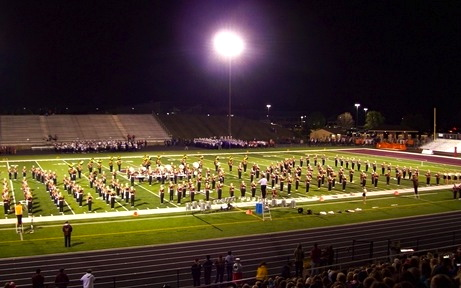
The Bulldog Marching Band performs at the 2013 Stow Band Show.

The Stow–Munroe Falls City School District has been nationally recognized by the NAMM Foundation as one of the "Best Communities for Music Education" for 16 years, and just recently in 2026. The Marching Band Program travels roughly every 4 years to Walt Disney World and just recently performed at Huntington Bank Field at a Cleveland Browns Game. SMFHS offers courses in music theory, as well as a variety of opportunities to participate in both vocal and instrumental music: the school orchestra, choir and band programs; Vocal Jazz, and the concert choir. In addition to offering a Drama Club, Stow–Munroe Falls High School presents several theatrical productions each year: a one-act play festival, the Senior Class Plays (drama and comedy, respectively), and the All-School Musical. Theater participants may also qualify for induction into the International Thespian Society (ITS).

With more than 180 students participating for the 2025-26 school year, the band program is the largest organization at Stow–Munroe Falls High School. The Bulldog Marching Band performs during football games in the fall, and at season's end, members are placed into one of four concert bands: the Freshmen Concert Band, the Maroon Symphonic Band, the Gold Symphonic Band, or the Wind Ensemble. Additionally, a jazz program consisting of three jazz bands – Jazz 1, Jazz 2, and Jazz 3– is offered as an extracurricular activity. Bands and band members also compete at Ohio Music Education Association (OMEA) adjudicated events, often receiving superior ratings. The Bulldog Marching Band has twice won the AAA-class competition at the Gator Bowl in Jacksonville, Florida: first in December 1991, then in January 1996. In 2000, the Wind Ensemble performed for the OMEA State Professional Convention, one of three high school bands selected out of 200 statewide through a blind audition.

== Athletics ==

Stow–Munroe Falls High School is a member of the Northeast District of the Ohio High School Athletic Association (OHSAA). Known as the Bulldogs, Stow's 28 varsity athletic teams compete in the Suburban League National Division: baseball, cheerleading (fall and winter), field hockey, football, gymnastics, ice hockey, softball, and wrestling; and separate boys and girls teams for basketball, bowling, cross country, golf, lacrosse, soccer, swimming and diving, tennis, track and field, volleyball, and newly formed girls flag football team. Before the 2015–16 school year, Stow was a member of the Northeast Ohio Conference (2007–15), the Western Reserve Conference (1996–2007) and the Metro League (1936–96). The Cuyahoga Falls Black Tigers are considered Stow's archrival; other SMFHS rivals include the Hudson Explorers and the Kent Roosevelt Rough Riders. Most teams play home matches at Stow–Munroe Falls High School, while the ice hockey team uses the Kent State University Ice Area as their home venue, and swimming and diving teams hold meets at Akron General Health and Wellness Center North in Stow.

State championships
Sport	Year(s)
Boys soccer	2006
Girls bowling	2017
Girls volleyball	1975, 1981, 1990, 1992

Stow–Munroe Falls won its last state title in 2017 when girls bowling beat Troy High School in three Baker games at Wayne Webb's Columbus Bowl. The last state title won by a boys team occurred in 2006 when boys soccer defeated Fairfield High School in a shootout match at Columbus Crew Stadium. Girls volleyball last won a state title in 1992, though remains the athletic program's most accomplished team sport: tied for 3rd place statewide for most wins in a season (30–0, 1981); 9th place statewide for most wins all-time (583, 1971–2009); tied for 5th place for most state tournament appearances at 11 (1975–76, 1979–81, 1986, 1989–90, 1992, 1997, 2009); a school-record 28 conference championships; and four state titles in 18 seasons of play.

Stow boys basketball has never won a state title, but was considered one of the nation's most competitive squads in the early 1990s. Teams from both 1990 and 1993 advanced to the state final four, the Associated Press ranked Stow #1 in its final state poll for the 1992–93 season, and USA Today repeatedly ranked the teams from the 1992–93 and 1993–94 seasons among the nation's top ten. The girls basketball team finished second in the state in 2007, and girls lacrosse was the Division II state runner-up in 2006 (the majority of Stow teams compete in Division I). In 1996, the baseball team advanced to the state final four, as did boys volleyball in 2001.

The Stow Boys Volleyball team fostered the individual state record for assists by then Senior Carson Wilhoit. He broke the record of 2536 in April of 2026.

== Notable alumni ==
- Larry Csonka (1964) – professional football player in the National Football League (NFL); Most Valuable Player of Super Bowl VIII; Pro Football Hall of Fame inductee
- Haley Bennett (2005, attended only) – singer, songwriter, and actress
- Jok Church (1967) - creator of the comic You Can With Beakman and Jax the TV show Beakman's World
- Richard Cooey (1985) – convicted murderer and rapist; executed in 2008
- Ed Donatell (1975) – NFL assistant coach
- Dan Dorazio (1970) – professional football coach
- Lee Gissendaner (1990) – player personal executive for the Green Bay Packers
- Jim Graner (1937) – weeknight sports anchor for WKYC in Cleveland; color analyst for Cleveland Browns Radio Network
- Dave Jamerson (1985) – 1st-round pick and 15th-overall selection of 1990 NBA draft
- John Magaro (2001) – film and television actor
- Jillian Martin (2022) – professional bowler; youngest-ever to win a Professional Women's Bowling Association (PWBA) Tour event and youngest to win a "triple crown" of PWBA majors
- Shawn Porter (2006) – professional boxer; World Boxing Council (WBC) welterweight champion
- Ranjeev Puri (2002) – politician;member of the Michigan House of Representatives
- Erick Purkhiser (1964) – better known as Lux Interior, lead singer and founding member of The Cramps; pioneer of psychobilly subgenre
- David Walker (2012) – professional basketball player in Liga ACB
- Chris Young (1999) – pitching coach in Major League Baseball (MLB)
