= Hudson High School (Ohio) =

Public High School in Hudson, Ohio, United States

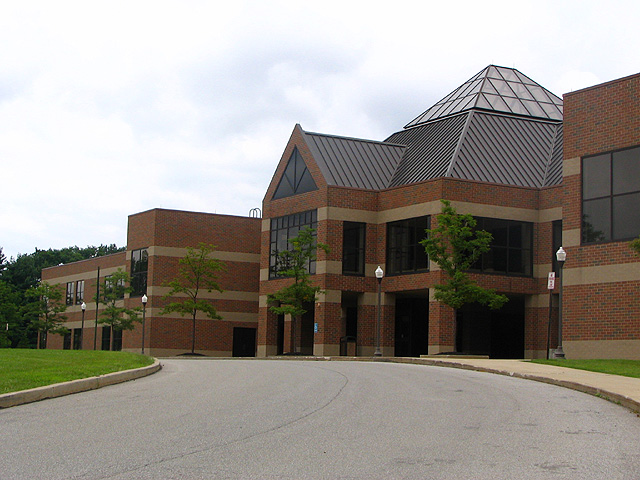

Location
- 2500 Hudson-Aurora Road; Hudson, Ohio 44236; United States; 41°15′15″N 81°25′00″W

Information
- Type: Public
- Established: 1885
- School district: Hudson City School District
- Principal: Mike Miller
- Teaching staff: 93.44 (FTE)
- Grades: 9–12
- Enrollment: 1,429 (2023–2024)
- Student to teacher ratio: 15.29
- Colors: Navy blue and white
- Athletics conference: Suburban League; National Division
- Team name: Explorers
- Rival: Stow-Munroe Falls Bulldogs
- Accreditation: Ohio Department of Education
- Newspaper: The Explorer
- Yearbook: The Log
- Website: hhs.hudson.k12.oh.us

Hudson High School (HHS) is a public high school in Hudson, Ohio, United States. It is the only high school in the Hudson City School District and is located on a 72-acre (29 ha) campus that has been developed to include a variety of performing arts facilities, athletic fields, such as six tennis courts, a lighted baseball field, track, and football stadium. As of the 2014–15 school year, the school has an enrollment of 1,631 students, mainly from Hudson and neighboring Boston Township. The school colors of navy blue and white, and compete in the Suburban League National Division.

As of 2025, the school was ranked No. 396th nationally and 11th in the state by U.S. News & World Report.

== Administration ==
As of 2024, the head principal is Mike Miller.

In March 2005, many of Hudson High School's student body staged a walkout to protest the firing of their principal, Roger Howard.

== Facilities ==
The current building, opened in August 1992, is designed to grow with the community. It was designed by Lesko Architects of Cleveland, Ohio. The academic wing of the high school was built to accommodate 1600 students in 104 teaching stations, while the core facilities such as the library, commons, auditorium, hallways, and offices were designed for a student population of 2200 to 2400. The academic wings are expandable at the east and west ends to increase its capacity to 2400 students. An expansion on the west side of the building was completed in time for the 2006–2007 school year. March 2026 marked the groundbreaking for the first phase of the Harmony Performing Arts Project, a building addition that will feature a new orchestra room.

== Education ==
Hudson High School was established in 1885, and the first class of students graduated that year. Today, a number of special education programs and educational options for gifted students are available. Hudson offers numerous courses at the accelerated level, as well as 22 Advanced Placement (AP) courses. HHS also offers several multi-period enrichment classes that include English and Social Studies curricula, including Service Learning, and New Dimensions. Advanced Placement courses in World Languages are also available. In addition, HHS has technical offerings including basic computer skills, AP Computer Science, and a web design and programming class. The high school also publishes a student newspaper, The Explorer.

The high school is also part of the Six District Educational Compact, a joint program of six area school districts (Cuyahoga Falls, Hudson, Kent, Stow-Munroe Falls, Tallmadge and Woodridge) to share access to each of their vocational training facilities and career resources.

== Athletics ==
Hudson High School is a member of the Ohio High School Athletic Association and the National Division of the Suburban League and offers 25 sports and 58 teams in athletic competition. The school colors are navy blue and white. The sports teams are called the Hudson Explorers, named in honor of Hudsonite Lincoln Ellsworth. Hudson's rival is Stow-Munroe Falls High School.

Hudson Memorial Stadium opened in 2012 and is a privately funded stadium with 6,000 seats located on the high school's current campus, replacing the 3000-seat Lavelli Field at the old high school. It was dedicated by the Murdough Family in honor of all the men and women, including those of Hudson, who have sacrificed their lives in war.

=== State championships ===
- Girls soccer – 2000, 2026
- Boys cross country – 2001
- Boys lacrosse - 2011

=== Other awards ===
- Boys soccer – #1, ESPN's FAB 50, 2002

== Notable alumni ==
- Ben Gedeon, football player in the National Football League (NFL)
- John Hahn, professional golfer
- John Herrick, novelist
- David Kirkpatrick, film producer, screenwriter and studio executive
- Dante Lavelli, football player in the NFL and member of the Pro Football Hall of Fame
- Brad Lepper, archaeologist at the Ohio History Connection
- Bill Nagy, football player in the NFL
- Louie Rolko, professional soccer player in the United Soccer League
- Joe Whitman, baseball player in Major League Baseball
- Brian Winters, football player in the NFL
