= Cuyahoga Falls High School =

Coordinates: 41.1398°N 81.4875°W

Location
- 2630 13th Street; Cuyahoga Falls, Ohio 44221; United States

Information
- Funding type: Public
- School district: Cuyahoga Falls City School District
- Principal: Jason Smith
- Teaching staff: 83.00 (FTE)
- Grades: 9–12
- Enrollment: 1,247 (2023-24)
- Student to teacher ratio: 15.02
- Language: English
- Campus: Suburban
- Colors: Black and gold
- Athletics conference: Metro Athletic Conference
- Team name: Black Tigers
- Rival: Stow-Munroe Falls Bulldogs
- Accreditation: Ohio Department of Education
- Communities served: Cuyahoga Falls, Silver Lake
- Website: www.cfalls.org/cuyahogafallshighschool_home.aspx

Cuyahoga Falls High School (CFHS) is a public high school in Cuyahoga Falls, Ohio, United States. It is the only high school in the Cuyahoga Falls City School District. As of the 2023–24 school year it has an enrollment of 1,247 students in grades 9–12. The school's athletic teams are known as the Black Tigers and compete in the Metro Athletic Conference.

The high school is also part of the Six District Educational Compact, a joint program of six area school districts (Cuyahoga Falls, Hudson, Kent, Stow-Munroe Falls, Tallmadge and Woodridge) to share access to each of their vocational training facilities and career resources.

== History ==
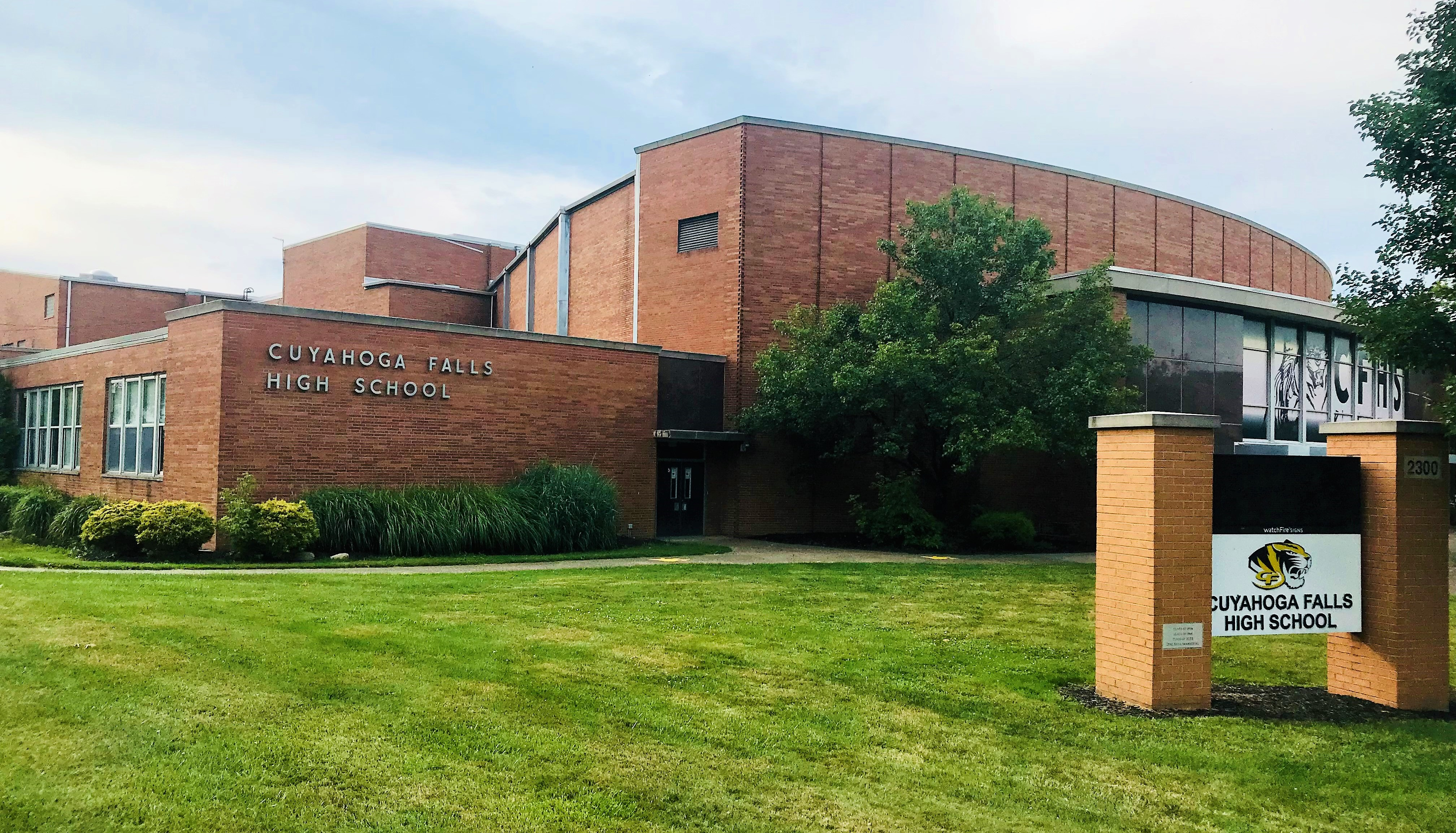
Former home of CFHS on Fourth Street

Cuyahoga Falls High School is located in the Cuyahoga Falls 6–12 Campus, which officially opened for classes in January 2026. It replaced the previous home of CFHS, located on Fourth Street, which dated to 1922.

== Clubs and activities ==
Cuyahoga Falls High School offers a number of co- and extracurricular clubs and activities, such as Academic Challenge (Ohio), National Honor Society, Art Club, Project Love, Book Club, Science Olympiad, Chess Club, Ski Club, DECA, Spanish Club, German Club, French Club, spring musical, fall play, Stage Crew, the M&M's and New Horizons Vocal Jazz groups, the Cuyahoga Falls High School Jazz Ensemble, Gold Tones Jazz Ensemble, the Cuyahoga Falls Marching Tiger Band, and a Latin Club, which functions as a local chapter of both the Ohio Junior Classical League (OJCL) and National Junior Classical League (NJCL).

== State championships ==
- Girls softball – 1980
- Boys gymnastics - 1966

== Notable alumni ==
- Jim Ballard, former professional football player in the National Football League (NFL)
- Robert Berdella, serial killer
- Scotty Bierce, former NFL player
- Jim Boeke, former NFL player
- Dain Clay, professional baseball player for the Cincinnati Reds of Major League Baseball from 1943 to 1946
- Jim Jarmusch, independent film director
- Albert Kingsbury, inventor and engineer
- Bill Lund, former NFL player
- Michael Morell, acting director of the Central Intelligence Agency from 2012 to 2013
