= Hunter Niswander =

American football player (born 1994)

Profile
- Position: Punter

Personal information
- Born: November 26, 1994 (age 31); Peninsula, Ohio, U.S.
- Listed height: 6 ft 5 in (1.96 m)
- Listed weight: 243 lb (110 kg)

Career information
- High school: Woodridge (Peninsula, Ohio)
- College: Northwestern
- NFL draft: 2018: undrafted

Career history
- DC Defenders (2020); Dallas Cowboys (2020–2021); Houston Gamblers / Roughnecks (2023–2024)

Awards and highlights
- Mid-season All-XFL (2020)

Career NFL statistics
- Punts: 26
- Punting yards: 1,228
- Average punt: 47.2
- Inside 20: 10
- Stats at Pro Football Reference

James Hunter Niswander (born November 26, 1994) is an American professional football punter. He played college football at Northwestern University.

== Early life ==
Niswander attended Woodridge High School He was a 3 sport athlete in HS playing soccer, football, and basketball. He led as captain for every team. As a freshman, he made a 35-yard field goal that sealed a state playoff appearance for the first time in school history.

As a senior, he set the state record for most consecutive extra points made (111) and the school longest field goal made (53 yards). He received All-PTC and All-Ohio Division III honors.

Niswander started Christian Athletes in Action at Woodridge and it still exists to this day.

Niswander had many offers from Ohio State, UNC, Oklahoma, LSU, Georgia & Michigan. He received a full-ride from Northwestern University.

== College career ==
- Punted at Northwestern University in Illinois. Punted through wind, sleet, snow, rain, hail, and all other elements at Ryan Field. 90% of his games were indoors, compared to other specialists' statistics who were competing in indoor domes with no elements.*

2013: Niswander earned a full ride football scholarship from the Northwestern University. He began his collegiate career doing 'all 3': kicking field goals, punting, and kick offs. As a freshman, he faced a sudden injury and redshirted.

2014: As a sophomore, Niswander was named the starter at punter. He averaged 42.8 yards per punt and appeared in every game.

2015:Earned NU's Special Teams Player of the Week honors following the victory over Purdue. Niswander averaged 42.8 yards per punt in that game, his best mark of the season ... Placed 5-of-8 punts inside the 20-yard-line in the Penn State victory. As a junior, he ranked 4th in the Big Ten Conference with a 41.3 punt average. He had a 51-yard average in the season opener against Western Michigan University. He made a 62-yard punt against Illinois State University and Michigan State University.

2016: As a senior, Niswander averaged 43 yards per punt. He had a career-high 51.5-yard average against Bowling Green State University. He tied for the fourth longest punt (80 yards) in school history against the University of Iowa. Named to the Ray Guy Award Watch List … Ranked fourth in the Big Ten with a 41.3 punt average … Had a career-high 51.0 average in the season opener versus Western Michigan … Posted career-long punts of 62 yards versus Illinois State and Michigan State … Pinned 20 punts inside the 20 and forced opponents to fair catch 20 punts … Had 11 punts of 50-plus yards … Had a tackle in the ’Cats 38-31 win at Iowa … Named Northwestern’s Special Teams Player of the Week following the Western Michigan game. He also received All-Academic Big Ten honors.

2017: As a 5th year Niswander finished the season with a career-high season average of 43.0, with a season- and career-high single game average of 51.5 in win over Bowling Green … Posted three 50+ yard punts versus Duke … Pinned 19 punts inside the 20 and forced opponents to fair catch 19 punts … Had 16 punts of over 50 yards … Averaged 50.8 yards per punt on five attempts and had three downed inside the 20-yard line in Northwestern’s overtime victory over Iowa … Recorded a career-long punt of 80 yards in Iowa game, tied for the fourth longest punt in program history … Named Big Ten Special Teams Player of the Week following game against Iowa,…Honored again with Big Ten Special Teams Player of the Week after averaging 48.3 yards on six punts and placing 3 punts inside the 20-yard line in win at Illinois ... He also received Academic All-Big Ten Honors.

He earned his degree in Learning and Organizational Change and earned his Masters in Sports Administration during his 5th year.

While at Northwestern, Niswander was more than a student-athlete. He was a student leader at Northwestern Christian Athletes in Action. He also served as the External Relations Intern at Loyal University of Chicago in the Athletic Department. • Responsibilities included: developing marketing plans, social media campaign planning, feature story writing, website management, annual fund solicitation, alumni relations, and corporate sponsorship presentations • Served as: court promotions coordinator, corporate hospitality host, ticket operations/stats assistant • Responsibilities included: developing marketing plans, social media campaign planning, feature story writing, website management, annual fund solicitation, alumni relations, and corporate sponsorship presentations • Served as: court promotions coordinator, corporate hospitality host, ticket operations/stats assistant

Niswander also served on the Northwestern for Life Advisory Group NU where he led and coordinated NU for Life events & served as a liaison to fellow athletes in their professional development. Niswander was also selected by athletic administrators to make impactful decisions benefiting-student athletes, serving as a liaison between student-athlete community, athletic department, and coaches. He learned and implemented new campus resources designed to enhance student-athlete life at Northwestern University. Niswander attended the NCAA Career in Sports Forum, where he was selected to be among 200 student-athletes from every school across all divisions of college athletics to attend an all inclusive annual four day event at the NCAA Headquarters in Indianapolis, Indiana. He developed professionally and as a leader via the NCAA Leadership Development department’s program. He also worked as the Global Partnerships, Strategy and Activation Intern at IMG where he completed strategic consulting with clients within college and professional football, as well as professional soccer. Niswander learned to leverage clients' assets in order to better align them within the present marketplace & emerging points of entry. He also helped at Illinois Baseball Academy as a Program Leader where he served youth players in the community.

== Professional career ==
=== 2020 DC Defenders ===
Niswander attended rookie minicamp in 2018. He was selected in the fifth phase of the 2020 XFL draft by the DC Defenders. He appeared in all 5 games, while punting 21 times for an average of 44.6 yards before COVID shut down the league.

In March, amid the COVID-19 pandemic, the league announced that it would be cancelling the rest of the season. On April 10, he had his contract terminated when the league suspended operations.

The Dallas Cowboys signed Niswander in 2020 after a winning performance at a specialist combine.

=== 2020–2022 Dallas Cowboys ===
On October 26, 2020, Niswander was signed to the Dallas Cowboys' practice squad.

He was promoted to the active roster on November 7, 2020, after punter Chris Jones was placed on injured reserve with a core muscle injury.

He averaged 47.2 yards on 26 punts in the final eight games, tying for ninth-best in the NFL. He landed 10 of his punts inside the 20-yard-line. He kicked a 56 yard punt in Week 16 against the Philadelphia Eagles. His production convinced the Cowboys to release Jones on March 17, 2021.

He finished as a top 10 punter.

On April 7, 2021, punter Bryan Anger was signed to compete with Niswander for the starting position. Niswander did all 3: kickoffs, field goals, and punting in training camp. On August 16, Niswander suffered a back injury during a training camp practice. On August 19, he was placed on injured reserve the next day. On December 28, 2021, he was placed on the reserve/COVID-19 list. On January 10, 2022, he was activated from the reserve/COVID-19 list.

=== 2023 Houston Gamblers ===
Niswander signed with the Houston Gamblers of the USFL on May 3, 2023. Niswander and all other Houston Gamblers players and coaches were all transferred to the Houston Roughnecks after it was announced that the Gamblers took on the identity of their XFL counterpart, the Roughnecks. He was released on July 23, 2024.

Niswander finished with an average of 45.8 yds/punt Finished as one of the top punters in the league Nominated multiple times for player of the week

=== 2024 Houston Roughnecks ===
Finished 2024 season 2nd in the league with 47.0 yard average.

=== 2024–current University of Hawaii Associate Director of Development for Athletics ===
Responsible for Major Gifts for all 20 varsity teams and 450 Rainbow Warrior and Wahine student-athletes
