= Ed Donatell =

American football coach (born 1957)

Personal information
- Born: February 4, 1957 (age 69); Akron, Ohio, U.S.

Career information
- High school: Stow-Munroe Falls (Stow, Ohio)
- College: Glenville State (1975–1979)

Career history
- Kent State Graduate assistant (1979–1980); Washington Graduate assistant (1981–1982); Pacific Defensive backs coach (1983–1985); Idaho Defensive backs coach (1986–1988); Cal State Fullerton Defensive backs coach (1989); New York Jets Defensive backs coach (1990–1994); Denver Broncos Secondary coach (1995–1999); Green Bay Packers Defensive coordinator (2000–2003); Atlanta Falcons Defensive coordinator (2004–2006); New York Jets Special assistant (2007); Washington Defensive coordinator (2008); Denver Broncos Secondary coach (2009–2010); San Francisco 49ers Defensive backs coach (2011–2014); Chicago Bears Defensive backs coach (2015–2018); Denver Broncos Defensive coordinator (2019–2021); Minnesota Vikings Defensive coordinator (2022)

Awards and highlights
- 2× Super Bowl champion (XXXII, XXXIII)
- Coaching profile at Pro Football Reference

Ed Donatell (born February 4, 1957) is an American football coach. He was a defensive coordinator for the Green Bay Packers, Atlanta Falcons, Washington Huskies, Denver Broncos, and Minnesota Vikings. His son Tommy is also an NFL coach.

== Career ==
Donatell served as the defensive coordinator for the University of Washington Huskies football team from January to December 2008 under Tyrone Willingham. He and the entire staff were let go after the winless 2008 season. Previously he served as a special assistant to the New York Jets. Donatell served as the defensive coordinator for the Atlanta Falcons of the National Football League under head coach Jim Mora for three seasons, prior to which he occupied this position for the Green Bay Packers.

He eventually started working as the San Francisco 49ers defensive backs coach under defensive coordinator Vic Fangio. When Fangio joined the Chicago Bears in 2015, Donatell followed.

On January 15, 2019, the Denver Broncos hired Donatell as their defensive coordinator. He tested positive for COVID-19 on November 1, 2020, and missed six games before returning in Week 14.

On February 4, 2022, it was announced that the Seattle Seahawks had hired Donatell in a senior defensive role. However, on February 10, it was announced that Donatell would not be joining the Seahawks and would instead join the Minnesota Vikings as their defensive coordinator for the 2022 season. During this season, the Vikings finished with a 13–4 record and placed 1st in the NFC North, but Donatell's defense ranked 31st in total yards allowed with 6,608, 28th in scoring with 427 points allowed (an average of 25.1 points allowed per game), and three of their four losses were blowouts, while 11 of their 13 victories were by one score. This resulted in a point differential of −3, the first time in NFL history a team finished with at least 12 wins and had a negative point differential. In the playoffs, the Vikings lost to the New York Giants 31–24, their only one-score loss of the season.

On January 19, 2023, Vikings head coach Kevin O'Connell announced Donatell had been fired.

== Personal life ==
He graduated from Stow-Munroe Falls High School in Stow, Ohio, and later earned a master's degree in administration from Kent State University. He is married and has three children. His son Tommy is also a coach and is currently the defensive backs coach for the Washington Commanders.
