= Richard Myers (filmmaker) =

American film director

Richard L. Myers (b. Massillon, Ohio, 1937) is an American experimental filmmaker based in northeast Ohio. He holds a Bachelor of Fine Arts degree (1959) and a Master of Arts degree (1961), both from Kent State University in Kent, Ohio.

Myers taught at Kent State University in the art department beginning in 1964 (retiring in 1991) and is particularly known for his 1970 film Confrontation at Kent State, which he filmed in Kent during the week following the Kent State shootings of May 4, 1970; it is an important document of the period.

Myers began to produce independent films in the early 1960s. Many of his films are highly personal, with non-narrative or loose narrative structures derived from his dreams. Although some films (as, for example, his 1993 film Tarp) feature no actors at all, instead focusing entirely on inanimate objects, most films feature nonprofessional actors and are produced on very small budgets.

Beginning in the late 1960s, Myers and his cinematography students hosted Tuesday Cinema, and later Filmworks, evenings devoted to experimental film that ranged from cutting-edge avant-garde works to Betty Boop cartoons. During this period, Myers had a strong influence on the band Devo, whose members were students at Kent State University, and who were regular Filmworks attendees.

Myers is the recipient of two (due to a name spelling error) Guggenheim Fellowships as well as grants from the American Film Institute and the National Endowment for the Arts.

The Academy Film Archive preserved several of Richard Myers' films, including Akran, The Path, and Allison Beth Krause.

Now retired from Kent State University, Myers lives with his wife in Munroe Falls, Ohio.

== Selected list of films ==
- 1960 – The Path
- 1964 – First Time Here
- 1965 – Coronation
- 1966 – Hiram-Upward Bound
- 1969 – Akran
- 1970 – Akbar
- 1970 – Bill and Ruby
- 1970 – Confrontation at Kent State
- 1971 – Allison
- 1971 – Deathstyles
- 1972 – Zocalo
- 1973 – Da
- 1974 – 37–73
- 1978 – Floorshow
- 1984 – Jungle Girl
- 1990 – Moving Pictures
- 1993 – Tarp
- 1996 – Monstershow
- 2003 – Marjory's Diary
