= Dan Dorazio =

American gridiron football coach (1952–2024)

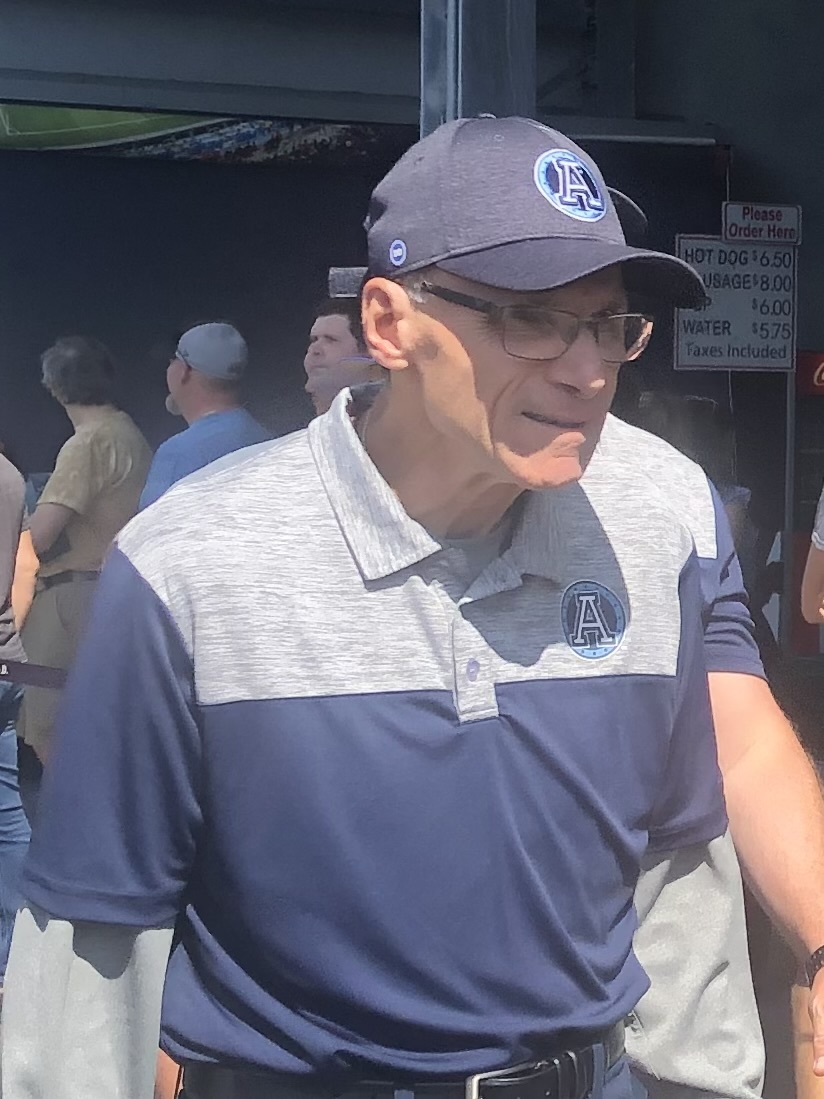
- Dorazio with the Toronto Argonauts in 2019

Profile
- Position: Offensive line coach

Personal information
- Born: January 22, 1952; Wilkinsburg, Pennsylvania, U.S.
- Died: August 13, 2024 (aged 72); Abbotsford, British Columbia, Canada

Career information
- High school: Stow High
- College: Kent State

Career history
- 1972–1974: Kent State (Graduate Assistant)
- 1975–1977: Hawaii
- 1978: San Jose State
- 1979: Washington
- 1980–1981: Northern Iowa
- 1982–1983: Georgia Tech
- 1984–1988: Washington
- 1989–1991: Holy Cross
- 1992–1996: Maryland
- 1997: Boston
- 1998–2002: Calgary Stampeders (Offensive line coach)
- 2003–2014: BC Lions (Offensive line coach)
- 2015: Saskatchewan Roughriders (Offensive line coach)
- 2016–2018: BC Lions (Offensive line coach)
- 2019: Toronto Argonauts (Offensive line coach)
- 2020: UBC (Offensive line coach)
- 2020-2021: Simon Fraser (Co-offensive coordinator, offensive line coach)
- 2023: UBC (Offensive line coach)

Awards and highlights
- 4× Grey Cup champion (1998, 2001, 2006, 2011)

Daniel Joseph Dorazio (January 22, 1952 – August 13, 2024) was an American professional football coach who coached for 26 years in the NCAA, 22 years in the Canadian Football League (CFL), and for one year in U Sports. He was a four-time Grey Cup champion after winning with the Calgary Stampeders in 1998 and 2001 and with the BC Lions in 2006 and 2011. Under his direction as an offensive line coach, he had four players win the CFL's Most Outstanding Offensive Lineman Award.

== Early life and education ==
Dorazio was born to parents Joseph and Helen Dorazio in Wilkinsburg, Pennsylvania, and grew up in Pittsburgh. When he was a teenager, his family moved to Stow, Ohio, where he attended Stow High School. He then attended Kent State University, where he played college football for the Kent State Golden Flashes as a running back.

== Coaching career ==
=== NCAA ===
Dorazio began his coaching career as a graduate assistant on the Kent State Golden Flashes staff and was assigned to the offensive line by head coach Don James. He then spent time with the Hawaii Rainbow Warriors from 1975 to 1977, the San Jose State Spartans in 1978, the Washington Huskies in 1979, the Northern Iowa Panthers from 1980 to 1981, and the Georgia Tech Yellow Jackets from 1982 to 1983.

Dorazio spent a large part of his NCAA coaching career with the Huskies, and joined the team in 1984, reuniting him with head coach James. In 1984, Dorazio's offensive line scheme helped the fourth-ranked Huskies to a victory over the Oklahoma Sooners in the 1985 Orange Bowl. His tenure with the Huskies came to an end after a disappointing 1988 season and he was fired by James.

Dorazio then coached for the Holy Cross Crusaders from 1989 to 1991, the Maryland Terrapins from 1992 to 1996, and the Boston University Terriers in 1997.

=== Calgary Stampeders ===
After 26 years in USA college football, Dorazio was hired by Wally Buono of the Calgary Stampeders to serve as the team's offensive line coach in 1998. In his first season, Fred Childress was named a CFL All-Star as well as the CFL's Most Outstanding Offensive Lineman and the Stampeders won the 86th Grey Cup. After a loss in the 87th Grey Cup, Dorazio won his second championship in 2001 when the Stampeders defeated the Winnipeg Blue Bombers in the 89th Grey Cup. After a disappointing 2002 season, Buono resigned and Dorazio left the Stampeders.

=== BC Lions (first stint) ===
After Buono was hired as the head coach of the BC Lions, Dorazio joined his coaching staff as the team's offensive line coach for the 2003 season. Under his tutelage, Rob Murphy won the CFL's Most Outstanding Offensive Lineman Award in 2005 and 2006 and Dorazio won his third Grey Cup championship following the Lions' victory in the 94th Grey Cup. He won his fourth title in 2011 with the 99th Grey Cup win, and Canadian Hall of Fame player Jovan Olafioye won the Most Outstanding Offensive Lineman Award in 2012. Upon the hiring of Jeff Tedford for the 2015 season, Dorazio was not retained on the coaching staff.

=== Saskatchewan Roughriders ===
On February 2, 2015, it was announced that Dorazio had joined the Saskatchewan Roughriders and Corey Chamblin's staff as the team's offensive line coach, reuniting him with former BC Lions offensive coordinator, Jacques Chapdelaine. The Roughriders finished with a league-worst 3–15 record and the entire coaching staff was dismissed.

=== BC Lions (second stint) ===
After Tedford resigned as the Lions' head coach and Buono returned as head coach, Dorazio was hired back to his coaching staff for the 2016 season. He spent three seasons in his second stint as the Lions' offensive line coach. He was not retained for the 2019 season by the team's new head coach, DeVone Claybrooks.

=== Toronto Argonauts ===
On February 7, 2019, it was announced that Dorazio had joined the Toronto Argonauts as the team's offensive line coach, with Chapdelaine and Chamblin also serving on the team's coaching staff, the latter as head coach. After a disappointing season for the team, Chamblin was fired and replaced by Ryan Dinwiddie, who subsequently hired Stephen McAdoo as the new offensive line coach to replace Dorazio for 2020.

=== Canadian university football ===
Dorazio was hired as the offensive line coach for the UBC Thunderbirds, but only spent spring training with the team as the 2020 U Sports football season was cancelled. He was then hired by Simon Fraser on August 29, 2020, by interim head coach Mike Rigell, to serve as the team's offensive line coach and co-offensive coordinator. Their 2020 season play was cancelled, however, coaching continued into the 2021 season play for Simon Fraser.

On March 22, 2023, it was announced that Dorazio had re-joined the Thunderbirds as their offensive line coach. In 2023, offensive linemen Theo Benedet and Giovanni Manu were named to U Sports All-Canadian teams with the former winning the J. P. Metras Trophy and the latter being selected in the 2024 NFL draft. The Thunderbirds also played in the 58th Vanier Cup that year, but lost to the Montreal Carabins.

== Personal life and death ==
Dorazio was married to Lisa Caroglanian Dorazio and had three children and four grandchildren. His daughter Christina predeceased him in 1999.

Dorazio died of pancreatic cancer in Abbotsford, British Columbia, on August 13, 2024, at the age of 72.
