= Tommy Donatell =

American football coach (born 1989)

Washington Commanders
- Title: Safeties coach

Personal information
- Born: March 29, 1989 (age 37); Olympia, Washington, U.S.
- Listed height: 6 ft 2 in (1.88 m)
- Listed weight: 205 lb (93 kg)

Career information
- Positions: Quarterback; linebacker; strong safety
- High school: Peachtree Ridge (Suwanee, Georgia)
- College: Iowa (2008–2012)

Career history
- South Florida Bulls (2013–2014) Graduate assistant; UCLA Bruins (2015–2016) Graduate assistant; Seattle Seahawks (2017–2020) Defensive quality control coach; Los Angeles Chargers (2021–2023); Assistant secondary coach (2021–2022); Defensive passing game coordinator/secondary coach (2023); Washington Commanders (2024–present); Defensive backs coach (2024–2025); Defensive backs/safeties coach (2026–present)

Tommy Donatell (born March 29, 1989) is an American professional football coach who is the safeties coach for the Washington Commanders of the National Football League (NFL). He has also coached with the Seattle Seahawks and Los Angeles Chargers. Donatell played college football for the Iowa Hawkeyes as a quarterback, linebacker, and strong safety. He is the son of NFL coach Ed Donatell.

== Early life and college career ==
Dontell was born on March 29, 1989, in Olympia, Washington. He played college football from 2008 to 2012 as a walk-on for the Iowa Hawkeyes, originally as a quarterback before moving to linebacker and strong safety.

== Coaching career ==
=== Seattle Seahawks ===
The Seahawks hired Donatell as their defensive quality control coach in 2017. He served in this capacity for four seasons.

=== Los Angeles Chargers ===
Donatell was hired by the Los Angeles Chargers as an assistant secondary coach in 2021. Donatell was promoted to defensive pass game coordinator and secondary coach in 2023.

=== Washington Commanders ===
In February 2024, Donatell was hired as the defensive backs coach for the Washington Commanders. He was reassigned to safeties coach in February 2026.

== Personal life ==
Donatell is the son of NFL coach Ed Donatell. He and his wife Rebecca have three sons: Drake, Jack, and Bennett.
