= Munroe Falls, Ohio =

- City
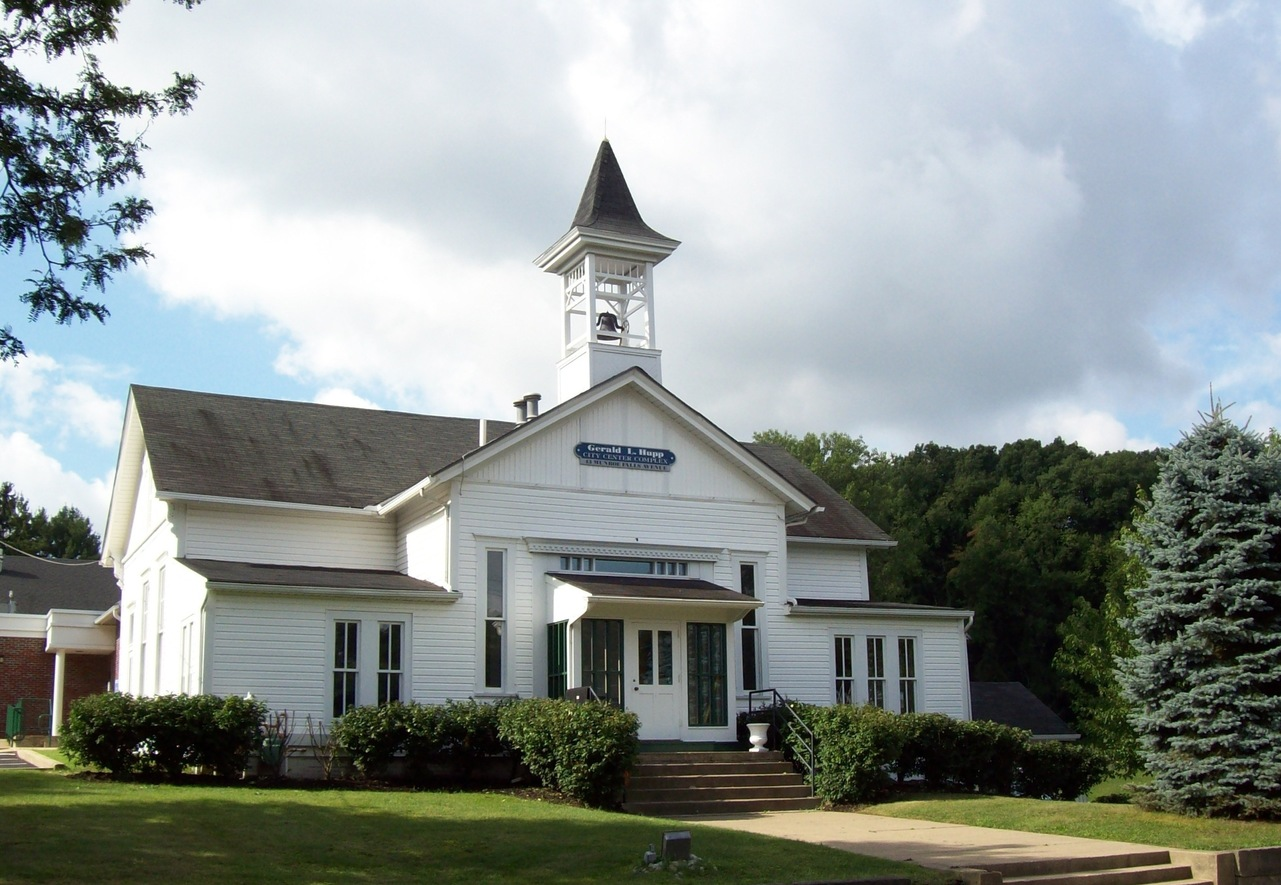
- Munroe Falls City Hall

- Flag Seal Logo
- Motto: "A Great Place to Call Home"
- Interactive map of Munroe Falls, Ohio
- Location within Ohio Location within the United States
- Coordinates: 41°07′40″N 81°25′48″W
- Country: United States
- State: Ohio
- County: Summit
- Founded: 1838

Area
  - Total: 2.86 sq mi (7.41 km^{2})
  - Land: 2.77 sq mi (7.17 km^{2})
  - Water: 0.093 sq mi (0.24 km^{2})
- Elevation: 1,024 ft (312 m)

Population (2020)
  - Total: 5,044
  - Density: 1,821.3/sq mi (703.22/km^{2})
- Time zone: UTC-5 (EST)
  - Summer (DST): UTC-4 (EDT)
- ZIP code: 44262
- Area codes: 330, 234
- FIPS code: 39-53312
- GNIS feature ID: 1087008
- Website: munroefalls.com

Munroe Falls is a city in east-central Summit County, Ohio, United States, along the Cuyahoga River. The population was 5,044 at the 2020 census. It is a suburb of Akron and is part of the Akron metropolitan area.

== History ==
Like much of the Connecticut Western Reserve, the area that makes up present-day Munroe Falls was previously inhabited by various tribes of American Indians. When the Western Reserve began being surveyed in 1796, what is now Munroe Falls was mostly in the southern part of the survey township Town 3, Range 10 (later to be Stow Township), then a part of Washington County before being placed in the new Jefferson County the following year. In 1800, it was made part of Trumbull County, which followed the boundaries of the Western Reserve, and in 1808, the area was made part of Portage County.

The first settlers in present-day Munroe Falls, a group of around 40 people including Francis Kelsey and William Stow, came in 1809. William Stow built a log house to serve as his residence at what is now the northwest corner of Ohio State Route 91 and Munroe Falls Avenue. Kelsey built a sawmill on the south side of the Cuyahoga River and a gristmill was built on the north side. The initial name of the new village was Kelsey's Mills (also Kelsey Mills). The first school in Munroe Falls was built in 1816. In 1817 a wooden dam was built to provide power for both mills and the name of the village was changed to Florence.

Around 1836, William and Edmund Munroe (also spelled Monroe) from Boston arrived and purchased the two mills and approximately 250 acres (101 ha) of land around them to lay out a new village, which they named Munroe Falls. The village was incorporated October 26, 1838. The Munroes had great plans for the village to become a center of commerce and an important city, but these plans never worked out.

The "Munroe Falls Manufacturing Co." was granted a charter by the Ohio Legislature in April 1837 to cultivate and manufacture cotton, flour, paper, silk, sugar and wool, including machinery and tools towards these purposes. The keys to their plans were to found a silk industry, which involved cultivating mulberry trees and silkworms. The trees thrived, the worms did not. Shortly after its founding the Munroe Falls Manufacturing Co. founded a bank, which issued various, unbacked currency. For the next few years the local economy thrived under the nearly unlimited credit afforded to its customers by the Company and its Bank, but ultimately the macroeconomics of the period prevailed, and both the Company and Bank failed, leaving many local residents holding worthless currency. After about 10 years, which included the economic instability of the Panic of 1837, the Munroes, who had arrived wealthy, defaulted to many of the creditors and the properties they owned were taken over by other individuals.

The Pennsylvania and Ohio Canal opened in 1840 and passed through Munroe Falls, the first boats landing on August 6 of that year arriving from New Castle, Pennsylvania. It closed around 1870. Also in 1840, Munroe Falls was made part of the new Summit County. In 1866, the old gristmill was purchased by the Cleveland Paper Company and refitted for paper manufacturing. The building burned down approximately 1–2 years later and the present factory (today owned by Sonoco Products) was built on the same site. In 1884 railroad tracks were laid in the former canal bed as part of a single line owned by the Pittsburgh and Western Railroad. These tracks were doubled in 1900 following the purchase of the railroad by Baltimore and Ohio Railroad.

In 1921, the community applied for and was granted village status. This action was taken to avoid becoming a part of neighboring Stow, which was applying for similar status and had included sections of Munroe Falls in its application. Finding that, as a village, there was not enough population to maintain self-sufficiency, the village held city officer elections for the first time in 1925 to revoke the village charter and receive county services.

The village got a new town hall in the 1960s. This building, which continues to serve as city hall, was constructed in 1885 to serve as the Munroe Falls Schoolhouse, serving its original purpose until 1916. Munroe Falls converted to city status in 1991.

In the early 2000s, the Ohio Environmental Protection Agency (EPA) and Summit County determined that the oxygen levels were too low in the Cuyahoga River, due mostly to the stagnant pool behind the Munroe Falls dam. The solution was to lower the dam, which dated to 1903. Eventually, the entire dam was removed after workers discovered a natural ledge underneath the existing dam. This project, begun in August 2005 and completed in October 2006, was part of a larger project along much of the river in the city that included cleanup and restoration.

== Geography ==
Munroe Falls is located in eastern Summit County adjacent to the cities of Stow to the north, Tallmadge to the south, and Cuyahoga Falls to the west with the village of Silver Lake on the northwest. It was formed from parts of the now-defunct Stow and Tallmadge townships.

According to the United States Census Bureau, the city has a total area of 2.81 square miles (7.28 km^{2}), of which 2.72 square miles (7.04 km^{2}) is land and 0.09 square miles (0.23 km^{2}) is water.

== Demographics ==
Historical population
Census	Pop.	Note	%±
1930	302		—
1940	511		69.2%
1950	933		82.6%
1960	1,828		95.9%
1970	3,794		107.5%
1980	4,731		24.7%
1990	5,359		13.3%
2000	5,314		−0.8%
2010	5,012		−5.7%
2020	5,044		0.6%
2025 (est.)	4,973		−1.4%

=== 2020 census ===
As of the 2020 census, Munroe Falls had a population of 5,044. The median age was 47.4 years. 17.8% of residents were under the age of 18 and 25.8% of residents were 65 years of age or older. For every 100 females there were 92.7 males, and for every 100 females age 18 and over there were 89.1 males age 18 and over.

100.0% of residents lived in urban areas, while 0.0% lived in rural areas.

There were 2,082 households in Munroe Falls, of which 26.2% had children under the age of 18 living in them. Of all households, 54.5% were married-couple households, 13.3% were households with a male householder and no spouse or partner present, and 25.2% were households with a female householder and no spouse or partner present. About 26.6% of all households were made up of individuals and 13.2% had someone living alone who was 65 years of age or older.

There were 2,158 housing units, of which 3.5% were vacant. The homeowner vacancy rate was 1.3% and the rental vacancy rate was 5.6%.

Racial composition as of the 2020 census
Race	Number	Percent
White	4,415	87.5%
Black or African American	111	2.2%
American Indian and Alaska Native	9	0.2%
Asian	203	4.0%
Native Hawaiian and Other Pacific Islander	2	0.0%
Some other race	38	0.8%
Two or more races	266	5.3%
Hispanic or Latino (of any race)	89	1.8%

=== 2010 census ===
As of the census of 2010, there were 5,012 people, 2,086 households, and 1,467 families residing in the city. The population density was 1,842.6 inhabitants per square mile (711.4/km^{2}). There were 2,189 housing units at an average density of 804.8 per square mile (310.7/km^{2}). The racial makeup of the city was 95.6% White, 1.5% African American, 0.1% Native American, 1.4% Asian, 0.2% from other races, and 1.2% from two or more races. Hispanic or Latino of any race were 1.2% of the population.

There were 2,086 households, of which 27.0% had children under the age of 18 living with them, 58.1% were married couples living together, 8.5% had a female householder with no husband present, 3.7% had a male householder with no wife present, and 29.7% were non-families. 25.2% of all households were made up of individuals, and 10.2% had someone living alone who was 65 years of age or older. The average household size was 2.40 and the average family size was 2.87.

The median age in the city was 45.1 years. 20.2% of residents were under the age of 18; 7.2% were between the ages of 18 and 24; 22.3% were from 25 to 44; 33.8% were from 45 to 64; and 16.3% were 65 years of age or older. The gender makeup of the city was 48.7% male and 51.3% female.

Of the city's population over the age of 25, 42.0% hold a bachelor's degree or higher.

=== 2000 census ===
As of the census of 2000, there were 5,314 people, 1,955 households, and 1,524 families residing in the city. The population density was 1,939.8 inhabitants per square mile (749.0/km^{2}). There were 2,035 housing units at an average density of 742.9 per square mile (286.8/km^{2}). The racial makeup of the city was 97.10% White, 0.92% African American, 0.02% Native American, 1.19% Asian, 0.06% Pacific Islander, 0.09% from other races, and 0.62% from two or more races. Hispanic or Latino of any race were 0.70% of the population.

There were 1,955 households, out of which 35.0% had children under the age of 18 living with them, 68.7% were married couples living together, 6.7% had a female householder with no husband present, and 22.0% were non-families. 18.8% of all households were made up of individuals, and 6.3% had someone living alone who was 65 years of age or older. The average household size was 2.66 and the average family size was 3.04.

In the city the population was spread out, with 24.6% under the age of 18, 6.4% from 18 to 24, 25.6% from 25 to 44, 29.8% from 45 to 64, and 13.6% who were 65 years of age or older. The median age was 41 years. For every 100 females, there were 94.4 males. For every 100 females age 18 and over, there were 91.8 males.

The median income for a household in the city was $61,169, and the median income for a family was $69,918. Males had a median income of $51,277 versus $31,563 for females. The per capita income for the city was $27,317. About 0.3% of families and 1.5% of the population were below the poverty line, including 0.8% of those under age 18 and 0.8% of those age 65 or over.

== Education ==
Munroe Falls is primarily served by the Stow–Munroe Falls City School District. Serving more than 5,700 students, the district operates six elementary schools (Echo Hills, Fishcreek, Highland, Indian Trail, Riverview and Woodland), Lakeview Intermediate School, Kimpton Middle School and Stow-Munroe Falls High School. Riverview Elementary and Kimpton Middle School are located in Munroe Falls, while the remainder of the district's facilities are located in Stow. A small portion of Munroe Falls is part of the neighboring Tallmadge school district.

== Parks and Recreation ==
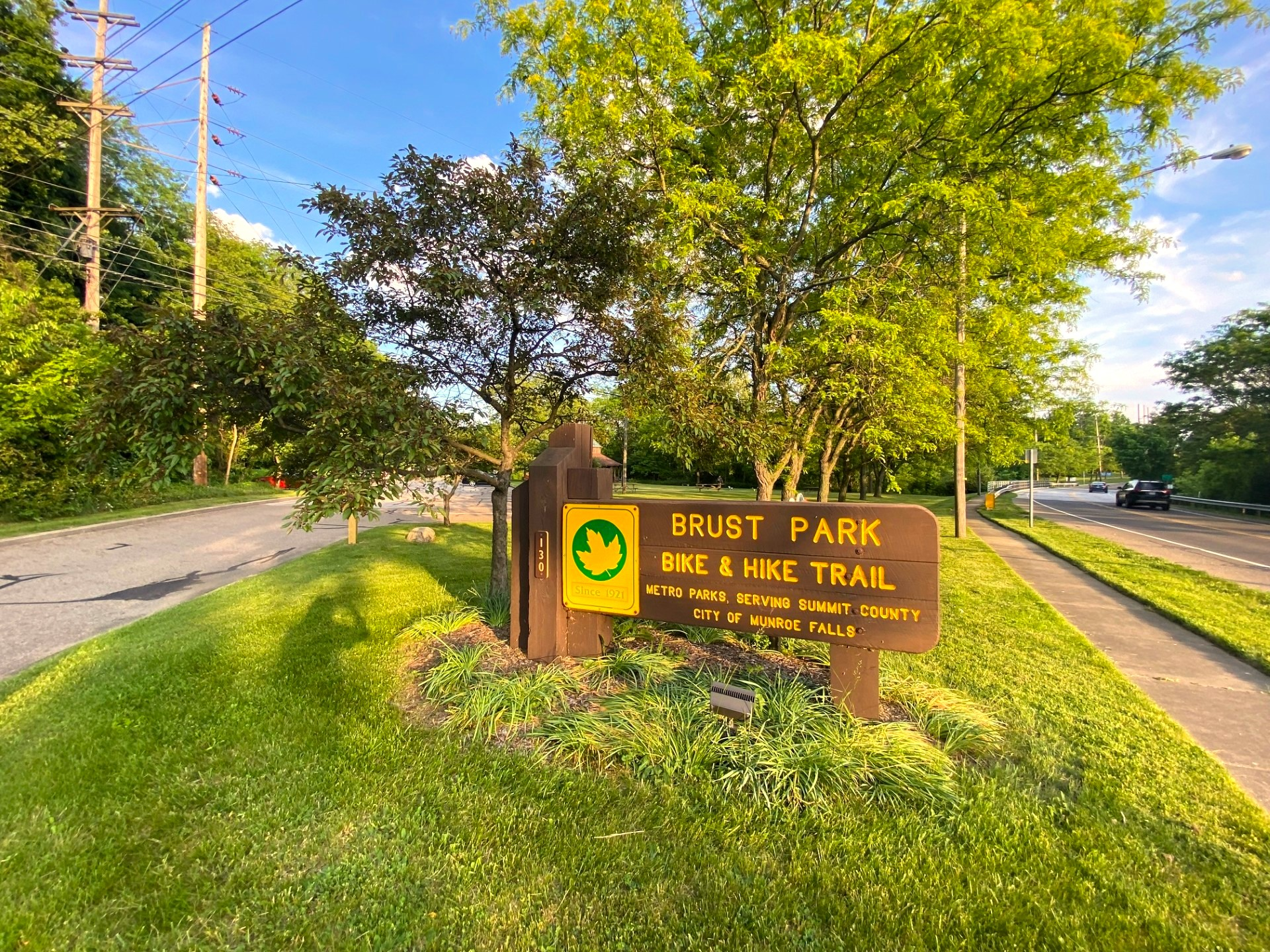
Entrance to Brust Park

Summit Metro Parks has two parks located in Munroe Falls: the Munroe Falls Metro Park, which features a swimming lake; and Tallmadge Meadows. The city owns and operates two parks: Brust Park and Guise Park. The Summit Bike & Hike Trail goes through Brust Park, and is maintained by Summit Metro Parks.

== Notable people ==
- John Magaro - actor
- Richard Myers - independent/experimental filmmaker
