= Chris Young (baseball coach) =

American baseball coach (born 1981)

- Coach
- Born: April 19, 1981 (age 45); Biloxi, Mississippi, U.S.
- Bats: Right Throws: Right
- Stats at Baseball Reference

Teams
- As coach: Philadelphia Phillies (2018–2019); Chicago Cubs (2020–2023)

Christopher Matthew Young (born April 19, 1981) is an American professional baseball coach who most recently was the bullpen coach for the Chicago Cubs of Major League Baseball (MLB). He formerly served as pitching coach for the Philadelphia Phillies. Previously, he was a pitcher in Minor League Baseball.

== Early life ==
Young was born in Biloxi, Mississippi. He attended Stow-Munroe Falls High School in Stow, Ohio.

== Baseball career ==
=== Playing career ===
Young attended Mississippi State University, and played college baseball for the Mississippi State Bulldogs. He earned Freshman All-America honors. In 2001 he was 5–1 with a 2.81 ERA. In 2002, he had a 5–2 win–loss record with a 3.67 earned run average (ERA), and was named the Southeastern Conference Pitcher of the Week for the week ending May 20. Young earned a Bachelor of Business Administration in marketing from Mississippi State University.

The Colorado Rockies selected Young in the 18th round of the 2002 Major League Baseball draft, and he played in Minor League Baseball for six seasons, pitching in as high as Triple-A. He was 24–23 with a 3.54 ERA in 409 1/3 innings pitched over 266 games played.

=== Scouting and coaching career ===
Young worked as a scout for the San Diego Padres from 2010 through 2014, and as a scout and scouting supervisor for the Houston Astros from 2015 through 2017. After the 2017 season, the Phillies hired Young as an assistant pitching coach for their major league roster. He was promoted to pitching coach for the 2019 season. He was fired after the 2019 season.

On November 7, 2019, the Chicago Cubs hired Young to be the bullpen coach. He was the first new addition to the Cubs' coaching staff under David Ross.
