= John Herrick (writer) =

American novelist and nonfiction author

- Born: St. Louis, Missouri, U.S.
- Education: Hudson High School; University of Missouri
- Occupation: Writer
- Writing career
- Period: 2010–present
- Genres: Fiction, Nonfiction
- Website: www.johnherrick.net

John Herrick is an American novelist and nonfiction author.

== Personal life and education ==
Herrick is a native of St. Louis, Missouri. He spent part of his childhood in Hudson, Ohio, where he has set several of his novels, and attended Hudson High School. He graduated from the University of Missouri.

Herrick professes a Christian faith. Though he has not publicly aligned himself with a specific denomination, he has cited one early influence as Joyce Meyer, prior to her international notoriety. He has also stated he incorporates speaking in tongues and other characteristics commonly associated with the Charismatic Movement.

He has acknowledged a personal struggle with depression.

== Career ==
Herrick's career has included a range of fields, including ghostwriter, Information technology and fund development. In fact, he credits his years in information technology as providing the framework for constructing his novels. He began his writing career in the radio industry.

Often, he incorporates faith-related angles into his novels, such as spiritual journeys (From the Dead, 2010) and homosexuality (Between These Walls, 2015).

He is the author of one non-fiction book, 8 Reasons Your Life Matters.

== Bibliography ==
- From the Dead (2010)
- The Landing (2012)
- Shaking Scripture (2012) (Foreword)
- 8 Reasons Your Life Matters (2014)
- Between These Walls (2015)
- Hit and Run (2016)
- Beautiful Mess (2017)
- Mona Lisas and Little White Lies (2019)
