= Peninsula Village Historic District =

Historic district in Ohio, United States

- U.S. National Register of Historic Places
- U.S. Historic district
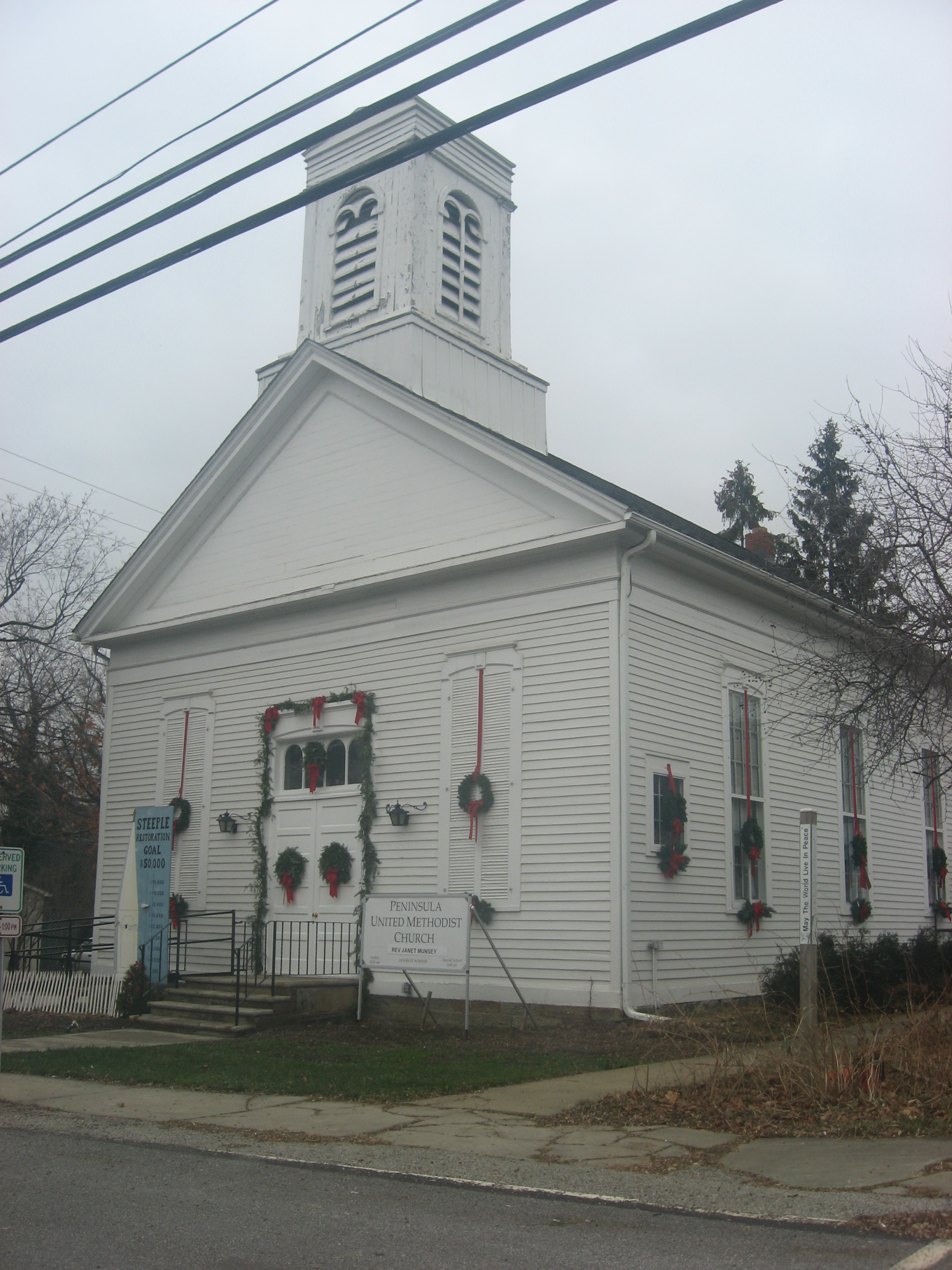
- Peninsula United Methodist Church

- Location within Ohio Location within the United States
- Location: Both sides of OH 303, Peninsula, Ohio
- Area: 53 acres (21 ha)
- Built: 1827
- Architectural style: Greek Revival, Other, Federal, Italianate
- NRHP reference No.: 74000346 (original); 100000974 (increase)

Significant dates
- Added to NRHP: August 23, 1974
- Boundary increase: May 8, 2017

Peninsula Village Historic District is a historic district located on both sides of Ohio State Route 303 in Peninsula, Ohio. The district encompasses the historic core of Peninsula, which is situated inside of Cuyahoga Valley National Park. Peninsula was settled by Hermon Bronson in 1824 and platted in 1837; in its early years, it was a stop along the Ohio and Erie Canal and home to a mill on the Cuyahoga River. Canal traffic and the construction of the Valley Railway in 1875 spurred the village's continued economic growth through the nineteenth century. The district includes examples of Greek Revival, Federal style, and Italianate architecture, all of which were popular nineteenth century styles. Significant buildings in the district include the Town Hall, a railroad depot, Peninsula High School, the G.A.R. Hall, and three churches.

The district was added to the National Register of Historic Places in 1974. Its boundaries were expanded in 2017 to include additional buildings and Deep Lock Quarry Metro Park.
