= 1989 Miami Hurricanes baseball team =

American college baseball season

1989 Miami Hurricanes baseball

NCAA East Regional champions

College World Series, 1–2
- Conference: Independent
- Record: 49–18
- Head coach: Ron Fraser (27th year)
- Home stadium: Mark Light Field

1989 NCAA Division I baseball independents standings
	Conf.				Overall
Team	W		L	PCT	W		L	PCT
Wright State ‍‍‍		–		–	45	–	12	.789
Nicholls State ‍‍‍^{y}		–		–	44	–	16	.733
No. 6 Miami (FL) ‍‍‍^{y}		–		–	49	–	18	.731
Oral Roberts ‍‍‍		–		–	36	–	18	.667
No. 25 UCF ‍‍‍^{y}		–		–	42	–	22	.656
FIU ‍‍‍		–		–	39	–	21	.650
Southeastern Louisiana ‍‍‍		–		–	33	–	20	.623
UMBC ‍‍‍		–		–	27	–	17	.614
New Mexico State ‍‍‍		–		–	34	–	22	.607
Florida A&M ‍‍‍		–		–	20	–	16	.556
Liberty ‍‍‍		–		–	25	–	24	.510
Tulane ‍‍‍		–		–	27	–	26	.509
Akron ‍‍‍		–		–	24	–	24	.500
Wisconsin–Milwaukee ‍‍‍		–		–	22	–	22	.500
Youngstown State ‍‍‍		–		–	19	–	20	.487
United States International ‍‍‍		–		–	24	–	35	.407
Northern Colorado ‍‍‍		–		–	18	–	29	.383
Davidson ‍‍‍		–		–	12	–	27	.308
y – Invited to the NCAA tournament As of June 30, 1989; Rankings from Collegiate Baseball

The 1989 Miami Hurricanes baseball team represented the University of Miami in the 1989 NCAA Division I baseball season. The Hurricanes played their home games at Mark Light Field. The team was coached by Ron Fraser in his 27th season at Miami.

The Hurricanes reached the College World Series, where they finished tied for fifth after winning one game and losing another against semifinalist LSU and losing to eventual runner-up Texas.

== Personnel ==
=== Roster ===
1989 Miami Hurricanes roster

Pitchers

- - Jeff Alkire
- - Alex Fernandez
- - Joe Grahe
- - Greg Knowles
- - Oscar Múñoz
- - Steve Tucker
- -Jim West.

Catchers

- - Jorge Fabregas

Infielders

- - Kirk Dulom
- - F. P. Santangelo
- - Mike Tosar
- - Jose Trujillo

   Mark Mitchell 

Outfielders

- - Gino DiMare
- - Rey Noriega
- - Will Vespe

Unknown

- - Jeff Borgese
- - Elliot Cianchini
- - Juan Flores
- - Henry Hernandez
- - Mike Hinde
- - Chris Hirsch
- - Ron Martinelli
- - Donald Robinson
- - Scott Sharts
- - Sean Stall
- - John Viera
- - Larry Walker

=== Coaches ===
1989 Miami Hurricanes baseball coaching staff
- Ron Fraser – Head coach – 27th year

== Schedule and results ==
Legend
Miami win
Miami loss

1989 Miami Hurricanes baseball game log
Regular season

February
Date	Opponent	Site/stadium	Score	Overall record
Feb 5	UCF	Mark Light Field • Coral Gables, FL	W 4–1	1–0
Feb 6	UCF	Mark Light Field • Coral Gables, FL	W 5–1	2–0
Feb 7	UCF	Mark Light Field • Coral Gables, FL	W 15–0	3–0
Feb 10	South Florida	Mark Light Field • Coral Gables, FL	W 1–0^{12}	4–0
Feb 11	South Florida	Mark Light Field • Coral Gables, FL	W 9–5	5–0
Feb 17	Tennessee	Mark Light Field • Coral Gables, FL	W 4–1	6–0
Feb 18	Tennessee	Mark Light Field • Coral Gables, FL	L 5–6^{11}	6–1
Feb 19	Seton Hall	Mark Light Field • Coral Gables, FL	W 11–2	7–1
Feb 20	Seton Hall	Mark Light Field • Coral Gables, FL	L 1–5	7–2
Feb 25	at Texas	Disch–Falk Field • Austin, TX	W 9–5	8–2
Feb 26	at Texas	Disch–Falk Field • Austin, TX	L 2–5	8–3
Feb 27	at Texas	Disch–Falk Field • Austin, TX	L 5–6	8–4

March
Date	Opponent	Site/stadium	Score	Overall record
Mar 1	Barry	Mark Light Field • Coral Gables, FL	W 9–1	9–4
Mar 3	Minnesota	Mark Light Field • Coral Gables, FL	W 5–4	10–4
Mar 4	Minnesota	Mark Light Field • Coral Gables, FL	W 13–4	11–4
Mar 5	Minnesota	Mark Light Field • Coral Gables, FL	W 7–6	12–4
Mar 8	Notre Dame	Mark Light Field • Coral Gables, FL	L 2–4	12–5
Mar 9	Boston University	Mark Light Field • Coral Gables, FL	W 17–0^{7}	13–5
Mar 10	Southern Illinois	Mark Light Field • Coral Gables, FL	W 6–0	14–5
Mar 11	Southern Illinois	Mark Light Field • Coral Gables, FL	W 10–6	15–5
Mar 12	Creighton	Mark Light Field • Coral Gables, FL	W 2–1^{10}	16–5
Mar 13	Creighton	Mark Light Field • Coral Gables, FL	W 6–5	17–5
Mar 14	Baltimore Orioles	Mark Light Field • Coral Gables, FL	L 0–5	
Mar 15	Pace	Mark Light Field • Coral Gables, FL	W 6–3	18–5
Mar 17	Maine	Mark Light Field • Coral Gables, FL	W 8–1	19–5
Mar 18	Maine	Mark Light Field • Coral Gables, FL	W 2–0	20–5
Mar 19	Maine	Mark Light Field • Coral Gables, FL	L 3–4	20–6
Mar 21	Florida	Mark Light Field • Coral Gables, FL	L 10–13	20–7
Mar 22	Florida	Mark Light Field • Coral Gables, FL	W 4–0	21–7
Mar 24	Rutgers	Mark Light Field • Coral Gables, FL	W 16–8	22–7
Mar 25	Rutgers	Mark Light Field • Coral Gables, FL	W 7–4	23–7
Mar 27	Michigan State	Mark Light Field • Coral Gables, FL	W 7–5	24–7
Mar 28	Stetson	Mark Light Field • Coral Gables, FL	W 5–3	25–7
Mar 29	Stetson	Mark Light Field • Coral Gables, FL	L 8–9^{10}	25–8

April
Date	Opponent	Site/stadium	Score	Overall record
Apr 1	at Florida	Alfred A. McKethan Stadium • Gainesville, FL	L 1–7	25–9
Apr 2	at Florida	Alfred A. McKethan Stadium • Gainesville, FL	L 2–3	25–10
Apr 7	at Florida State	Dick Howser Stadium • Tallahassee, FL	L 0–3	25–11
Apr 8	at Florida State	Dick Howser Stadium • Tallahassee, FL	W 8–1	26–11
Apr 9	at Florida State	Dick Howser Stadium • Tallahassee, FL	L 0–3	26–12
Apr 14	Florida Atlantic	Mark Light Field • Coral Gables, FL	W 14–0	27–12
Apr 15	Florida Atlantic	Mark Light Field • Coral Gables, FL	W 14–0	28–12
Apr 18	St. Thomas	Mark Light Field • Coral Gables, FL	W 9–0	29–12
Apr 21	FIU	Mark Light Field • Coral Gables, FL	W 5–2	30–12
Apr 22	FIU	Mark Light Field • Coral Gables, FL	W 7–2	31–12
Apr 23	at FIU	Miami, FL	W 9–6	32–12
Apr 25	Boca Raton	Mark Light Field • Coral Gables, FL	W 5–3	33–12
Apr 28	at Clemson	Beautiful Tiger Field • Clemson, SC	W 11–5	34–12
Apr 29	at Clemson	Beautiful Tiger Field • Clemson, SC	W 10–2	35–12
Apr 30	at Clemson	Beautiful Tiger Field • Clemson, SC	L 4–5	35–13

May
Date	Opponent	Site/stadium	Score	Overall record
May 2	Eckerd	Mark Light Field • Coral Gables, FL	W 7–6	36–13
May 5	Florida State	Mark Light Field • Coral Gables, FL	W 11–2	37–13
May 6	Florida State	Mark Light Field • Coral Gables, FL	W 8–2	38–13
May 7	Florida State	Mark Light Field • Coral Gables, FL	L 4–8	38–14
May 9	Tampa	Mark Light Field • Coral Gables, FL	L 12–13	38–15
May 12	Mercer	Mark Light Field • Coral Gables, FL	W 12–3	39–15
May 13	Mercer	Mark Light Field • Coral Gables, FL	W 9–4	40–15
May 14	Mercer	Mark Light Field • Coral Gables, FL	W 10–3	41–15
May 19	vs NC State	Boshamer Stadium • Chapel Hill, NC	W 7–4	42–15
May 20	vs Clemson	Boshamer Stadium • Chapel Hill, NC	W 2–0	43–15
May 21	vs Arizona	Boshamer Stadium • Chapel Hill, NC	W 11–1	44–15

Postseason

NCAA East Regional
Date	Opponent	Seed	Site/stadium	Score	Overall record	NCAAT record
May 25	Villanova	Alfred A. McKethan Stadium • Gainesville, FL	W 4–0	45–15	1–0	
May 26	Georgia Tech	Alfred A. McKethan Stadium • Gainesville, FL	L 7–9	45–16	1–1	
May 27	Florida	Alfred A. McKethan Stadium • Gainesville, FL	W 9–1	46–16	2–1	
May 28	UCF	Alfred A. McKethan Stadium • Gainesville, FL	W 10–1	47–16	3–1	
May 28	Villanova	Alfred A. McKethan Stadium • Gainesville, FL	W 4–1	48–16	4–1	

College World Series
Date	Opponent	Seed	Site/stadium	Score	Overall record	CWS record
June 3	(6) LSU	(3)	Johnny Rosenblatt Stadium • Omaha, NE	W 5–2	49–16	1–0
June 5	(2) Texas	(3)	Johnny Rosenblatt Stadium • Omaha, NE	L 2–12	49–17	1–1
June 6	(6) LSU	(3)	Johnny Rosenblatt Stadium • Omaha, NE	L 3–6	49–18	1–2
