= Peninsula, Ohio =

- Village
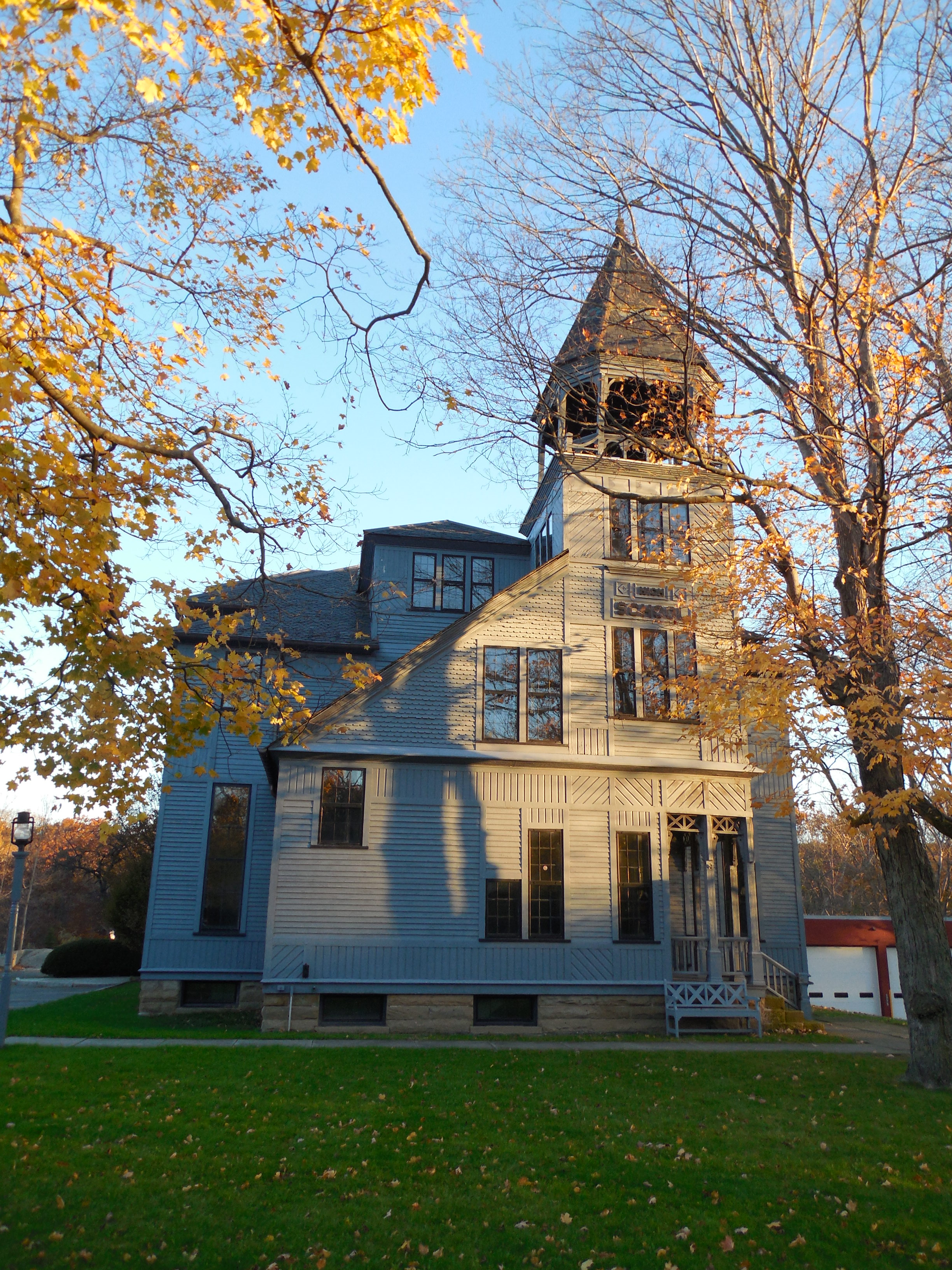
- Boston Township Hall, Peninsula Village Historic District

- Flag

- Location in Summit County and the state of Ohio
- Coordinates: 41°14′32″N 81°32′52″W
- Country: United States
- State: Ohio
- County: Summit

Area
  - Total: 4.42 sq mi (11.44 km^{2})
  - Land: 4.41 sq mi (11.41 km^{2})
  - Water: 0.0077 sq mi (0.02 km^{2})
- Elevation: 748 ft (228 m)

Population (2020)
  - Total: 536
  - Density: 121.6/sq mi (46.96/km^{2})
- Time zone: UTC-5 (Eastern (EST))
  - Summer (DST): UTC-4 (EDT)
- ZIP code: 44264
- Area code: 330
- FIPS code: 39-61574
- GNIS feature ID: 2399650
- Website: villageofpeninsula-oh.gov

Peninsula is a village in northern Summit County, Ohio, United States, along the Cuyahoga River. The population was 536 at the 2020 census. It is part of the Akron metropolitan area. Peninsula is located in the middle of the Cuyahoga Valley National Park. The Boston Mills/Brandywine Ski Resorts are located near Peninsula.

== History ==
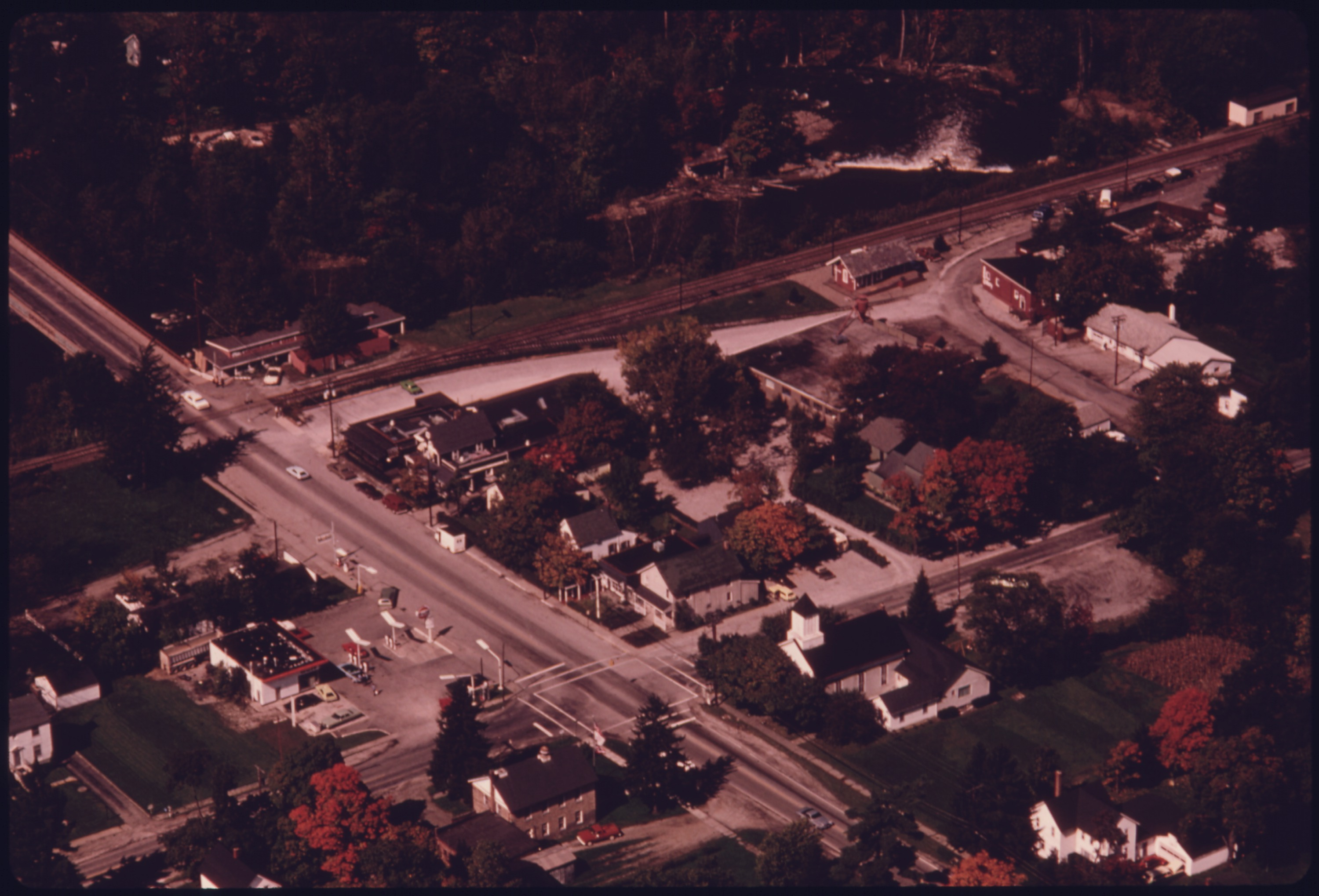
Aerial view of the Main Street, 1975

Initial settlement in Peninsula began in 1818, followed by Herman Bronson officially platting the village in 1837. During its prime canal-era years leading up to 1887, the bustling port served as an active industrial and transit hub, supporting multiple quarries, boatyards, mills, five hotels, and 14 taverns.

The National Register of Historic Places recognizes more than 20 sites across Peninsula. Because many of its early Connecticut Western Reserve inhabitants arrived from New England, the local built environment heavily favors Greek Revival architecture. A prominent local landmark is the Bronson Memorial Church; built in 1835 as Bethel Church, it was originally established to curb what 19th-century historian William Perrin described as the rowdy, illicit behavior common among canal boatmen, before undergoing a Gothic Revival redesign in 1889.

The 1824 Bronson House stands as a prime example of the village's high-style Greek Revival heritage, crafted from local sandstone blocks. Many other surviving residences from the era reflect the upright-and-wing layout—a New England design well-suited to the early Ohio frontier.

Beyond Greek Revival, the village showcases a variety of late 19th-century architecture, including Italianate, Queen Anne, Stick, and Colonial Revival styles. Built in 1886 in the Stick style, the current Cuyahoga Valley Historical Museum originally operated as the local high school and later the Boston Township Hall; the three-story structure is characterized by a hipped roof and an open-belfry pyramidal tower.

== Geography ==
According to the United States Census Bureau, the village has a total area of 4.68 square miles (12.12 km^{2}), of which 4.67 square miles (12.10 km^{2}) is land and 0.01 square miles (0.03 km^{2}) is water.

Boston Mills/Brandywine Ski Resort just north of Peninsula is one of the few skiing locations in Ohio. Peninsula is bordered on the east by Boston Heights. It is a part of Boston Township.

== Demographics ==
Historical population
Census	Pop.	Note	%±
1880	488		—
1890	562		15.2%
1900	579		3.0%
1910	536		−7.4%
1920	520		−3.0%
1930	510		−1.9%
1940	573		12.4%
1950	636		11.0%
1960	644		1.3%
1970	692		7.5%
1980	604		−12.7%
1990	562		−7.0%
2000	602		7.1%
2010	565		−6.1%
2020	536		−5.1%

=== 2010 census ===
As of the census of 2010, there were 565 people, 237 households, and 164 families living in the village. The population density was 121.0 inhabitants per square mile (46.7/km^{2}). There were 261 housing units at an average density of 55.9 per square mile (21.6/km^{2}). The racial makeup of the village was 98.4% White, 0.4% African American, 0.4% Asian, and 0.9% from two or more races. Hispanic or Latino of any race were 0.4% of the population.

There were 237 households, of which 26.2% had children under the age of 18 living with them, 55.3% were married couples living together, 11.0% had a female householder with no husband present, 3.0% had a male householder with no wife present, and 30.8% were non-families. 25.3% of all households were made up of individuals, and 6.7% had someone living alone who was 65 years of age or older. The average household size was 2.38 and the average family size was 2.84.

The median age in the village was 47.3 years. 20.5% of residents were under the age of 18; 5.7% were between the ages of 18 and 24; 19.4% were from 25 to 44; 40.9% were from 45 to 64; and 13.5% were 65 years of age or older. The gender makeup of the village was 49.4% male and 50.6% female.

=== 2000 census ===
As of the census of 2000, there were 602 people, 240 households, and 160 families living in the village. The population density was 128.8 people per square mile (49.8/km^{2}). There were 254 housing units at an average density of 54.3 per square mile (21.0/km^{2}). The racial makeup of the village was 97.84% White, 0.66% African American, 0.33% Asian, 0.17% from other races, and 1.00% from two or more races. Hispanic or Latino of any race were 0.17% of the population.

There were 240 households, out of which 25.0% had children under the age of 18 living with them, 56.3% were married couples living together, 8.3% had a female householder with no husband present, and 33.3% were non-families. 25.0% of all households were made up of individuals, and 7.5% had someone living alone who was 65 years of age or older. The average household size was 2.40 and the average family size was 2.91.

In the village, the population was spread out, with 20.9% under the age of 18, 4.5% from 18 to 24, 29.1% from 25 to 44, 30.7% from 45 to 64, and 14.8% who were 65 years of age or older. The median age was 43 years. For every 100 females, there were 98.7 males. For every 100 females age 18 and over, there were 93.5 males.

The median income for a household in the village was $64,205, and the median income for a family was $73,125. Males had a median income of $48,125 versus $27,188 for females. The per capita income for the village was $29,031. None of the families and 1.2% of the population were living below the poverty line, including no under eighteens and 2.2% of those over 64.

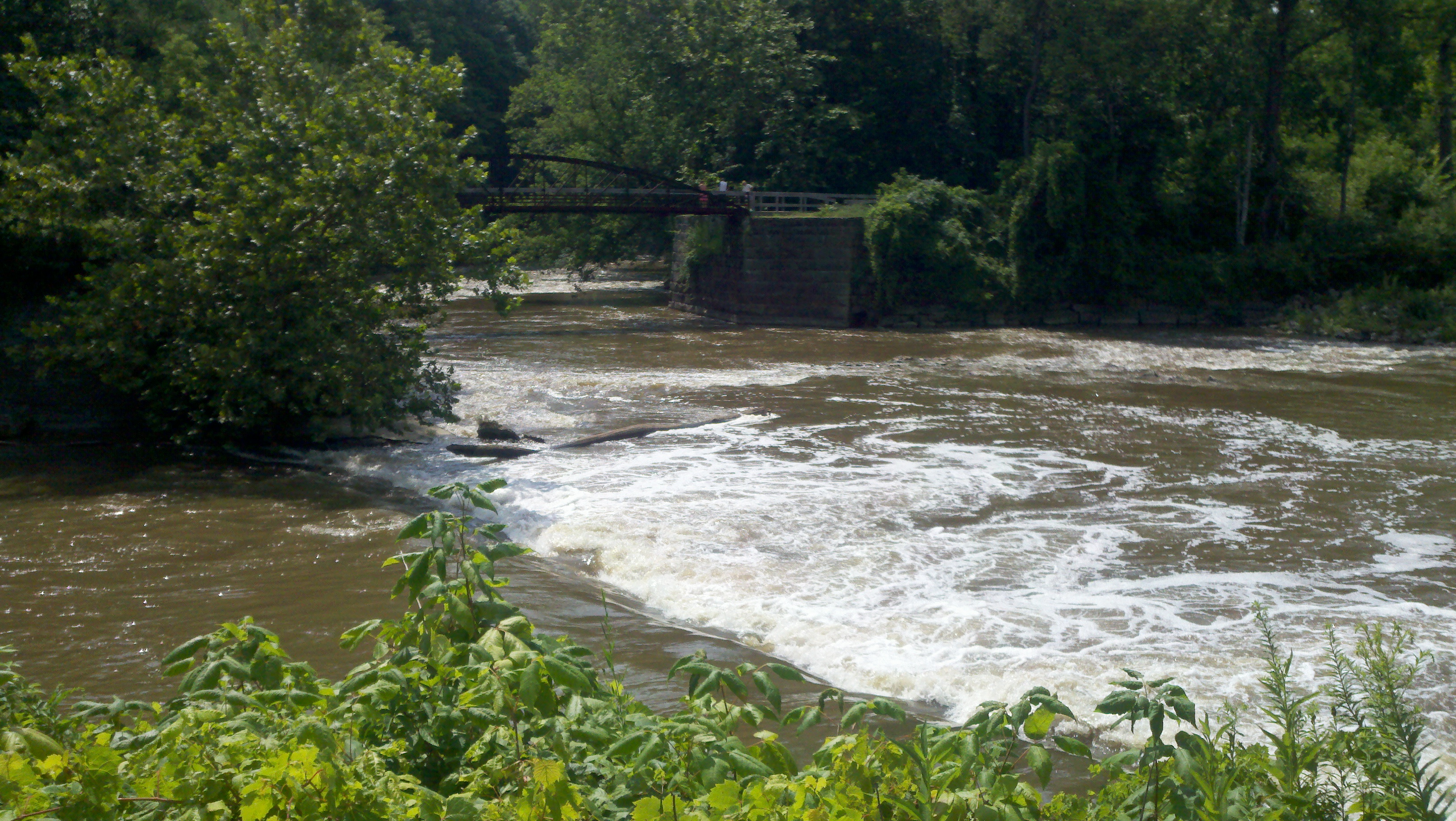
A view of the Ohio and Erie Canal Towpath Bridge from the east in Peninsula

== Education ==
Public schooling is provided by the Woodridge Local School District.

== See also ==
- List of Registered Historic Places in Summit County, Ohio
