= Hudson City School District (Ohio) =

School district in Ohio

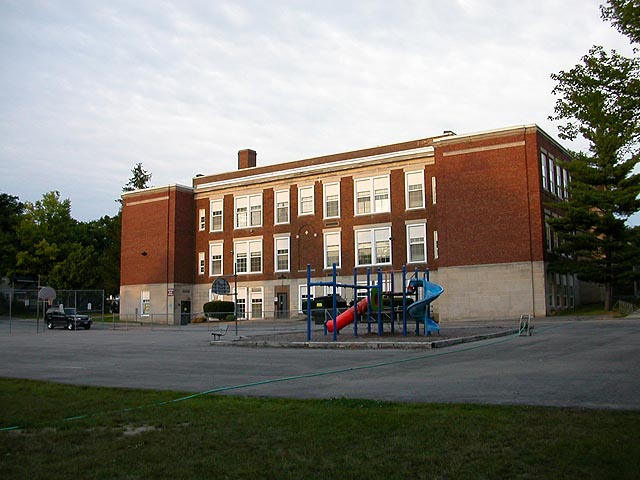
Hudson Elementary, a former school building in the Hudson City School District

The Hudson City School District (HCSD) is a public school district in Summit County, Ohio, United States. It covers most of Hudson, the village of Boston Heights, and some slices of Boston Township and Cuyahoga Falls.

As of 2025, Hudson High School was ranked No. 396th nationally and 11th in the state by U.S. News & World Report.

== Schools ==
The district currently operates the following schools:

- Hudson High School — grades 9-12
  - Principal: Mike Miller
- Hudson Middle School — grades 6-8
  - Principal: Dr. Kimberly Cockley
- East Woods Intermediate School — grades 3-5
  - Principal: Natalie Wininger
- Ellsworth Hill Elementary School — grades 1 & 2
  - Principal: Jen Filomeana
- McDowell Early Learning School — pre-K and kindergarten
  - Principal: Jennifer Hall

=== Previous locations ===
- Hudson Elementary, 34 North Oviatt Street (torn down: 2010)
- Evamere Elementary, 76 North Hayden Parkway (closed: 2021)

== Board of Education ==
=== Current members ===
- Laura Jones (President)
- Mark Dzurec (Vice President)
- Tom Tobin
- Jon C. Peterson
- Kirstin S. Toth

== Administration ==
- Dana Addis (Superintendent)
- Angela Terella (Assistant Superintendent)
- Phillip Butto (Treasurer)
- Tom Barone (Business Manager)
- Kelly Kempf (Pupil Services)
- Lisa Hunt (Human Resources)
- Jennifer Reece (Communications Manager)

== Changes in Hudson City School District ==
- 1919: Hudson Township Rural School District is formed, consisting of the former Hudson Village School District and the township school districts.
- 1998: Hudson Local School District became Hudson City School District.
- 2010: Hudson Elementary is demolished.
- 2018–2022: The Administration and Board of Education begin making changes to multiple schools and facilitates around the Hudson City School District.

== Other facilities ==
- Al Statts Transportation Facility and Koberna Salt Storage Facility opened in June 2019, a bus garage and salt storage facility.
- Lavelli Stadium, built in 1972, named in 1975, when 1941 Hudson High School graduate Dante Lavelli was inducted into the Pro Football Hall of Fame.
- Memorial Stadium, built on Hudson High School (Ohio) property beside the W-wing faculty parking lot.
- Ada Cooper Miller Natatorium, attached to East Woods Intermediate School. Ada Cooper Miller served on the Hudson Board of Education for 40 years, and presided for 25 of those years.

=== Previous locations ===
- Petermann Limited, 91 Owen Brown Street (closed)

== District Enrollment Figures (K-12) ==
1965	1970	1974-75	1980	1985	1990	1995	2000	2005	2010	2015	2019	2020	2023	2026
2,429	2,983	3,553	3,721	3,514	3,880	5,154	5,049	5,421	4,866	4,476	4,517	4,532	4,501	~4,700

== See also ==
- List of school districts in Ohio
