= Woodridge Local School District =

School district in Ohio, United States

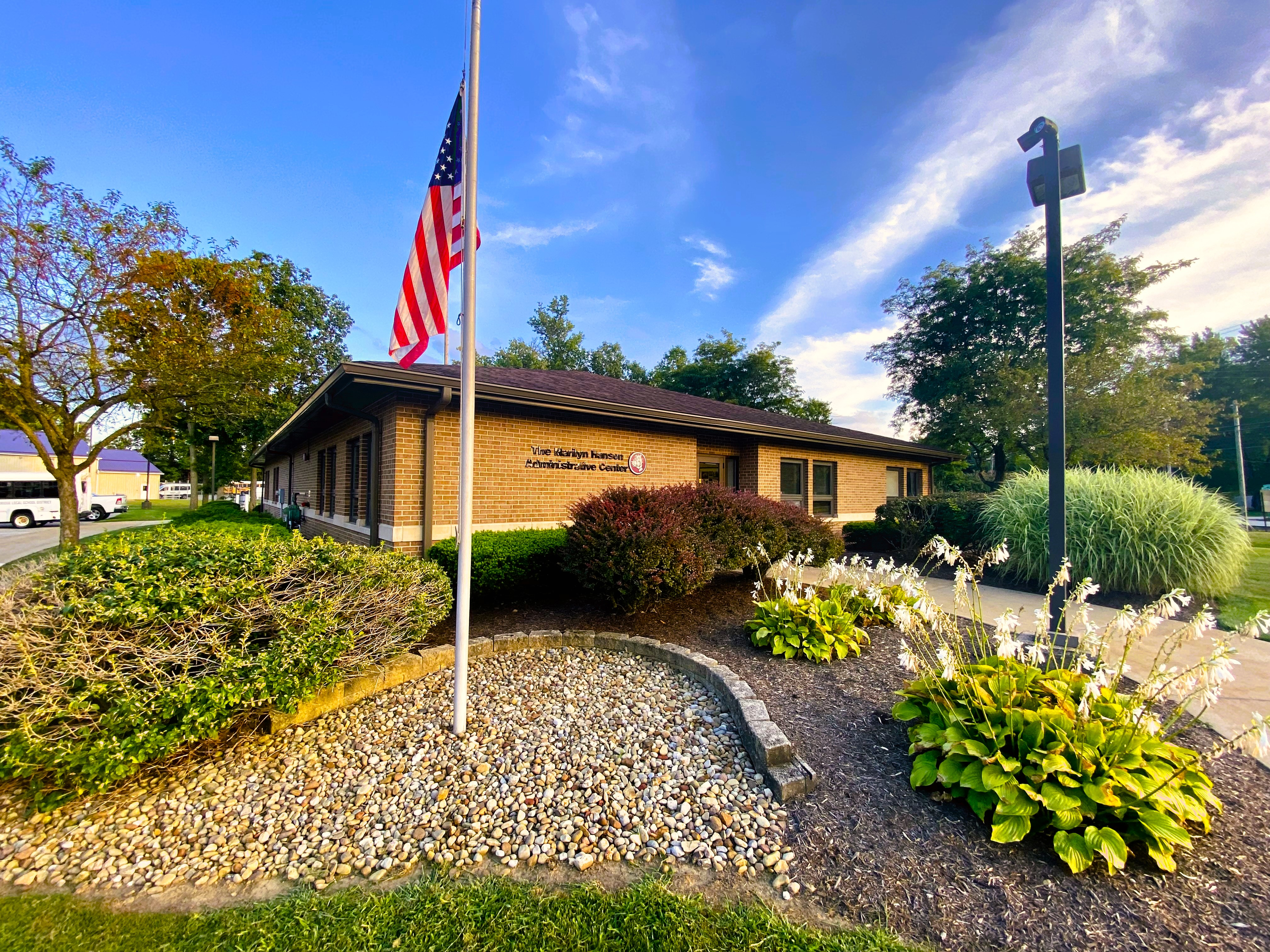

Address
- 4411 Quick Road Peninsula, Ohio, 44264; United States
- Coordinates: 41°11′29″N 81°30′33″W

District information
- Type: Public
- Grades: Pre-K through 12
- Established: 1958
- Superintendent: N'ecole Ast
- Accreditation: Ohio Department of Education
- Schools: 3
- Budget: $35,212,000 (2022–23)
- NCES District ID: 3904997

Students and staff
- Students: 1,983 (2024–25)
- Teachers: 123.10
- Staff: 255.12
- Student–teacher ratio: 16.11
- Athletic conference: Metro Athletic Conference
- District mascot: Bulldogs
- Colors: Maroon, white

Other information
- Website: www.woodridge.us

Woodridge Local School District is a public school district in Northeast Ohio, covering the village of Peninsula and most of Boston Township and parts of Akron, Cuyahoga Falls, Boston Heights, Richfield Township, and Sagamore Hills Township. The district's boundaries are adjacent to and partially within the Cuyahoga Valley National Park. Woodridge was established in 1958 as a result of the merger of the Boston and Northampton Local School Districts and was known as the Boston–Northampton Local School District until 1972. The district operates three school buildings on a central campus in northern Cuyahoga Falls and serves students from preschool through twelfth grade.

== History ==
The district was established in 1958 by the merger of the Boston Local School District, which covered the village of Peninsula and most of Boston Township, and the Northampton Local School District, which covered most of Northampton Township. At the time, Northampton did not have a high school and paid tuition for students to attend neighboring high schools, while Boston Township had the smallest high school in Summit County. The merger was first explored in 1957 after the state reduced the amount it subsidized rural districts for those tuition costs and Northampton voters defeated a bond issue to build a new high school. Boston voters were initially not interested in a merger and Northampton had difficulty finding any neighboring district that could take its high school students. By mid January 1958, after also exploring a merger with the neighboring Stow Local Schools, the Northampton Board of Education pressed for a merger with Boston and the Summit County Board of Education approved it later that month, creating the Boston–Northampton Local School District. The new board of education met for the first time February 18, 1958.

Voters approved a bond issue in May 1959 to construct a new high school in what was then Northampton Township and construction began in January 1961. During the 1960–61 and the first half of the 1961–62 school years, the district rented space at the Cathedral of Tomorrow for elementary students due to overcrowding at Northampton School. Once Woodridge High School opened January 29, 1962, grades seven and eight were all transferred to the former Boston High School in Peninsula, which became Boston–Northampton Junior High School, and Northampton School was made a K–6 elementary school.

The school board approved the name change to Woodridge Local School District in February 1972 and it became official that July. Woodridge was chosen because it was already the name of the high school.

== Administration ==
- Superintendent: N'ecole Ast

== Schools ==
- Woodridge High School
  - Principal: Albert DiTommaso
- Woodridge Middle School
  - Principal: Jesse Hosford
- Woodridge Elementary School
  - Principal: Beth Harrington

== Enrollment ==
| 1965 | 1970 | 1974-75 | 1980 | 1985 | 1990 | 1995 | 2000 | 2005 | 2010 | 2015 | 2019 | 2020 | 2023 |
| 1,679 | 1,853 | 1,735 | 1,298 | 1,008 | 1,019 | 1,192 | 1,688 | 1,757 | 1,936 | 1,988 | 1,867 | 1,880 | 1,928 |
