= Ohio High School Speech League =

Extracurricular organization in Ohio, United States

OHSSL logo

The Ohio High School Speech League (OHSSL) is the body that organizes high school forensic competition in the state of Ohio. The OHSSL provides all of the National Forensic League events, but also provides several other events including Declamation. In the 2001-2002 season, Impromptu Speaking was added as an experimental event. The following year Impromptu was made an official OHSSL event. Following the 2013-2014 season, Impromptu was removed as an OHSSL event. OHSSL also offers many other common events such as debate (Public Forum, Policy, Congress, and Lincoln-Douglas) and IE events such as International and United States Extemporaneous Speaking, Duo Interpretation, Dramatic Interpretation, Humorous Interpretation, Program Oral Interpretation, and Original Oratory. Each of the state districts takes part in a district tournament, called "Littles", where a set number of people can move on to compete in the State Championship.

The Sharen Althoff US Extemp Award is an award given to the US Extemporaneous Speaker who receives the most firsts in rounds for the duration of the tournament.

== History ==
The OHSSL was founded as the Ohio High School Debating League in fall 1927 by the public speaking division of the English Department of Ohio State University. The original membership was composed of 25 high schools, entered by the first director, Glenn Ross. Youngstown East High School won the first state tournament, beating Marietta High School. In 1928, the number of member schools in the Debating League grew to 67 schools, with Hicksville High School winning the state tournament over Ravenna High School.

In 1935, Donald Riley became the director of the League, 88 schools in number at that time. In 1937, new director James Carrell renamed the Ohio High School Debating League to the Ohio High School Speech League, with 145 member schools. The Extempore speech event was also added that year.

In 1939, the membership grew to 165 high schools, and director Walter Emery added four new events: Original Oratory, Oratorical Interpretation, Dramatic Interpretation, and Humorous Interpretation.

== Districts ==
The OHSSL is divided into districts.

- Akron District
- Canton District
- Columbus District
- Cleveland District
- Greater Miami Valley (GMV) District
- Toledo (formerly Tarhe Trails) District
- Youngstown District
