= Cuyahoga Falls City School District =

School district in Ohio

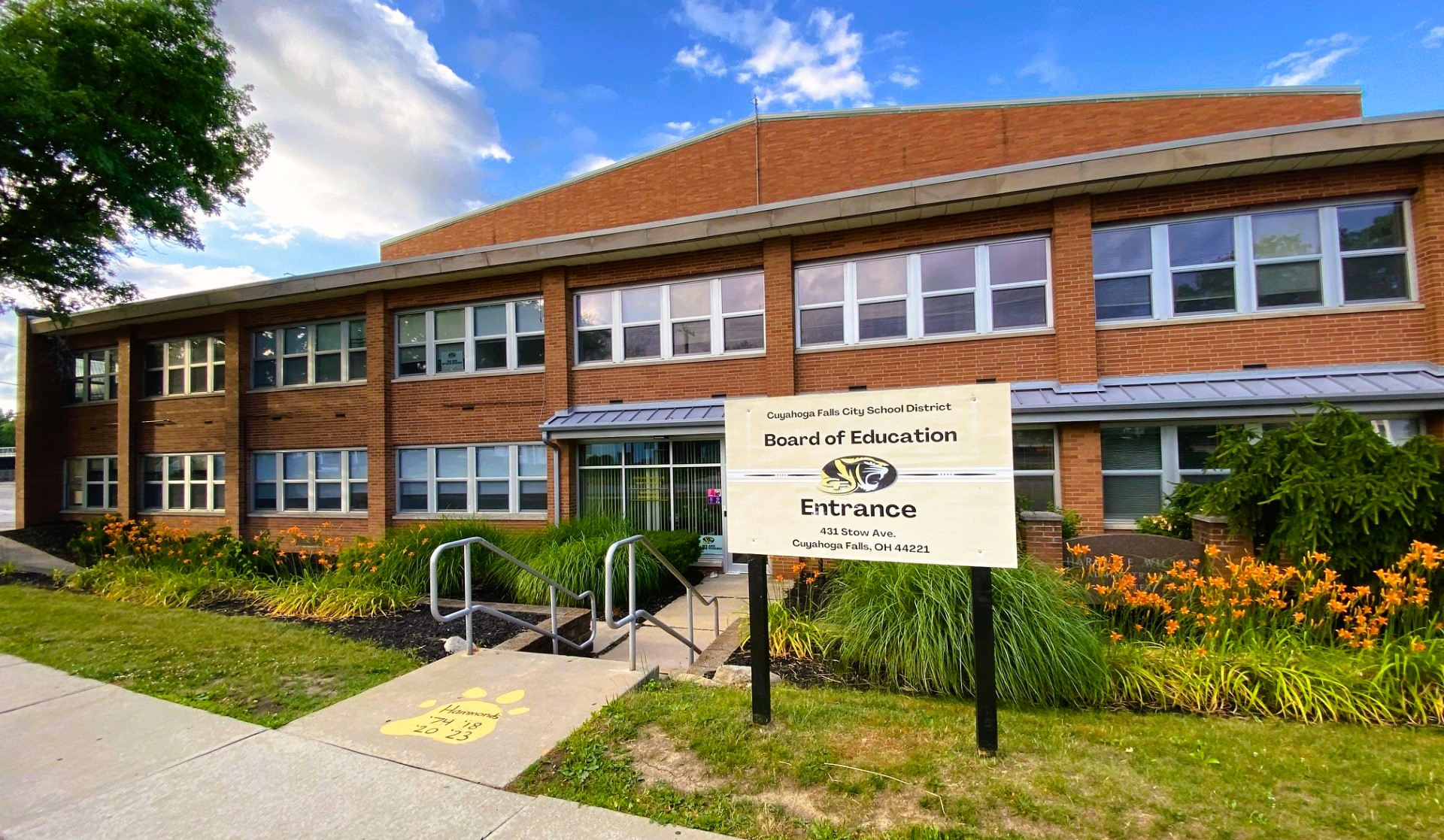

Location
- Cuyahoga Falls, Ohio; United States
- Coordinates: 41°8′44″N 81°29′48″W

District information
- Type: Public
- Grades: K–12
- Superintendent: Andrea Celico
- NCES District ID: 3904383

Students and staff
- Enrollment: 3,848 (2024–25)
- Faculty: 280.00 (on an FTE basis)
- Student–teacher ratio: 14.81

Other information
- Website: www.cfalls.org

The Cuyahoga Falls City School District is a public school district located in Cuyahoga Falls, Ohio, United States.

== History ==
During the COVID-19 pandemic in Ohio the district reduced enforcement of its dress code. Full enforcement returned when the effects of the pandemic declined, although some community members erroneously believed new dress code measures had been introduced.

Andrea Celico became the superintendent in 2022. The district opened the new Cuyahoga Falls 6–12 Campus in January 2026, which consolidated the two remaining middle schools—Bolich and Roberts—into a single Cuyahoga Falls Middle School that shares a building with Cuyahoga Falls High School. The building was formally dedicated in December 2025 and opened for classes in January 2026. The Bolich Middle School building, adjacent to the new 6–12 campus, is scheduled to be razed, while the Roberts Middle School and former Cuyahoga Falls High School buildings will be sold.

== Schools ==
=== High school ===
- Cuyahoga Falls High School

=== Middle school ===
- Cuyahoga Falls Middle School

=== Elementary schools ===
- DeWitt Elementary
- Elizabeth Price Elementary
- Lincoln Elementary
- Preston Elementary
- Richardson Elementary
- Silver Lake Elementary

=== Other ===
- Schnee Learning Center

== District enrollment figures (K-12) ==
1965	1970	1974-75	1980	1985	1990	1995	2000	2005	2010	2015	2019	2020	2023
12,000	11,778	10,382	7,846	6,353	5,919	5,807	5,516	5,294	4,964	4,838	4,604	4,458	4,004
