= Boston Township, Ohio =

Township in Ohio, United States

Boston Township
- Township
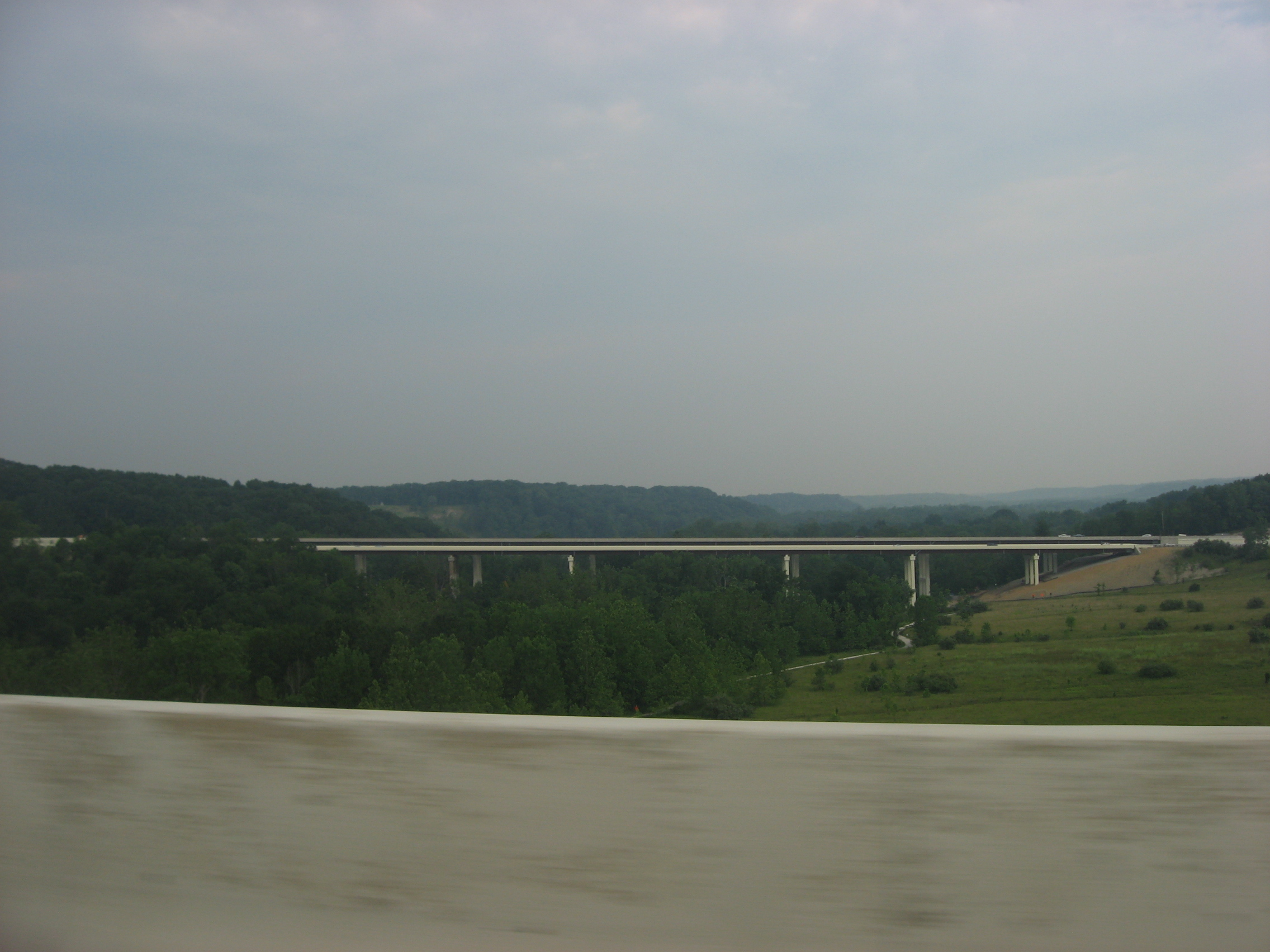
- View of Cuyahoga Valley National Park in northern Boston Township

- Location in Summit County and the state of Ohio.
- Coordinates: 41°14′4″N 81°33′39″W
- Country: United States
- State: Ohio
- County: Summit

Area
  - Total: 19.7 sq mi (51.0 km^{2})
  - Land: 19.6 sq mi (50.8 km^{2})
  - Water: 0.077 sq mi (0.2 km^{2})
- Elevation: 958 ft (292 m)

Population (2020)
  - Total: 1,401
  - Density: 71/sq mi (27.6/km^{2})
- Time zone: UTC-5 (Eastern (EST))
  - Summer (DST): UTC-4 (EDT)
- FIPS code: 39-07776
- GNIS feature ID: 1086996
- Website: Boston Township

Boston Township is one of the nine townships of Summit County, Ohio, United States, about 15 miles (24 km) north of Akron and 23 miles (37 km) south of Cleveland. It is part of the Akron metropolitan area. The 2020 census found 1,401 people in the township.

== Geography ==
Located in the northern part of the county, it borders the following townships and municipalities:

- Sagamore Hills Township - north
- Northfield Center Township - northeast
- Boston Heights - northeast, south of Northfield Center Township
- Hudson - east
- Stow - southeast corner
- Cuyahoga Falls - south
- Bath Township - southwest
- Richfield Township - west
- Brecksville - northwest

Most of the village of Boston Heights occupies a part of what was previously the northeast part of Boston Township. The village of Peninsula, which is still legally part of the township, is in the center. Cuyahoga Falls annexed an area along State Road and Northfield Center has the Brandywine area due to annexation when Northfield Center was part of Northfield Village.

It occupies most of survey Town 4, Range 11 in the Connecticut Western Reserve.

== Name ==
Named by James Stanford after Boston, Massachusetts, it is the only Boston Township statewide.

== History ==
The Hopewell Culture inhabited the area by ~200AD and constructed the Everett Mound near Everett.

Boston Township was established in 1811. Boston Township's land has been in the following counties:

Year	County
1788	Washington
1797	Jefferson
1800	Trumbull
1808	Portage
1840	Summit

== Government ==
The township is governed by a three-member board of trustees, who are elected in November of odd-numbered years to a four-year term beginning on the following January 1. Two are elected in the year after the presidential election and one is elected in the year before it. There is also an elected township fiscal officer, who serves a four-year term beginning on April 1 of the year after the election, which is held in November of the year before the presidential election. Vacancies in the fiscal officership or on the board of trustees are filled by the remaining trustees.

== Transportation ==
=== Highways ===
Boston Township is served by Interstate 271, which has an exit onto State Route 303 at the border with Richfield Township, and by State Route 303, which goes east–west through the middle of the township. The Ohio Turnpike (Interstate 80) passes through the township without any exits.

== Education ==
Schooling for the township is provided by Woodridge Local School District.
