= Stow–Munroe Falls City School District =

School district in Ohio, United States

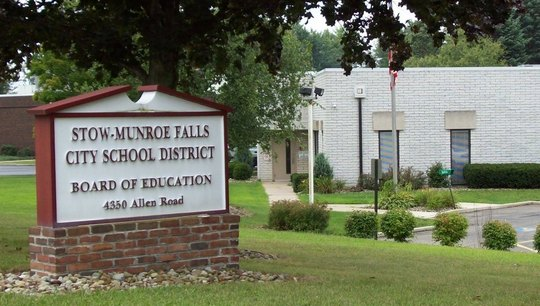

Address
- 4350 Allen Road Stow, Ohio, 44224; United States

District information
- Type: Public
- Grades: Pre-K through 12
- Superintendent: Felisha Gould
- NCES District ID: 3904483

Students and staff
- Students: 4,926 (2025–2026)
- Teachers: 270.00 (on an FTE basis) (2025–2026)
- Staff: 640.36 (on an FTE basis) (2025–2026)
- Student–teacher ratio: 18.24 (2025–2026)

Other information
- Website: www.smfschools.org

The Stow–Munroe Falls City School District (SMFCSD) is a public school district with administrative offices in Stow, Ohio. Located in eastern Summit County, the district serves approximately 5,000 students primarily from the cities of Stow and Munroe Falls, but also from neighboring portions of Cuyahoga Falls, Franklin Township, Hudson, and Tallmadge. With a staff of more than 600, SMFCSD operates eleven facilities: its own central office, a bus garage, six elementary schools, one intermediate school, one middle school and one high school. Since 2024, Felisha Gould has served as superintendent.

== Budget ==
As of 2015, the Stow–Munroe Falls School District has a budget surplus of over $25 million. The five-year financial forecast beginning in the fiscal year 2015 and ending in the fiscal year 2017 also assumes 2% salary increases for staff each year from 2014 through 2017 as well as 2% increases for other expenditures, although the forecast does not include certain annual revenues as per its conservative revenue assumptions. As of 2013, the total district yearly revenue was over $56,000,000. Salaries and employee benefits accounted for 97.1% of the budget.

== Schools ==
School	Grades	Address	Photo
Stow–Munroe Falls High School	9–12	3227 E. Graham Rd., Stow, OH 44224	
Kimpton Middle School	7–8	380 N. River Rd., Munroe Falls, OH 44262	
Lakeview Intermediate School	5–6	1819 Graham Rd., Stow, OH 44224	
Echo Hills Elementary School	K–4	4405 Stow Rd., Stow, OH 44224	
Fishcreek Elementary School	K–4	5080 Fishcreek Rd., Stow, OH 44224	
Highland Elementary School	K–4	1843 Graham Rd., Stow, OH 44224	
Riverview Elementary School	K–4	240 N. River Rd., Munroe Falls, OH 44262	
Woodland Elementary School	K–4	2908 Graham Rd., Stow, OH 44224	
Indian Trail Elementary School	Pre K – 4	3512 Kent Rd., Stow, OH 44224	

== District enrollment figures (K–12) ==
District Enrollment Figures (K–12)
1965	1970	1974–75	1980	1985	1990	1995	2000	2005	2010	2015	2019	2020	2023
5,048	6,650	6,712	5,971	5,252	5,507	5,938	5,926	5,998	5,695	5,215	5,265	5,280	5,081

== See also ==
- List of school districts in Ohio
- Ohio Department of Education
