= Boston Heights, Ohio =

- Village
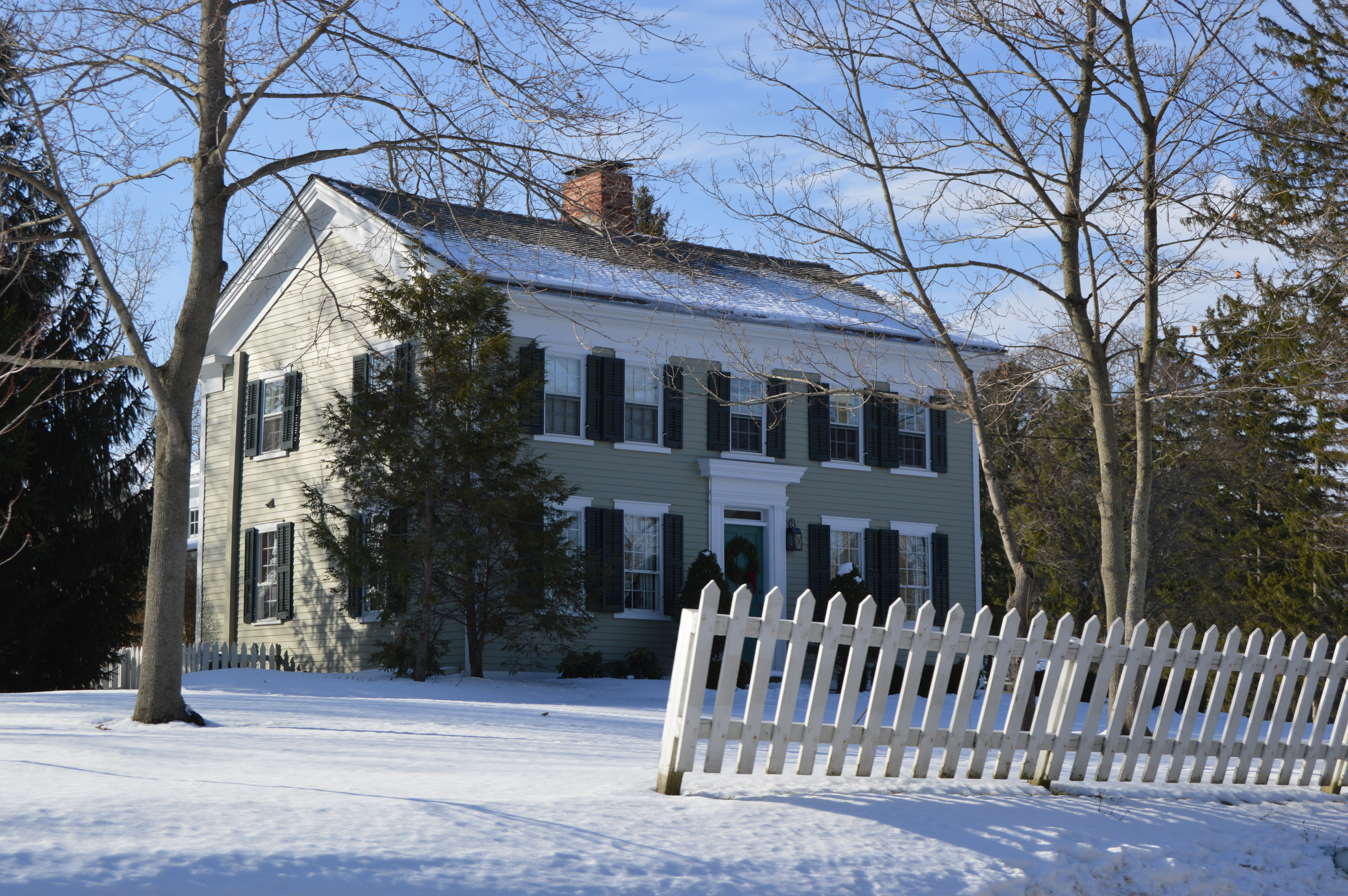
- The Luther B. Ranney Farmhouse, a historic site in the village

- Location in Summit County and the state of Ohio
- Coordinates: 41°15′12″N 81°30′06″W
- Country: United States
- State: Ohio
- County: Summit

Area
  - Total: 6.99 sq mi (18.11 km^{2})
  - Land: 6.99 sq mi (18.11 km^{2})
  - Water: 0 sq mi (0.00 km^{2})
- Elevation: 1,073 ft (327 m)

Population (2020)
  - Total: 1,402
  - Estimate (2023): 1,395
  - Density: 200.5/sq mi (77.42/km^{2})
- Time zone: UTC-5 (Eastern (EST))
  - Summer (DST): UTC-4 (EDT)
- FIPS code: 39-07790
- GNIS feature ID: 1086997
- Website: villageofbostonheights.com

Boston Heights is a village in northern Summit County, Ohio, United States. The population was 1,402 at the 2020 census. It is part of the Akron metropolitan area. Boston Heights is home to the headquarters of Arhaus, a major home furnishings retailer.

== History ==
In 1924, Boston Heights incorporated as a village and withdrew from Boston Township by forming a paper township named Boston Heights Township. In 1965, a motel owner within the village sought a liquor license from the Ohio Liquor Control Board that was only available in unincorporated areas of Summit County. As a workaround, he convinced the village council to temporarily detach his property from the village, forming an enclave of Boston Heights Township long enough to obtain the license before being reannexed. As of year later, the village had yet to reannex the property; the motel owner was the only resident in Ohio without a local government, creating confusion at the village, county, and state level.

== Geography ==
According to the United States Census Bureau, the village has a total area of 6.99 square miles (18.10 km^{2}), all land.

== Demographics ==
Historical population
Census	Pop.	Note	%±
1880	130		—
1930	309		—
1940	369		19.4%
1950	646		75.1%
1960	831		28.6%
1970	846		1.8%
1980	781		−7.7%
1990	733		−6.1%
2000	1,186		61.8%
2010	1,300		9.6%
2020	1,402		7.8%
2023 (est.)	1,395	▼	−0.5%
U.S. Decennial Census

=== 2010 census ===
As of the census of 2010, there were 1,300 people, 463 households, and 382 families living in the village. The population density was 188.4 inhabitants per square mile (72.7/km^{2}). There were 493 housing units at an average density of 71.4 per square mile (27.6/km^{2}). The racial makeup of the village was 95.9% White, 2.1% African American, 0.1% Native American, 0.7% Asian, and 1.2% from two or more races. Hispanic or Latino of any race were 0.8% of the population.

There were 463 households, of which 36.5% had children under the age of 18 living with them, 72.4% were married couples living together, 6.9% had a female householder with no husband present, 3.2% had a male householder with no wife present, and 17.5% were non-families. 14.5% of all households were made up of individuals, and 4.5% had someone living alone who was 65 years of age or older. The average household size was 2.81 and the average family size was 3.11.

The median age in the village was 44.4 years. 26.1% of residents were under the age of 18; 6.1% were between the ages of 18 and 24; 19.2% were from 25 to 44; 36.7% were from 45 to 64; and 12.1% were 65 years of age or older. The gender makeup of the village was 48.8% male and 51.2% female.

=== 2000 census ===
As of the census of 2000, there were 1,186 people, 392 households, and 323 families living in the village. The population density was 171.9 inhabitants per square mile (66.4/km^{2}). There were 407 housing units at an average density of 59.0 per square mile (22.8/km^{2}). The racial makeup of the village was 96.71% White, 0.59% African American, 1.52% Asian, 0.42% from other races, and 0.76% from two or more races. Hispanic or Latino of any race were 1.10% of the population.

There were 392 households, out of which 46.9% had children under the age of 18 living with them, 75.3% were married couples living together, 4.3% had a female householder with no husband present, and 17.6% were non-families. 14.5% of all households were made up of individuals, and 6.6% had someone living alone who was 65 years of age or older. The average household size was 3.03 and the average family size was 3.38.

In the village, the population was spread out, with 32.2% under the age of 18, 5.1% from 18 to 24, 32.0% from 25 to 44, 23.0% from 45 to 64, and 7.6% who were 65 years of age or older. The median age was 37 years. For every 100 females there were 103.1 males. For every 100 females age 18 and over, there were 100.5 males.

The median income for a household in the village was $80,884, and the median income for a family was $87,925. Males had a median income of $63,125 versus $40,000 for females. The per capita income for the village was $36,960. About 0.3% of families and 1.6% of the population were below the poverty line, including none of those under age 18 and 6.3% of those age 65 or over.
