= Akron metropolitan area =

Coordinates: 41°04′N 81°31′W

Greater Akron
- Metropolitan Statistical Area
- Akron, OH Metropolitan Statistical Area
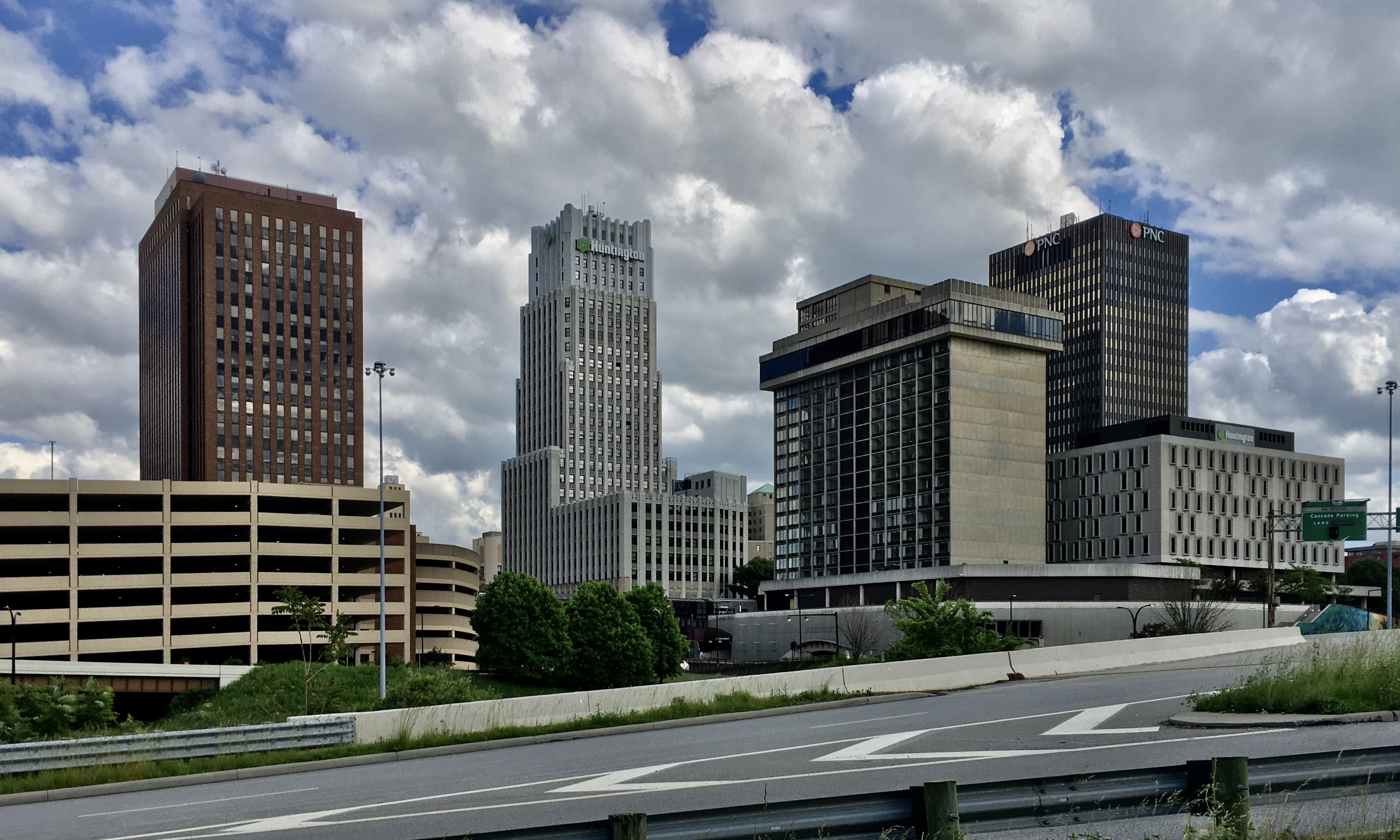
- View of the Akron skyline from the west looking east
Interactive Map of Akron, OH MSA
City of Akron
Akron, OH MSA
Other Counties in the Cleveland, OH CSA
- Country: United States
- State: Ohio
- Largest city: Akron
- Other cities: List: In MSA: Barberton; Cuyahoga Falls; Green; Kent; Stow

Population (2020)
  - MSA: 702,219 (72nd)
  - CSA: 3,633,962 (17th)
- MSA/CSA = 2020

GDP
  - MSA: $44.562 billion (2022)
- Time zone: UTC−5 (EST)
  - Summer (DST): UTC−4 (EDT)
- Area codes: 330, 234

The Akron, OH Metropolitan Statistical Area, sometimes referred to as Greater Akron, is defined by the United States Office of Management and Budget as an area consisting of two counties, Summit and Portage, in Northeast Ohio and anchored by the city of Akron. As of the 2020 census, the MSA had a population of 702,219. The Akron MSA is also part of the larger Cleveland–Akron–Canton, OH Combined Statistical Area, which has a population of 3,633,962 people as of the 2020 census, the largest metropolitan area in Ohio.

Historically, Greater Akron was known as the center of the United States' tire and rubber industry throughout the 20th century, and today one major tire company (Goodyear Tire and Rubber) still is based there. More recently, the area has become a center of polymer science research and manufacturing for the country, and is home to five Fortune 1000 corporations.

== Communities ==
=== Places with more than 100,000 inhabitants ===
- Akron (principal city) – 190,469

=== Places with 25,000 to 100,000 inhabitants ===
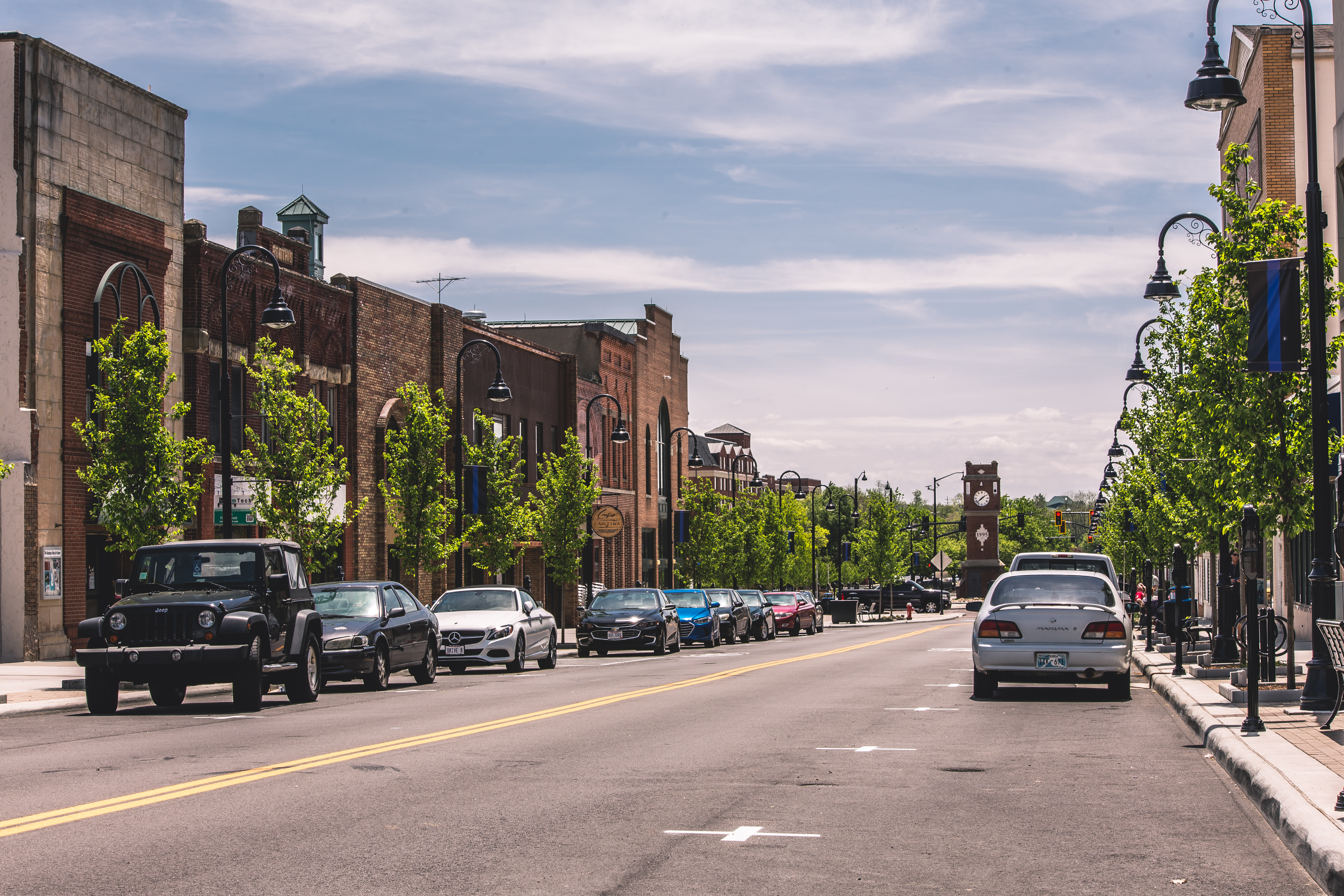
Cuyahoga Falls is the second largest city in Greater Akron.

- Cuyahoga Falls – 51,114
- Stow – 34,483
- Kent – 28,215
- Green – 27,475
- Barberton – 25,191

=== Places with 10,000 to 25,000 inhabitants ===
- Aurora – 17,239
- Brimfield Township – 10,376
- Copley Township – 17,304
- Coventry Township – 10,945
- Hudson – 22,262
- Macedonia – 11,188
- New Franklin – 14,227
- Norton – 12,081
- Portage Lakes (census-designated place)
- Ravenna – 11,724
- Sagamore Hills Township – 10,947
- Springfield Township – 14,644
- Streetsboro – 16,028
- Tallmadge – 17,257
- Twinsburg – 18,795

=== Places with 5,000 to 10,000 inhabitants ===
- Bath Township – 9,702
- Fairlawn – 7,437
- Franklin Township – 6,283
- Montrose-Ghent (CDP)
- Munroe Falls – 5,012
- Northfield Center Township – 5,839
- Randolph Township – 5,298
- Ravenna Township – 9,209
- Richfield Township – 6,165
- Rootstown Township – 8,225
- Shalersville Township – 5,670
- Suffield Township – 6,311

=== Places with 1,000 to 5,000 inhabitants ===
- Atwater Township – 2,740
- Boston Heights – 1,300
- Boston Township – 1,272
- Brady Lake (CDP)
- Brimfield (CDP)
- Charlestown Township – 1,799
- Clinton – 1,214
- Deerfield Township – 2,822
- Edinburg Township – 2,586
- Freedom Township – 2,843
- Garrettsville – 2,325
- Hiram – 1,406
- Hiram Township – 2,411
- Lakemore – 3,068
- Mantua – 1,043
- Mantua Township – 4,811
- Mogadore – 2,846
- Nelson Township – 3,148
- Palmyra Township – 2,919
- Northfield – 3,677
- Paris Township – 1,744
- Reminderville – 3,404
- Richfield
- Silver Lake – 2,519
- Twinsburg Township – 2,828
- Windham – 2,209
- Windham Township 1,865

=== Places with less than 1,000 inhabitants ===
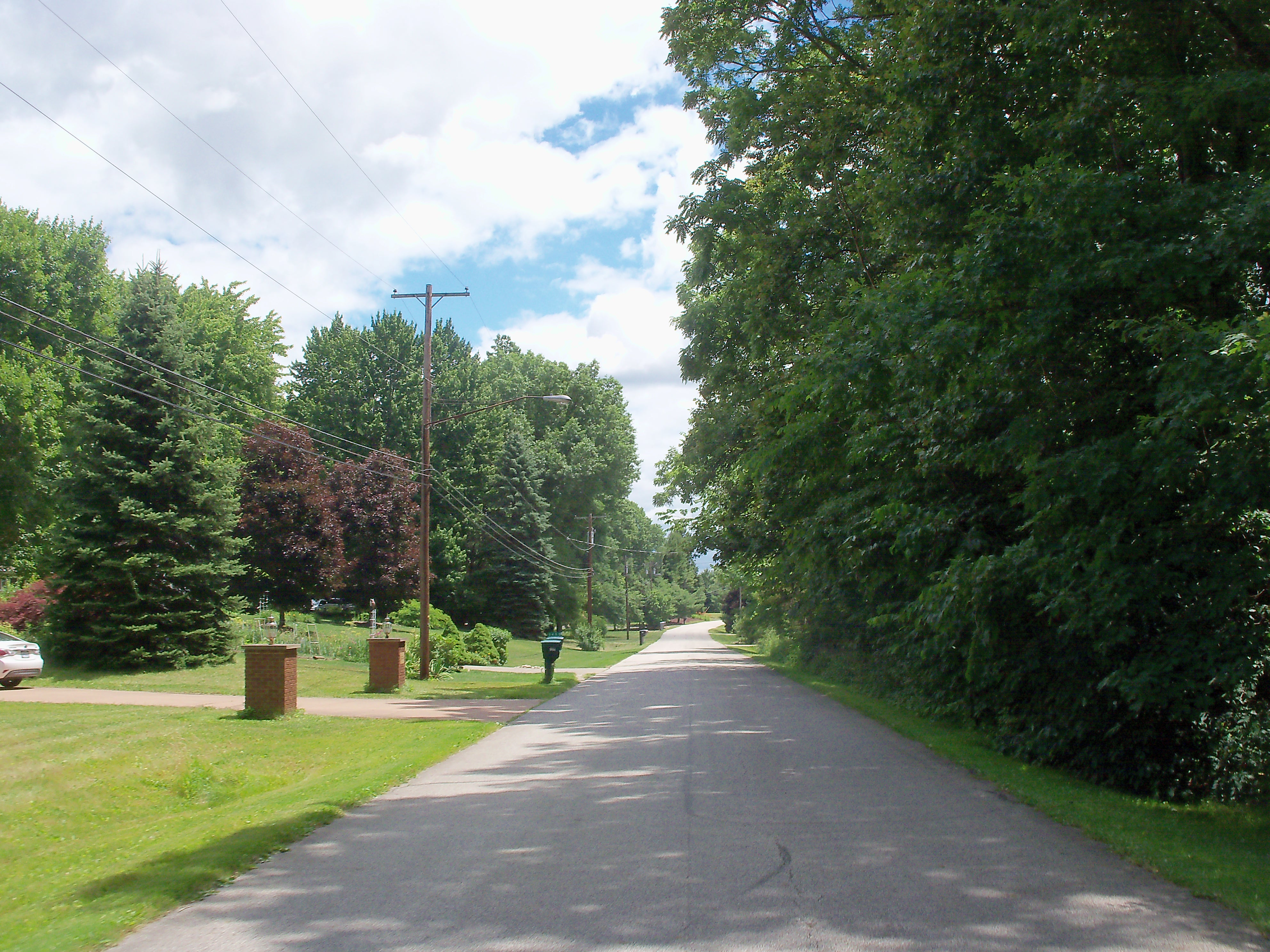
Sugar Bush Knolls has the highest median household income of any incorporated place in Greater Akron.

- Atwater (CDP)
- Peninsula - 565
- Pigeon Creek (CDP)
- Sugar Bush Knolls – 177
- Suffield (CDP)

=== Unincorporated places ===
- Diamond
- Ghent
- Hammond's Corners
- Montrose
- Wayland

== Demographics ==
Historical population
Census	Pop.	Note	%±
1900	100,961		—
1910	138,560		37.2%
1920	322,434		132.7%
1930	386,813		20.0%
1940	386,065		−0.2%
1950	474,016		22.8%
1960	605,367		27.7%
1970	679,239		12.2%
1980	660,328		−2.8%
1990	657,575		−0.4%
2000	694,960		5.7%
2010	703,200		1.2%
2020	702,219		−0.1%
2025 (est.)	701,780		−0.1%

As of the census of 2010, there were 703,200 people, 279,518 households, and 181,540 families residing within the MSA. The racial makeup of the MSA was 84.8% White, 11.9% African American, 0.20% Native American, 1.8% Asian, 0% Pacific Islander, 0.26% from other races, and 1.34% from two or more races. Hispanic or Latino of any race were 1.2% of the population. 3.4% of the population were reported as foreign born, and 5.4% reported speaking a language other than English as the primary language in the home. In the MSA the population was spread out, with 18.7% the age of 14 or under, 14.4% from 15 to 24, 25.7% from 25 to 44, 27.6% from 45 to 64, and 13.5% who were 65 years of age or older. For every 100 females, there were 94.1 males.

The median family income in 2007 dollars in the MSA was $61,537, and the median household income in the MSA was $47,336. Males had a median income of $38,776 versus $26,532 for females. The per capita income for the MSA was $36,564 in 2007 dollars.

County	Seat	2025 estimate	2020 Census	Change	Area	Density
Portage	Ravenna	163,404	161,791	+1.00%	504 sq mi (1,310 km^{2})	324/sq mi (125/km^{2})
Summit	Akron	538,376	540,428	−0.38%	419 sq mi (1,090 km^{2})	1,285/sq mi (496/km^{2})
Total		701,780	702,219	−0.06%	923 sq mi (2,390 km^{2})	760/sq mi (294/km^{2})

== Economy ==
As of November 2024, the Akron metropolitan area serves as the corporate headquarters of 3 Fortune 1000 firms (shown with November 2024 rankings below):

- (#204) Goodyear Tire and Rubber Company (Akron, rubber)
- (#331) FirstEnergy (Akron, utilities)
- (#779) Diebold Nixdorf (Green, electronics)

Other large employers include:

- Acme Fresh Market (Akron, grocery chain)
- Advanced Elastomer Systems (Akron, polymers)
- Babcock & Wilcox (Barberton, engineering)
- Bridgestone Corporation (Akron, rubber)
- Davey Tree Expert Company (Kent, tree and lawn care)
- East Manufacturing Corp (Randolph Township, manufacturing)
- FedEx Corporation (Green, logistics)
- FirstMerit (Akron, banking)
- GE Lighting (Ravenna, manufacturing)
- Gojo Industries (Akron, chemicals)
- Hiram College (Hiram, higher education)
- Huntington Bancshares (Multiple Sites in MSA, banking)
- InfoCision Management Corporation (Bath Township, teleservice)
- JPMorgan Chase Bank (Multiple Sites in MSA, banking)
- Kent State University (Kent, higher education)
- KeyBank (Multiple Sites in MSA, banking)
- Little Tikes (Hudson, children's toys)
- Lockheed Martin (Akron, aerospace/defense/security)
- McMaster-Carr (Aurora, maintenance/repair/operations)
- Myers Industries (Akron, polymers)
- PNC Financial Services (Multiple Sites in MSA, banking)
- PPG Industries (Barberton, chemicals)
- Roadway Express (Akron, logistics)
- Saint-Gobain (Multiple Sites in MSA, polymers/aerospace)
- Sterling Jewelers (Akron, specialty jewelry)
- Step2 Corporation (Streetsboro, children's toys)
- Summa Health System (Akron, health care)
- Summit Racing Equipment (Tallmadge, racing equipment)
- Time Warner Cable (Akron, cable television)
- University of Akron (Akron, higher education)

== Transportation ==
=== Airports ===
The Akron metropolitan area is served by the following international, regional and county airports:

- Akron–Canton Regional Airport (Green)
- Akron Fulton International Airport (Akron)
- Kent State University Airport (Stow)
- Portage County Regional Airport (Shalersville Township)

=== Highways ===
- Interstate 76
- Interstate 77
- Interstate 80 (Ohio Turnpike)
- Interstate 271
- Interstate 277
- Interstate 480
- U.S. Route 224
- U.S. Route 422
- Ohio State Route 5
- Ohio State Route 8
- Ohio State Route 14
- Ohio State Route 18
- Ohio State Route 21
- Ohio State Route 43
- Ohio State Route 44
- Ohio State Route 59
- Ohio State Route 82
- Ohio State Route 88
- Ohio State Route 91
- Ohio State Route 93
- Ohio State Route 162
- Ohio State Route 183
- Ohio State Route 225
- Ohio State Route 241
- Ohio State Route 261
- Ohio State Route 282
- Ohio State Route 303
- Ohio State Route 305
- Ohio State Route 306
- Ohio State Route 532
- Ohio State Route 619
- Ohio State Route 700

=== Public transit ===
In Summit County, public transportation is available through the METRO Regional Transit Authority system, which has a fleet of over two hundred buses and trolleys and operates local routes as well as running commuter buses into downtown Cleveland. The Portage Area Regional Transportation Authority (PARTA) operates throughout Portage County and also runs an express route connecting the downtown Akron and University of Akron with Kent State University, as well as an express route from Kent via Streetsboro to Cleveland. The two systems have transfer points with each other in Stow and Brimfield Township.

== Education ==
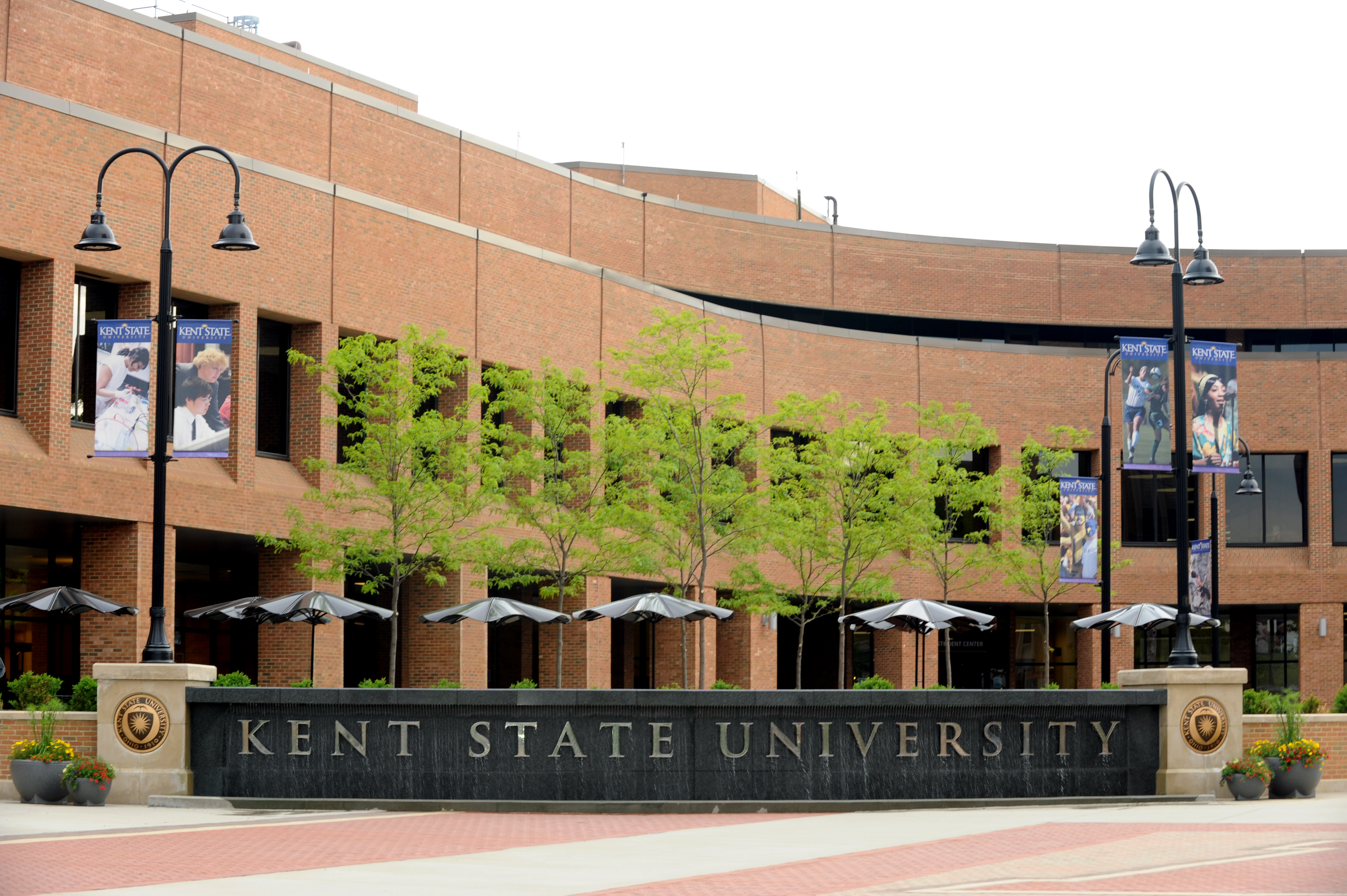
The Kent Student Center at Kent State University.

- University of Akron, located in Akron; a large regional public research university with about 15,000 students. It serves as Summit County's largest university and one of the largest employers.
- Kent State University, located in Kent; a large regional public research university with about 35,000 students. It serves as Portage County's largest university and employer.
- Hiram College, located in Hiram in northwestern Portage County; a small liberal arts college of around 1,200 students.
- The Northeast Ohio Medical University (NEOMED), located in Rootstown, in the south-central part of the county. It serves students from Kent State University, the University of Akron, Youngstown State University, and Cleveland State University.

== Media ==
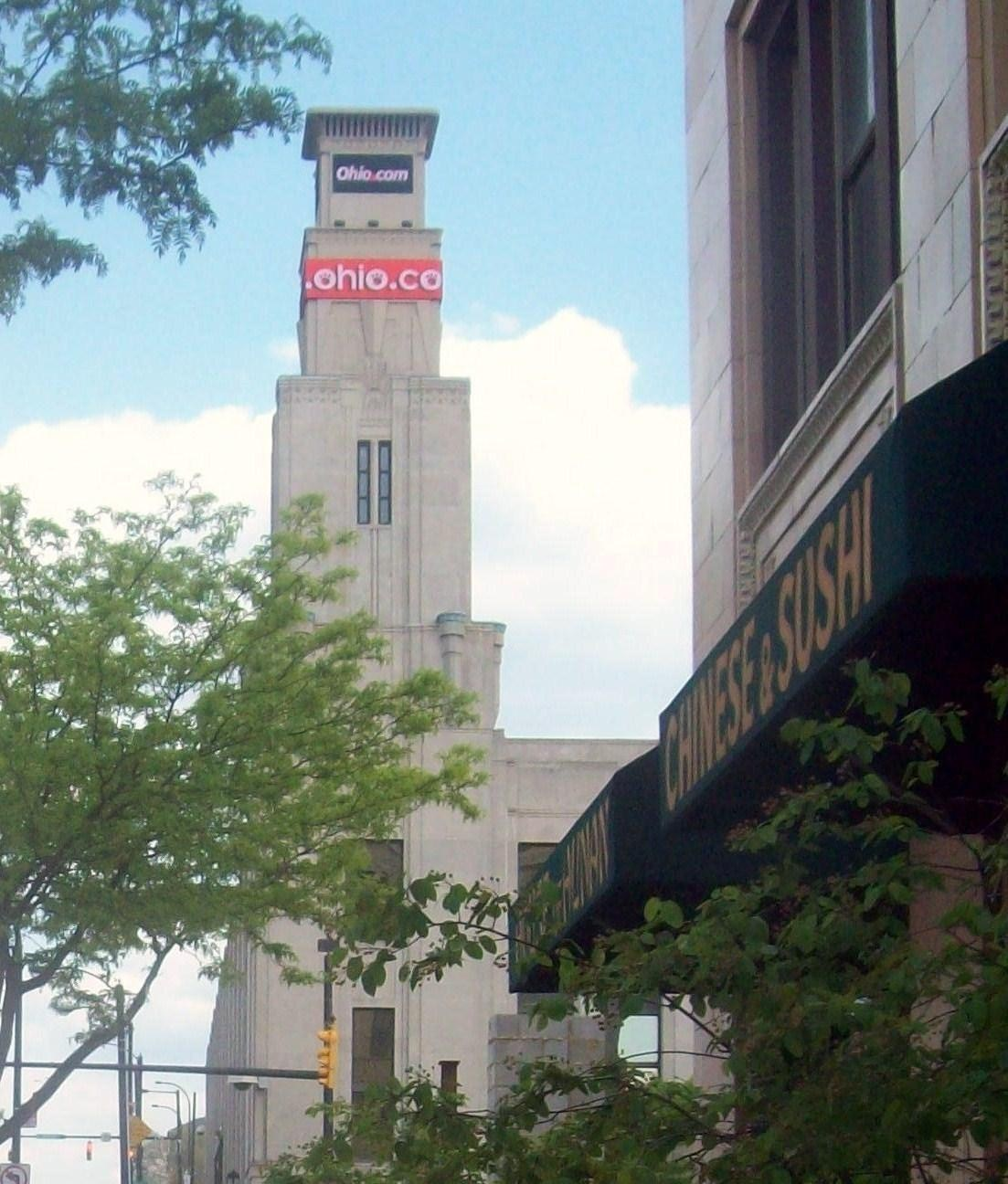
Akron Beacon Journal headquarters

=== Print ===
The Akron area is served in print by the daily Akron Beacon Journal, formerly the flagship newspaper of the Knight Newspapers chain; the weekly "The Akron Reporter"; and the weekly West Side Leader newspapers and the monthly magazine Akron Life. The Buchtelite newspaper is published by the University of Akron.

=== TV ===
Akron is part of the Cleveland-Akron-Canton TV market, the 18th largest market in the U.S. Within the market, WEAO (PBS), WVPX (ION), and WBNX-TV (The CW) are licensed to Akron. However, while WEAO serves the city of Akron specifically, WBNX and WVPX identify themselves as Akron/Cleveland, serving the entire market. Akron has no native news broadcast, having lost its only news station when the former WAKC became WVPX in 1996. WVPX and Cleveland's WKYC later provided a joint news program, which was cancelled in 2005.

=== Radio ===
While part of a combined TV market with Cleveland, the Akron area is its own radio market, and served by WZIP 88.1 (Top 40 – University of Akron), WSTB 88.9 (alternative), WKSU 89.7 (public radio), WAPS 91.3 (album adult alternative), WKJA 91.9 (religious), WQMX 94.9 (country), WONE 97.5 (classic rock), WKDD 98.1 (contemporary hits), WNIR-FM 100.1 (news/talk), WHLO 640 (news/talk), WCUE 1150 (religious), and WAKR 1590/93.5 (soft adult contemporary/full service).

== Culture ==
=== Theaters and concert venues ===
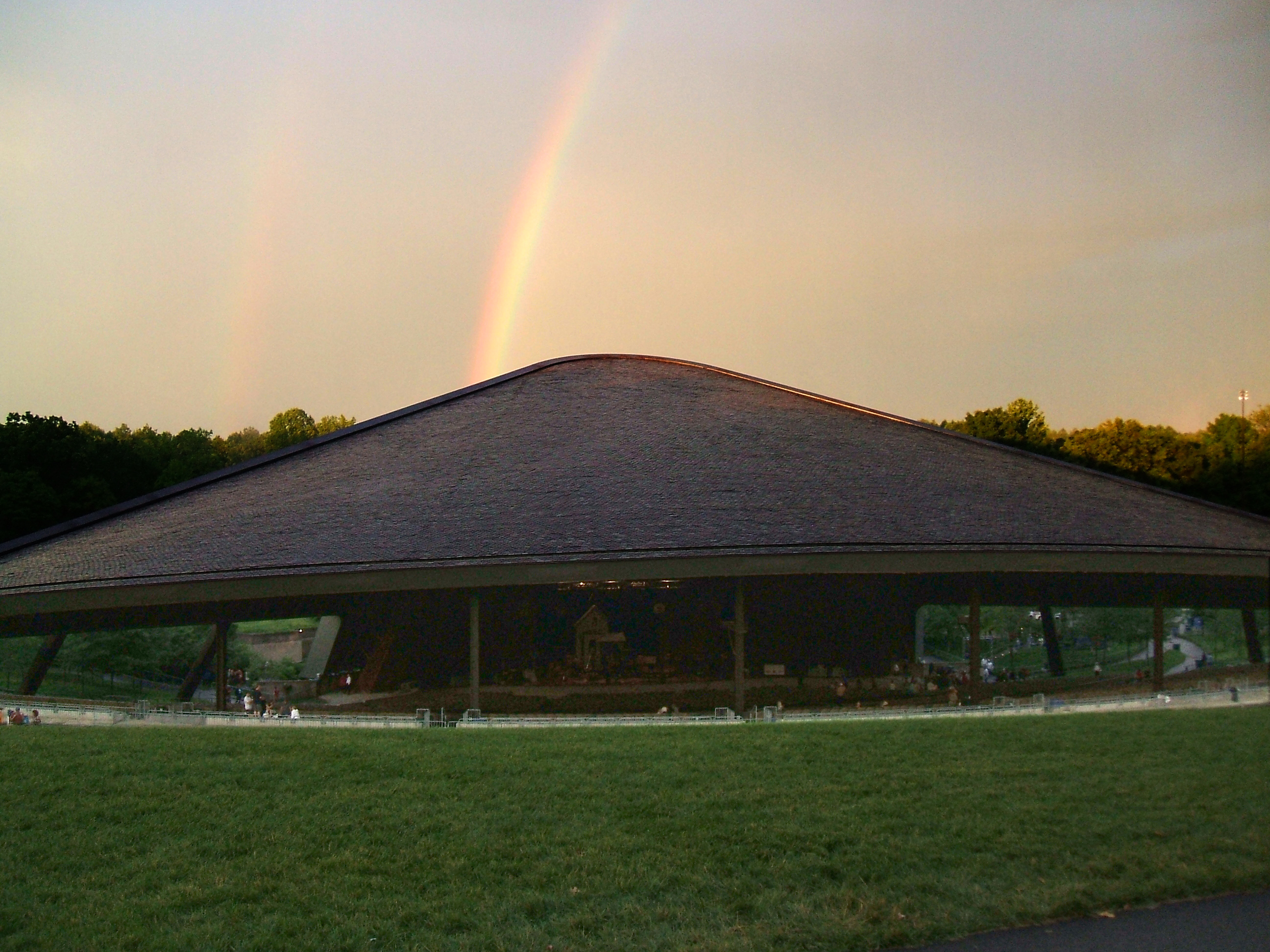
The Blossom Music Center in Cuyahoga Falls.

- Actors' Summit (Akron)
- Akron Civic Theater (Akron)
- ANTIC Theatre (Cuyahoga Falls)
- Aurora Community Theatre (Aurora)
- Blossom Music Center (Cuyahoga Falls)
- E. J. Thomas Hall (Akron)
- Highland Theater (Akron)
- Kent Stage (Kent)
- Lock 3 (Akron)
- Magical Theatre (Barberton)
- Musica (Akron)
- Porthouse Theatre (Cuyahoga Falls))
- Weathervane Playhouse (Akron)

=== Museums and historic landmarks ===
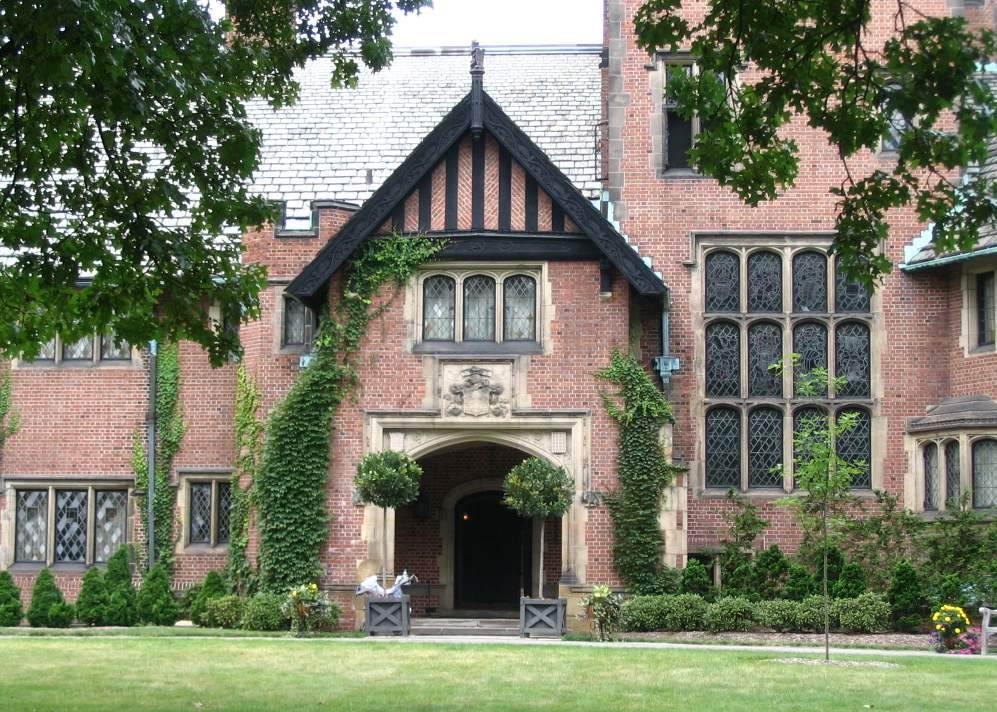
The entrance to the Stan Hywet Hall and Gardens, Akron.

- Akron Art Museum (Akron)
- Aurora Historical Society Museum (Aurora)
- Cuyahoga Valley Historical Museum (Peninsula)
- Dr. Bob's Home (Akron)
- Hale Farm & Village (Bath Township)
- Hower House (Akron)
- Kent State School of Art Galleries (Kent)
- Kent State University Museum (Kent)
- Kelso House Museum (Brimfield)
- Lowrie-Beatty Museum (Ravenna)
- Myers School of Art Galleries (Akron)
- Perkins Stone Mansion (Akron)
- Stan Hywet Hall and Gardens (Akron, Ohio)
- Twinsburg Historical Society (Twinsburg)

== Parks and recreation ==
=== National parks ===
==== Cuyahoga Valley National Park ====
Cuyahoga Valley National Park is a national park located in Summit County and lies between the major Ohio cities of Cleveland and Akron. It is the only national park located in Ohio and consists of over 33,000 acres. Waterfalls, rolling hills, caves, winding river scenery attract many park visitors. Over 125 miles of trails traverse the steep narrow ravines, rolling floodplain, and lush farmland throughout the park. The park offers an array of preserved and restored displays of 19th (see Hale Farm & Village) and early 20th century sustainable farming and pastoral, rural living, while catering to contemporary interests with art exhibits, outdoor concerts, and scenic excursion and special event railroad tours on the Cuyahoga Valley Scenic Railroad.

=== County-wide park districts ===
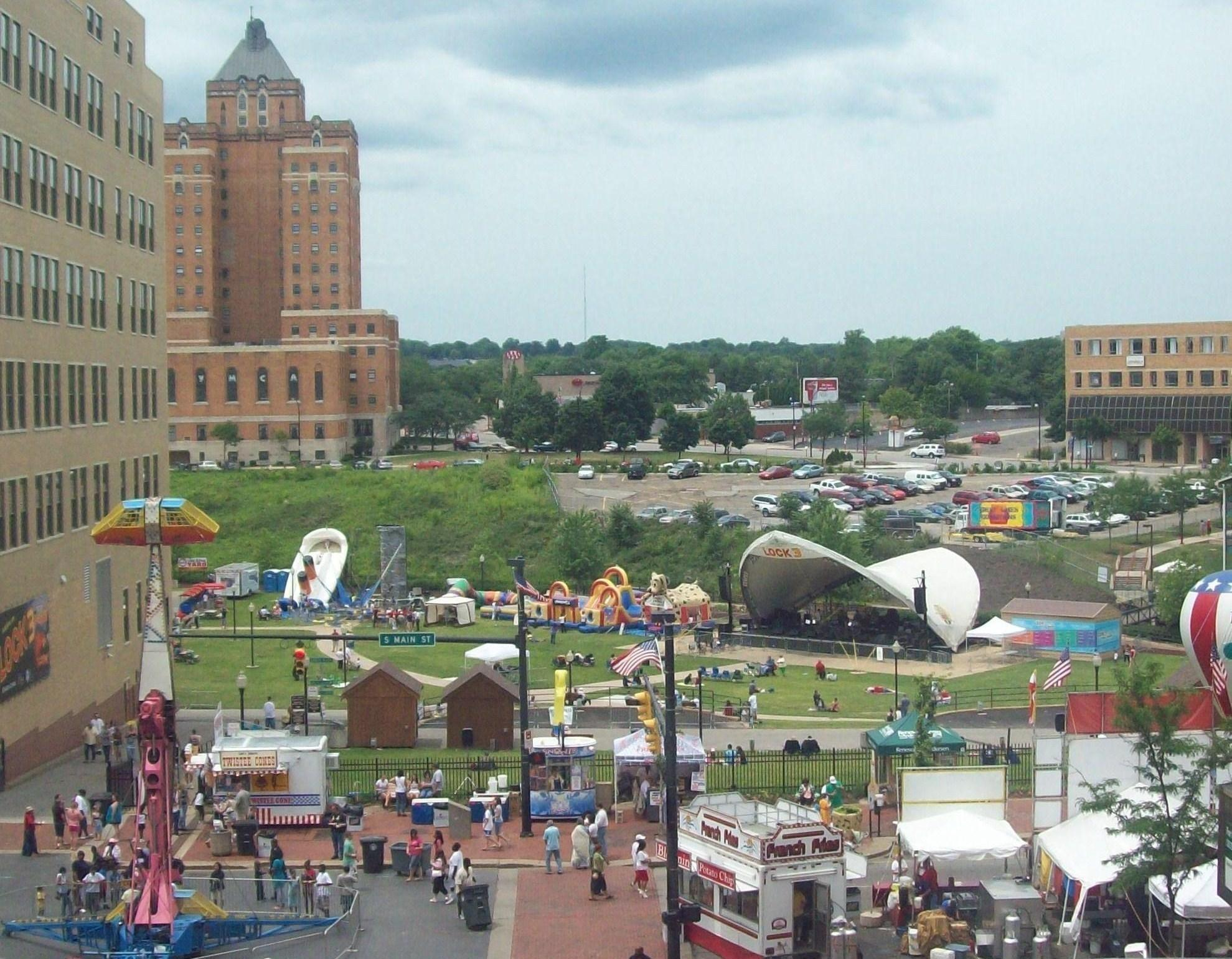
Lock 3 Park amphitheater in downtown Akron.

==== Summit Metro Parks ====
The Summit Metro Parks is a park district that manages over 11,000 acres (4,500 ha) in Summit County, including 14 developed parks, six conservation areas and more than 125 miles (201 km) of trails including the 33.5-mile (53.9 km) Hike and Bike Trail which follows the course of the old Akron, Bedford and Cleveland Railroad. The Freedom Trail is currently under construction, with phases one and two already complete. Phases one and two pass through Tallmadge, Munroe Falls, and Akron, and connect with the western end of the Portage Hike and Bike Trail in Kent. Phase three will connect the Freedom Trail to the Towpath Trail in downtown Akron.

==== The Ohio and Erie Canal Towpath Trail ====
The Ohio and Erie Canal Towpath Trail in Summit County follows the course of the former Ohio and Erie Canal. When the trail is fully complete, it will stretch about 100 miles from Downtown Cleveland in Cuyahoga County, though the Cuyahoga Valley National Park and Summit County, Stark County and end in New Philadelphia in Tuscarawas County. In 2011, Summit County became the first of the counties to complete their section of the Towpath Trail stretching 33.4 miles from the Portage Lakes in the southern portion of the county, through the suburbs and downtown Akron, and finally through the Cuyahoga Valley National Park.

==== Portage Park District ====
The Portage Park District is a county park district in Portage County that manages 2,470 acres (1,000 ha) of parkland and 14 miles (23 km) of hiking trails. Notable trails include the Headwater Trail which follows the former Cleveland and Mahoning Valley Railroad line and connects Mantua and Garrettsville. The Portage Hike and Bike Trail has several phases completed in and around Kent and Ravenna, with direct connections to the Freedom and Bike and Hike Trails in Summit County.

=== State parks and nature reserves ===
==== Nelson Kennedy Ledges State Park ====
Nelson Kennedy Ledges State Park is a 167-acre state park located near Garrettsville in Portage County. The spectacular rock formations at Nelson-Kennedy Ledges have become trademarks of the park. These rock formations are among the few outcrops in northern Ohio still exposed to view and offer hiking trails ranging from easy to difficult. Activities located in the park include hiking and picnicking.

==== Portage Lakes State Park ====
Portage Lakes State Park is a 2,475 acre state park located in Akron around the Portage Lakes. There are approximately 2034 acres of water and 8 lakes within the park that can be used for boating, fishing, and swimming and an additional 411 acres of land that can be used for camping, hunting, and picnicking.

==== Tinker's Creek State Park ====
Tinkers Creek State Park is a 370-acre state park located in Streetsboro in Portage County. Park activities include fishing on a 15-acre spring-fed lake, picnicking, hiking, and cross country skiing and ice fishing during winter.

==== West Branch State Park ====
West Branch State Park is an 8,002 acre state park located near Ravenna in Portage County. The large 2,650-acre lake can be used for boating, fishing, and swimming and contains numerous boat launches. The 5,379-acres of meadows and woodlots can be used for numerous activities such as for camping, hiking, hunting and horseback riding. The park maintains 14 miles of hiking trails, 12 miles of mountain biking trails, and 20 miles of bridle trails.

==== Wingfoot Lake State Park ====
Wingfoot Lake State Park is a 690-acre state park located in Mogadore in Portage County around Wingfoot Lake. The park was built in the 1960s by the Goodyear Tire and Rubber Company for their employees and corporate retreats. In 2009, the park was bought by the Ohio Department of Natural Resources, Division of Wildlife. Facilities include enclosed and open pavilion shelters (some with fireplaces), playgrounds, badminton courts, horseshoe pits, bocce ball courts, an 18-hole mini-golf course, and an 18-hole disc golf course. Boating and fishing is also permitted on the 444 acre Wingfoot Lake.

==== Public nature reserves ====
- Aurora Sanctuary State Nature Preserve – a 164-acre nature preserve located in Aurora.
- Eagle Creek State Nature Preserve – a 472-acre nature preserve located in Garrettsville.
- Herrick Fen – a 127-acre nature preserve located near Streetsboro.
- Tom S. Cooperrider-Kent Bog State Nature Preserve – a 42-acre nature preserve located in Kent.
- Marsh Wetlands – a 152-acre nature preserve located near Mantua.
- Novak (Blanche Katherine) Sanctuary – a 152-acre nature preserve located in Aurora.
- Portage Lakes Wetland State Nature Preserve – a 6-acre nature preserve located in Akron.
- Tinker's Creek State Nature Preserve – a 786-acre nature preserve located in Aurora.
- Triangle Lake Bog State Nature Preserve – a 61-acre nature reserve located in Rootstown.
- Tummonds State Nature Preserve – an 86-acre nature reserve located near Mantua.

== See also ==
- Ohio census statistical areas
