= InfoCision Stadium–Summa Field =

Football stadium in Akron, Ohio, United States

- New Rubber Bowl
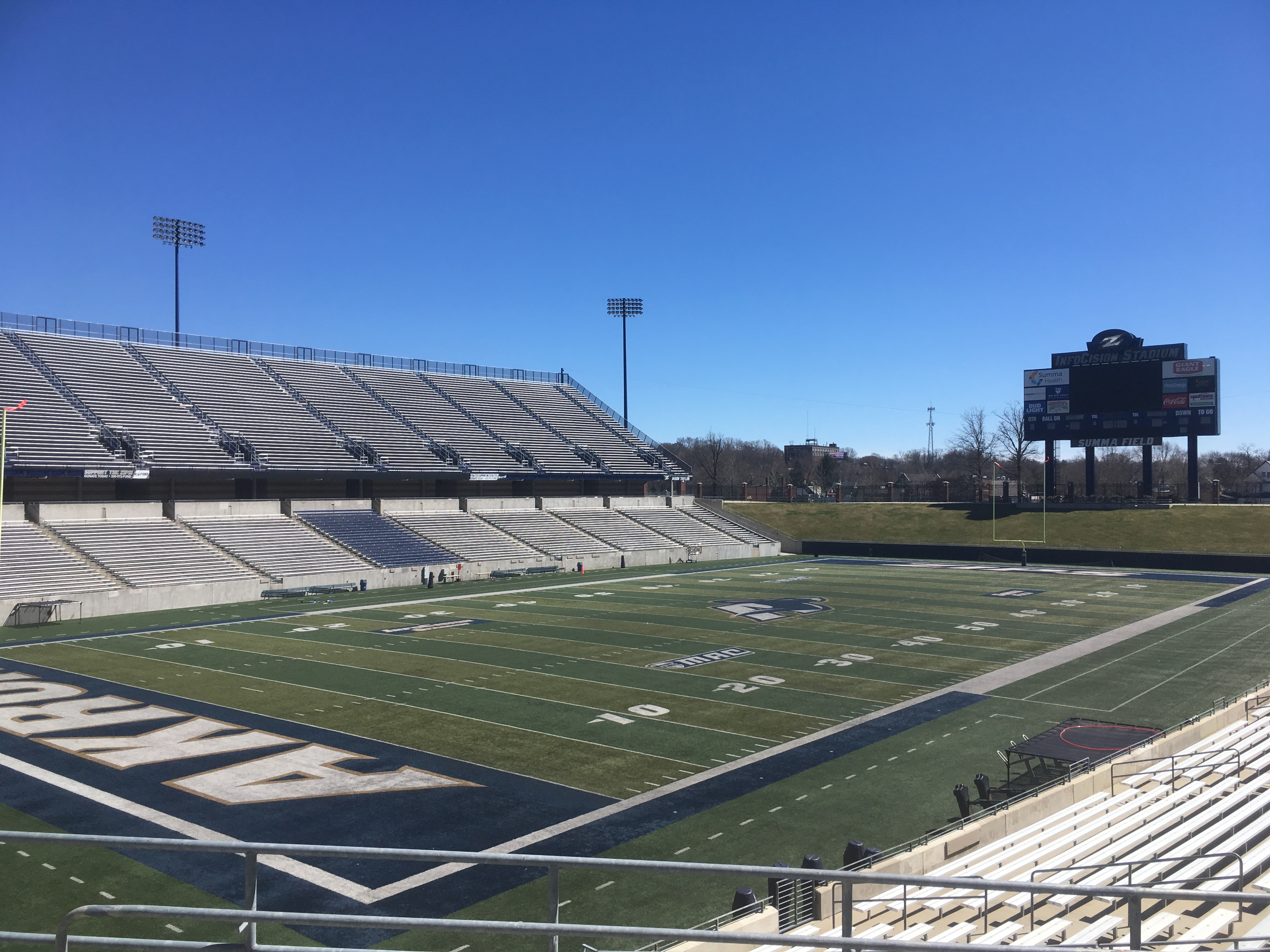
- View from north end of InfoCision Stadium, April 9, 2019
- Interactive map of InfoCision Stadium–Summa Field
- Full name: InfoCision Stadium–Summa Field
- Location: Akron, Ohio, United States
- Coordinates: 41°4′20.4492″N 81°30′28.8684″W
- Owner: University of Akron
- Operator: University of Akron
- Capacity: 30,000
- Surface: Prograss artificial turf
- Scoreboard: 84 ft × 64 ft (26 m × 20 m) frame surrounding 39 ft × 22 ft (11.9 m × 6.7 m) video board

Construction
- Groundbreaking: February 18, 2008
- Opened: September 12, 2009
- Cost: $61.6 million USD
- Architect: HNTB Architecture, Inc.
- Project manager: Welty Building Company
- Structural engineers: E.P.I. of Cleveland, Inc.
- General contractor: Marous Brothers Construction

Tenant
- Akron Zips football (NCAA)

InfoCision Stadium–Summa Field is a college American football stadium in Akron, Ohio and the home field of the Akron Zips football team at the University of Akron. New for the 2009 football season, the official ground-breaking ceremony for the stadium was held on April 4, 2008, and it opened on September 12, 2009, for a sold-out game between the Akron Zips and the Morgan State Bears. The stadium was constructed to replace the Rubber Bowl, which was the prior home of the University of Akron Zips football team. Four companies hold naming rights to various parts of the stadium.

== History ==
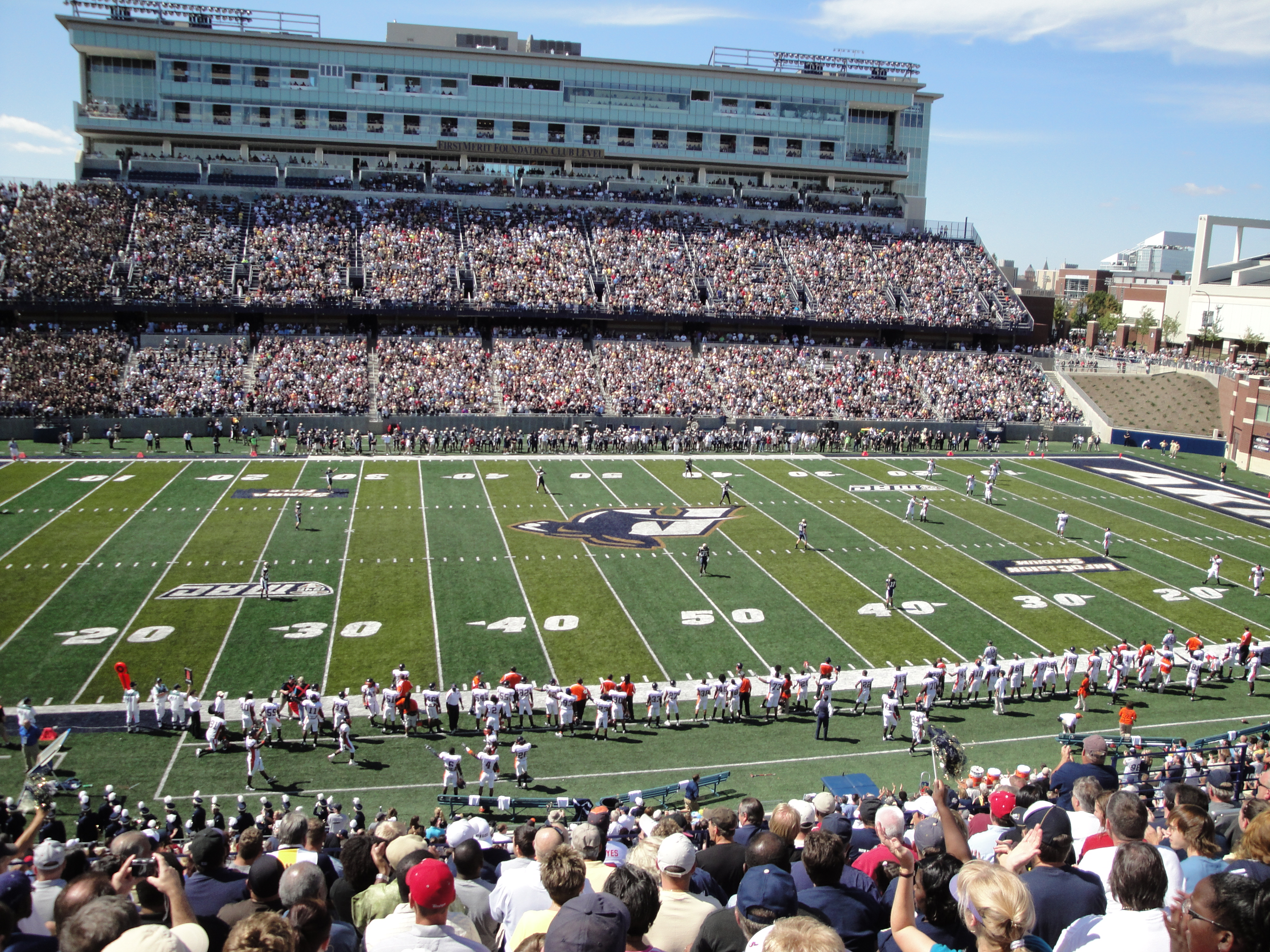
View of InfoCision Stadium press tower

InfoCision Stadium was constructed as part of a building initiative undergone by the University of Akron called the "New Landscape for Learning". The $300 million construction program included the construction and renovations of numerous buildings on campus, including the Buchtel College of Arts and Sciences building, an honors complex, a student recreation center, and a student union. The Rubber Bowl, the former home of the Zips football team, was located 6 miles (9.7 km) away of the Akron campus. Due to the high maintenance costs for the facility, the decision was made to construct an on-campus stadium.

To build the new stadium, several dormitories had to be demolished and the properties of local tenants were acquired using eminent domain. In order to house the displaced students, the University spent $22.6 million to purchase Quaker Square, a former Quaker Oats Company oat silo that was converted into a hotel.

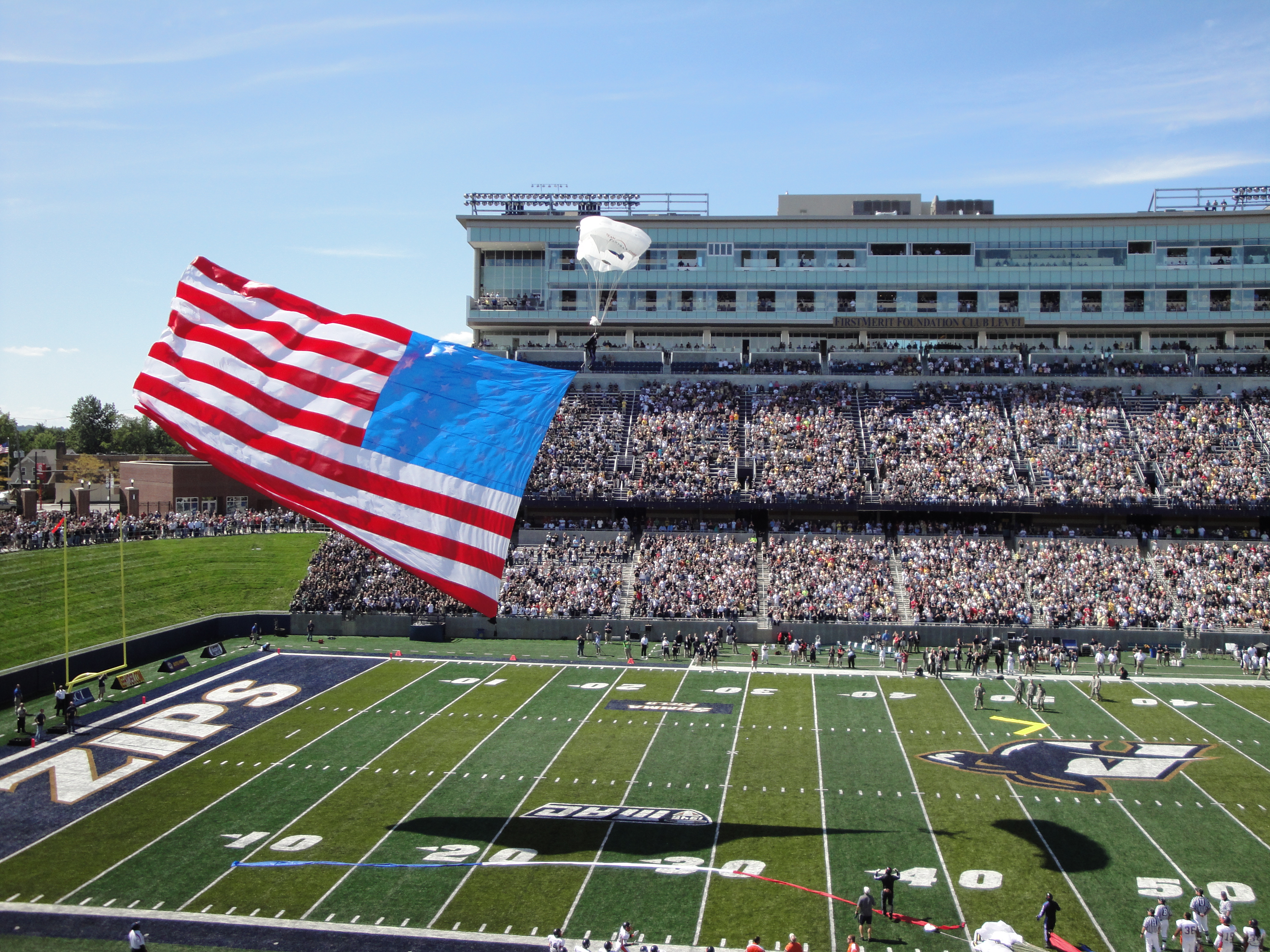
A parachuter descends with American flag in tow onto the surface of Summa Field as part of the opening day festivities.

The home opener of the 2009 football season marked the first game held in InfoCision Stadium. In it, the Zips defeated Morgan State 41–0. To mark the occasion, a ribbon-cutting ceremony was held to inaugurate the new stadium. Amongst those who cut the ribbon were Don Plusquellic (Mayor of Akron), Betty Sutton (member of the United States House of Representatives), and Luis Proenza (President of the University of Akron). In the 2014–2015 season, the cumulative total attendance for six games in the 30,000 seat facility was 55,019, the worst among all 125 teams in the NCAA Football Bowl subdivision.

== Structure and facilities ==
InfoCision Stadium holds 27,000 spectators in traditional seating with an additional 3,000 on the grassy knoll on the south end of the stadium. The cost for the stadium complex, including the end zone facility, was $61.6 million. There is one team shop, located on the south side of the stadium. The scoreboard frame is 84 ft (26 m) wide and 60 ft (18 m) high. A 39 by 22 ft (11.9 by 6.7 m) video board is surrounded by the frame. In addition, there are video ribbon boards located throughout. The seven-level press tower contains concession stands, restrooms, and 80,000 sq ft (7,400 m^{2}) of academic space. Premium seating options include the Kaulig Companies Club Level, which features 522 Club Seats, 38 luxury boxes, two bar areas, and upscale concessions; 17 Suites, which include 16 private suites, and one presidential suite; and the Montrose Auto Group Press Level. The 7th level of the western building contains press rooms. Lower levels of the tower include locker rooms and sports medicine facilities.

The stadium also has a sloped, grassy hill at the south end of the field that seats 3,000 people. The section is used to accommodate spillover from the 5,000 seat student section, also known as the "Roo Zoo", that is located in the bleachers adjacent to the hill on both sides of the field.

== Naming rights ==
The stadium is named for InfoCision Management Corporation and the playing field for Summa Health System. In the press tower on the stadium's west side, the club seating is named after the Columbus-based Huntington Bancshares and the press box for the local Towpath Credit Union. Principal naming rights for the stadium were purchased through a personal donation by Gary Taylor, Founder and Chairman of InfoCision Management Corporation, a firm based in nearby Bath Township that operates call centers. Through Taylor's $10 million donation to the university, InfoCision secured naming rights for the stadium for 20 years.

Summa Health System, an Ohio Non-Profit Hospital, purchased (by means of its for-profit insurance company, SummaCare) 20 years of naming rights for the field with a $5 million donation. FirstMerit Corporation, a financial services company headquartered in Akron, purchased naming rights for the club level seating of the press tower for 10 years. Naming rights were transferred to Columbus-based Huntington after the buyout of FirstMerit. When the deal expired in 2023, that level was re-named in honor of Hudson based Kaulig Companies. Towpath Credit Union pledged $100,000 over five years to secure naming rights to the press box located in top level of the press tower until 2013, with an additional option for a 5-year extension through 2018. When that expired, the Press Box was renamed in honor of the Montrose Auto Group of car dealerships.

== Attendance records ==
| Rank | Attendance | Date | Game Result |
|---|---|---|---|
| 1 | 27,881 | September 12, 2009 | Akron 41, Morgan State 0 |
| 2 | 23,425 | September 12, 2015 | Akron 7, Pittsburgh 24 |
| 3 | 22,811 | September 16, 2017 | Akron 14, Iowa State 41 |
| 4 | 22,692 | October 12, 2019 | Akron 3, Kent State 26 |
| 5 | 22,437 | October 6, 2018 | Akron 17, Miami (OH) 41 |
| 6 | 21,683 | November 21, 2017 | Akron 24, Kent State 14 |
| 7 | 21,414 | November 26, 2019 | Akron 3, Ohio 52 |
| 8 | 20,802 | November 7, 2009 | Akron 28, Kent State 20 |
| 9 | 20,239 | November 2, 2013 | Akron 16, Kent State 7 |
| 10 | 20,199 | October 7, 2017 | Akron 31, Ball State 3 |
| 11 | 19,889 | November 12, 2011 | Akron 3, Kent State 35 |
| 12 | 19,775 | October 5, 2013 | Akron 3, Ohio 43 |
| 13 | 19,653 | September 7, 2013 | Akron 35, James Madison 33 |
| 14 | 18,981 | October 31, 2015 | Akron 6, Central Michigan 14 |
| 15 | 18,972 | September 7, 2019 | Akron 20, UAB 31 |
| 16 | 18,809 | September 21, 2013 | Akron 30, Louisiana–Lafayette 35 |
| 17 | 18,413 | September 8, 2018 | Akron 41, Morgan State 7 |
| 18 | 18,340 | September 19, 2009 | Akron 21, Indiana 38 |
| 19 | 17,742 | November 17, 2018 | Akron 6, Bowling Green 21 |
| 20 | 17,582 | October 27, 2018 | Akron 17, Central Michigan 10 |

== See also ==
- List of NCAA Division I FBS football stadiums
