= Joint Economic Development District =

A Joint Economic Development District (JEDD) is an arrangement in Ohio where one or more municipalities and a township agree to work together to develop township land for commercial or industrial purposes. The benefit to the municipality is that they get a portion of the taxes levied in the JEDD without having to annex it. The benefits to the township are that it does not lose prime development land, it can still collect property taxes as well as a portion of the income tax collected, and it normally receives water from the municipality, which it may not otherwise have. In 1993, the Ohio General Assembly passed legislation enabling local communities to create JEDDs.

JEDDs began in Summit County. Akron had been annexing parts of neighboring townships. This made for bad relations with the townships and hurt them economically. Mayor Don Plusquellic championed the idea of the JEDD as a way to expand the city's tax base without having to fight with its neighbors. This required new legislation from the state. Initially only Summit County was allowed to have JEDDs but later on the idea was expanded to the rest of the state. Akron quickly formed JEDDs with Springfield, Coventry, and Copley townships. Later on, in conjunction with Fairlawn it formed a JEDD with Bath Township. Since then other communities in Summit County and the rest of the state have formed JEDDs.

To create a JEDD, the municipality and township work together to create a contract. This contract specifies details such as how taxes are levied and shared, annexation prohibitions and water rates. The communities then vote on the agreement. The issue must pass in each community for the JEDD to be approved.

In 2006, a JEDD was established between the City of Columbus (Franklin County, Ohio) and three jurisdictions in Pickaway County. The purpose was to make infrastructure available to aid in the business development that will come due to the construction of an intermodal facility by the Norfolk Southern Railway, the presence of the Rickenbacker Freight Air Hub, business development by the Columbus Regional Airport Authority on property they own, and private industrial parks in the area. The JEDD provides for the provision of sanitary sewer, water, roadway, connectivity and other infrastructure that will be necessary for new business location in the Rickenbacker area. In the past 20 years, almost 26,000,000 square feet (2,400,000 m^{2}) of distribution space has been developed in the Rickenbacker area. The long-term projection for additional logistics development is in the area of $9 billion and almost 70,000 direct and indirect jobs. Other partners include the Greater Columbus Chamber of Commerce, CompeteColumbus, Franklin County, the Villages of South Bloomfield and Ashville.

Other JEDDs include agreements between:

- Olmsted Falls and Olmsted Township (Cuyahoga County), Ohio.
- City of Dayton and Butler Township (Montgomery County), effective January 1, 2007
- City of Dayton and Miami Township (Montgomery County), effective January 1, 2006 "to promote economic development around the Dayton-Wright Brothers Airport".
- City of Milford and Union Township (Clermont County) to include a 1% income tax at the Ivy Pointe business park .
- City of Middletown and Liberty Township (Butler County) for "Economic expansion of 600 acres (2.4 km^{2}) of commercial development on the Liberty Interchange in addition to increased visibility that will come to Cincinnati-Dayton Road and Hamilton-Mason."
- City of Mount Healthy and Springfield Township (Hamilton County).
- West Chester Township and the City of Fairfield, and city of Springdale. https://web.archive.org/web/20130513144951/http://www.westchesteroh.org/JEDD.cfm
- City of Kent and Brimfield Township
- City of Tallmadge and Brimfield Township
