= Red Forest (album) =

Studio album by If These Trees Could Talk
- Released: March 20, 2012
- Recorded: September to December 2011
- Studio: NEMeadow Studio (Bath, Ohio)
- Genre: Post-rock, post-metal
- Length: 47:36
- Label: Self-released, Science of Silence, Metal Blade

If These Trees Could Talk chronology
| Above the Earth, Below the Sky (2009) | Red Forest (2012) | The Bones of a Dying World (2016) |

Red Forest is the second album by American post-rock band If These Trees Could Talk. It was independently released on March 20, 2012, pressed on vinyl by Science of Silence then re-released by Metal Blade in January 2015. The album was recorded from September to December 2011 at NEMeadow Studio in Bath by Zack Kelly and Rick Fuller, mixed by Zack Kelly and mastered by Will Putney.

Professional ratings
Review scores
| Source | Rating |
|---|---|
| New Noise Magazine | 5/5 stars |
| Rock n Reel Reviews | 4.5/5 stars |
| Substream Magazine | 3.5/5 stars |

== Track listing ==
All tracks are written by If These Trees Could Talk.

| No. | Title | Length |
|---|---|---|
| 1. | "Breath of Life" | 1:48 |
| 2. | "The First Fire" | 6:30 |
| 3. | "Barren Lands of the Modern Dinosaur" | 5:57 |
| 4. | "They Speak with Knives" | 5:40 |
| 5. | "The Gift of Two Rivers" | 1:11 |
| 6. | "Red Forest" | 8:25 |
| 7. | "Aleutian Clouds" | 3:03 |
| 8. | "Left to Rust and Rot" | 5:24 |
| 9. | "When the Big Hand Buries the Twelve" | 9:38 |
| Total length: | | 47:36 |

== Personnel ==
If These Trees Could Talk

- Tom Fihe – bass
- Zack Kelly – drums
- Cody Kelly – guitar
- Jeff Kalal – guitar
- Mike Socrates – guitar

Production

- Zack Kelly – producer, engineering, mixing
- Rick Fuller – engineering, mixing
- Will Putney – mastering
- Charlie Wagers – art direction, design
