= If These Trees Could Talk (EP) =

EP by If These Trees Could Talk
- Released: September 27, 2006
- Recorded: NEMeadow Studios in Bath
- Genre: Post-rock, post-metal
- Length: 32:01
- Label: The Mylene Sheath
- Producer: If These Trees Could Talk, Zack Kelly

If These Trees Could Talk chronology
If These Trees Could Talk (2006)	Above the Earth, Below the Sky (2009)

Vinyl reissue cover

If These Trees Could Talk is the eponymous debut EP by the American post-rock band If These Trees Could Talk. It was released independently on September 27, 2006. NEMeadow Studios in Bath then mastered by John Walsh at Lava Room Recordings in Cleveland.

After being out of print for over ten years, the EP was reissued in 2022 by Metal Blade Records on vinyl, featuring a new album cover and packaging.

== Track listing ==
All songs written, recorded and produced by If These Trees Could Talk.

No.	Title	Length
1.	"Malabar Front"	8:05
2.	"Smoke Stacks"	6:24
3.	"The Friscalating Dusklight"	4:32
4.	"Signal Tree"	5:24
5.	"The Death of Paradigm"	4:06
6.	"41°4'23n, -81°31'4w"	3:30
Total length:		32:01

== Personnel ==
If These Trees Could Talk

- Tom Fihe - bass
- Zack Kelly - drums
- Cody Kelly - guitar
- Jeff Kalal - guitar
- Mike Socrates - guitar

Production

- Zack Kelly - artwork, producer, mixing
- John Walsh - mastering
