= Wayland, Ohio =

Unincorporated community in Portage County, Ohio

- Unincorporated area
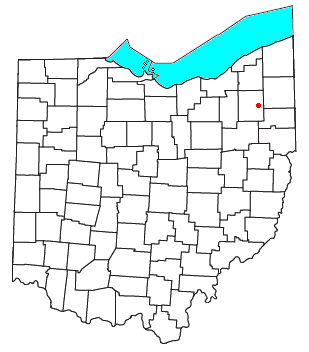
- Location in Ohio
- Location in the United States
- Coordinates: 41°09′38″N 81°04′16″W
- Country: United States
- State: Ohio
- County: Portage
- Township: Paris
- Named for: Wayland Hoyt
- Elevation: 942 ft (287 m)
- Time zone: UTC-5 (Eastern (EST))
  - Summer (DST): UTC-4 (EDT)
- ZIP code: 44285
- Area codes: 330, 234
- FIPS code: 39-81998
- GNIS feature ID: 1065458

Wayland is an unincorporated community of Paris Township in Portage County, Ohio, United States. It has a post office with the ZIP code 44285. The community is part of the Akron metropolitan area.

It was founded as Newport and was a stop along the Pennsylvania and Ohio Canal. It was later called Parisville and eventually Cyclone. Because there was some confusion for railroad passengers when the town of Cyclone was announced, townspeople changed the community's name to Wayland in 1900, after Wayland Hoyt, a Baptist minister there at the time.
