= The Bones of a Dying World =

Studio album by If These Trees Could Talk
- Released: June 3, 2016
- Genre: Post-rock, post-metal
- Length: 54:34
- Label: Metal Blade Records
- Producer: Zack Kelly

If These Trees Could Talk chronology
Red Forest (2012)	The Bones of a Dying World (2016)

The Bones of a Dying World is the third studio album by American post-rock band If These Trees Could Talk. It was released on June 3, 2016 through Metal Blade Records. The album was produced by drummer Zack Kelly. The album was announced in late April 2016 alongside premiere track "Solstice". Subsequently, debuted in May 2016 were tracks "Earth Crawler" and "Berlin".

Professional ratings
Review scores
Source	Rating
Echoes and Dust	(mixed)
Metal Blast	4.5/5 stars
Ultimate Guitar	8/10

== Track listing ==
No.	Title	Length
1.	"Solstice"	7:50
2.	"Swallowing Teeth"	4:27
3.	"Earth Crawler"	6:38
4.	"After the Smoke Clears"	6:18
5.	"The Here and Hereafter"	2:34
6.	"Iron Glacier"	8:26
7.	"The Giving Tree"	6:03
8.	"Berlin"	4:44
9.	"One Sky Above Us"	7:34

== Personnel ==
- Tom Fihe – bass
- Jeff Kalal – guitar
- Cody Kelly – guitar
- Mike Socrates – guitar
- Zack Kelly – drums
