= Above the Earth, Below the Sky =

Studio album by If These Trees Could Talk
- Released: March 11, 2009
- Recorded: Mammoth Cave Studio in Akron
- Genre: Post-rock, post-metal
- Length: 44:58
- Label: self-released, The Mylene Sheath, Metal Blade
- Producer: Zack Kelly and Tim Gerak

If These Trees Could Talk chronology
If These Trees Could Talk (2006)	Above the Earth, Below the Sky (2009)	Red Forest (2012)

Above the Earth, Below the Sky is the first full-length studio album by American post-rock band If These Trees Could Talk. It was independently released on March 11, 2009 and then re-released by The Mylene Sheath on vinyl the following year then released once again through Metal Blade in January 2015. The album was recorded, mixed and mastered by Tim Gerak at Mammoth Cave Studio in Akron. The album was produced by Zack Kelly and Tim Gerak.

== Reception ==
Professional ratings
Review scores
Source	Rating
New Noise Magazine	5/5 stars

Nathaniel Lay of New Noise Magazine gave the album a positive review, describing the album as an "ambitious beginning" noting a "[slight falter]" in their "heavier movements". He summarized by stating "You don't have to be a lover of instrumental to get lost within [this band]."

== Track listing ==
All songs written by If These Trees Could Talk.

No.	Title	Length
1.	"From Roots to Needles"	6:42
2.	"What's in the Ground Belongs to You"	4:14
3.	"Terra Incognita"	0:57
4.	"Above the Earth"	2:19
5.	"Below the Sky"	7:20
6.	"The Sun Is in the North"	5:45
7.	"Thirty-Six Silos"	4:39
8.	"The Flames of Herostratus"	5:34
9.	"Rebuilding the Temple of Artemis"	5:05
10.	"Deus Ex Machina"	2:23
Total length:		44:58

== Personnel ==
If These Trees Could Talk

- Tom Fihe – bass
- Zack Kelly – drums
- Cody Kelly – guitar
- Jeff Kalal – guitar
- Mike Socrates – guitar

Production

- Tim Gerak – engineering, mixing, mastering, producer
- Zack Kelly – producer
