= Hale Farm and Village =

Historic house in Ohio, United States

- Jonathan Hale Homestead
- U.S. National Register of Historic Places
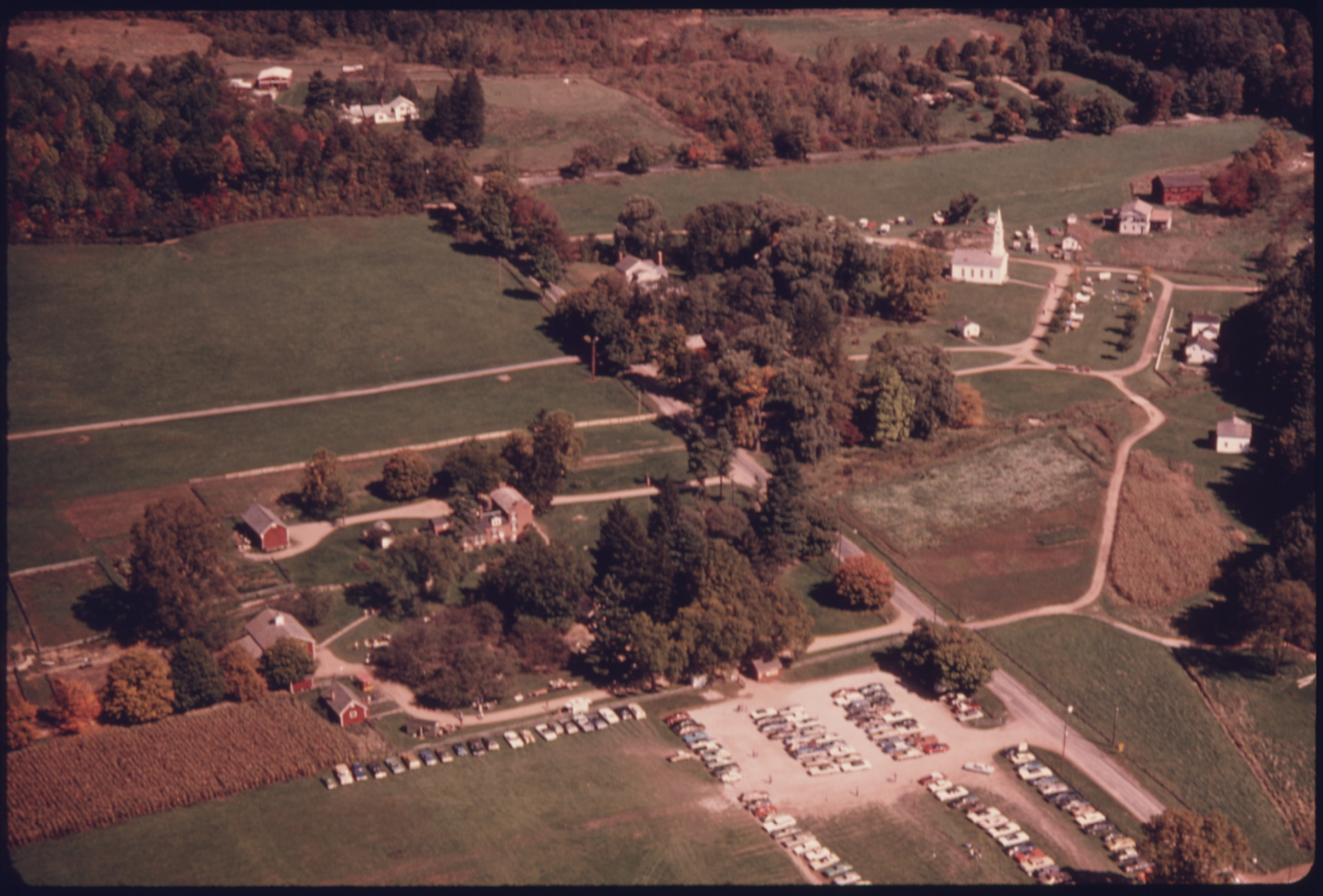
- Aerial view of Hale Farm and Village in 1975

- Location within Ohio Location within the United States
- Location: 2686 Oak Hill Rd., Bath, Ohio
- Coordinates: 41°11′35″N 81°35′33″W
- Built: 1825
- NRHP reference No.: 73000258
- Added to NRHP: April 23, 1973

Hale Farm and Village is a historic property of the Western Reserve Historical Society in Bath Township, Summit County, Ohio, United States. It is within the boundaries of the Cuyahoga Valley National Park. Hale Farm was the original homestead of Jonathan Hale, a Connecticut farmer who migrated to the Western Reserve in 1810. In 1973 Hale Farm was listed on the National Register of Historic Places as the Jonathan Hale Homestead. The Hale House was built in 1825.

== Wheatfield ==
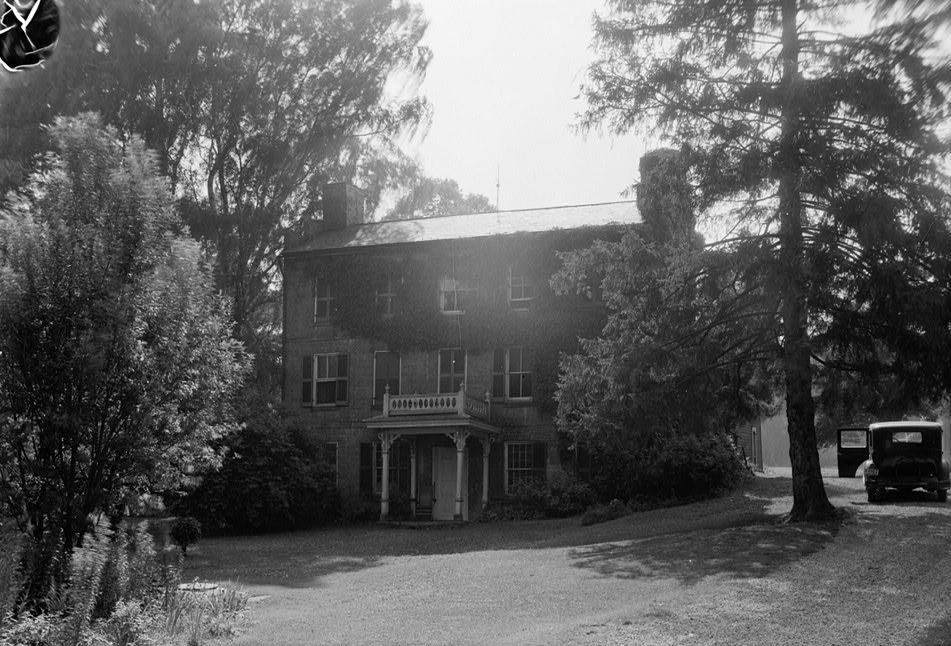
Jonathan Hale house in 1936

The Western Reserve Historical Society opened Hale Farm in 1958 after receiving the property from Clara Belle Ritchie, descendant of Jonathan Hale.

The eastern half of Hale Farm and Village is a living history museum that has a variety of historical buildings, most relocated from elsewhere. This recreated village is called Wheatfield. The majority of Wheatfield's structures are inhabited by people who present information on their location but acknowledge the modern world. This technique is known as third-person interpretation. First-person interpretation means that the inhabitants of a structure work as actors who play out the livelihood of a certain year and setting. The timeframe reenacted by the first-person interpreters at Wheatfield was 1862 in 2007. Each year, the actors will move forward one year, until they reach 1865, the end of the American Civil War, at which point they will revert to 1861, which was the beginning of the war. They also offer programs such as A Fugitive's Path to Freedom.

Hale Farm and Village also has demonstrations of various nineteenth-century trades such as candle, broom, and brick making, glass blowing, and a blacksmith shop.

== See also ==
- Alfred Kelley mansion
- National Register of Historic Places listings in Summit County, Ohio
