= Old Trail School (Bath, Ohio) =

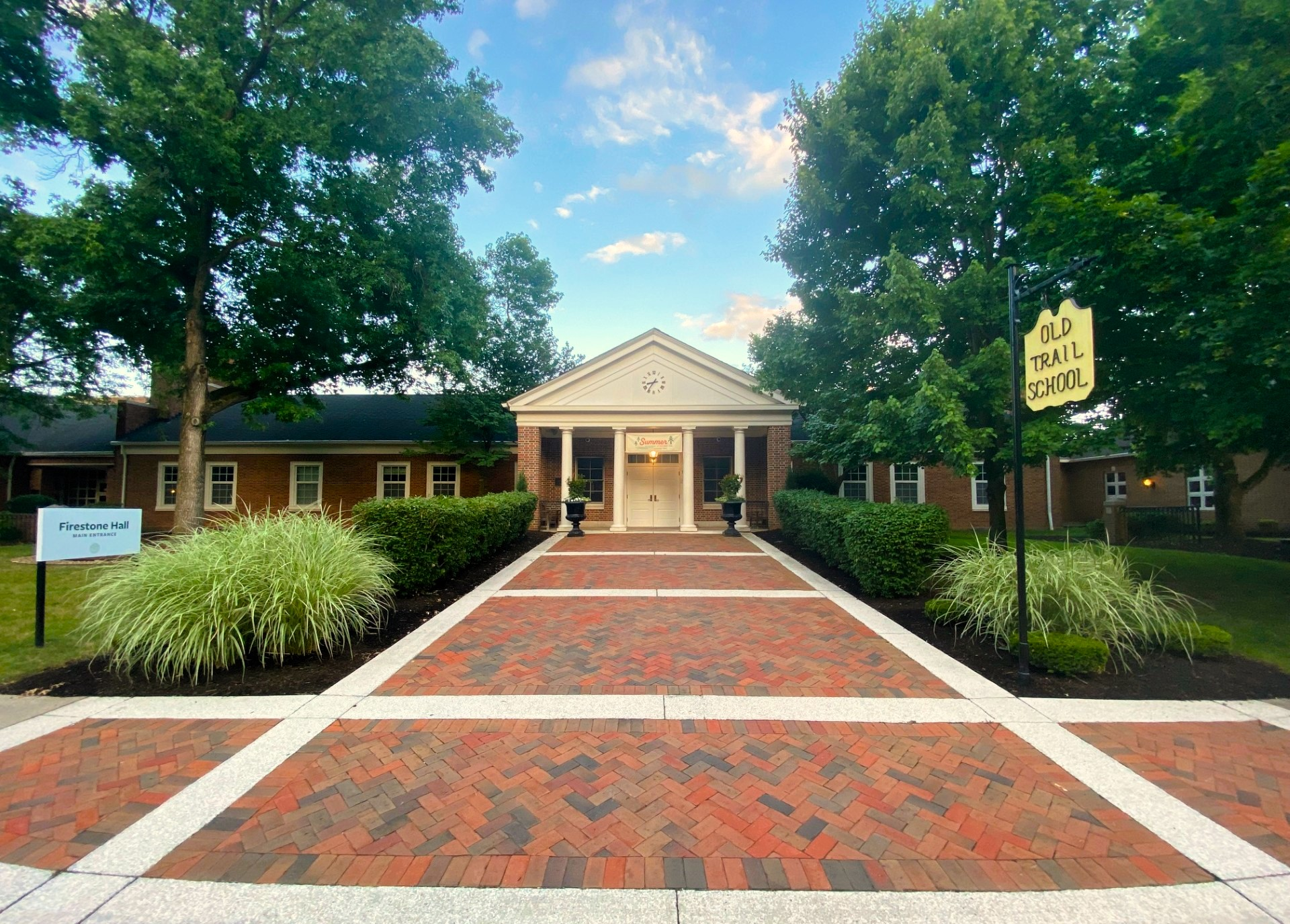

Location
- 2315 Ira Road; Bath, Ohio 44210; United States
- Coordinates: 41°11′13″N 81°35′17″W

Information
- Type: Private, Secular, Co-ed
- Established: 1920
- Headmaster: Sarah Johnston
- Enrollment: 571
- Colors: Forest, green, and white
- Athletics: 8 sports
- Mascot: Buffalo
- Website: www.oldtrail.org

Old Trail School is an independent coeducational day school, serving toddler though grade 8, founded in 1920. It is in Bath, Ohio, in Cuyahoga Valley National Park, and is the only independent school in the United States that is in a national park.

== History ==
Old Trail School was founded in 1920 in Akron, Ohio, and was originally housed in the basement of an Episcopal church on West Market Street. In 1926, the school moved to its first campus, on Covington Road in the Fairlawn Heights neighborhood of Akron. For many years, the school included a high school, known as the Upper School, grades 9 through 12. The school moved to its current campus, in Bath Township, in 1967.

== Facility ==
The school is on a 62-acre (25 ha) campus in Cuyahoga Valley National Park. Alderfer and Sisler-McFawn Halls house the primary grades. Noble Hall and the Wilson Wing house third through eighth grades. Other buildings include the library, the administration building, the cafeteria, the gymnasium, the swimming pool, and the performing-arts center.

The Head of School at Old Trail School is Sarah Johnston.

== Notable alumni ==
- Gates McFadden, class of 1966; actress and choreographer
- Jason Rohrer, class of 1992; computer programmer and game designer
- Bronny James (attended); professional basketball player and son of professional basketball player LeBron James
