= If These Trees Could Talk =

American post-rock band

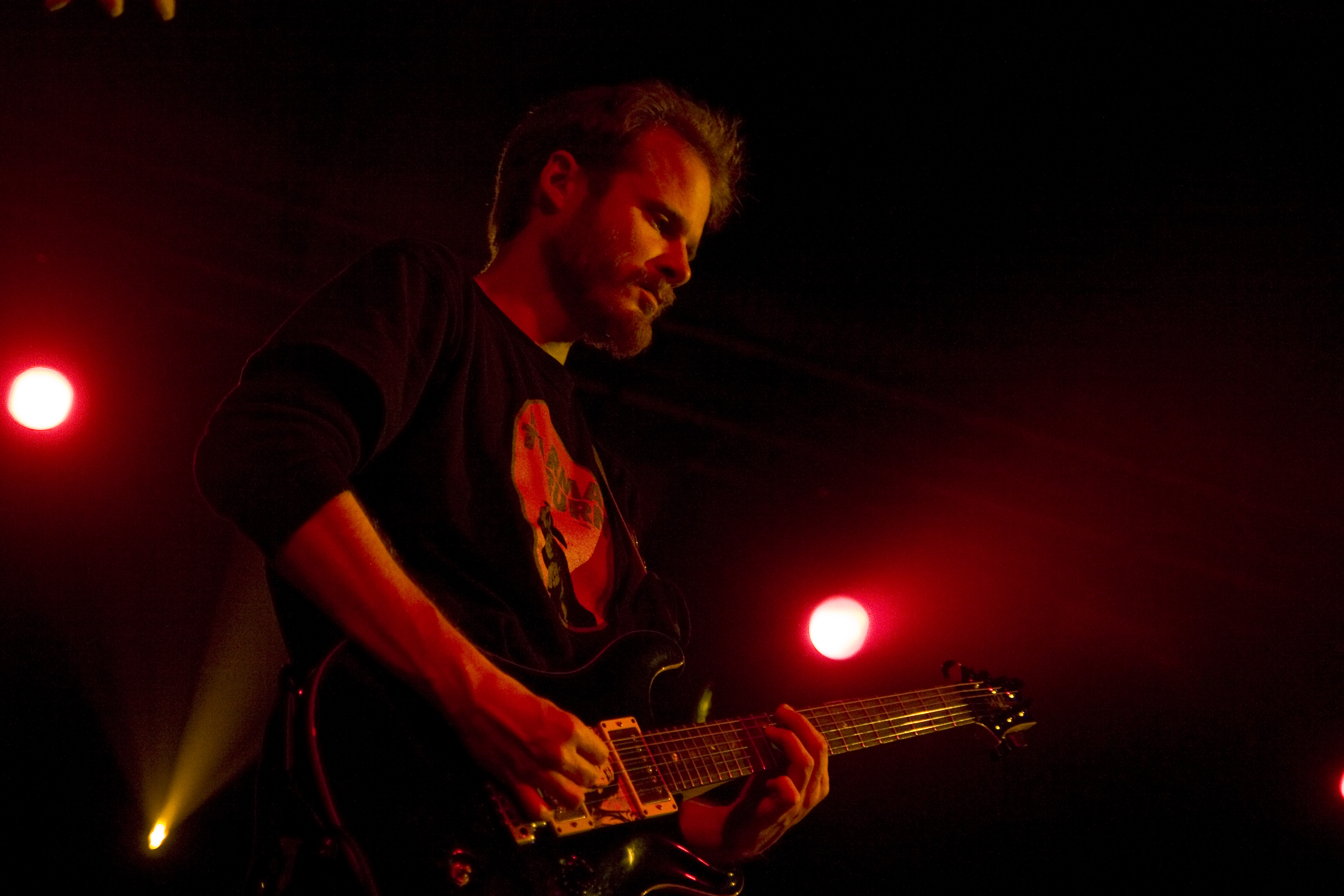
- If These Trees Could Talk in 2012

Background information
- Origin: Akron, Ohio, US
- Genres: Post-rock; post-metal
- Years active: 2005–present
- Labels: The Mylene Sheath; Science of Silence; Metal Blade
- Members: Tom Fihe; Jeff Kalal; Cody Kelly; Zack Kelly; Mike Socrates

If These Trees Could Talk is an American instrumental post-rock band from Akron, Ohio. They self-released their self-titled debut EP in 2006. Independent record label the Mylene Sheath re-issued the EP on vinyl in 2007 and went on to publish the band's debut studio album, Above the Earth, Below the Sky, on vinyl also, in 2009. The band self-released their second album, Red Forest, in March 2012, with a vinyl version coming out through Science of Silence Records. They followed it with a self-promoted tour throughout Europe in April 2012. If These Trees Could Talk issued their third album, The Bones of a Dying World, in June 2016, on Metal Blade Records. All their previous releases were subsequently re-issued in 2021 and 2022 on the same label. In February 2024, they published the single "Trail of Whispering Giants", their first new material in nearly eight years.

== Band members ==
- Tom Fihe – bass guitar
- Jeff Kalal – guitar
- Cody Kelly – guitar
- Mike Socrates – guitar
- Zack Kelly – drums

== Discography ==
Studio albums

- Above the Earth, Below the Sky (2009)
- Red Forest (2012)
- The Bones of a Dying World (2016)
- The Hidden Hand (2026)

EPs

- If These Trees Could Talk (2006)

Singles

- "Trail of Whispering Giants" (2024)
