= InfoCision Management Corporation =

American call center company

InfoCision
- Company type: Private
- Founded: 1982
- Founder: Gary Taylor
- Headquarters: 325 Springside Drive, Akron, OH 44333, Akron, Ohio, U.S.
- Key people: Craig Taylor (CEO)
- Website: www.infocision.com

InfoCision Management Corporation is a company that operates call centers. Based in Bath Township, Ohio outside of Akron, it is the second-largest teleservice company in the United States. It operates 30 call centers at 12 locations in Ohio, West Virginia, and Pennsylvania, employing more than 4,000 people.

InfoCision was founded by Gary Taylor in his suburban Akron home in 1982. For the first three years, IMC managed its client's telefundraising campaigns as a marketing consultant while a separate call center company made the phone calls. In 1985, InfoCision opened its first call center. In 2004, Taylor stepped down as president and CEO to become chairman. On April 20, 2012, Ohio Attorney General Mike DeWine announced a settlement agreement he had reached with InfoCision. After an investigation, the Attorney General's Charitable Law Section "found reason to believe InfoCision violated several sections of the Ohio Charitable Organizations Act." InfoCision denied violating the law. As part of the settlement, InfoCision agreed to pay $75,000 and "fully abide by the state's laws on soliciting charitable contributions." On October 10, 2012, the company announced that Craig Taylor, son of company founder Gary Taylor, was promoted to the position of CEO, replacing Carl Albright.

InfoCision works with both companies and nonprofit organizations. It focuses on customer acquisition and retention, fundraising, and volunteer recruitment. The company is divided into nine divisions: financial services, telecommunications, media, consumer and business services and religious, nonprofit and political fundraising. In addition to call centers, InfoCision provides direct mail/bulk fulfillment services, offering variable on-demand data printing services, a one-to-one marketing strategy. On-demand printing allows different elements such as text, graphics and images to change from one printed piece to the next without stopping or slowing down the printing process to deliver a customized message to customers. InfoCision telefundraisers often request that people volunteer to mail fifteen preprinted solicitation letters to their friends and family. The volunteers are asked to use their own postage, and the funds are sent to InfoCision, earmarked for charities such as the March of Dimes and the American Cancer Society.
