= Bath Township, Summit County, Ohio =

Township in Ohio, US

- Township
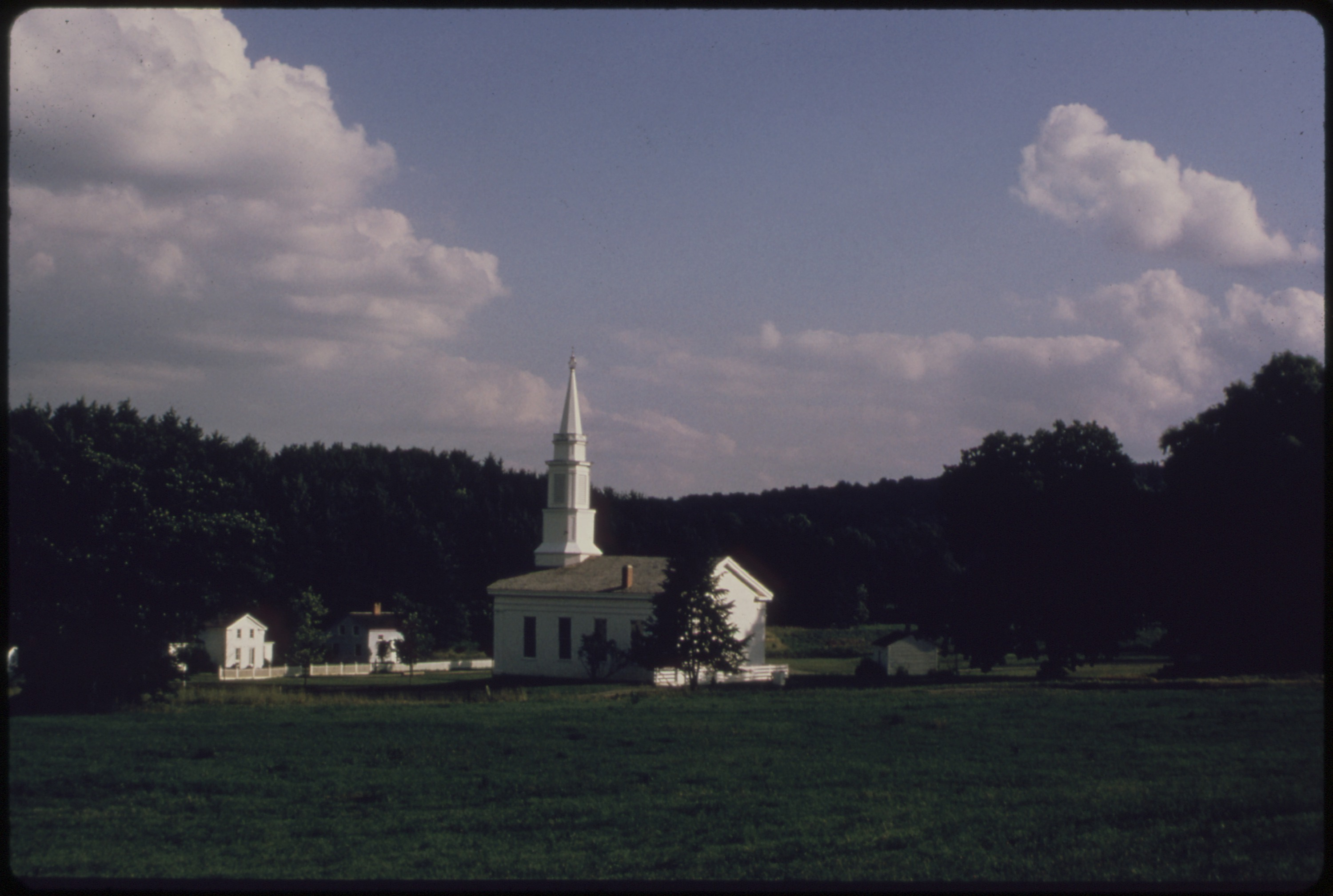
- Hale Farm and Village in Bath

- Location in Summit County and the state of Ohio.
- Coordinates: 41°9′29″N 81°38′0″W
- Country: United States
- State: Ohio
- County: Summit
- Established: 1818

Area
  - Total: 22.5 sq mi (58.2 km^{2})
  - Land: 22.3 sq mi (57.7 km^{2})
  - Water: 0.15 sq mi (0.4 km^{2})
- Elevation: 948 ft (289 m)

Population (2020)
  - Total: 10,024
  - Density: 450/sq mi (173.7/km^{2})
- Time zone: UTC-5 (Eastern (EST))
  - Summer (DST): UTC-4 (EDT)
- ZIP code: 44210
- Area code: 330
- FIPS code: 39-04248
- GNIS feature ID: 1086995
- Website: Bath Township

Bath Township is one of the nine townships of Summit County, Ohio, United States. A suburb of Akron, the 2020 census found 10,024 people in the township.

== History ==
Bath Counties
Year	County
1796	Wayne
1800	Trumbull
1808	Portage
1811	No county
1812	Medina
1840	Summit

The name was changed to Bath when it fully separated from Richfield Township in 1818.

In 1998, Bath Township formed a Joint Economic Development District (JEDD) with Akron and Fairlawn. The JEDD area comprises approximately 300 acres (120 hectares) and is in the business district at the southern end of the township.

The counties historically associated with Bath are shown in the table to the right.

=== Name ===
Originally, the area had been known as "Number 3, Range 12, of the Western Reserve". When surveyed in 1808, the township became known as Wheatfield. The name was later changed to Hammondsburgh after Jason Hammond, who settled there in 1810. Later, Jonathan Hale—an early resident of the township—stated “O, call it Jerusalem, Jericho, Bath, or anything but Hammondsburgh!” This led to the adoption of Bath's current name when it was established in 1818. Statewide, other Bath Townships are located in Allen and Greene counties

== Geography ==
Located in the western part of the county, it borders the following townships and cities:

- Richfield Township – north
- Boston Township -– northeast
- Cuyahoga Falls – east
- Akron – southeast
- Copley Township – south
- Sharon Township, Medina County – southwest corner
- Granger Township, Medina County – west
- Hinckley Township, Medina County – northwest corner

Several populated places are located in Bath Township:

- The census-designated place of Montrose-Ghent, occupying the remainder of the southern part of the township, composed of the unincorporated communities of Ghent (in the center of the township) and Montrose (on the southern border with Copley Township)
- The unincorporated area of Hammond's Corners, in the north

Parts of the original Bath Township are now in Akron and Fairlawn.

It occupies most of survey Town 3, Range 12 in the Connecticut Western Reserve and is about 23 square miles (60 km^{2}) in area.

Bath Township contains part of the Cuyahoga Valley National Park, whose main attraction within the township is the Hale Farm & Village, a historical community set in the 1800s.

== Demographics ==
=== 2020 census ===
Bath Township racial composition
Race	Number	Percentage
White (NH)	8,955	89.3%
Black or African American (NH)	197	1.97%
Native American (NH)	6	0.06%
Asian (NH)	312	3.11%
Pacific Islander (NH)	1	0.01%
Other/mixed	553	5.52%

=== 2000 census ===
As of the census of 2000, there were 9,635 people, 3,506 households, and 2,814 families residing in the township. The population density was 418.9 inhabitants per square mile (161.7/km^{2}). There were 3,648 housing units at an average density of 158.6 per square mile (61.2/km^{2}). The racial makeup of the township was 95.41% White, 1.59% African American, 0.04% Native American, 1.90% Asian, 0.11% from other races, and 0.94% from two or more races. Hispanic or Latino of any race were 0.80% of the population.

There were 3,506 households, out of which 34.6% had children under the age of 18 living with them, 42.4% were married couples living together, 4.6% had a female householder with no husband present, and 19.7% were non-families. 17.2% of all households were made up of individuals, and 8.93% had someone living alone who was 65 years of age or older. The average household size was 2.69 and the average family size was 3.06.

In the township the population was spread out, with 25.5% under the age of 18, 2.5% from 20 to 24, 20.5% from 25 to 44, 22.5% from 45 to 64, and 17.0% who were 65 years of age or older. The median age was 44.7 years. For every 100 females there were 89.95 males. For every 100 females age 18 and over, there were 93.6 males.

The median income for a household in the township was $88,899, and the median income for a family was $99,202. Males had a median income of $74,464 versus $43,529 for females. The per capita income for the township was $49,032. About 0.6% of families and 1.3% of the population were below the poverty line, including 0.8% of those under age 18 and 2.7% of those age 65 or over.

== Government ==
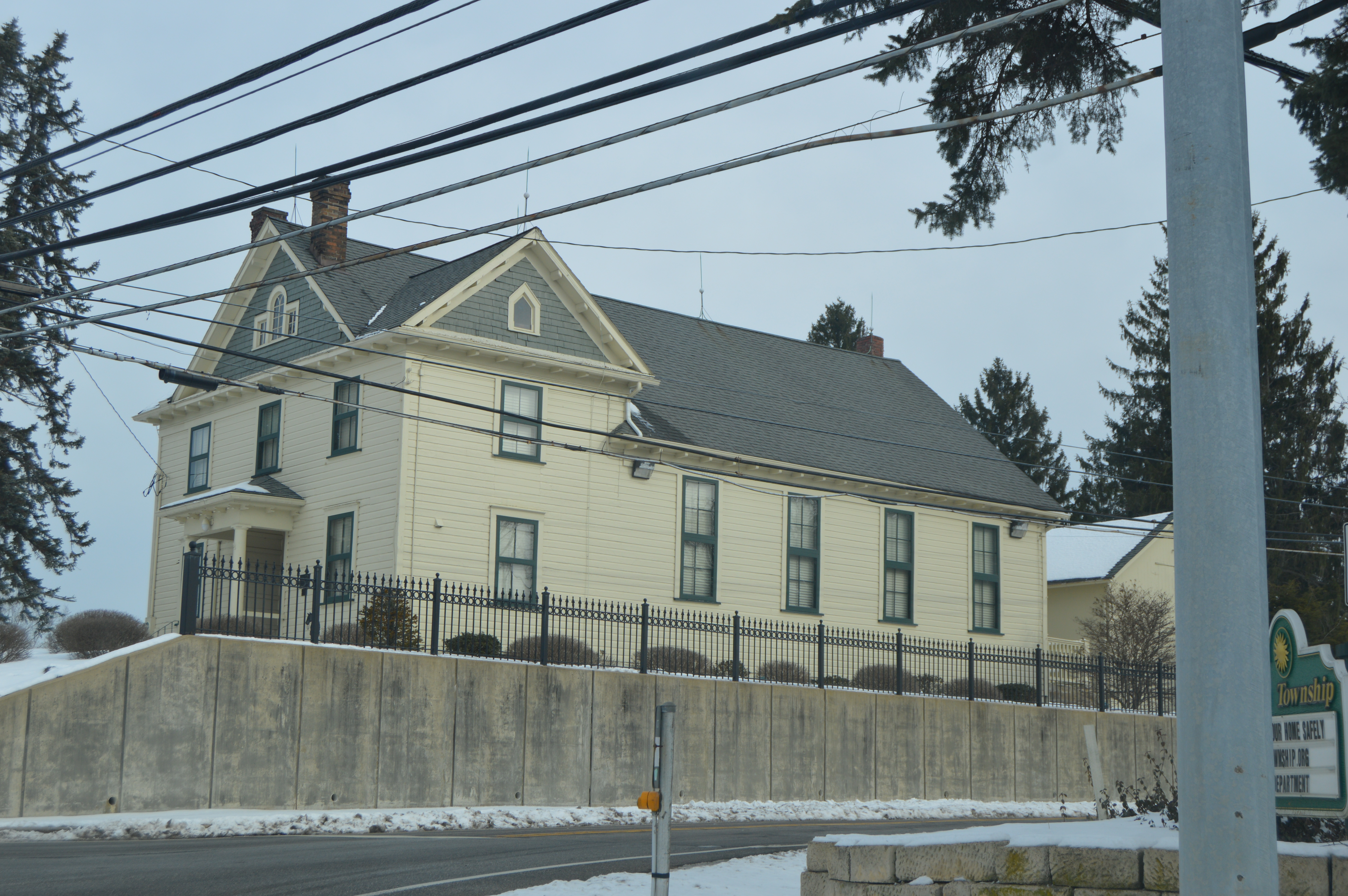
Bath Township Hall

The township is governed by a non-partisan three-member board of trustees, who are elected in November of odd-numbered years to a four-year term beginning on the following January 1. Two are elected in the year after the presidential election and one is elected in the year before it. There is also an elected township fiscal officer, who serves a four-year term beginning on April 1 of the year after the election, which is held in November of the year before the presidential election. Vacancies in the fiscal officership or on the board of trustees are filled by the remaining trustees. In 2024, the board was composed of president Elaina Goodrich and members Sharon Troike and Sean Gaffney, and the fiscal officer was Laura Tuttle. Vito Sinopoli was named Township Administrator on October 23, 2012.

Major court cases are handled by the Summit County court system and minor ones by the Akron Municipal Court.

Bath Township is served by its own police and fire departments.

== Infrastructure ==
=== Transportation ===
Bath Township has access to Interstate 77 at two points. There is a full cloverleaf that the township shares with Copley Township at the intersection with State Route 18. There is also an exit at Ghent Road. I-77 has rest areas on both sides in the northern part of the township. Interstate 271 passes through the township's northwest corner without providing access. Bath Township is served by two state highways: State Route 18 follows the western part of the original southern edge of the township, while State Route 21 shares Interstate 77 on a mostly north–south path through the township.

== Education ==
Most of Bath Township is in the Revere Local School District, with part of the township being in the Copley-Fairlawn City School District. The portion that is in the Revere district is also in the Cuyahoga Valley Joint Vocational School District. (Summit County Fiscal Officer, 2005). Old Trail School, an independent co-ed day school is situated in Cuyahoga Valley National Park.

== Arts and Culture ==
=== Bath Nature Preserve ===
In 1997 and 1998, a 404-acre (1.63 km^{2}) former Firestone property was purchased by Bath Township and named Bath Nature Preserve. It contains grasslands, wetlands, ponds, streams, and mesophytic and riparian deciduous forests, which has through an agreement been used by The University of Akron as a research station. It is used in ecology and biology research, and field trips are taken there by many biology classes to observe animals and collect samples for herbaria. A map of the habitats in Bath Nature Preserve can be found here, and a list of species found and identified in the preserve can be found here.

=== Hale Farm and Village ===
Hale Farm and Village is a historic property of the Western Reserve Historical Society in Bath Township, Summit County, Ohio, United States. It is within the boundaries of the Cuyahoga Valley National Park. Hale Farm was the original homestead of Jonathan Hale, a Connecticut farmer who migrated to the Western Reserve in 1810. In 1973 Hale Farm was listed on the National Register of Historic Places as the Jonathan Hale Homestead. The Hale House was built in 1825.

== Notable residents ==
- Jeffrey Dahmer, serial killer (1960–1994)
- Lionel Dahmer, research chemist and author, father of serial killer Jeffrey Dahmer
- LeBron James (1984), basketball player for the Philadelphia 76ers
