= Montrose, Ohio =

Unincorporated community in Ohio, U.S.

Coordinates: 41°08′08″N 81°38′14″W

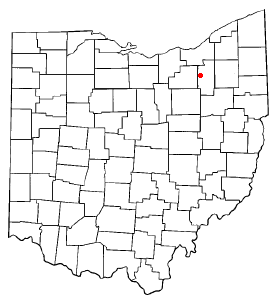
Location of Montrose, Ohio

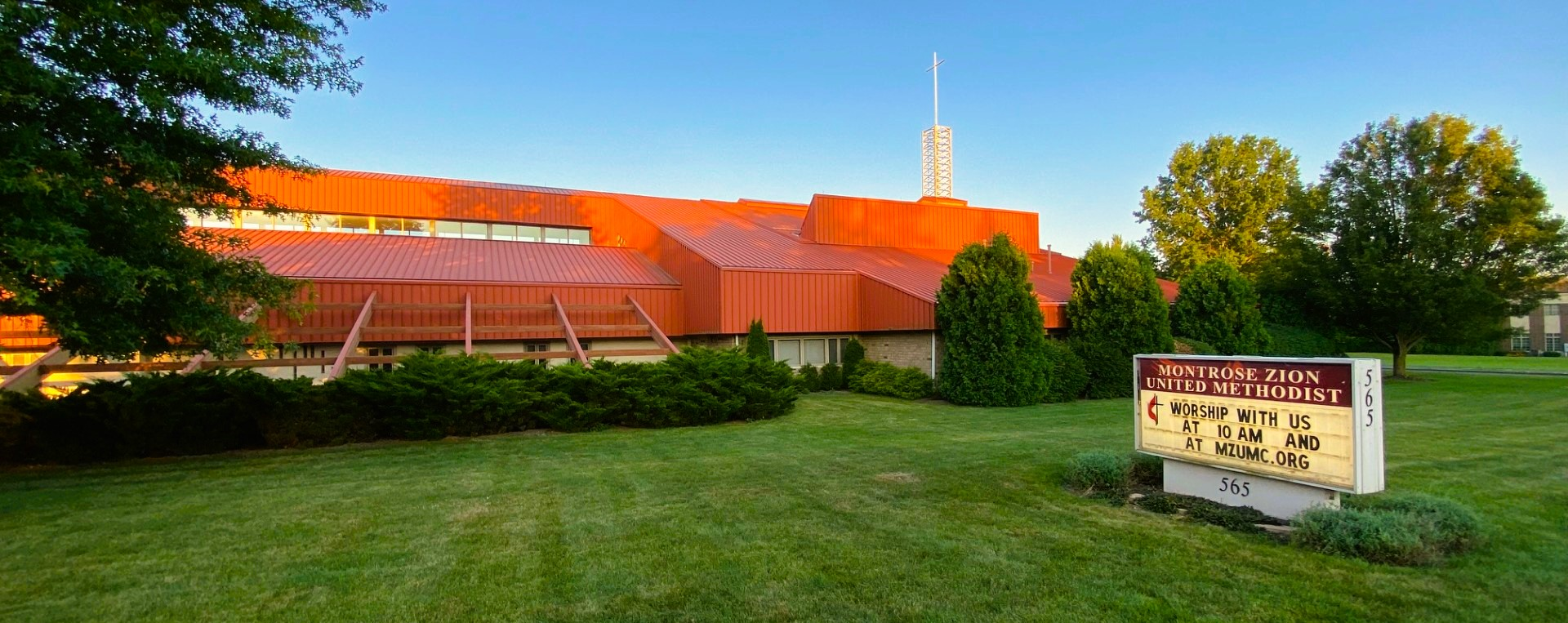
Methodist Church in Montrose, Ohio 2024

Montrose is an unincorporated community on the border between Bath Township, Copley Township, and the city of Fairlawn in Summit County, Ohio, United States. It is an area of restaurants, stores, and businesses located along a stretch of State Route 18 near Interstate 77. The community is served by the Fairlawn (44333) post office. It is included in the Montrose-Ghent census-designated place. It had been a quiet hamlet for much of its history, with such establishments as a drive-in theater, golf courses, and a church. It became a busy retail area in the 1990s as new commercial development moved in.

Montrose was originally called Latta's Corners and then Ellis' Corners. The community first developed around a tavern built by one Mr. Latta. A post office called Montrose was established in 1849, and remained in operation until 1911. The present name most likely is derived from wild roses near the elevated town site.
