= Ghent, Ohio =

Ghent
- Unincorporated community
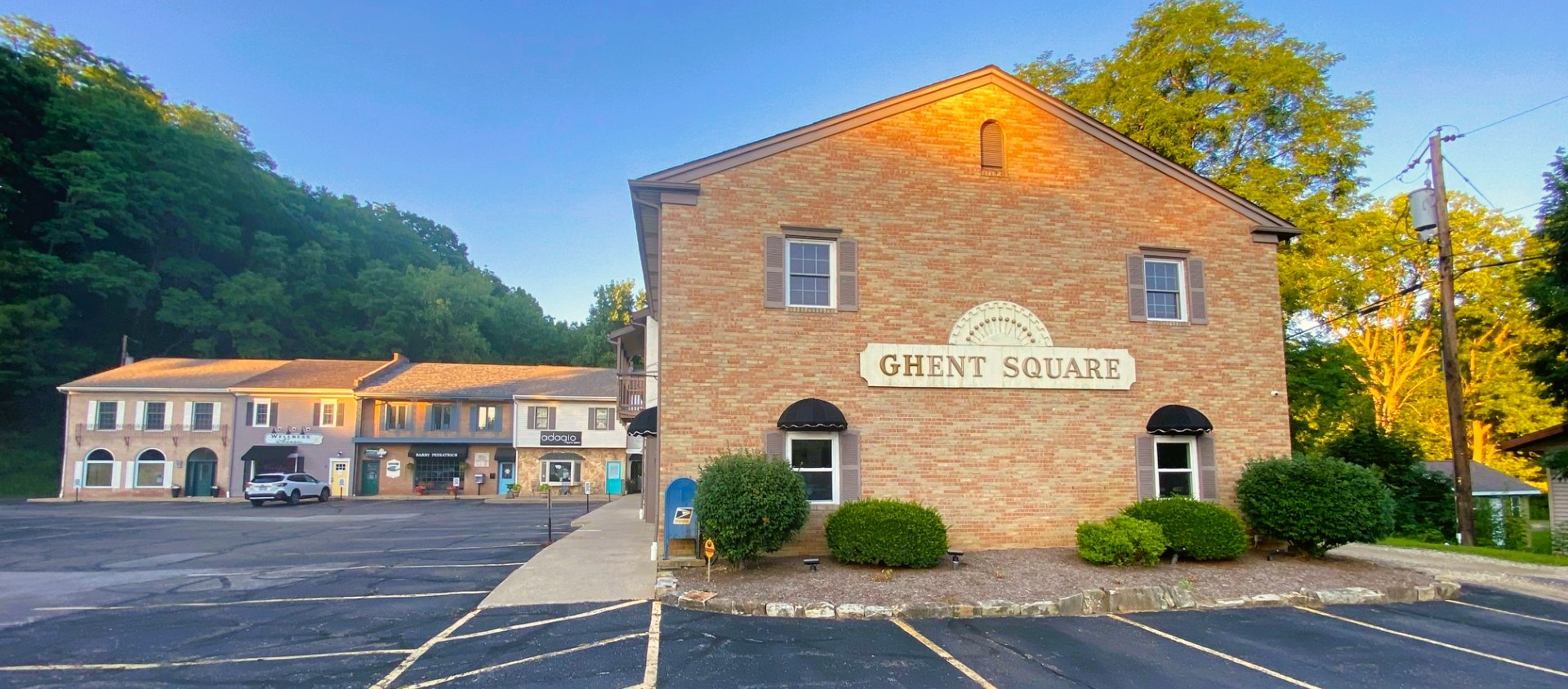

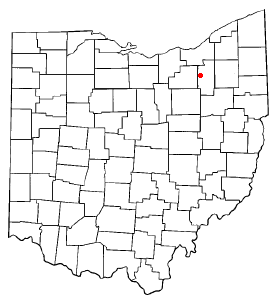
- Location of Ghent, Ohio
- Coordinates: 41°09′30″N 81°38′12″W
- Country: United States
- State: Ohio
- County: Summit
- Named after: Treaty of Ghent
- Elevation: 915 ft (279 m)
- Time zone: UTC-5 (Eastern (EST))
  - Summer (DST): UTC-4 (EDT)
- ZIP codes: 44333
- Area code: 330/234
- GNIS feature ID: 1048779

Ghent /ˈdʒɛnt/ is an unincorporated community in central Bath Township, Summit County, Ohio, United States. It lies in the area of Granger and Cleveland-Massillon roads, just north of the Ghent Road exit of Interstate 77. It is included in the Montrose-Ghent census-designated place.

Today, it has a number of local businesses such a gas station, restaurants, a bakery and dental office.

== History ==
1891 Plat of Ghent, Ohio

As early as 1815, the village of Ghent had several mills powered by Yellow Creek. Several families had settled at Ghent by 1818. A post office called Ghent was established in 1858, and remained in operation until 1918. The community's name most likely commemorates the Treaty of Ghent.
