= Montrose-Ghent, Ohio =

- CDP
- Location in Summit County and the state of Ohio.
- Coordinates: 41°09′17″N 81°37′35″W
- Country: United States
- State: Ohio
- County: Summit

Area
  - Total: 9.50 sq mi (24.61 km^{2})
  - Land: 9.40 sq mi (24.34 km^{2})
  - Water: 0.10 sq mi (0.27 km^{2})
- Elevation: 1,020 ft (310 m)

Population (2020)
  - Total: 5,254
  - Density: 559.1/sq mi (215.87/km^{2})
- Time zone: UTC-5 (Eastern (EST))
  - Summer (DST): UTC-4 (EDT)
- FIPS code: 39-51816
- GNIS feature ID: 2393137

Montrose-Ghent is a census-designated place (CDP) in Summit County, Ohio, United States, composed of the unincorporated communities of Montrose and Ghent. The population was 5,254 at the 2020 census. It is part of the Akron Metropolitan Statistical Area.

== Geography ==
According to the United States Census Bureau, the CDP has a total area of 9.5 square miles (25 km^{2}), of which 9.4 square miles (24 km^{2}) is land and 0.1 square miles (0.26 km^{2}) (0.95%) is water.

== Demographics ==
Historical population
Census	Pop.	Note	%±
1990	4,906		—
2000	5,261		7.2%
2020	5,254		—
U.S. Decennial Census

As of the census of 2000, there were 5,261 people, 1,920 households, and 1,591 families residing in the CDP. The population density was 558.4 inhabitants per square mile (215.6/km^{2}). There were 1,987 housing units at an average density of 210.9 per square mile (81.4/km^{2}). The racial makeup of the CDP was 96.52% White, 0.87% African American, 0.08% Native American, 1.84% Asian, 0.06% from other races, and 0.63% from two or more races. Hispanic or Latino of any race were 0.57% of the population.

There were 1,920 households, out of which 34.7% had children under the age of 18 living with them, 76.8% were married couples living together, 3.9% had a female householder with no husband present, and 17.1% were non-families. 14.0% of all households were made up of individuals, and 5.2% had someone living alone who was 65 years of age or older. The average household size was 2.70 and the average family size was 2.99.

In the CDP the population was spread out, with 25.1% under the age of 18, 4.4% from 18 to 24, 19.3% from 25 to 44, 35.3% from 45 to 64, and 15.9% who were 65 years of age or older. The median age was 46 years. For every 100 females there were 100.3 males. For every 100 females age 18 and over, there were 98.5 males.

The median income for a household in the CDP was $102,353, and the median income for a family was $118,906. Males had a median income of $75,000 versus $43,897 for females. The per capita income for the CDP was $56,423. None of the families and 0.7% of the population were living below the poverty line, including no under eighteens and 1.8% of those over 64.
