= Summit County, Ohio =

County in Ohio, United States

- County
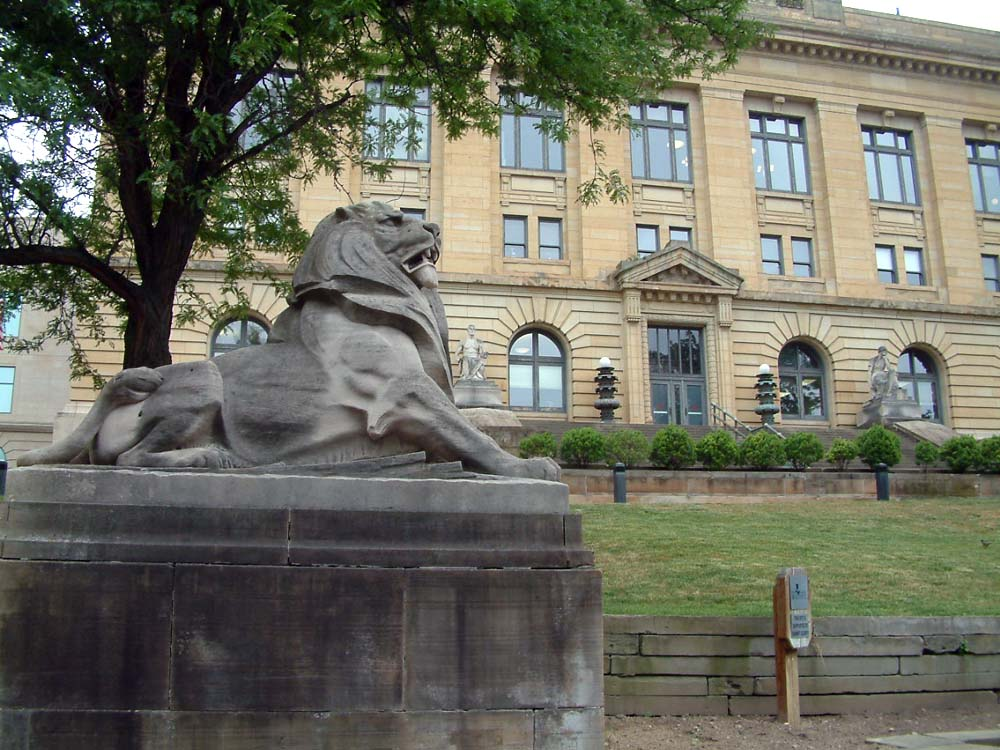
- Summit County Courthouse

- Flag Seal

- Location within the U.S. state of Ohio
- Coordinates: 41°08′N 81°32′W
- Country: United States
- State: Ohio
- Founded: March 3, 1840
- Named for: the highest elevation on the Ohio and Erie Canal
- Seat: Akron
- Largest city: Akron

Government
  - County Executive: Ilene Shapiro (D)

Area
  - Total: 419.38 sq mi (1,086.2 km^{2})
  - Land: 412.08 sq mi (1,067.3 km^{2})
  - Water: 7.3 sq mi (19 km^{2}) 1.7%

Population (2020)
  - Total: 540,428
  - Estimate (2025): 538,376 ▼
  - Density: 1,311.5/sq mi (506.36/km^{2})
- Time zone: UTC−5 (Eastern)
  - Summer (DST): UTC−4 (EDT)
- Congressional district: 13th
- Website: co.summitoh.net

Summit County is an urban county located in the northeast region of the U.S. state of Ohio. As of the 2020 census, the population was 540,428, making it the fourth-most populous county in Ohio. Its county seat and most populous city is Akron. The county was formed on March 3, 1840, from portions of Medina, Portage and Stark counties. It was named Summit County because the highest elevation on the Ohio and Erie Canal is in the county. Summit County is part of the Akron, OH Metropolitan Statistical Area, which is also included in the Cleveland-Akron-Canton, OH Combined Statistical Area.

== Geography ==
According to the United States Census Bureau, the county has a total area of 419.38 square miles (1,086 km^{2}), of which 412.08 square miles (1,067 km^{2}) is land and 7.3 square miles (19 km^{2}) (1.7%) is water. The largest portion of Cuyahoga Valley National Park is in the northern part of the county. The southern border of the former Connecticut Western Reserve passes through the southern part of the county, leading to jogs in the east and west borders of the county.

=== Major highways ===
- I-76
- I-77
- I-80 / Ohio Turnpike
- I-271
- I-277
- I-480
- US 224
- SR 8
- SR 18
- SR 21
- SR 59
- SR 82
- SR 91
- SR 93
- SR 162
- SR 176
- SR 236
- SR 241
- SR 261
- SR 303
- SR 585
- SR 619
- SR 764

=== Adjacent counties ===
- Cuyahoga County – northwest
- Geauga County – northeast
- Portage County – east
- Stark County – south
- Wayne County – southwest
- Medina County – west

=== National protected area ===
- Cuyahoga Valley National Park (also extends north into Cuyahoga County)

== Demographics ==
Historical population
Census	Pop.	Note	%±
1840	22,560		—
1850	27,485		21.8%
1860	27,344		−0.5%
1870	34,674		26.8%
1880	43,788		26.3%
1890	54,089		23.5%
1900	71,715		32.6%
1910	108,253		50.9%
1920	286,065		164.3%
1930	344,131		20.3%
1940	339,405		−1.4%
1950	410,032		20.8%
1960	513,569		25.3%
1970	553,371		7.8%
1980	524,472		−5.2%
1990	514,990		−1.8%
2000	542,899		5.4%
2010	541,781		−0.2%
2020	540,428		−0.2%
2025 (est.)	538,376	▼	−0.4%
U.S. Decennial Census; 1790-1960 1900-1990; 1990-2000 2010-2020

=== 2020 census ===
As of the 2020 census, the county had a population of 540,428. The median age was 41.6 years, 20.7% of residents were under the age of 18, and 19.0% of residents were 65 years of age or older. For every 100 females there were 94.4 males, and for every 100 females age 18 and over there were 92.0 males age 18 and over.

The racial makeup of the county was 74.2% White, 14.8% Black or African American, 0.2% American Indian and Alaska Native, 4.2% Asian, <0.1% Native Hawaiian and Pacific Islander, 1.0% from some other race, and 5.7% from two or more races. Hispanic or Latino residents of any race comprised 2.4% of the population.

96.2% of residents lived in urban areas, while 3.8% lived in rural areas.

There were 228,761 households in the county, of which 26.3% had children under the age of 18 living in them. Of all households, 42.7% were married-couple households, 19.9% were households with a male householder and no spouse or partner present, and 30.2% were households with a female householder and no spouse or partner present. About 32.2% of all households were made up of individuals and 13.2% had someone living alone who was 65 years of age or older.

There were 246,473 housing units, of which 7.2% were vacant. Among occupied housing units, 65.8% were owner-occupied and 34.2% were renter-occupied. The homeowner vacancy rate was 1.4% and the rental vacancy rate was 7.7%.

=== Racial and ethnic composition ===
Summit County, Ohio – Racial and ethnic composition Note: the US Census treats Hispanic/Latino as an ethnic category. This table excludes Latinos from the racial categories and assigns them to a separate category. Hispanics/Latinos may be of any race.
Race / Ethnicity (NH = Non-Hispanic)	Pop 1980	Pop 1990	Pop 2000	Pop 2010	Pop 2020	% 1980	% 1990	% 2000	% 2010	% 2020
White alone (NH)	461,122	444,821	450,620	431,624	397,536	87.92%	86.37%	83.00%	79.67%	73.56%
Black or African American alone (NH)	56,418	60,846	71,218	77,373	78,922	10.76%	11.81%	13.12%	14.28%	14.60%
Native American or Alaska Native alone (NH)	602	1,021	997	901	777	0.11%	0.20%	0.18%	0.17%	0.14%
Asian alone (NH)	2,341	4,906	7,604	11,841	22,506	0.45%	0.95%	1.40%	2.19%	4.16%
Native Hawaiian or Pacific Islander alone (NH)	x	x	90	118	149	x	x	0.02%	0.02%	0.03%
Other race alone (NH)	1,257	379	610	755	2,096	0.24%	0.07%	0.11%	0.14%	0.39%
Mixed race or Multiracial (NH)	x	x	6,979	10,509	25,236	x	x	1.29%	1.94%	4.67%
Hispanic or Latino (any race)	2,732	3,017	4,781	8,660	13,206	0.52%	0.59%	0.88%	1.60%	2.44%
Total	524,472	514,990	542,899	541,781	540,428	100.00%	100.00%	100.00%	100.00%	100.00%

=== 2010 census ===
As of the census of 2010, there were 541,781 people, 222,781 households, and 141,110 families residing in the county. The population density was 1,312.6 inhabitants per square mile (506.8/km^{2}). There were 245,109 housing units at an average density of 593.8 per square mile (229.3/km^{2}). The racial makeup of the county was 80.6% white, 14.4% black or African American, 2.2% Asian, 0.2% American Indian, 0.5% from other races, and 2.1% from two or more races. Those of Hispanic or Latino origin made up 1.6% of the population. In terms of ancestry, 24.9% were German, 15.3% were Irish, 10.6% were English, 10.1% were Italian, 5.1% were Polish, and 4.5% were American.

Of the 222,781 households, 29.8% had children under the age of 18 living with them, 45.3% were married couples living together, 13.6% had a female householder with no husband present, 36.7% were non-families, and 30.0% of all households were made up of individuals. The average household size was 2.39 and the average family size was 2.98. The median age was 40.0 years.

The median income for a household in the county was $47,926 and the median income for a family was $62,271. Males had a median income of $47,892 versus $35,140 for females. The per capita income for the county was $26,676. About 10.0% of families and 13.8% of the population were below the poverty line, including 19.8% of those under age 18 and 8.0% of those age 65 or over.

== Government ==
Summit County, along with Cuyahoga County, is one of two of Ohio's 88 counties that have a charter government, as authorized by Article X of the Ohio Constitution. Under its charter, rather than three elected commissioners, Summit County has an elected county executive and an eleven-member county council. Eight members of the council are elected from individual districts; the other three are elected at large. Summit County also has an appointed medical examiner rather than an elected coroner, and an elected fiscal officer, who exercises the powers and performs the duties of a county auditor, treasurer and recorder. The remaining officials are similar to the officials in other counties. They include the following:

- Clerk of courts – Tavia Galonski (D) (elected)
- Prosecuting attorney – Elliot Kolkovich (D) (elected)
- Engineer – Alan Brubaker (D) (elected)
- Sheriff – Kandy Fatheree (D) (elected)
- Fiscal officer – Kristen Scalise (D) (elected)

Summit County currently has 14 Common Pleas judges. They are:

- Kelly McLaughlin (D),
- Kathryn Michael (D),
- Christine Croce (R),
- Jennifer Towell (D),
- Alison McCarty (R),
- Tammy O'Brien (R),
- Joy Oldfield (D),
- Mary Margaret Rowlands (D),
- Alison Breaux (D)
- Susan Baker Ross (D)
- Linda Tucci Teodosio (D) (Juvenile Court Judge)
- Katarina Cook (R) (Domestic Relations Judge)
- Kani Hightower (D) (Domestic Relations Judge)
- Elinore Marsh Stormer (D) (Probate Judge)

=== Summit County Council ===
Summit County has an 11-member council. Three members are elected at-large in midterm cycles, while eight members are elected from districts coinciding with the presidential election. The current members of Summit County Council are:

- Erin Dickinson (D) (at-large)
- Elizabeth Walters* (D) (at-large)
- John Donofrio (D) (at-large)
- Rita Darrow (D) (District 1)
- John Schmidt (D) (District 2)
- David Licate (D) (District 3)
- Jeff Wilhite (D) (District 4)
- Brandon Ford (D) (District 5)
- Christine Higham (D) (District 6)
- Beth McKenney (R) (District 7)
- Joseph Kacyon (R) (District 8)

* Indicates Council President

=== County Executives ===
- John R. Morgan, 1981–1989
- Tim Davis, 1989–2001
- James B. McCarthy (D), 2001–2007
- Russell M. Pry (D), 2007-2016
- Ilene Shapiro (D), 2016–present

== Politics ==
Like much of Northeast Ohio, Summit is heavily Democratic. It has voted Republican only three times since 1932, all in national Republican landslides– Dwight D. Eisenhower's 1956 victory, and the 49-state sweeps by Richard Nixon and Ronald Reagan in 1972 and 1984, respectively.
Summit County is located in Ohio's 13th congressional district, currently represented by Democrat Emilia Sykes.

United States presidential election results for Summit County, Ohio
Year	Republican		Democratic		Third party(ies)	
Year	No.	%	No.	%	No.	%
1856	3,185	63.64%	1,746	34.89%	74	1.48%
1860	3,607	65.52%	1,785	32.43%	113	2.05%
1864	4,204	69.88%	1,812	30.12%	0	0.00%
1868	4,634	65.47%	2,444	34.53%	0	0.00%
1872	4,534	62.01%	2,738	37.45%	40	0.55%
1876	5,055	56.59%	3,804	42.59%	73	0.82%
1880	5,890	57.73%	4,071	39.90%	241	2.36%
1884	6,588	55.97%	4,586	38.96%	597	5.07%
1888	6,455	51.43%	5,495	43.78%	602	4.80%
1892	6,322	46.45%	6,499	47.75%	790	5.80%
1896	8,584	51.25%	8,020	47.88%	146	0.87%
1900	10,072	53.08%	8,413	44.33%	491	2.59%
1904	12,451	66.04%	4,618	24.49%	1,786	9.47%
1908	10,365	47.31%	9,930	45.32%	1,614	7.37%
1912	3,502	15.10%	7,786	33.57%	11,904	51.33%
1916	11,593	35.63%	19,343	59.45%	1,603	4.93%
1920	43,721	59.60%	27,857	37.97%	1,785	2.43%
1924	53,774	65.28%	17,533	21.29%	11,064	13.43%
1928	78,504	70.86%	31,506	28.44%	775	0.70%
1932	47,691	45.03%	53,965	50.95%	4,255	4.02%
1936	38,991	29.16%	91,836	68.69%	2,869	2.15%
1940	63,405	41.45%	89,555	58.55%	0	0.00%
1944	64,696	41.61%	90,783	58.39%	0	0.00%
1948	60,174	42.69%	78,096	55.41%	2,680	1.90%
1952	91,168	48.34%	97,443	51.66%	0	0.00%
1956	102,872	52.42%	93,378	47.58%	0	0.00%
1960	109,066	49.59%	110,852	50.41%	0	0.00%
1964	68,000	32.33%	142,319	67.67%	0	0.00%
1968	82,649	39.56%	100,068	47.89%	26,224	12.55%
1972	112,419	49.92%	108,534	48.19%	4,263	1.89%
1976	80,415	38.41%	123,711	59.09%	5,224	2.50%
1980	92,299	43.35%	102,459	48.12%	18,161	8.53%
1984	115,637	50.99%	109,569	48.32%	1,574	0.69%
1988	101,155	46.92%	112,612	52.23%	1,822	0.85%
1992	77,530	32.10%	107,881	44.67%	56,081	23.22%
1996	73,555	34.18%	112,050	52.07%	29,590	13.75%
2000	96,721	43.02%	119,759	53.26%	8,359	3.72%
2004	118,558	42.91%	156,587	56.67%	1,175	0.43%
2008	113,284	40.66%	160,858	57.73%	4,487	1.61%
2012	111,001	41.36%	153,041	57.03%	4,316	1.61%
2016	112,026	43.03%	134,256	51.57%	14,064	5.40%
2020	124,833	44.38%	151,668	53.92%	4,779	1.70%
2024	125,910	45.88%	145,005	52.83%	3,539	1.29%

United States Senate election results for Summit County, Ohio1
Year	Republican		Democratic		Third party(ies)	
Year	No.	%	No.	%	No.	%
2024	111,573	41.13%	150,517	55.49%	9,174	3.38%

== Education ==
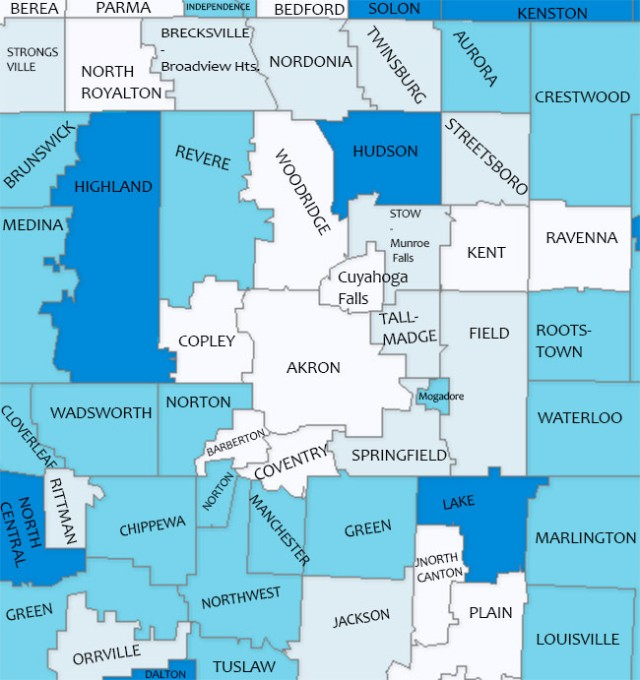
Public School Districts in Summit County and Surrounding Areas

=== Colleges and universities ===
- University of Akron, Akron
- Kent State University Twinsburg Academic Center, Twinsburg
- Stark State College Akron

== Recreation ==
- Summit Metro Parks

== Communities ==
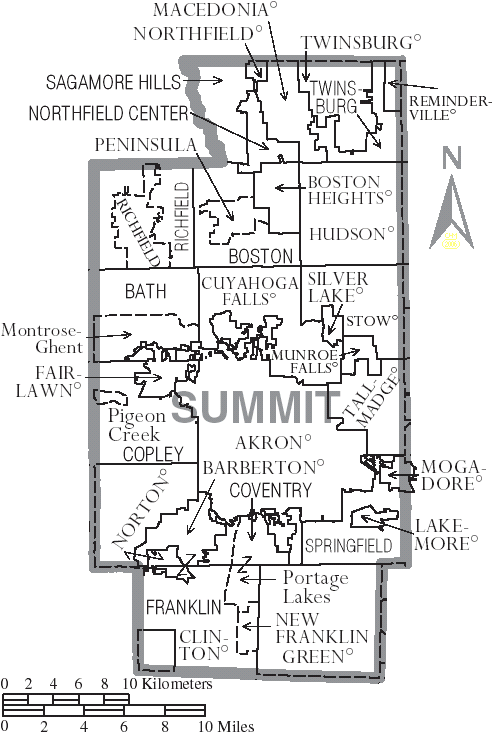
Map of Summit County, Ohio With Municipal and Township Labels. The map denotes New Franklin and Franklin Township as separate entities, predating their 2003 merger.

=== Cities ===
- Akron (county seat)
- Barberton
- Cuyahoga Falls
- Fairlawn
- Green
- Hudson
- Macedonia
- Munroe Falls
- New Franklin
- Norton (partly in Wayne County)
- Stow
- Tallmadge
- Twinsburg

=== Villages ===
- Boston Heights
- Clinton
- Lakemore
- Mogadore
- Northfield
- Peninsula
- Reminderville
- Richfield
- Silver Lake

=== Townships ===
- Bath
- Boston
- Copley
- Coventry
- Northfield Center
- Richfield
- Sagamore Hills
- Springfield
- Twinsburg

=== Defunct townships ===
- Franklin
- Green
- Hudson
- Norton
- Northampton
- Portage
- Stow

=== Census-designated places ===
- Montrose-Ghent
- Pigeon Creek
- Portage Lakes
- Sawyerwood
- Twinsburg Heights

=== Unincorporated communities ===
- Bath
- Boston
- Botzum
- Brandywine
- Comet
- Copley
- Everett
- Ghent
- Greensburg
- Montrose
- Myersville
- Western Star

== See also ==
- National Register of Historic Places listings in Summit County, Ohio
