= Bath, Ohio =

Unincorporated community in Ohio, U.S.

Coordinates: 41°11′20″N 81°38′10″W

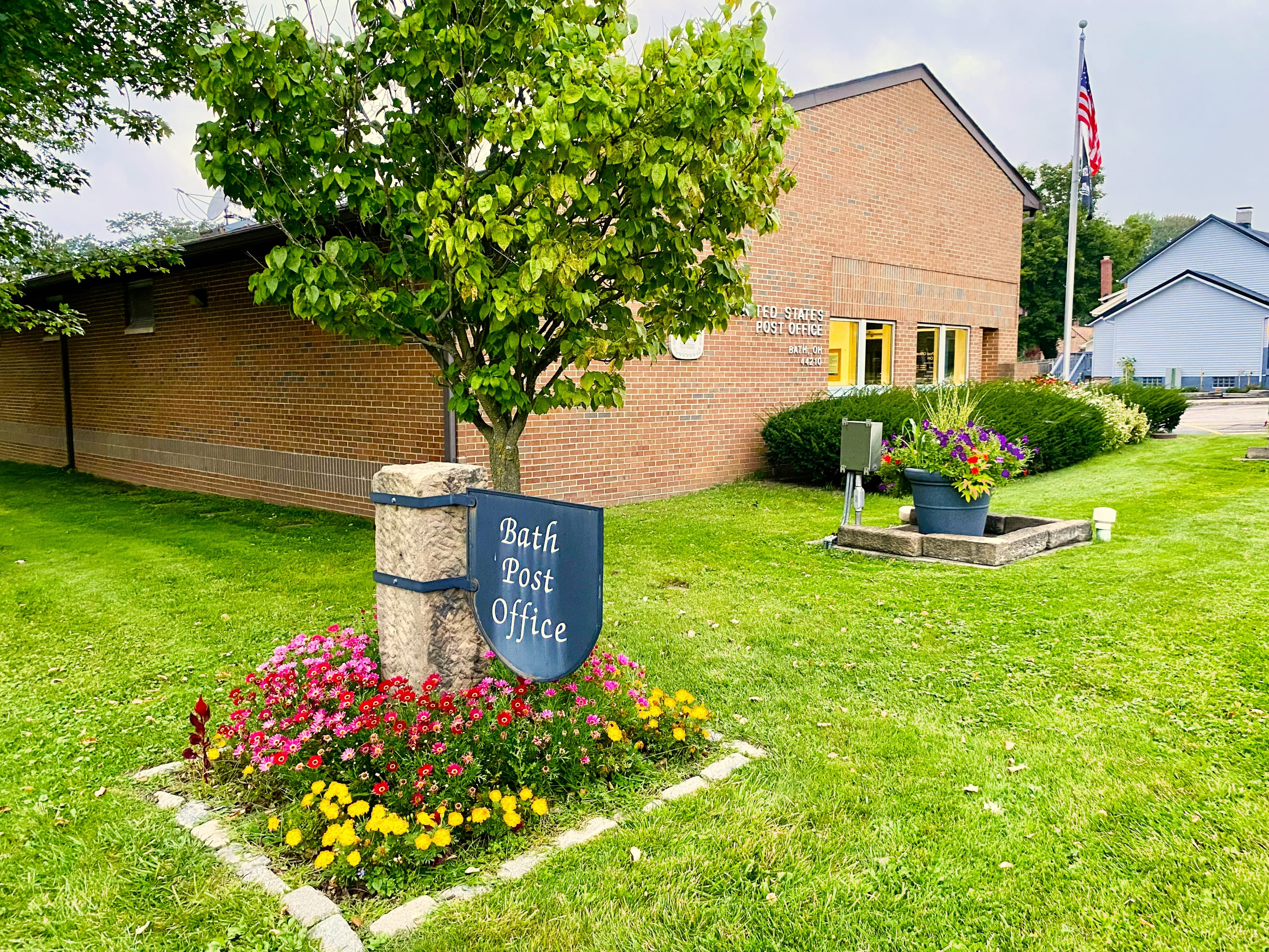
Post Office at the intersection of Ira and Cleveland-Massillon Rd.

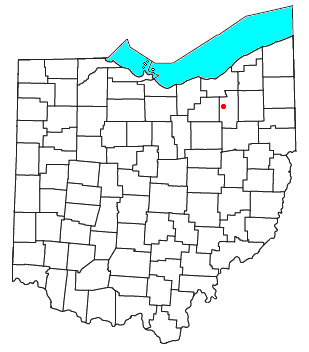
Location of Bath, Ohio

Bath is an unincorporated community in the northern part of Bath Township, Summit County, Ohio, United States. It is centered at the intersection of Cleveland-Massillon and Ira roads. It was developed 'circa 1820.

A post office called Bath has been in operation since 1824. A variant name was "Hammond's Corners", for Jason Hammond, an early settler. Jeffrey Dahmer's family moved here in 1968, the house went up for sale in 2012.

== Notable people ==
Jeffrey Dahmer (May 21, 1960 – November 28, 1994), American serial killer and sex offender who killed and dismembered seventeen males between 1978 and 1991. Many of his later murders involved necrophilia, cannibalism, and the permanent preservation of body parts—typically all or part of the skeleton.

Parker Finn, an American filmmaker, director of Smile and Smile 2.
