= Cuyahoga Valley National Park =

National park in Ohio, United States

- IUCN category II (national park)
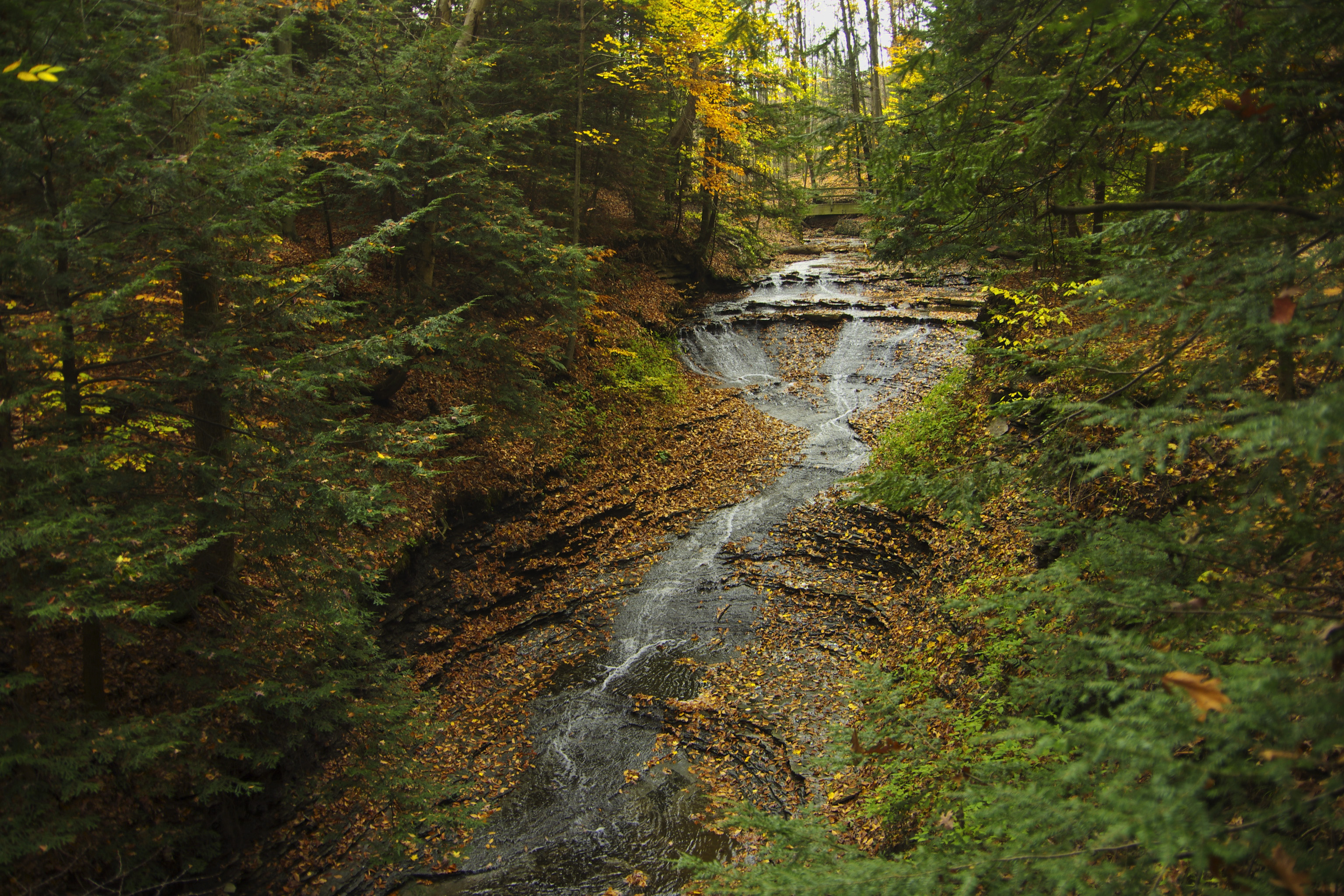
- Waterfalls, such as Bridal Veil Falls, can be found throughout the park.

- Location within Ohio Location within the United States
- Interactive map of Cuyahoga Valley National Park
- Location: Summit County & Cuyahoga County, Ohio, United States
- Nearest city: Cleveland, Akron
- Coordinates: 41°14′30″N 81°32′59″W
- Area: 32,783 acres (51.2 sq mi; 132.7 km^{2})
- Established: October 11, 2000
- Visitors: 2,860,059 (in 2023)
- Governing body: National Park Service
- Website: nps.gov/cuva

Cuyahoga Valley National Park is a national park of the United States in Ohio that reclaims and preserves the industrial, commercial, and rural landscape along the Cuyahoga River between Akron and Cleveland in Northeast Ohio.

The 32,783-acre (51.2 sq mi; 132.7 km^{2}) park is administered by the National Park Service, but within its boundaries are areas independently managed as county parks or as public or private businesses. Cuyahoga Valley was originally designated as a national recreation area (NRA) in 1974, then redesignated as a national park 26 years later in 2000, and remains the only national park that originated as a national recreation area.

Cuyahoga Valley is the only national park in the state of Ohio and one of three in the Great Lakes Basin, with Isle Royale National Park in Lake Superior and Indiana Dunes National Park bordering Lake Michigan. Cuyahoga Valley also differs from the other national parks in the US in that it is adjacent to two large urban areas and it includes a dense road network, a railroad, high tension lines, small towns, commercial businesses, four reservations of the Cleveland Metroparks, four parks and one multipurpose trail of Summit Metro Parks, and public and private attractions. It was the twelfth-most visited American national park in 2023, attracting nearly 2.9 million visitors, primarily due to its proximity to Cleveland and Akron.

There are two in-park lodging locations, Stanford House and the Inn at Brandywine Falls. Camping and overnight parking are prohibited in the park.

== History ==
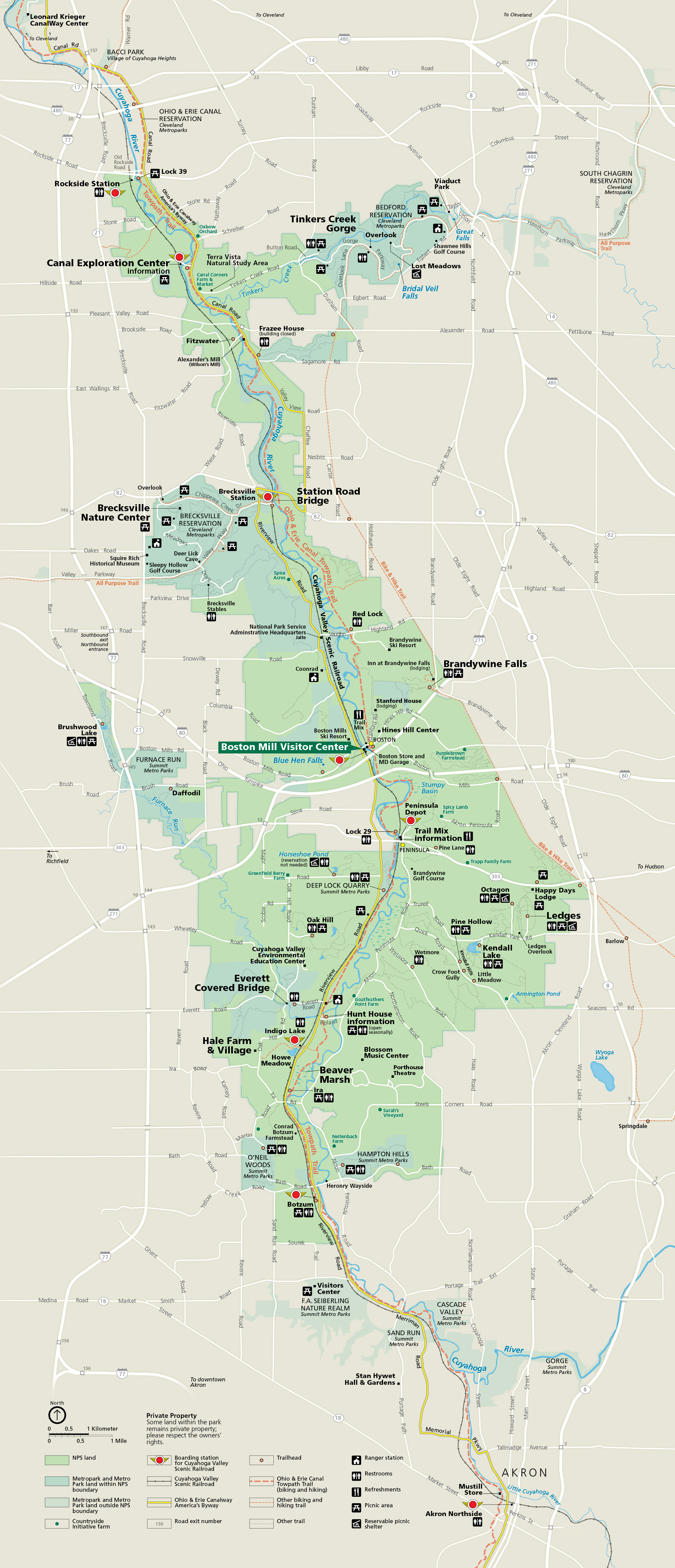
Park map (click on map to enlarge)

=== Indigenous history ===
The Hopewell Culture inhabited the area by ~200AD and constructed the Everett Mound near Everett within the park.

No Native American tribes currently have federal recognition in Ohio; however, the former inhabitants of the Cuyahoga Valley were Native Americans. The Wyandot, Iroquois, Ottawa, Ojibwe, Munsee, Potawatomi, Miami, Catawba, and Shawnee all lived in or traversed this area, but the Lenapé Nation, also known as the Lenape’wàk or Delaware Nation, are considered "the Grandfathers" of many Native Nations of the upper Ohio River Valley. They had a democratic and egalitarian sociopolitical structure where leaders (sachem) consulted elders who advocated for the expectations of the people before decisions were made. The Lenapé were actively involved in long-distance trade networks and were highly skilled at creating goods and art such as pottery, stone weaponry, clothing, and baskets. Wars, coercive treaties, and legislative changes in the eighteenth and nineteenth centuries resulted in Lenapé movement both west and south from their geographic origins in present-day New York City, the lower Hudson Valley, eastern Pennsylvania, New Jersey, and northern Delaware, through the Ohio River Valley and Cuyahoga Valley, to current residencies primarily in Oklahoma and Ontario, Canada. Land was vitally important to the Lenapé Nation. The fur trade required large hunting grounds, as did agriculture, which served as their central food source. As the Lenapé Nation was pushed west, ecological consistencies between present-day Pennsylvania and Ohio allowed them to continue similar agricultural, hunting, and fishing practices; however, as treaties and violent conflicts continued, the Lenapé were not permitted sufficient time to develop a relationship with land in the Ohio River Valley. While being pushed west, the Lenapé turned to each other to form alliances between Lenapé communities to preserve culture, territory, and resources.

The Lenapé’s hunting practices changed with the introduction of the fur trade. After contact with Europeans, the emphasis on hunting began to shift towards the demands of fur production rather than prioritizing sustainability. Because of this shift in Lenapé hunting practices, the populations of beavers and other fur-bearing animals plummeted. These trade networks depended on waterways used by indigenous people through the seventeenth and eighteenth centuries:

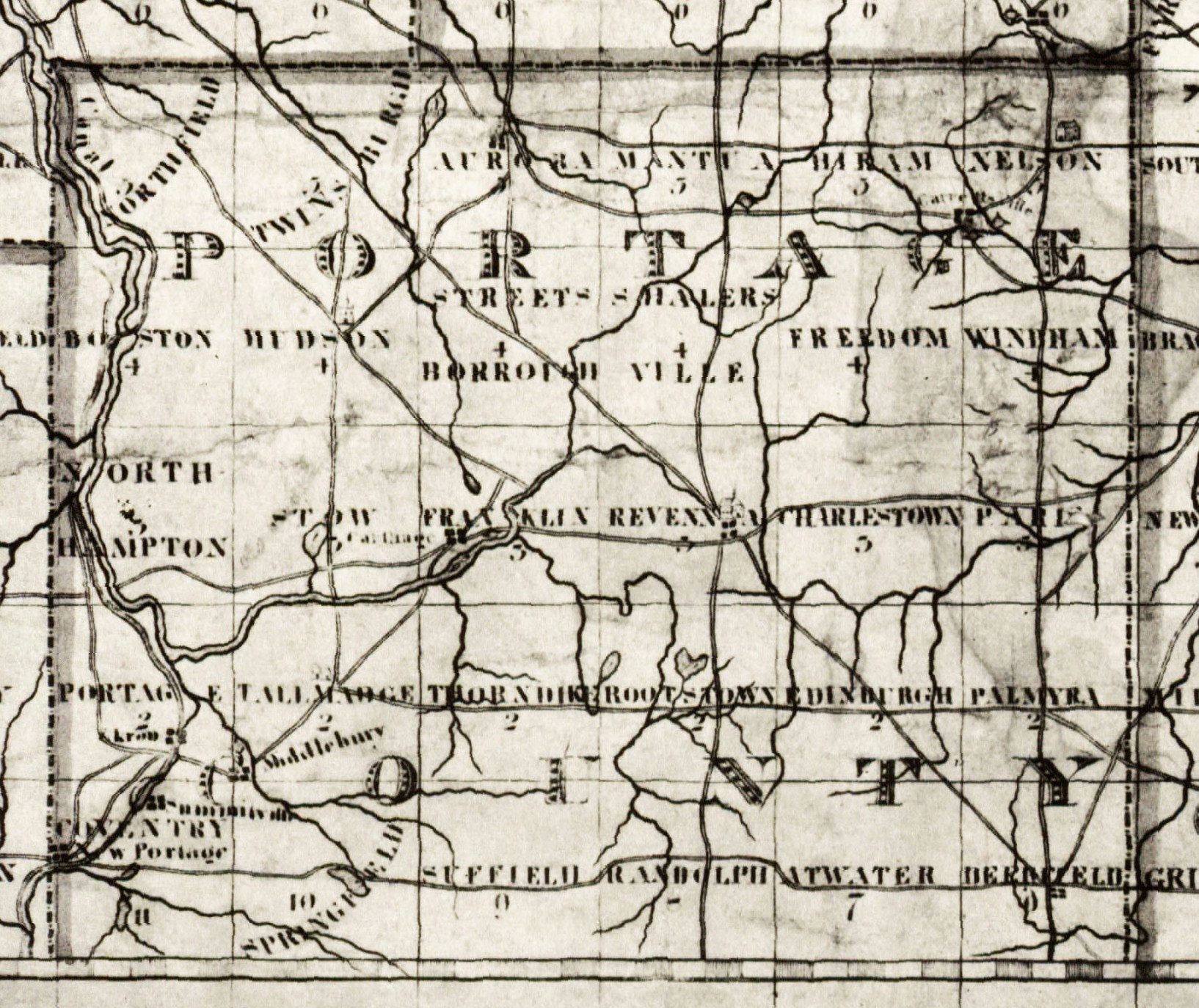
Portage County 1826

Portage Path was located in modern-day Summit County, Ohio. The trail connected the Cuyahoga and Tuscarawas Rivers and was approximately eight miles in length. American Indians used this path to transport their canoes overland from one river to the other. Using canoes, American Indians could travel by water from the Great Lakes to the Gulf of Mexico except for this small section. Today, most of the path is located in the city of Akron, Ohio, although interested parties can follow signs that trace the path between the two rivers. Portage County received its name from Portage Path.

==== Treaties and conflict ====
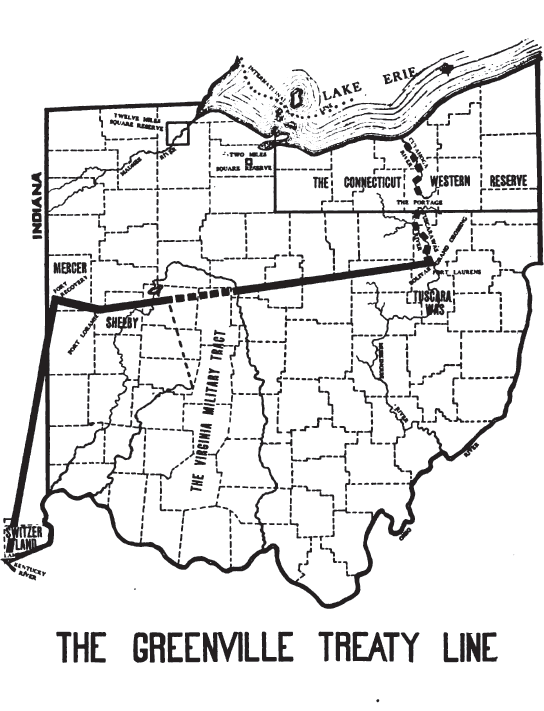
Treaty of Greenville

The Cuyahoga Valley is no longer inhabited by the Lenapé Nation primarily due to coercive legislative processes and numerous violent conflicts. The 1795 Treaty of Greenville set the Cuyahoga River as the boundary between indigenous peoples' lands and European settlement. In 1805, 500,000 acres (200,000 ha) of land, including the present-day Cuyahoga Valley National Park, was ceded in the Treaty of Fort Industry with a promise of a thousand dollar annual payout to each Native Nation that lost land (the Wyandot, Ottawa, Objibwe, Munsee, Lenapé, Potawatomi, and Shawnee). The treaty also included a clause that allowed for the continuation of indigenous hunting on the ceded land; however, that portion of the treaty was neglected in practice. Other treaties, also took Lenapé land without their full knowledge or consent. Today, the Lenapé Nation is more commonly referred to as the Delaware Nation and has its headquarters in Oklahoma, although there are also populations in Kansas, Wisconsin, and Ontario, Canada, as well as in their ancestral homelands, including Pennsylvania, New Jersey, and Delaware.

=== Later history ===
The valley began providing recreation for urban dwellers in the 1870s when people came from nearby cities for carriage rides or leisure boat trips along the canal. In 1880, the Valley Railway became another way to escape urban industrial life. Actual park development began in the 1910s and 1920s with the establishment of Cleveland and Akron metropolitan park districts. In 1929, the estate of Cleveland businessman Hayward Kendall donated 430 acres (0.7 sq mi; 1.7 km^{2}) around the Ritchie Ledges and a trust fund to the state of Ohio. Kendall's will stipulated that the "property should be perpetually used for park purposes". The area was called Virginia Kendall Park, in honor of his mother. In the 1930s, the Civilian Conservation Corps built much of the park's infrastructure including the Happy Days Lodge and the shelters at Octagon, the Ledges, and Kendall Lake. The Happy Days Lodge, near Peninsula, was constructed from 1938 to 1939 as a camp for urban children. The lodge is presently used only as a special events site.

=== Park creation ===
Although the regional parks safeguarded certain places, by the 1960s local citizens feared that urban sprawl would overwhelm the Cuyahoga Valley's natural beauty. An additional concern was the environmental degradation of the Cuyahoga River via factory waste and sewage, along with fires that burned on the river in 1952 and 1969. Citizens joined forces with state and national government staff to find a long-term solution. Finally, on December 27, 1974, President Gerald Ford signed the bill establishing the Cuyahoga Valley National Recreation Area, even as the administration recommended a veto because "The Cuyahoga Valley possesses no qualities which qualify it for inclusion in the National Park System" and the government was already providing funds for outdoor recreation.

After Congress authorized the land acquisition, it was left under the direction of Superintendent William C. Birdsell of the National Park Service and the Army Corps of Engineers . Under the direction of Birdsell, homes were either purchased outright, or given a scenic/preservation easement. There was no comprehensive plan to guide the land acquisition program, so the responsibility of choosing whether homes were to be purchased or preserved was solely Birdsell's decision. Birdsell's continually changing priorities frustrated local residents as land acquisition plans changed, and his management style was criticized by the National Park Service's Midwest Regional Office during a 1978 operational evaluation report (OER), citing his poor human-resource management skills, low staff morale, and Birdsell's inability to delegate.

=== National Park Service ===
The National Park Service acquired the 47-acre (0.1 sq mi; 0.2 km^{2}) Krejci Dump in 1985 to include as part of the recreation area. They requested a thorough analysis of the site's contents from the Environmental Protection Agency. After the survey identified extremely toxic materials, the area was closed in 1986 and designated a superfund site under the Comprehensive Environmental Response, Compensation and Liability Act (CERCLA) of 1980. Litigation was filed against potentially responsible parties: Ford, General Motors, Chrysler, 3M, Waste Management, Chevron, Kewanee Industries, and Federal Metals. Only 3M would not agree to a settlement, and the company lost at trial. Removal of toxic materials began in 1987 with 371,000 short tons (740 million lb; 337 million kg) of contaminated soils and debris removed by 2012, and restoration completed by 2015.

The area was redesignated a national park by Congress on October 11, 2000, with the passage of the Department of the Interior and Related Agencies Appropriations Act, 2001, House Bill 4578, 106th Congress. The park is administered by the National Park Service. The David Berger National Memorial in Beachwood, a Cleveland suburb, is also managed through Cuyahoga Valley National Park.

The Richfield Coliseum, a multipurpose arena in the Cuyahoga River area, was demolished in 1999 and the vacant site became part of Cuyahoga Valley National Park upon its designation in 2000. The area has since become a grassy meadow that is a popular birdwatching site.

In 2024, Cuyahoga Valley National Park entered into a "sister park" agreement with Dartmoor National Park in Devon, England, with a focus on collaborating to improve conservation efforts. The agreement is the first of its kind between the National Park Service and an English national park.

== Wildlife ==
=== Fauna ===
Animals found in the park are animals typical throughout Ohio, including raccoons, muskrats, coyotes, skunks, red foxes, beavers, peregrine falcons, river otters, bald eagles, opossums, three species of moles, white-tailed deer, Canada geese, gray foxes, minks, great blue herons, and seven species of bats. Reptiles include eight species of turtle, including painted turtles, and eleven species of snakes, including black rat snakes. Amphibians such as salamander, toad, and newt are also present.

=== Flora ===
Cuyahoga Valley National Park is known to have maples, oaks, pines, juniper, yew, magnolias, tulip trees, spruces, hemlocks and sycamores. Grass is found in more open areas and includes Kentucky bluegrass, black bentgrass, redtop, annual ryegrass, timothy, Phragmites, velvet grass, poverty grass, switchgrass and bromegrass among others. Sedges like Golden-fruited sedge, fox sedge and needle spikerush can be found near water. Flowers likespring beauty, yellow trout lily, toothwort, hepatica, bloodroot, dwarf ginseng, Virginia bluebells, spring cress, purple cress, rue anemone, foam flower, twin leaf, bishop's cap, squirrel corn, violets and jack-in-the-pulpit are common. Woodferns, Bracken fern, Horsetails, Christmas ferns, hay-scented fern, Cinnamon fern and Royal Ferns are found throughout the park.

== Climate ==
The Boston Mill Visitor Center at Cuyahoga Valley National Park has a hot-summer humid continental climate (Köppen climate classification Dfa). The plant hardiness zone at Boston Store Visitor Center is 6a with an average annual extreme minimum air temperature of −6.5 °F (−21.4 °C).

Climate data for Boston Mill Visitor Center, elevation 722 ft (220 m), 1981–2010 normals, extremes 1981–2019
Month	Jan	Feb	Mar	Apr	May	Jun	Jul	Aug	Sep	Oct	Nov	Dec	Year
Record high °F (°C)	69.3 (20.7)	75.7 (24.3)	82.5 (28.1)	86.8 (30.4)	91.5 (33.1)	101.7 (38.7)	100.8 (38.2)	97.6 (36.4)	93.3 (34.1)	89.6 (32.0)	78.5 (25.8)	75.9 (24.4)	101.7 (38.7)
Mean daily maximum °F (°C)	34.9 (1.6)	38.1 (3.4)	47.1 (8.4)	59.5 (15.3)	70.2 (21.2)	79.6 (26.4)	83.4 (28.6)	81.5 (27.5)	74.8 (23.8)	63.2 (17.3)	51.5 (10.8)	38.9 (3.8)	60.3 (15.7)
Mean daily minimum °F (°C)	20.7 (−6.3)	22.3 (−5.4)	28.9 (−1.7)	39.6 (4.2)	49.1 (9.5)	59.2 (15.1)	63.4 (17.4)	62.0 (16.7)	55.2 (12.9)	44.7 (7.1)	35.9 (2.2)	25.8 (−3.4)	42.3 (5.7)
Record low °F (°C)	−23.3 (−30.7)	−12.2 (−24.6)	−5.7 (−20.9)	14.5 (−9.7)	29.3 (−1.5)	37.4 (3.0)	44.6 (7.0)	41.3 (5.2)	35.7 (2.1)	21.5 (−5.8)	10.6 (−11.9)	−14.9 (−26.1)	−23.3 (−30.7)
Average precipitation inches (mm)	2.43 (62)	2.08 (53)	2.77 (70)	3.35 (85)	3.92 (100)	3.84 (98)	3.94 (100)	3.56 (90)	3.51 (89)	2.88 (73)	3.27 (83)	2.87 (73)	38.42 (976)
Average dew point °F (°C)	20.9 (−6.2)	22.3 (−5.4)	28.2 (−2.1)	37.3 (2.9)	48.0 (8.9)	58.0 (14.4)	62.3 (16.8)	61.8 (16.6)	55.3 (12.9)	43.7 (6.5)	34.5 (1.4)	25.3 (−3.7)	41.6 (5.3)
Source: PRISM

== Attractions ==
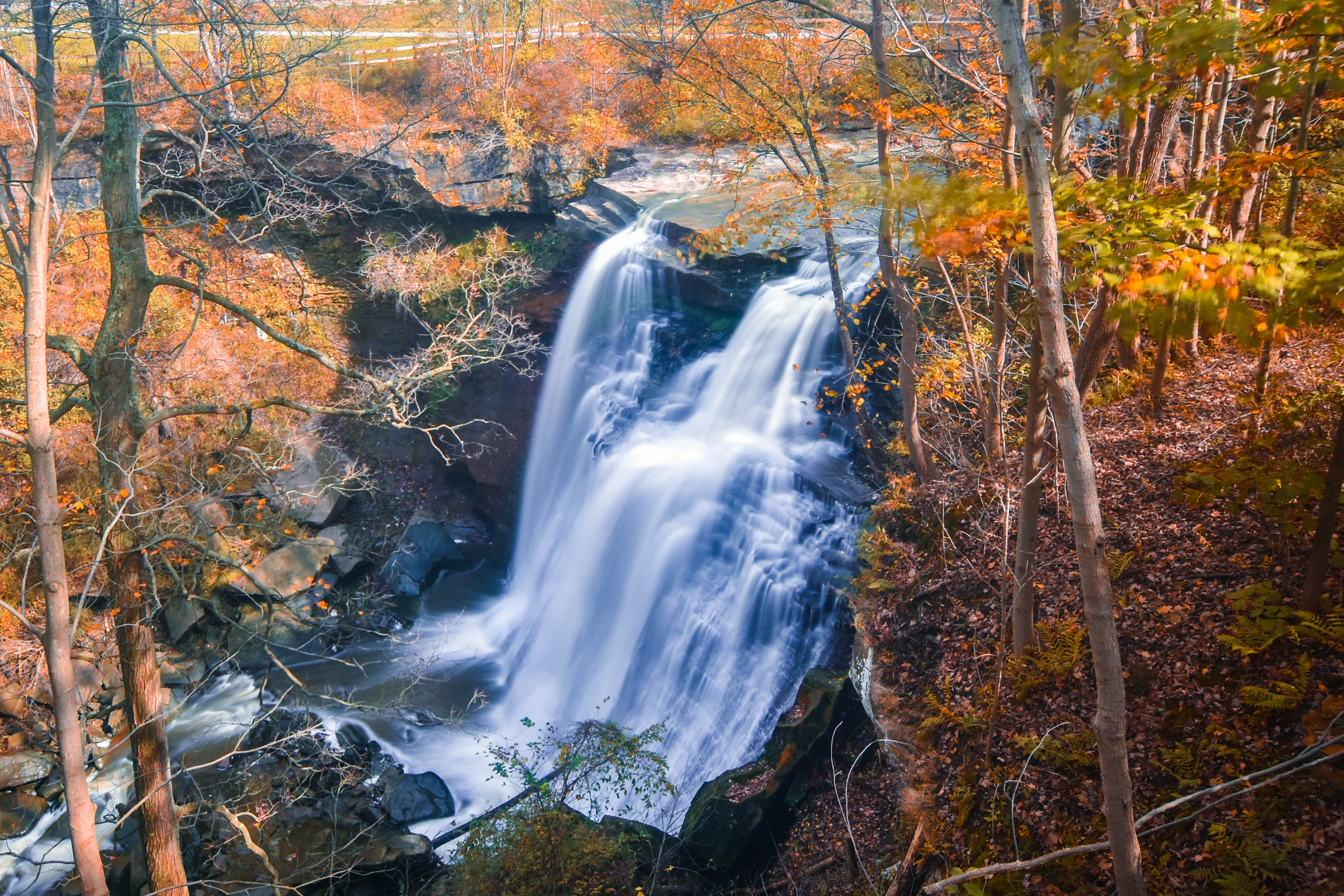
Brandywine Falls

Cuyahoga Valley features natural, man-made, and private attractions, which is unusual for an American national park. The park includes compatible-use sites not owned by the federal government, such as four reservations of the Cleveland Metroparks, as well as four parks and one multipurpose trail of Summit Metro Parks.

The natural areas include forests, rolling hills, narrow ravines, wetlands, rivers, and waterfalls. About 100 waterfalls are located in the Cuyahoga Valley, with the most popular being the 65-foot (20 m) tall Brandywine Falls—the tallest waterfall in the park and the fifth-tallest in Ohio. The Ledges are a rock outcropping that provides a westward view across the valley's wooded areas. Talus caves are located among the boulders in the forest around the Ledges.

The park has several trails, most notably the 20-mile (32 km) Towpath Trail, which follows a former stretch of the 308-mile (496 km) Ohio and Erie Canal and is popular for hiking, bicycling, and running. Skiing and sled-riding are available during the winter at Kendall Hills. Visitors can play golf, or take scenic excursions and railroad tours on the Cuyahoga Valley Scenic Railroad during special events.

The park also features preserved and restored displays of 19th and early 20th century sustainable farming and rural living, most notably the Hale Farm and Village, while catering to contemporary cultural interests with art exhibits, outdoor concerts, and theater performances in venues such as Blossom Music Center and Kent State University's Porthouse Theatre. In the mid-1980s, the park hosted the National Folk Festival.

=== Ohio and Erie Canal Towpath Trail ===
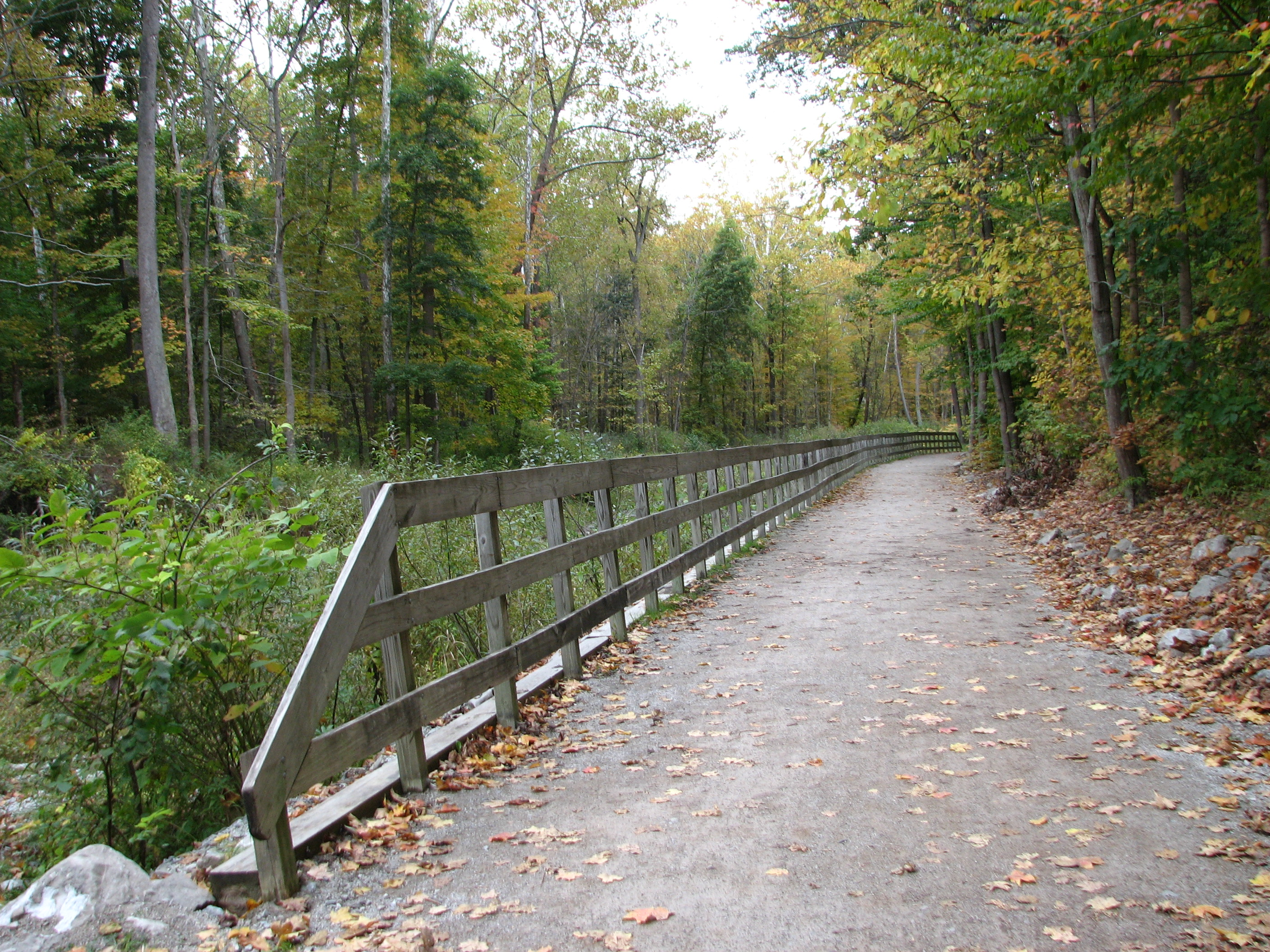
Ohio and Erie Canal Towpath Trail

The multi-purpose Ohio and Erie Canal Towpath Trail was developed by the National Park Service and is the major trail through Cuyahoga Valley National Park. The trail traverses almost 21 mi (34 km) from Rockside Road in Independence in the north to Summit County's Bike & Hike trail in the south, following the Cuyahoga River for much of its length. Outhouse restrooms are available at several trailheads, and food and drink establishments are along Rockside Road, as well as the Boston Store in Peninsula, and at the seasonal farmer's market on Botzum Road. Three visitor centers are located along the path: the Canal Exploration Center, Boston Store, and the Hunt House. The trail connects to a Cleveland Metroparks trail at Rockside Road, which continues another 6 mi (9.7 km) north. The Summit County trail continues through Akron and further south through Stark and Tuscarawas counties to Zoar, Ohio, almost 70 mi (110 km) continuously, with a single 1 mi (1.6 km) interruption. Sections of the towpath trail outside of Cuyahoga Valley National Park are owned and maintained by various state and local agencies. The trail also meets the Buckeye Trail in the national park near Boston Store. Another section of the Summit County Bike & Hike Trail system is nearby, connecting to Brandywine Falls, Cleveland Metroparks' Bedford Reservation and the cities of Solon in Cuyahoga County, Hudson and Stow in Summit County, and Kent and Ravenna in Portage County.

Seasonally, the Cuyahoga Valley Scenic Railroad (CVSR) allows visitors to travel along the towpath from Rockside Road to Akron, embarking or disembarking at any of the stops along the way. The train is especially popular with bicyclists, and for viewing and photographing fall colors. CVSR is independently owned and operated.

==== History ====
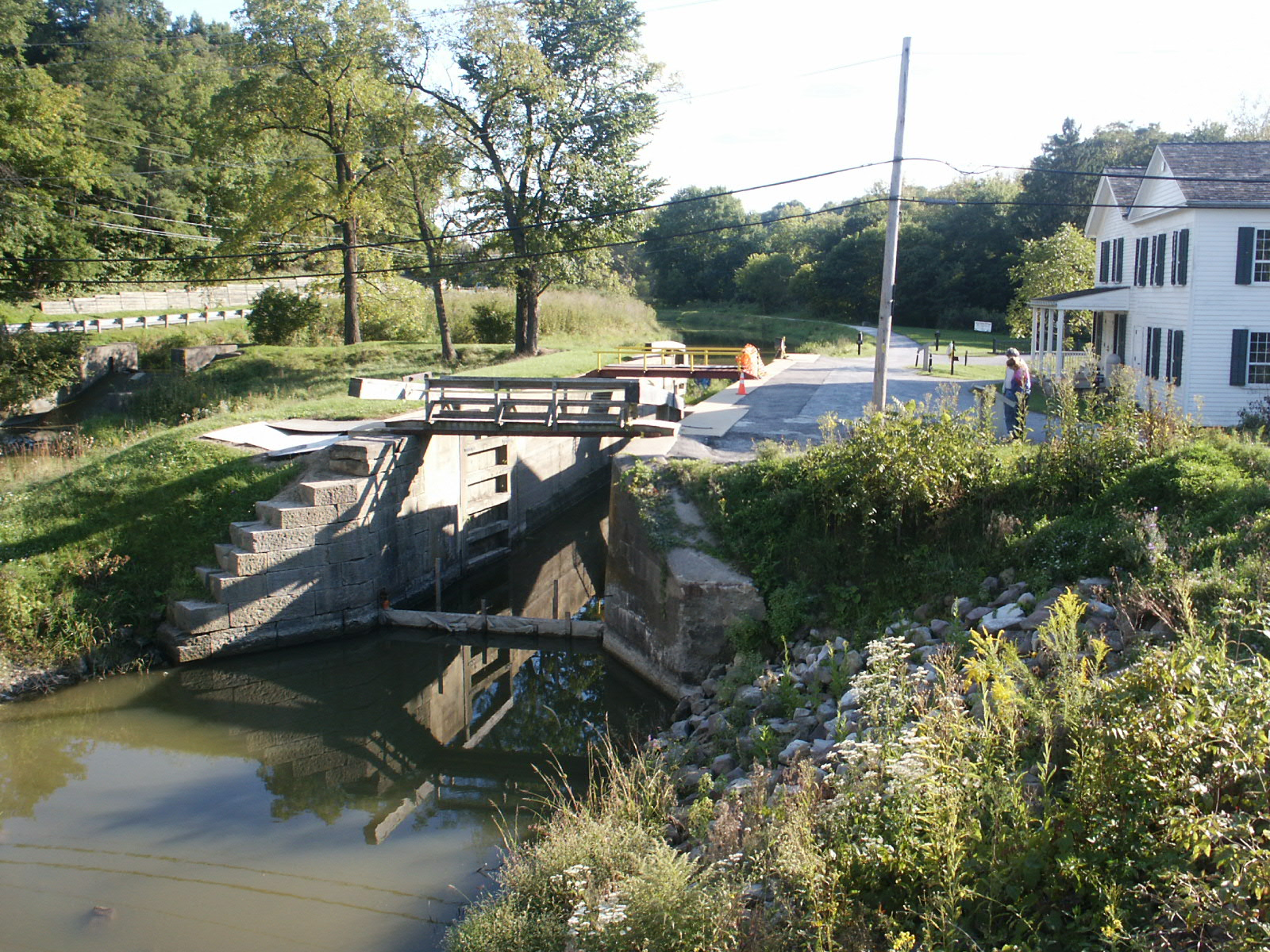
Restored Ohio and Erie Canal Lock at the Canal Exploration Center

The Towpath Trail follows the historic route of the Ohio and Erie Canal. Before the canal was built, Ohio was a sparsely settled wilderness where travel was difficult and getting crops to market was nearly impossible. The canal, built between 1825 and 1832, provided a new transportation route from Cleveland on Lake Erie, to Portsmouth on the Ohio River. The canal connected Ohio to the rest of the eastern United States. Numerous wayside exhibits provide information about canal features and sites of historic interest.

Visitors can walk or ride along the same path that the mules used to tow the canal boats loaded with goods and passengers. The scene is different than it was then; the canal was full of water carrying a steady flow of boats. Evidence of beavers can be seen in many places along the trail.

==== Stanford House (formerly Stanford Hostel) ====
Located in the scenic Cuyahoga Valley near Peninsula, Stanford House is a historic 19th-century farm home built in the 1830s by George Stanford, one of the first settlers in the Western Reserve. In 1978, the NPS purchased the property to serve as a youth hostel in conjunction with the American Youth Hostels (AYH) organization. In March 2011, Stanford Hostel became Stanford House, Cuyahoga Valley National Park's first in-park lodging facility. The home was renovated by the Conservancy for Cuyahoga Valley National Park and the National Park Service, and is only available to parties willing to rent the entire house. There are no other lodging facilities within the park, and camping and overnight parking are prohibited in the park.

==== Towpath trailheads ====
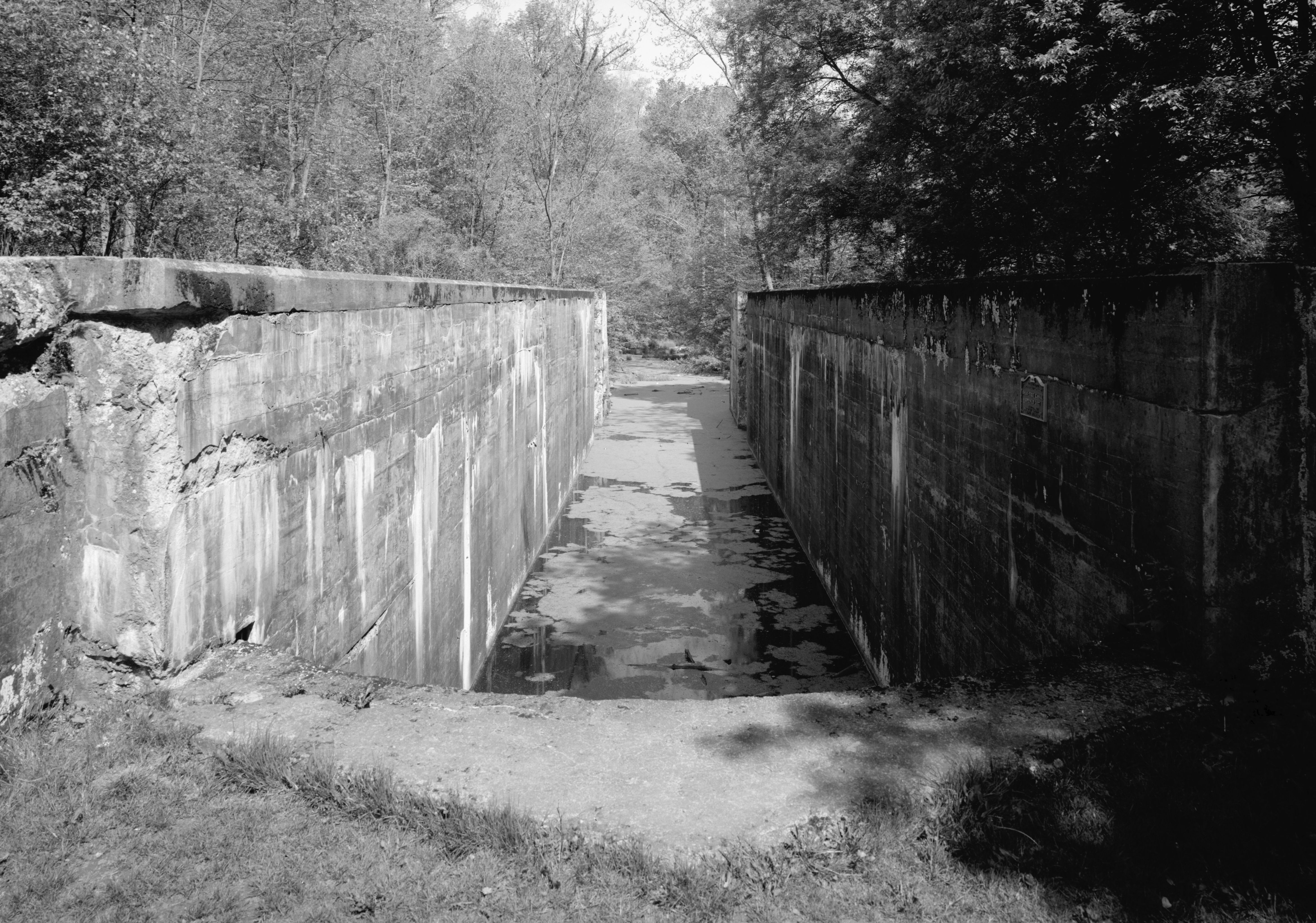
Lock 28 of the Ohio and Erie Canal, near Peninsula, Ohio

Within the national park, trailhead parking for the towpath trail is available along Canal Road, from north to south, at:

- Lock 39—west of intersection with Rockside Road; 41.39309°N 81.628565°W
- Canal Exploration Center—at Hillside Road; 41°22′21″N 81°36′47″W
- Frazee House—south of Alexander Road, north of Sagamore Road; 41.352443°N 81.592377°W

and along Riverview Road, from north to south, at:

- Station Road Bridge—east along with Chippewa Creek Drive; 41.318618°N 81.587957°W
- Red Lock—east of the river, along Vaughn/Highland Road; 41.289148°N 81.563379°W
- Boston Store—east on Boston Mills Road; 41.263205°N 81.559408°W
- Peninsula Depot—east across river on Route 303, then N Locust Street, and W Mill Street to parking lot; 41.243331°N 81.549186°W
- Lock 28—also called Deep Lock; south of Major Road; 41.229917°N 81.554756°W
- Hunt House—at Bolanz Road; 41.200288°N 81.57201°W
- Ira Road—just north of intersection; 41.184467°N 81.583038°W
- Botzum station—south of Bath Road; 41.158453°N 81.573788°W.

== Geology ==
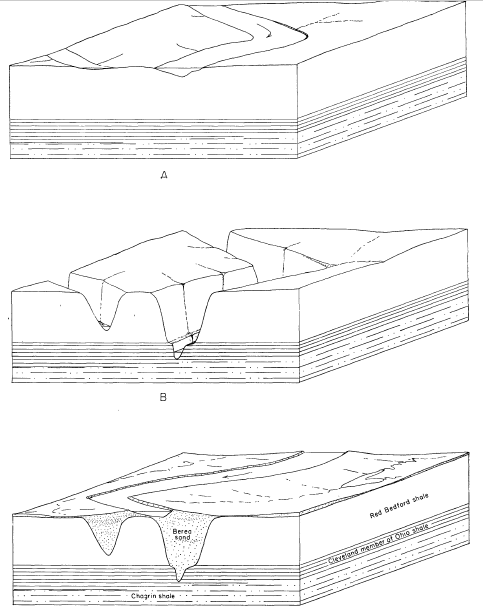
Deposition of the Berea Sandstone within the Bedford Shale during the Lower Mississippian

The "V" course of the Cuyahoga River is rather unusual, first flowing southwest, and then abruptly turning north to drain into Lake Erie not far from its origin. The left arm of this "V", flowing north through the park, corresponds to an older preglacial valley, while the right arm corresponds to relatively new drainage. The new segment cut into the old at Cuyahoga Falls, the base of the "V". Other streams have made routes into the Cuyahoga preglacial valley by cutting gorges with waterfalls such as those found along the Tinkers, Brandywine and Chippewa Creeks. These waterfalls form as flowing water erodes the Bedford Shale, which underlies the more resistant Berea Sandstone. Glacial drift fills the valley to a depth of 400 feet (120 m). This fill is very complex due to ponding in front of the ice before and after each glaciation. Beach deposits, gravel bars and other shoreline deposits from Lake Maumee are found in the valley, as are gravels from the time of Lake Arkona, and ridges marking the shores of Lake Whittlesey, Lake Warren, and Lake Wayne.

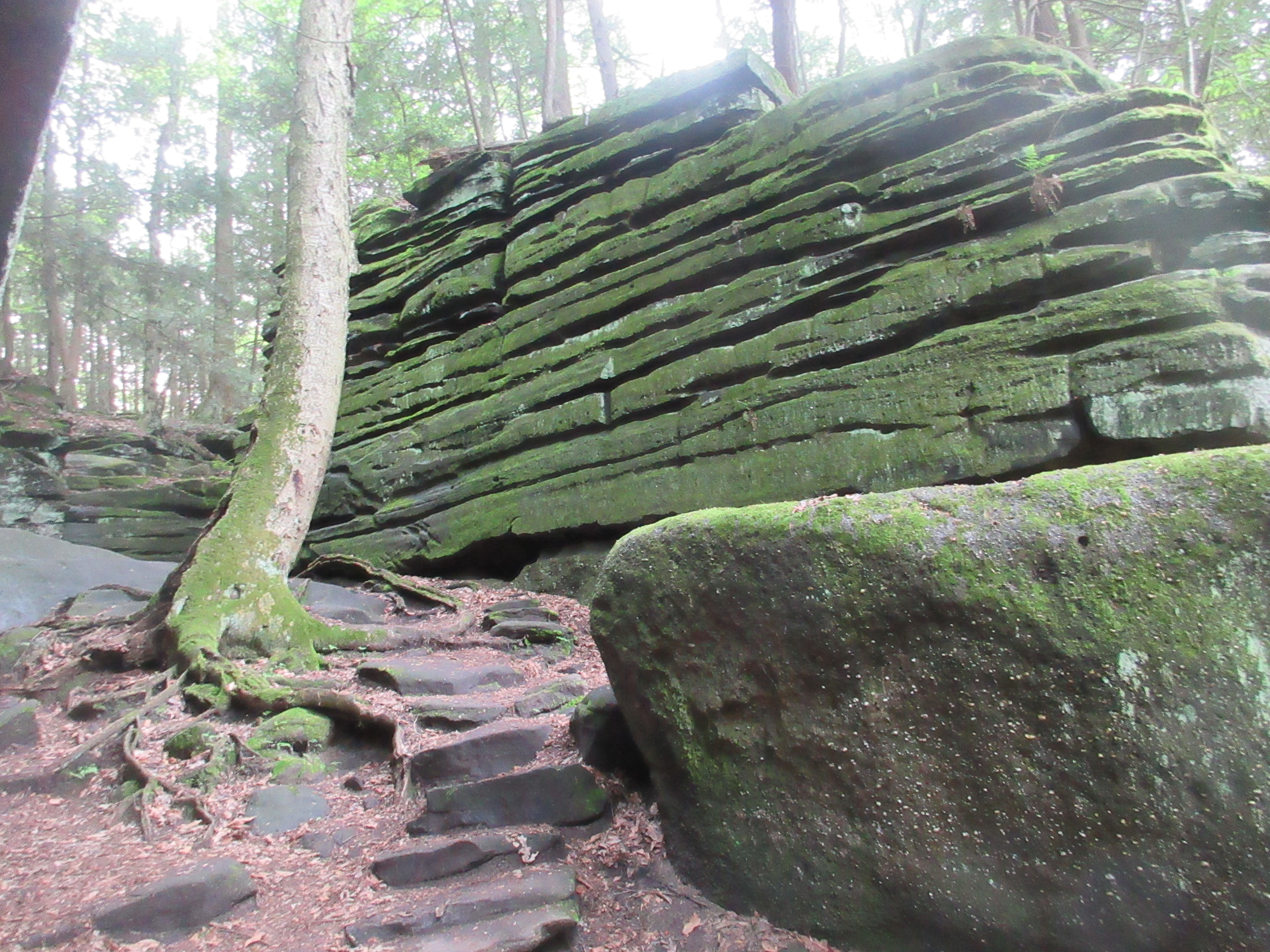
The Ledges section of the park, which contains some of its most popular hiking trails, features a series impressive rock outcroppings formed from Sharon Conglomerate stone.

A noticeable remnant of the Wisconsin glaciation is the Defiance moraine, which trends from Defiance in western Ohio, across the state into Pennsylvania. As Cushing et al. point out, "The Defiance moraine represents the last notable stand of the glacial front in this region." The moraine varies in width from 2–4 mi (3.2–6.4 km), and according to Leverett, "it is like a broad wave whose crest stands 20 to 50 feet above the border of the plain outside it." This moraine forms a lobe that protrudes south into the valley for 8 mi (13 km) all the way to Peninsula, the lobe being 6 mi (9.7 km) wide at the north end, tapering to 3 mi (4.8 km) wide at the south end. Kames and eskers mark the terrain south of this moraine up to the southern extent of the glaciation.

The Berea Sandstone and the Bedford Shale were deposited in a river delta environment in the Lower Mississippian. River channels were incised into the Bedford Shale and subsequently these channels were filled by the Berea Sandstone. Besides setting the stage for majestic gorges and waterfalls within the valley, they have provided an economic use as well. The Berea Sandstone was quarried in Berea for grindstones and building stones, while the lowermost part of the Bedford Shale was quarried in South Euclid and Cleveland Heights for its bluestone.

The Sharon Conglomerate is a Lower Pennsylvanian formation composed of sandstone and conglomerate which forms, according to Cushing et al., "disconnected patches or outliers that cap the highest hills... these outliers stand boldly above the surrounding country" due to its resistance to erosion. The Boston Ledges are the most noteworthy example. As the Mississippian shale underneath is washed away, huge blocks of the Sharon result from the settling. As Cushing et al. explain, "frost action aids in pushing these blocks apart, cracks are widened into caves, and a tangle of blocks results, separated by passages of uneven widths."

Shale gas has been produced in the area since 1883, when H.A. Mastick's well was drilled in the Rockport Township to a depth of 527 ft (161 m), yielding 21,643 cubic feet (612.9 m^{3}) of gas daily. A gas boom occurred in 1914–1915, and by 1931, several hundred gas wells were producing from the Devonian Huron shale. Production came from shales 1,250 ft (380 m) thick at depths from 400–1,840 ft (120–560 m). Pressures were 3–135 psi (21–931 kPa) flowing less than 20,000 cubic feet (570 m^{3}) of gas daily, but was sufficient to furnish light for a house or two, and sometimes heat. As Cushing et al. pointed out in the 1930s, "there are vast amounts of petroleum in the Devonian shales." Since then, the Marcellus Shale and the deeper Utica Shale have shown their economic potential.

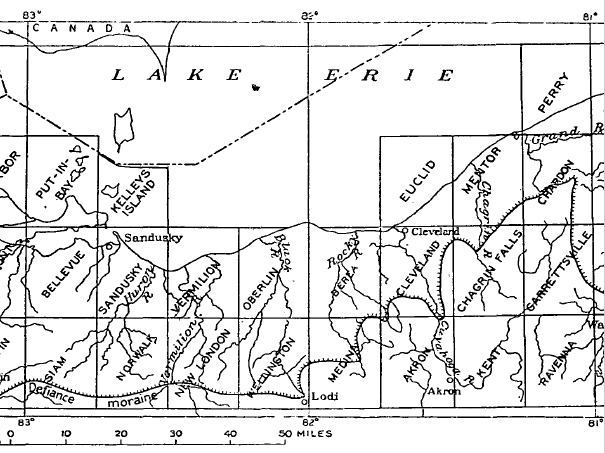
Map tracing the extent of the Defiance Moraine

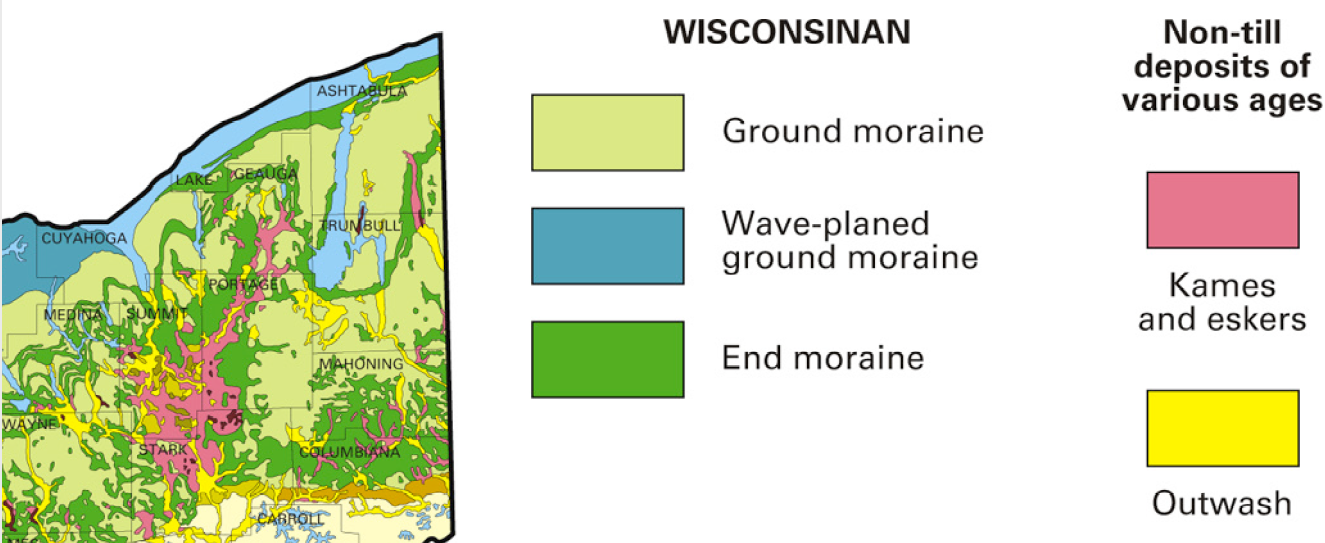
Geological map of surface glacial features

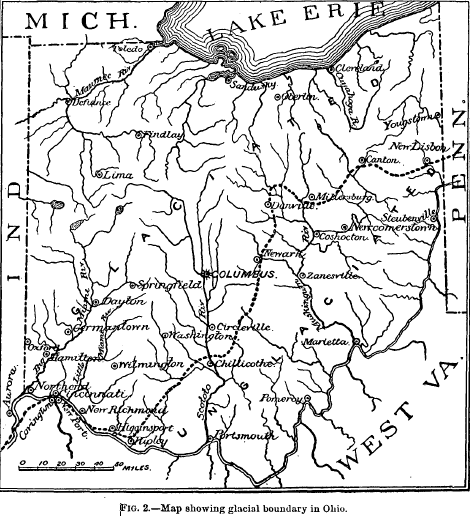
Ohio glacial boundary

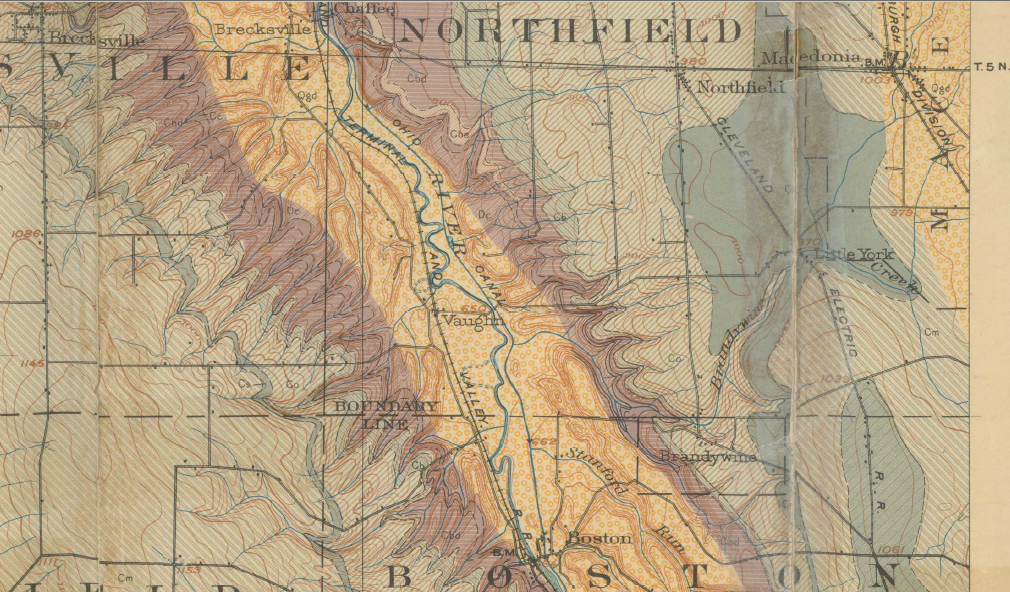
Geological map of rock outcrops

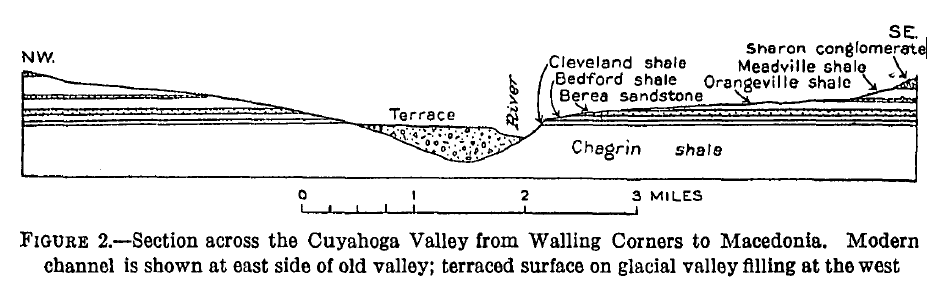
Geologic cross section

== Visitor centers ==
The Canal Exploration Center is located along Canal Road at Hillside Road in Valley View, south of Rockside Road. The visitor center contains interactive maps and games related to the history of the canal, especially the years from 1825 to 1876. The canal-era building once served canal boat passengers waiting to pass through the Ohio and Erie Canal's Lock 38.

Boston Store was constructed in 1836 and is located just east of Riverview Road. The building was used as a warehouse, store, post office, and a general gathering place. The visitor center has a museum featuring exhibits on canal boat-building. A short video is available, as well as maps, brochures and NPS passport stamps.

The Hunt House at Riverview and Bolanz Roads is typical of late-19th-century family farms in the Cuyahoga Valley. Visitors can obtain information about park activities and see exhibits about the area's agricultural history. The farm is an ideal starting point for a hike or a bicycle ride as it is adjacent to the canal towpath trail.

The Frazee House on Canal Road in Valley View south of Rockside Road was constructed from 1825 to 1826, during the same years the northern section of the canal was dug. The house is a fine example of a Western Reserve home and features exhibits relating to architectural styles, construction techniques, and the Frazee family.

== Points of historic interest ==
Site	Image	Description
Canal Exploration Center		Exhibits related to the Ohio and Erie Canal history are available at the Canal Exploration Center. The exhibits are housed in a renovated canal-era tavern that had such a colorful reputation that it was called "Hell's Half Acre". Lock 38 is located in the front.
Ohio and Erie Canal related structures		The Ohio and Erie Canal was constructed between 1825 and 1832, providing Ohio with a transportation system that permitted residents to conduct trade with the world. While it stopped functioning after the Great Flood of 1913, remnants and ruins of canal-related structures can be seen alongside the Ohio and Erie Canal Towpath Trail. Wayside exhibits explain the function of many of the structures visible from the trail.
Frazee House		The Frazee House was under construction in 1825 when the canal was dug through its front yard. The house was built in the Western Reserve architectural style.
Boston Store (Boston Mill Visitor Center)		This early canal-era building was owned by the Boston Land and Manufacturing Company. The store has numerous canal boat-building exhibits.
Peninsula Depot		The Peninsula Depot of the Cuyahoga Valley Scenic Railroad (CVSR) is located on West Mill Street in the village of Peninsula. The depot was originally in the village of Boston, but was moved to Peninsula in the late 1960s. The building may be the only surviving combination station from the Valley Railway, which operated between Cleveland and Tuscarawas County in the late 19th century. The depot is an operating station for CVSR train rides.
Everett Covered Bridge		The Everett Covered Bridge— one of over 125 in Ohio but the only covered bridge in Summit County—was constructed after a local resident was killed attempting to cross the swollen Furnace Run in 1877. The bridge was destroyed by storm floodwaters in 1975 and reconstructed by the National Park Service in 1986. The bridge is located on Everett Road about 1/2 mile (800 m) west of Riverview Road near Everett Village.
Brandywine Village		Brandywine Village was conceived and founded by George Wallace, who built a sawmill next to Brandywine Falls in 1814. He encouraged others to move to the area, including his brother-in-law, who built a grist mill on the opposite side of the falls. With inexpensive land available and the presence of mills to provide lumber, flour, and corn meal, Brandywine Village began to grow. A couple of buildings remain from the village, and historic photos and remnants of building foundations can also be seen.
Civilian Conservation Corps structures		The Civilian Conservation Corps was responsible for the construction of several structures in the valley. Happy Days Lodge and the shelters at the Ledges, Octagon, and Kendall Lake were built of American chestnut in the late 1930s. All four structures are in the Virginia Kendall Unit of the park.
Stanford House		James Stanford moved to Boston Township immediately after surveying and naming it in 1806. He and his wife Polly and son George were the first homesteaders in what is today Cuyahoga Valley National Park. His son George built the stately Greek revival home in about 1830. The house accommodates meetings and retreats as a day-use facility, and tourists as a moderately priced overnight facility with nine bedrooms. The house had previously served as a youth hostel.
Hale Farm and Village		Hale Farm and Village is an outdoor living history museum. Costumed interpreters describe life in the Western Reserve. The village features 21 historic buildings and many talented craftspeople. The site is operated by the Western Reserve Historical Society. Craft demonstrations include glassblowing, candlemaking, broommaking, spinning and weaving, cheesemaking, blacksmithing, woodworking, sawmilling, hearth cooking, and pottery making. The farm also has oxen, sheep, cows, and gardens.

=== National Register of Historic Places ===
All properties listed here are open to the public, though some in a limited way—see Status column. Many of the NRHP sites found in the full list are in private ownership and are not listed here.

Cuyahoga Valley National Park - National Register of Historic Places
District or site	County	Locale	Status	Address	Register date
Valley Railway Historic District	Both	Independence to Akron	Cuyahoga Valley Scenic Railroad scenic train rides	Cuyahoga Valley between Rockside Road and Howard Street at Little Cuyahoga Valley	1985/05/17
Cleveland and Pittsburgh Railroad Bridge	Cuyahoga	Bedford		Tinkers Creek	1975/07/24
Brecksville-Northfield High Level Bridge (state highway bridge)	Cuyahoga	Brecksville—41°19′17″N 081°35′14″W		Ohio State Route 82 and Cuyahoga River (also in Northfield, Summit County, Ohio); best viewed from Station Road Bridge Trailhead on the Towpath Trail (Riverview Road just south of Ohio State Route 82)	1986/01/06
Brecksville Trailside Museum (Cleveland Metroparks Nature Center)	Cuyahoga	Brecksville		Chippewa Creek Drive off Ohio State Route 82	1992
Stephen Frazee House	Cuyahoga	Valley View	CVNP visitor center with limited open hours	7733 Canal Road	1976/05/04
Lock 37 and Spillway	Cuyahoga	Valley View	Formerly part of Ohio and Erie Canal, currently on the Towpath Trail	Fitzwater Road	1979/12/11
Lock 38 and Spillway	Cuyahoga	Valley View	Formerly part of Ohio and Erie Canal, currently on the Towpath Trail	Hillside Road	1979/12/11
Lock 39 and Spillway	Cuyahoga	Valley View	Formerly part of Ohio and Erie Canal, currently on the Towpath Trail	Canal Road	1979/12/11
Inn at Lock 38	Cuyahoga	Valley View—41.372624°N 81.613035°W	CVNP Canal Exploration Center	7104 Canal Road, Ohio and Erie Canal Towpath Trail	1979/12/11
Tinkers Creek Aqueduct	Cuyahoga	Valley View—41°21′53″N 081°36′32″W	Formerly part of Ohio and Erie Canal, currently on the Towpath Trail	Tinkers Creek	1979/12/11
Wilson Feed Mill	Cuyahoga	Valley View	feed and grain store	7604 Canal Road, Ohio and Erie Canal Towpath Trail	1979/12/17
Ohio and Erie Canal	Cuyahoga	Valley View	National Historic Landmark, 1966/11/13	Ohio State Route 631	1965/11/13
Hale, Jonathan Homestead - Hale Farm and Village	Summit	Bath		2686 Oak Hill Road	1973/04/23
Boston Land and Manufacturing Company Store (a.k.a. Boston Store)	Summit	Boston	CVNP visitor center with limited open hours	Ohio and Erie Canal Towpath Trail, Boston Mills Road	1979/12/11
Lock 32	Summit	Boston	Formerly part of Ohio and Erie Canal, currently on the Towpath Trail	800 ft (240 m) north of Boston Mills Road	1979/12/11
Boston Mills Historic District	Summit	Boston	most buildings are private	Boston Mills Road, Stanford Road & Main Street	1992/11/09
Lock 33	Summit	Boston vicinity	Formerly part of Ohio and Erie Canal, currently on the Towpath Trail	1 mi (1.6 km) south of Highland Road	1979/12/11
Hunt House	Summit	Cuyahoga Falls	limited open hours	2049 Bolanz Road	1993/03/12
Station Road Bridge	Summit	Brecksville vicinity—41.318618°N 81.58795741°W		East of Brecksville at Cuyahoga River	1979/03/07
Lock 27	Summit	Everett	Formerly part of Ohio and Erie Canal, currently on the Towpath Trail	Approx. 400 ft (120 m) east of intersection of Riverview and Everett Roads	1993/03/12
Furnace Run Aqueduct	Summit	Everett vicinity	Formerly part of Ohio and Erie Canal, currently on the Towpath Trail	Furnace Run	1979/12/11
Everett Historic District	Summit	Everett	village is open to the public; some buildings are private residences; NPS buildings have no visitor facilities	Everett and Riverview Roads	1994/01/14
Everett Knoll Complex	Summit	Everett	Hopewell site dating to ~200 AD	South of Everett Road	1977/05/11
Lock 26	Summit	Ira	Formerly part of Ohio and Erie Canal, currently on the Towpath Trail	3.3 mi (5.3 km) north of Ira Road	1979/12/11
Wallace Farm	Summit	Northfield vicinity	open to patrons of the bed & breakfast only (Inn at Brandywine Falls)	8230 Brandywine Road	1985/06/27
Everett Covered Bridge	Summit	Peninsula	destroyed by floodwaters in 1975; reconstructed in 1986	SW of Peninsula on Everett Road over Furnace Creek	1973/05/23
Lock 28	Summit	Peninsula	Formerly part of Ohio and Erie Canal, currently on the Towpath Trail	Deep Lock Quarry Metro Park	1979/12/11
Lock 29 and Aqueduct	Summit	Peninsula	Formerly part of Ohio and Erie Canal, currently on the Towpath Trail	off Ohio State Route 303	1979/12/11
Lock 30 and Feeder Dam	Summit	Peninsula	Formerly part of Ohio and Erie Canal, currently on the Towpath Trail	off Ohio State Route 303	1979/12/11
Lock 31	Summit	Peninsula	Formerly part of Ohio and Erie Canal, currently on the Towpath Trail	200 ft (61 m) east of Cuyahoga River and approx. 0.5 mi (800 m) south of Ohio Turnpike	1979/12/11
Peninsula Village Historic District	Summit	Peninsula—41°14′32″N 81°32′57″W	most buildings are private; some are retail stores	Both sides of Ohio State Route 303	1974/08/23
George Stanford Farm	Summit	Peninsula vicinity	hosts meetings and retreats as a day-use facility; overnight accommodations	6093 Stanford Road	1982/02/17
Stumpy Basin	Summit	Peninsula vicinity	Formerly part of Ohio and Erie Canal, currently on the Towpath Trail	200 ft (61 m) east of Cuyahoga River and approx, 0.5 mi (800 m) south of Ohio Turnpike	1979/12/11
Virginia Kendall Historic District	Summit	Peninsula vicinity	shelter, restrooms, winter sports center	Truxell Road	1997/01/10
Lock 34	Summit	Sagamore Hills	Formerly part of Ohio and Erie Canal, currently on the Towpath Trail	Highland Road	1979/12/17
Lock 35	Summit	Sagamore Hills	Formerly part of Ohio and Erie Canal, currently on the Towpath Trail	Off Ohio State Route 82	1979/12/11

== See also ==
- List of birds of Cuyahoga Valley National Park
- List of national parks of the United States
