= Stephen Frazee House =

Historic place in Ohio, United States

- U.S. National Register of Historic Places
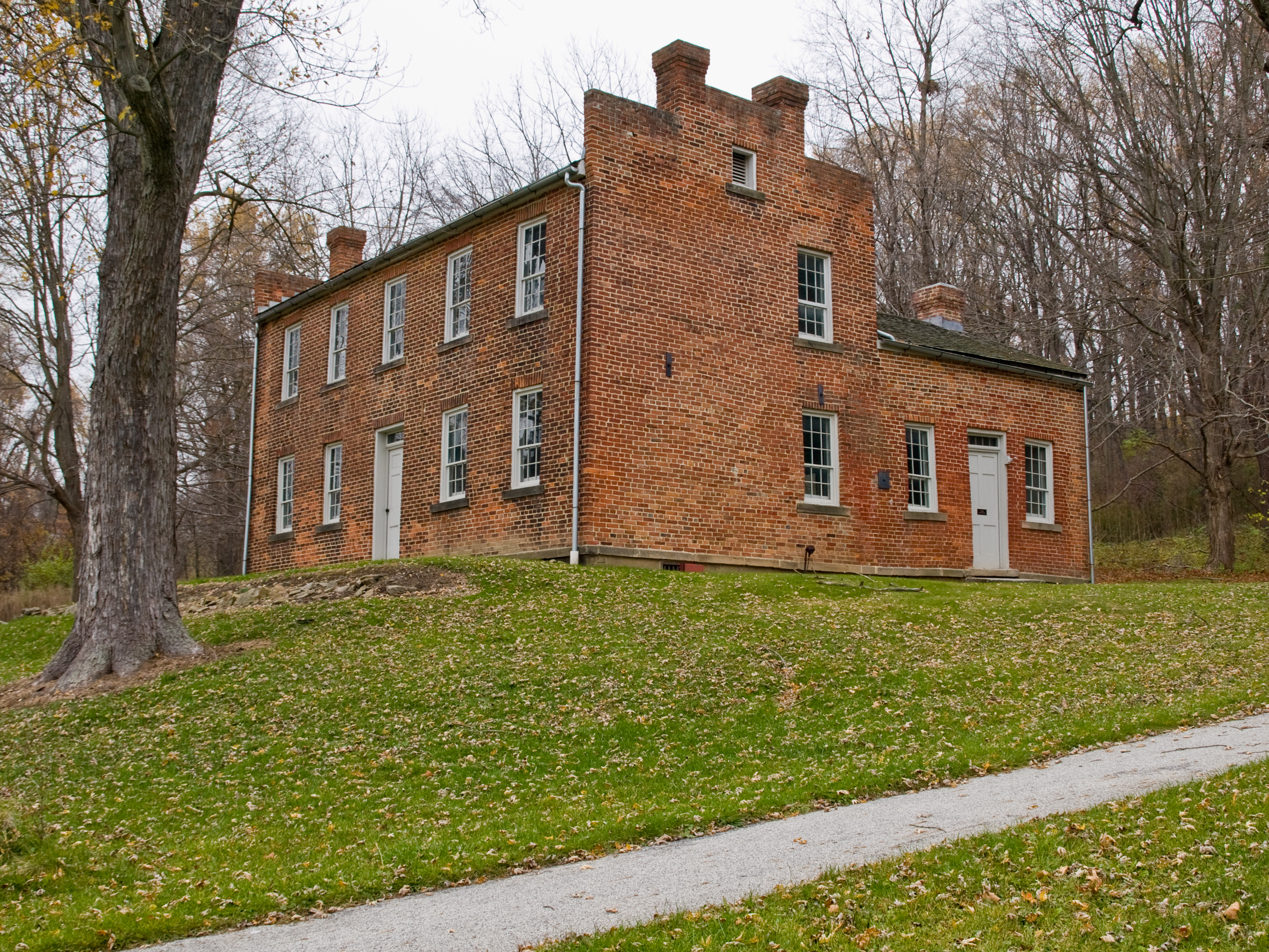

- Location within Ohio
- Location: 7733 Canal Rd., Valley View, Ohio
- Coordinates: 41°21′10″N 81°35′34″W
- Area: less than one acre
- Built: 1826
- Architectural style: Federal
- NRHP reference No.: 76000211
- Added to NRHP: May 4, 1976

The Stephen Frazee House is a historic house at 7733 Canal Road in Cuyahoga Valley National Park in the U.S. state of Ohio. The house was built in 1826 for Stephen and Mehitable Frazee, who had settled in the Cuyahoga Valley a decade earlier. The family had relocated from Poland, Ohio and were among the valley's first settlers; they lived in a log cabin until building the 1826 house. The construction of the Ohio and Erie Canal in the 1820s split Frazee's land in half, and he won $130 from the state in compensation that he may have put toward the house. The house is a Federal style vernacular building; while the style was common in the northeastern U.S., where it was often implemented by professional architects, it was rare in Ohio. The house's bricks were made of clay from the property itself, and the crude bricks and less experienced builders resulted in the house settling during its construction, giving it a permanent warped appearance. The Frazee family lived in the house until 1861, when it was purchased by John Hynton.

The house was added to the National Register of Historic Places on May 4, 1976.
