= Krejci Dump =

Dump in Ohio, USA

- Superfund site
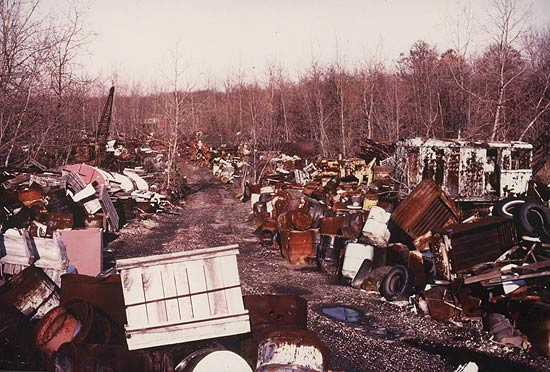
- Krejci Dump in 1981

- Location within Ohio
- Location: Boston Heights, Summit, Ohio; 41.267222°N 81.539722°W

Information
- CERCLIS ID: OHD981785074; DERR Project ID: 277000449004
- Contaminants: Polychlorinated biphenyls; Polyaromatic hydrocarbons; Arsenic; Dioxins and dioxin-like compounds; Heavy metals; Carcinogens
- Responsible parties: Ford Motor Co; General Motors; Federal Metal Co; Minnesota Mining and Manufacturing; Chrysler; Kewanee Industries; Waste Management of Ohio

Progress
- Proposed: Not on the NPL; No Further Remedial Action Planned (NFRAP)

The Krejci Dump was a privately owned dump occupying 47 acres (19 ha) on several sites along Hines Hill Road near Boston Heights, Summit County, Ohio. After the area was converted into part of the then-Cuyahoga Valley National Recreation Area (now the Cuyahoga Valley National Park), the National Park Service discovered that the property, part of one of the most-heavily used parks in the country, was also one of the most contaminated sites in the United States Environmental Protection Agency's Region V. The dump subsequently became a Superfund cleanup site.

== History ==
The Krejci family owned a parcel exceeding 234 acres (95 ha) and opened a junkyard for burning trash and dumping scrap metal in 1940. At some point, the dump began accepting industrial and municipal waste, much of it toxic. This activity continued until 1980, when it closed, but the salvage business operated until 1985. The property was bisected by the 1972 construction of Interstate 271, which left 42 acres (17 ha) on the north side, and 192 acres (78 ha) on the south side.

The Cuyahoga Valley National Recreation Area was created in 1974, and the National Park Service acquired the Krejci property in 1985, thinking they had an old junkyard. The Krejcis vacated the property, and the following year, a person collecting bottles on the site became ill. Park rangers would complain of headaches, rashes, and odors. The National Park Service requested a thorough analysis of the site's contents from the Environmental Protection Agency. It was closed to the public in 1986 after toxic chemicals were found at 14 separate locations on 19 acres (7.7 ha) north of I-271 and 28 acres (11 ha) south.

== Toxins ==
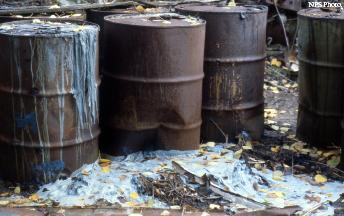
Drums leaching chemicals

Upon investigation and testing of the site between 1986 and 1987, many toxic substances were found at the site, including polychlorinated biphenyls (PCBs), polyaromatic hydrocarbons (PAH), arsenic, dioxin, heavy metals, and other carcinogens. Thousands of leaking drums were found on the property. These drums contained waste from industrial processes, including paint, ink, herbicides, pesticides, solvents, and industrial sludge.

== Companies responsible ==
Ford Motor Co, General Motors, Federal Metal Co, Minnesota Mining and Manufacturing (3M), Chrysler, Kewanee Industries (a subsidiary of Chevron Corporation USA), and Waste Management of Ohio were found to be potentially responsible parties (PRPs) in contributing and transporting toxic waste to the Krejci dump. The PRPs had manufacturing facilities in the general vicinity of the Krejci site; Waste Management of Ohio, who had acquired all of the smaller, local refuse hauling companies, had been held ultimately responsible for transporting the wastes. All of these companies were sued in 1997 by the US government through CERCLA (Superfund) to recoup the cost of the cleanup, and all of the PRPs agreed to settle out of court with the exception of 3M, who went to trial and lost.

== Cost ==
The cost of the entire project to the US government is $50 million. However, money recovered through the CERCLA lawsuits resulted in a $21 million judgment against the PRPs. The cleanup project, at a cost of $29 million, was paid for by Ford Motor Co. with help from General Motors. The lawsuits, combined with Ford and GM covering the cost of the cleanup accounted for the entire cost of the project. In 2001 a National Park Service attorney said that the cleanup was the most expensive in the National Parks system.

== Cleanup ==
Cleanup of the site consisted of removal of the drums themselves, along with the rest of the dump's non-hazardous contents. At one point in the cleanup, thousands of multicolored flags covered the former dump's property, identifying multi-increment sub-sample locations. Since soil had been contaminated by chemicals leaking from drums, dirt had to be removed from depths ranging from 12 inches (30 cm) to 25 feet (7.6 m). In the first 12 months of cleanup alone, 108,000 cubic feet (3,100 m^{3}) of contaminated soil had been trucked out of the site. Most of the non-hazardous soil went to two licensed landfills in Ohio, and the contaminated soil went to a licensed facility outside of Detroit. By August 2012, 371,000 short tons (337,000 t) of contaminated material had been removed from the site.

== Outcome ==
The remediated Krejci site, now an NPS Sentinel Wetland within Cuyahoga Valley National Park. Cleanup of the former industrial waste dump — which accepted PCBs, dioxins, and heavy metals from Ford, GM, and 3M — was completed in December 2002.

Because of the extensive contamination, and its on-going identification as the cleanup proceeded, the NPS made numerous predictions about the end-date for cleanup and remediation of the areas. For example, in July 2011 it was predicted that the Krejci dump site would be in the final stages of revegetation in the spring of 2012. But it wasn't until August 2012 that the NPS declared "comprehensive post-excavation soil sampling effort establishes that remediation goals for the 46-acre former dump site have been met," and, "The final steps necessary to restore the Site may now begin, including final grading; re-vegetation using native meadow grasses, forbs and shrubs; and restoration of 3 acres of wetland and wet meadow habitats." The Ohio Division of Environmental Response and Revitalization (DERR) also had a projected end-date of sometime in 2012.

The ultimate goal of the NPS was to have the site appear as it originally would have, with native plants and wetlands covering the area. "Upon completion of the cleanup, the site will be restored to natural conditions consistent with surrounding Park habitat, and restrictions on public access will be removed."

Remediation work was completed in December 2020.
