= Everett Historic District (Peninsula, Ohio) =

Historic district in Ohio, United States

- U.S. National Register of Historic Places
- U.S. Historic district
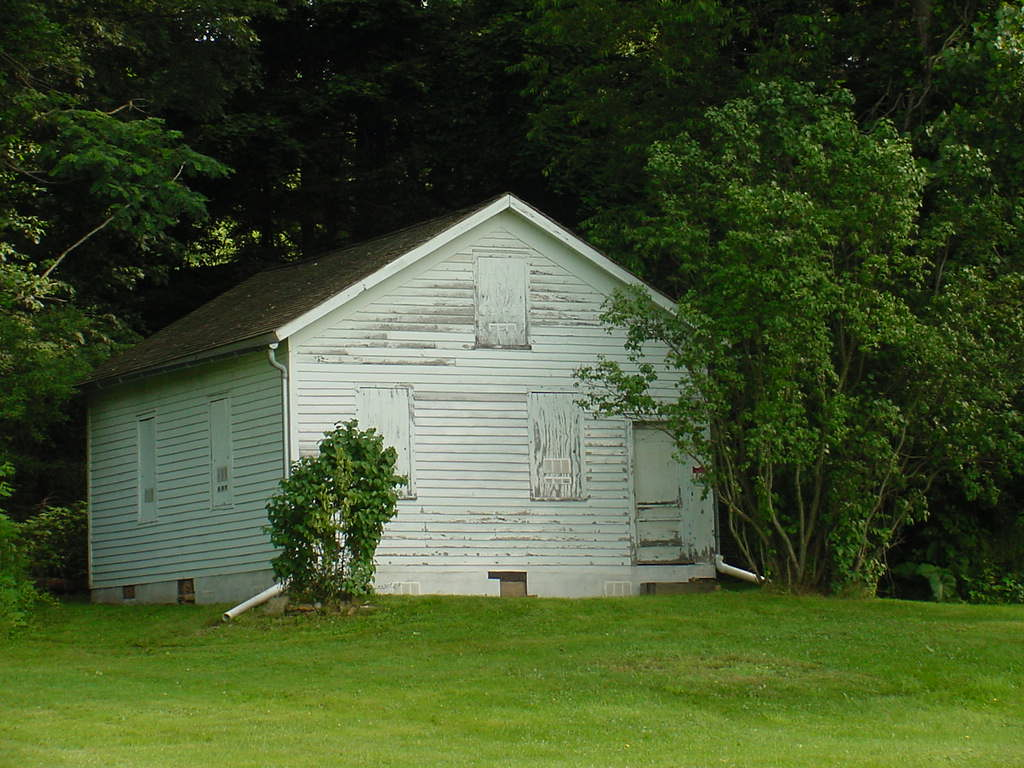

- Location within Ohio Location within the United States
- Nearest city: Peninsula, Ohio
- Coordinates: 41°12′16″N 81°34′29″W
- Area: 17 acres (6.9 ha)
- Architectural style: Late Victorian
- NRHP reference No.: 93001467
- Added to NRHP: January 14, 1993

Everett Historic District is a rural village located within Cuyahoga Valley National Park. It is registered on the National Register of Historic Places. Everett is unique for being uncompromised by the pressures of suburban development. It represents a typical unincorporated hamlet of the turn of the 20th century rural America.

The historic district comprises the village buildings, dating from the 1880s to the 1930s, along with their outbuildings (a varied collection of outhouses, garages, chicken coops, barns, and a milk house. Everett formed due to the existence of Johnny Cake Lock on the Ohio and Erie Canal. The settlement was renamed Unionville, and still later Everett in honor of Sylvester T. Everett, the Valley Railway's vice president and treasurer.

The district overlaps part of the Everett Knoll Complex, an archeological district associated with the prehistoric Hopewell culture. This area was also used by the Civilian Conservation Corp for a nursery that played a key role in the development of the state and metropolitan parks in the area.

== Bibliography ==
- Lane, Samuel A. (1892). Fifty Years and Over of Akron and Summit County. Akron, Ohio: Beacon Job Dept.
- Tamburro, Sam; Galonska, Juliet (2002). "Introduction". Guide Book for the Tourist and Traveler Over the Valley Railway: The Short Line Between Cleveland, Akron, and Canton. Kent, Ohio: Kent State University Press. ISBN 9780873387354.
