= Ohio and Erie Canal Towpath Trail =

Multi-use trail in Northeast Ohio

Ohio & Erie Canal Towpath Trail
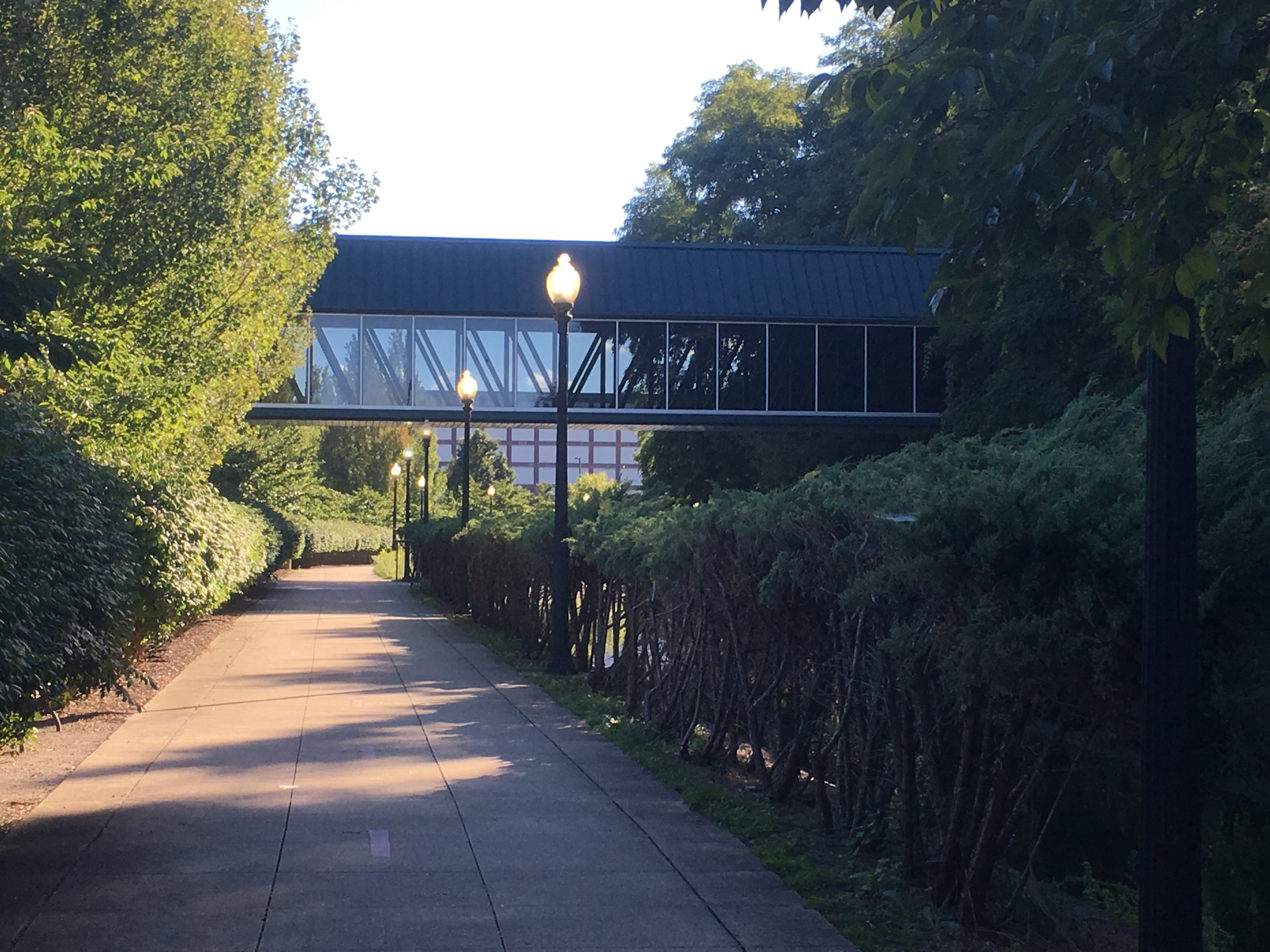
- Length: 93 mi. (101 mi. when completed)
- Location: Northeast Ohio, United States comprising Cuyahoga, Summit, Stark, and Tuscarawas counties.
- Established: 1993
- Designation: USBR 21 / State Bike Route 1
- Trailheads: Cleveland to Zoar (numerous)
- Use: Biking, Hiking, Horseback Riding, Jogging, Running
- Season: Year-round
- Sights: Ohio & Erie Canal
- Surface: Asphalt, Cement, Concrete, Crushed Limestone, Hard–Packed Earth
- Website: www.ohioanderiecanalway.com/explore/the-towpath-trail

The Ohio and Erie Canal Towpath Trail is a multi-use trail that follows part of the former route of the Ohio & Erie Canal in Northeast Ohio.

The trail runs from north to south through Cuyahoga, Summit, Stark, and Tuscarawas counties. The trail is planned to be 101 miles (163 km) long and currently 93 miles (150 km) of the trail are complete. When completed, it will run from Cleveland in the north to New Philadelphia in the south. The Ohio to Erie Trail follows a portion of the towpath trail in Northeast Ohio. The Great American Rail-Trail will follow another portion of the trail, from Clinton southward.

The towpath trail has been developed by a number of organizations. It is currently managed by Cleveland Metroparks, Cuyahoga Valley National Park, Summit Metro Parks, Stark Parks, and the Tuscarawas County Park Department.

In 2003, The Stark County Park District voted to rename the 25 miles (40 km) of the trail within Stark County the "Congressman Ralph Regula Towpath Trail". Regula was honored for his support in Congress for the Ohio & Erie National Heritage Canalway.

The trail has multiple surface types including asphalt, cement, concrete, crushed limestone and hard-packed earth.

== Location ==
The trail currently consists of four segments of trails connected by short portions of roadway. The segments are, from north to south:

- Steelyards Common segment
  - North terminus at W 14th St. and Quigley Rd. in Cleveland: 41°27′59.0″N 81°41′27.0″W
  - South terminus on Jennings Rd. in Cleveland: 41°27′11.2″N 81°41′15.6″W
- Cleveland to Massillon segment
  - North terminus on Harvard Road in Cleveland: 41°26′49.1″N 81°40′57.0″W
  - South terminus on SR 172 in Massillon: 40°47′43.5″N 81°31′36.2″W
- Massillon to Bolivar segment
  - North terminus at Walnut Rd. and SR 21 in Massillon: 40°47′16.5″N 81°31′20.1″W
  - South terminus on SR 212 west of Bolivar: 40°39′15.4″N 81°28′07.9″W
- Bolivar to Zoar segment
  - North terminus at Fort Laurens State Memorial south of Bolivar: 40°38′13.7″N 81°27′22.2″W
  - Intersection with Zoar Valley Trail southeast of Zoar: 40°36′30.6″N 81°25′42.4″W
  - South terminus at Canal Lands Park on Dover-Zoar Rd. in Zoar: 40°36′38.1″N 81°25′29.5″W
- Zoar to Zoarville segment
  - North terminus at Canal Lands Park in Dover-Zoar Rd. in Zoar: 40°36′38.1″N 81°25′29.5″W
  - South terminus at Zoarville Station Bridge: 40°34′38.59″N 81°23′29.02″W

== Events ==
- Annual Towpath Marathon, Half-Marathon, and Ten-Ten Races.
- Annual Towpath Trail Century Ride
- Canal Corridor 100 Mile Endurance Run

== See also ==
- Cleveland Metroparks
- Cuyahoga Valley National Park
- Ohio & Erie Canalway National Heritage Area
- Summit Metro Parks
