= George Stanford Farm =

- U.S. National Register of Historic Places
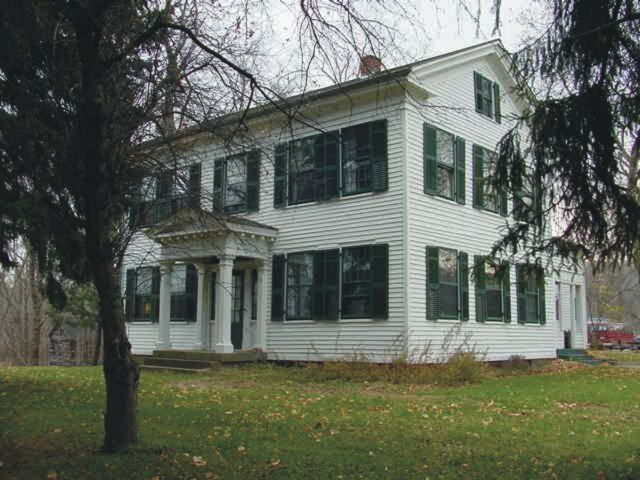

- Location within Ohio
- Location: 6093 Stanford Rd., Boston Township, Ohio
- Coordinates: 41°16′16″N 81°33′25″W
- Area: 3 acres (1.2 ha)
- Built: c. 1830
- Architectural style: Greek Revival
- NRHP reference No.: 82001874
- Added to NRHP: February 17, 1982

The George Stanford Farm is a historic farm at 6093 Stanford Road in Boston Township, Ohio, within the boundaries of Cuyahoga Valley National Park. The farm, which overlooks the Cuyahoga River and Ohio and Erie Canal, was settled in 1806 by James and Polly Stanford and their children. Their son George built the main farmhouse circa 1830. The Stanford family played an important role in the history of Boston Township; James reportedly suggested its name, and both George and his son George C. held government offices in the township. The farmhouse has a Greek Revival design with a pedimented front porch supported by Greek columns, pilasters flanking the entrance, six-over-six windows, and a gable roof with a box cornice. The property also includes a barn, a springhouse, a garage, a smoke house, a chicken coop, and a corn crib.

The farm was added to the National Register of Historic Places on February 17, 1982.
