= Everett Knoll Complex =

Archaeological site in Ohio, United States

- U.S. National Register of Historic Places
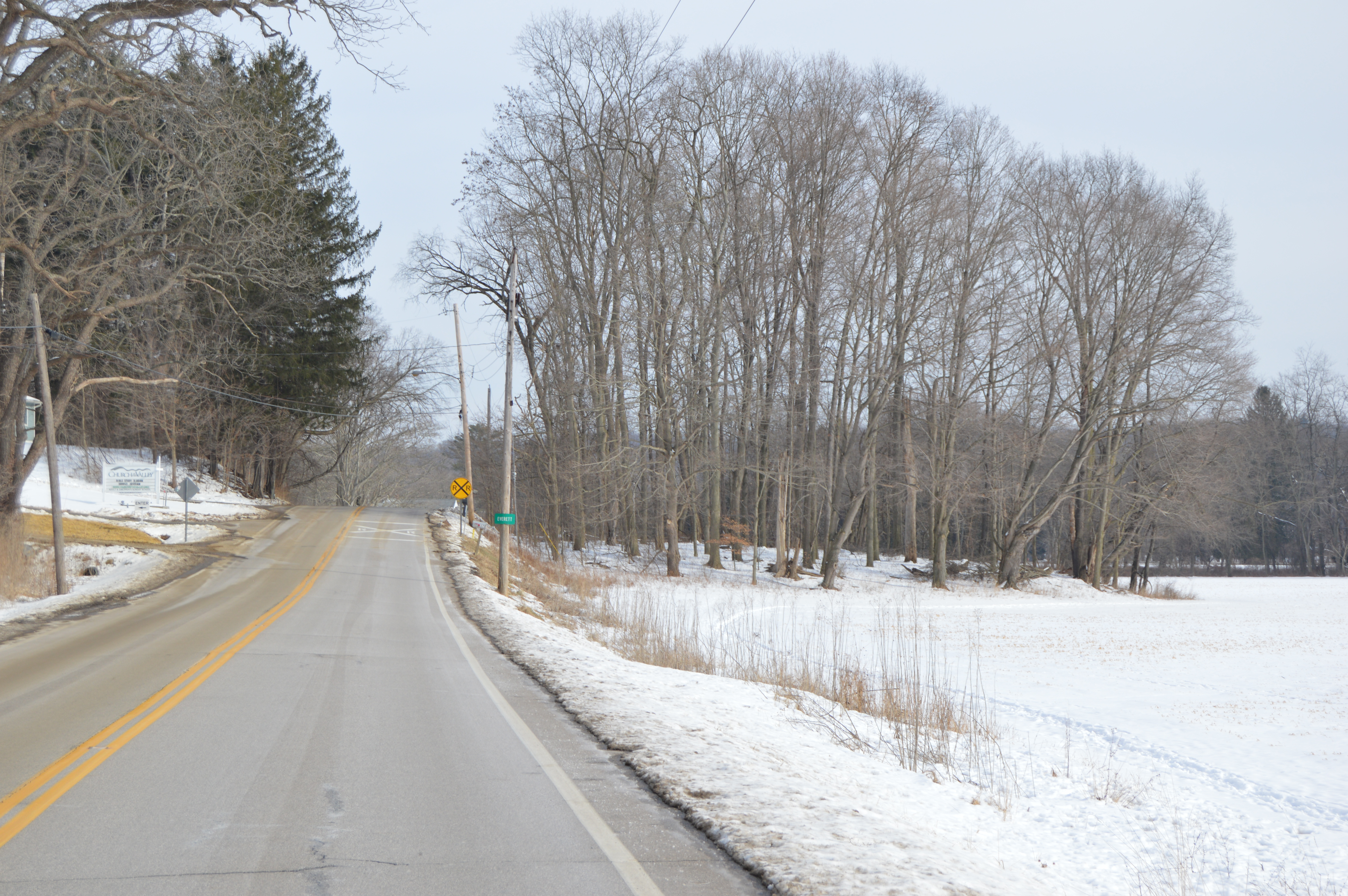
- The mound in 2015

- Location within Ohio Location within the United States
- Location: Everett, Ohio
- Nearest city: Everett, Ohio
- Coordinates: 41°12′16″N 81°34′33″W
- Built: ~200AD
- Part of: Cuyahoga Valley National Park, Everett Historic District
- NRHP reference No.: 77000157
- Added to NRHP: May 25, 1977

Everett Knoll Complex, also known as Everett Mound, is a Hopewell site in Northeast Ohio near the unincorporated community of Everett within Cuyahoga Valley National Park. It consists of a ~16 ft (4.9 m) diameter mound directly south of Everett road and habitation sites surrounding it.

Dating from the late Hopewell period between 200 and 500 AD, the mound consists of a 2.5 ft (0.76 m) diameter pit containing a hexagonal limestone crypt topped with a layer of silty clay. Stone and copper artifacts and human and animal remains were recovered from the crypt within the mound. Pottery shards, stone artifacts, and charred animal bones recovered from the surrounding area indicate habitation. It is one of the few known Hopewell sites in northeast Ohio and is smaller than the Hopewell sites found in southern Ohio.

The complex was discovered in 1875 when artifacts were unearthed when building a schoolhouse. The site was excavated in detail by a team from Case Western Reserve University in 1970.
