= Everett, Ohio =

Unincorporated community in Ohio, U.S.

Coordinates: 41°12′16″N 81°34′20″W

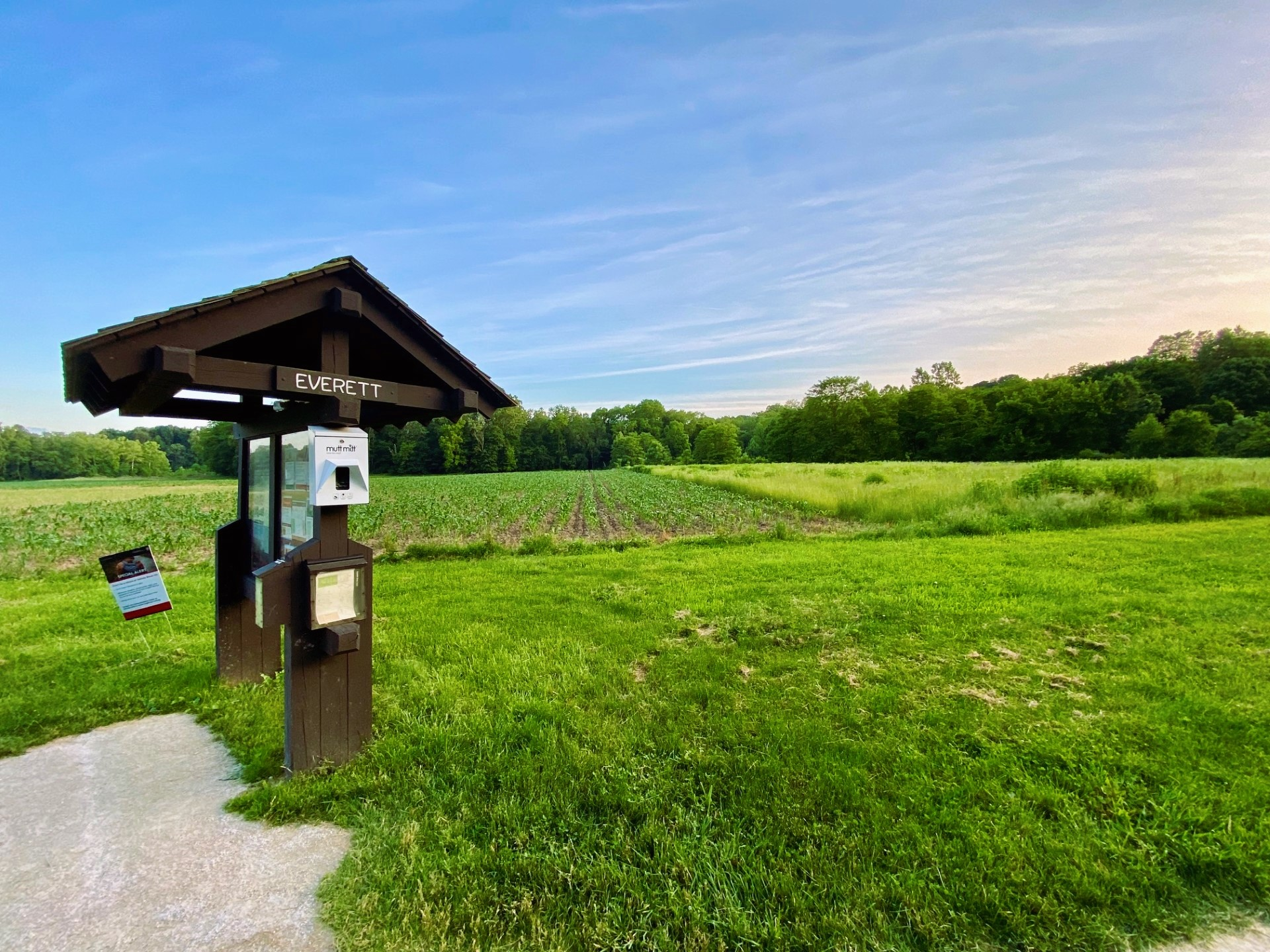
Trail Head for Everett Road Covered Bridge in Everett, Ohio

Everett is an unincorporated community in Summit County, in the U.S. state of Ohio.

== History ==
The Hopewell Culture inhabited the area by ~200AD and constructed the Everett Mound.

Early variant names for the area included Unionville and Johnnycake, on account of the johnnycake canal passengers resorted to eating during a flood which stopped traffic. The present name Everett honors a railroad official Sylvester T. Everett. A post office called Everett was established in 1880, and remained in operation until 1953.
