= Summit Metro Parks =

Metropolitan park system in Ohio

- Type: Public park district
- Location: Summit County, Ohio, United States
- Nearest city: Akron, Ohio
- Area: 14,000 acres (5,700 ha)
- Created: 1921
- Visitors: 5,000,000 annually
- Open: All year
- Website: www.summitmetroparks.org

Summit Metro Parks is a Metroparks system serving the citizens of Summit County, Ohio by managing 14,000 acres (5,700 ha) in 16 developed parks, six conservation areas and more than 150 miles (240 km) of trails, with 22.4 miles (36.0 km) of the Ohio & Erie Canal Towpath Trail.

The park district is fully supported by a levy, which voters are periodically asked to approve. Rangers are commissioned peace officers who provide safety and security by enforcing the park district's rules, regulations, state, and local laws.

== History ==
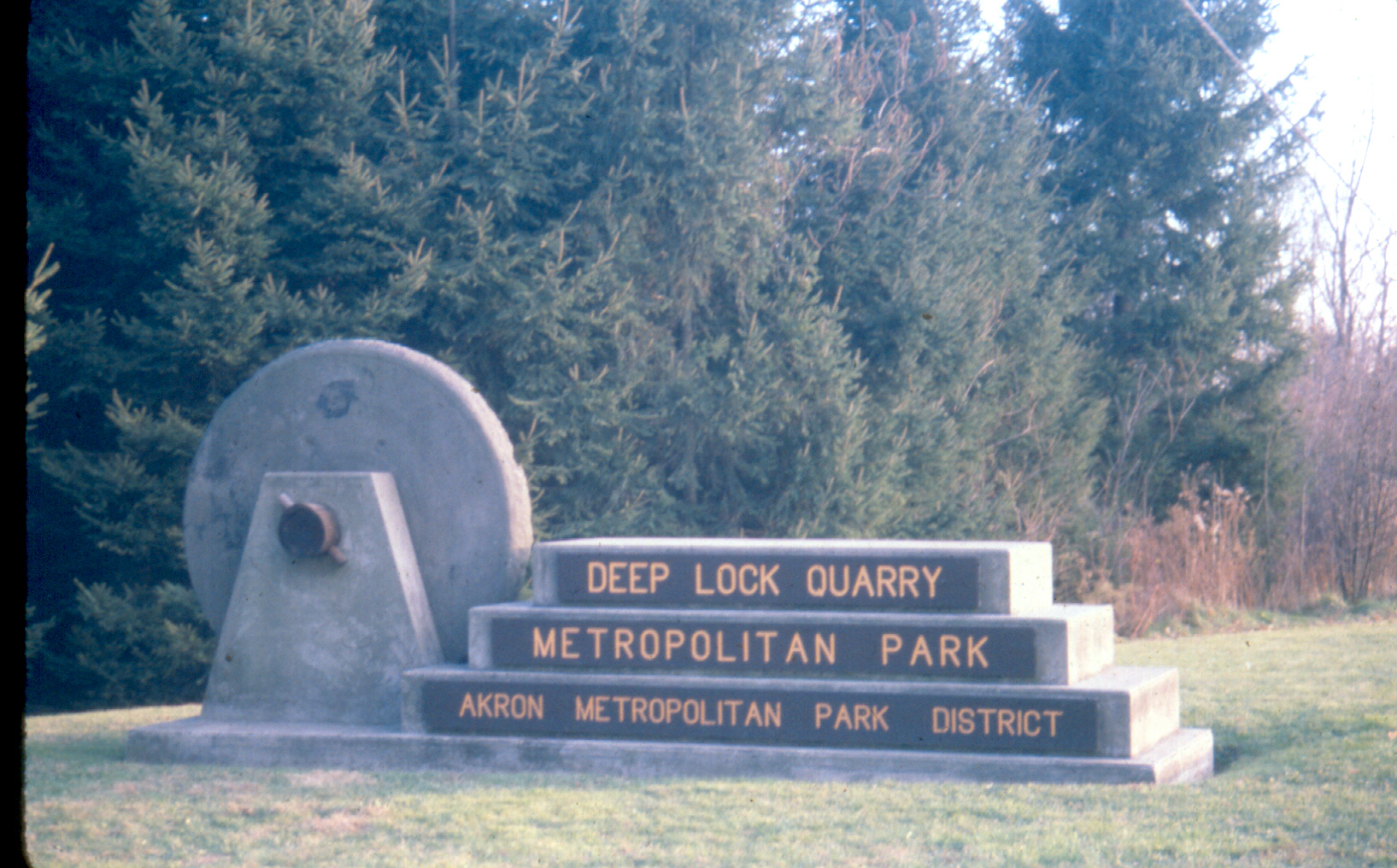
Akron Metropolitan Park District is now Summit Metro Parks

In times of war, people often look for ways to escape the news and demands of the era. During World War I, Americans increasingly looked to parks and natural areas for temporary diversions. Congress responded by creating the National Park Service in 1916, and the Ohio General Assembly made possible the formation of metropolitan park districts the following year.

In July 1917, Cleveland Metroparks became the first metropolitan park district in the State of Ohio. On December 31, 1921, Metro Parks (then called the Akron Metropolitan Park District) became the second park system established under Chapter 1545 of the Ohio Revised Code.

Progress was slow in the appointment of the first commissioners, perhaps due to the post-war economy. After more than a year, Summit County Probate Judge Lewis D. Slusser finally appointed James Shaw, Maude I. Milar and Charles B. Raymond. The trio's first meeting was May 15, 1923. The board considered several recreation projects, but things were generally slow-moving until 1925, when Shaw was replaced by Edmund D. Eckroad, chief engineer for the Northern Ohio Traction & Light Company, a predecessor of Ohio Edison, and Raymond was replaced by Frank A. Seiberling, founder of Akron's Goodyear Tire & Rubber Company.

With new board members in place, famous landscape architects the Olmsted Brothers were asked in May 1925 to create a countywide park plan and identify sites that were suitable for park use. Their famous father, Frederick Law Olmsted, designed major parks throughout the country, most notably New York's Central Park. The accomplished Olmsted Brothers, John C. and Frederick Jr., worked on parks in Baltimore, Seattle and New York.

In June, as Akron celebrated its centennial, Seiberling publicly accepted the first gift of land – a small, triangular plot on N. Portage Path with 150 feet of frontage at the intersection of Merriman Road. The land, donated by Joseph Courtney of the Courtney Dairy Company, was named Courtney Park. A boulder and bronze plaque were later dedicated by the Daughters of the American Revolution to commemorate the site. This bronze relief at the intersection of North Portage Path and Merriman Road commemorates the site of Courtney Park.

In 1926, the superintendent of Akron's city parks, Harold S. Wagner, was appointed the first director-secretary of the young park district. In his formative years, Wagner worked in Boston with the Olmsted Brothers, and later on projects owned by Seiberling. Between the late 1920s and the end of 1930, more than 1,000 acres were donated. Thanks to the generosity of prosperous local land owners, the young park system now included 1,600 acres in five reservations. To fund park projects and land acquisition, voters passed a .10-mill levy in November 1928.

Less than a year after the passage of the levy, the stock market crashed. Losses would reach $15 billion nationwide. Factories closed, banks failed and jobs became increasingly scarce. The Hoover administration took several steps to combat the Great Depression, but instability continued. After the 1932 presidential election, Franklin D. Roosevelt's New Deal would boost the economy, and the creation of a Civilian Conservation Corps, which put millions of laborers to work nationwide, enabled Metro Parks to launch new parks and complete many projects.

Today, Metro Parks manages 13,000 acres (5,300 ha), including 14 developed parks, six conservation areas and more than 125 miles (201 km) of trails, with 22.4 miles (36.0 km) of the Ohio & Erie Canal Towpath Trail. Annual attendance averages 4.5 million visitors.

== Parks ==
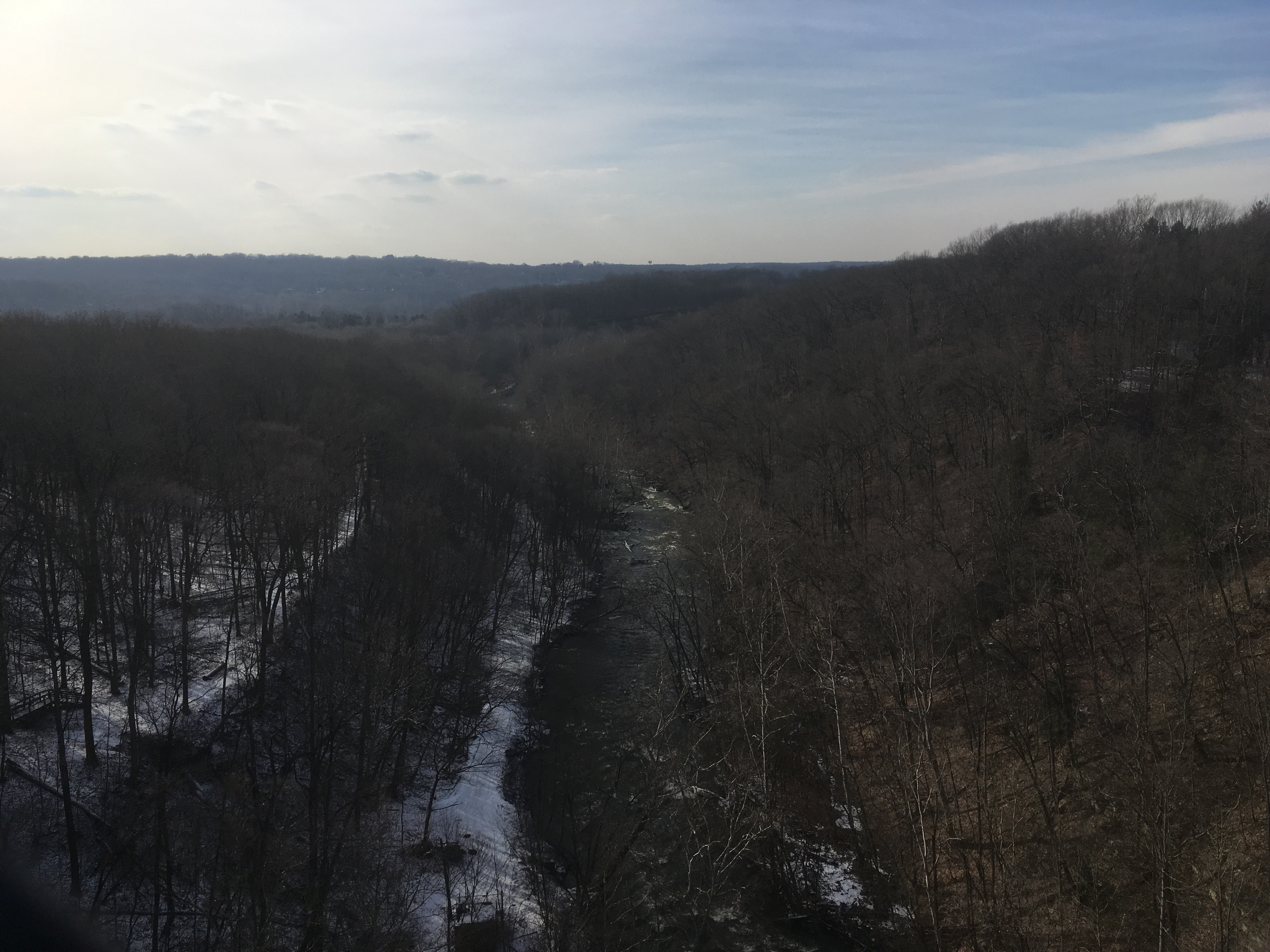
The Valley from N Main Street

- Cascade Valley/North in Akron 41°08′10″N 81°31′42″W

Named for Sherman and Mary Schumacher, who donated 171 acres to Metro Parks in 1968, Schumacher Valley remains one of the most rugged areas within the city of Akron. Located in the valley's pre-glacial bedrock canyon are steep-cut ravines indicative of the Cuyahoga River's tributary streams. A canopy of oak, American beech, sassafras and black cherry provides cover for smaller shrubs. There are herbs and wildflowers, including spring beauty, Jack-in-the-pulpit, rue anemone and jewelweed. Great horned owls, chickadees and six species of woodpecker take cover here.

ACTIVITIES: Hiking (Schumacher Trail 1.2 miles; Valley Link Trail 2.8 miles), Picnicking

- Cascade Valley/South in Akron 41°07′12″N 81°31′01″W

In 1833, hydraulic engineer and entrepreneur Eliakim Crosby built the Cascade Race, a waterway that powered the mills and businesses along the Ohio & Erie Canal. The Cascade Race helped transform Akron into a boomtown. Years later, Crosby built the failed Chuckery Race; traces of it can still be seen in this Metro Park. Today, fish here are prey for belted kingfishers and great blue or green-backed herons. Beautiful white trillium grows in the floodplain woods each spring beside wild ginger and several types of violets. Summer and fall wildflowers also flourish, illuminating the landscape. Several rare and unique natural features can be found within the Chuckery Area. South of the entrance drive, near the intersection of the Chuckery Trail, is a meadow that harbors many unusual plants and several species of showy wildflowers. Just up the hill from the meadow is prairie, where wild lupines bloom about mid-May. Other rare species can be found individually throughout the park, including butternut trees – a species surviving despite the butternut canker disease threatening their range. Less conspicuous, but no less rare, are crinkled hairgrass, satin brome and southern hairy rock cress.

ACTIVITIES: Hiking (Chuckery Trail 2.4 miles; Highbridge Trail 3.2 miles; Overlook 0.5 miles; Oxbow Trail 1.2 miles), Baseball/Softball, Cross-country Skiing, Fishing, Picnicking, Sledding, Soccer

- Cascade Locks in Akron 41°05′31″N 81°31′06″W

Here, along the Towpath Trail, the Cascade Locks tell the story of Akron's early industry. The steepest section of the Ohio & Erie Canal was between Akron and the Little Cuyahoga River. In a single mile, 15 locks, or "steps," were necessary to enable boats to climb the Continental Divide. Locks 10 through 16 form the Cascade Locks Area. The two buildings north of the parking lot and adjacent to Lock 15 are some of the oldest structures in Akron. The Mustill House and store, built between 1825 and 1850, served the local community and the people traveling the canal. The area was designated as National Historic District in 1992 and is listed in the National Register of Historic Places. Present throughout the area are native wildflower species, flowers brought by immigrants from Europe, and weeds carried by man, horse and canal boat. The tree population reflects both invasive plants and native trees that are able to flourish in inner-city conditions. Birds seen in this area include robins, blue jays, sparrows, cardinals and red-tailed hawks.

ACTIVITIES: Hiking, Picnicking

- Deep Lock Quarry in Peninsula 41°13′48″N 81°33′16″W

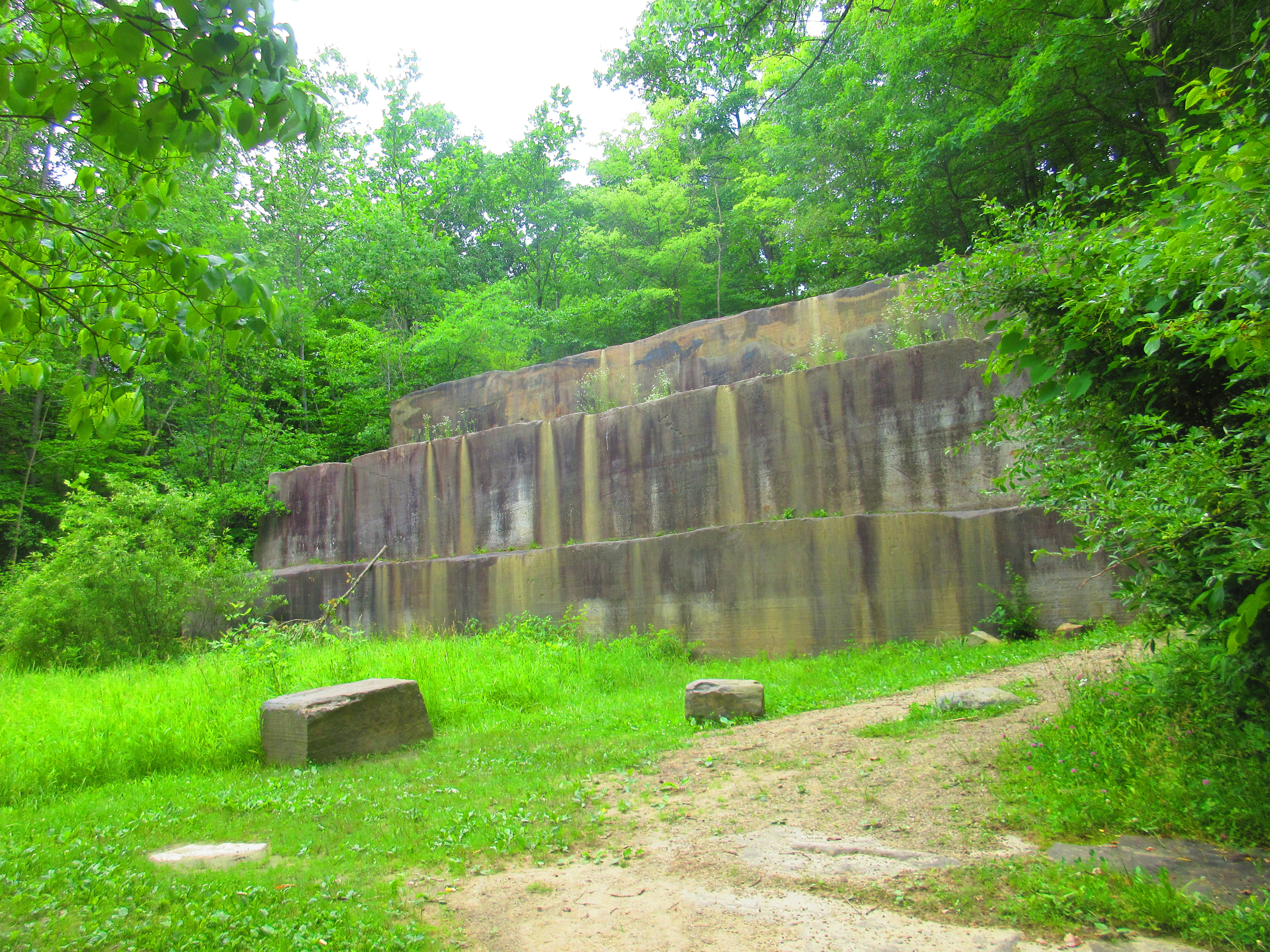
Remnants of the quarry

Within Deep Lock Quarry lies Lock 28, which at 17 feet was the deepest lock on the Ohio & Erie Canal, and an old quarry from which blocks of Berea sandstone were cut for the canal locks and other local structures. Ferdinand Schumacher, who is credited with introducing oatmeal to America by supplying it to Union troops during the Civil War, purchased a portion of the quarry in 1879. The sandstone found in the quarry was ideal for mill stones, which were used to remove the outer hulls of oats processed at Akron's American Cereal Works (later Quaker Oats). Stone was last taken from the quarry in the 1930s, when the Civilian Conservation Corps used the sandstone to construct several Metro Parks facilities, including Pioneer Shelter in Goodyear Heights Metro Park. Deep Lock Quarry became a Metro Park in 1934. Today, the park is home to more Ohio buckeye trees than any other Metro Park in Summit County. The old canal bed is home to frogs, turtles and salamanders. A shallow swamp has developed on the quarry floor, where rose pink (an herb) and the invasive narrow-leaved cattail grow.

ACTIVITIES: Hiking (Buckeye Trail; Cuyahoga Trail 13.1 miles; Quarry Trail 1.2 miles), Fishing, Picnicking

- Firestone in Akron41°00′54″N 81°31′04″W

Dairy cows once grazed the hillsides of the area known today as Firestone Metro Park. In 1949, Metro Parks received a gift of 89 acres from the Firestone Tire and Rubber Company. Acquisitions of nearby parcels expanded the park to 258 acres. In 1956, the Ohio Department of Natural Resources completed construction of a nearby dam, intended to create a reservoir for industrial water needs. As the reservoir of the adjacent Firestone Golf Course filled, the water table rose downstream, forming the large wetland and marshy meadows of Firestone Metro Park. Along with the Tuscarawas River and Tuscarawas Race, which once channeled water to the Ohio & Erie Canal, the area is home to fish, crayfish, frogs and turtles. The meadows and forest shelter foxes, coyotes, raccoons, skunks, muskrats, rabbits, mice, voles and moles, along with many beautiful summer and fall wildflowers. More than 175 bird species have been sighted in Firestone Metro Park, including various types of wrens, thrushes, warblers, woodpeckers, herons and ducks. A number of different raptors – including bald eagles – have also been spotted. A note to visitors: Poison sumac is found in the wet areas of Firestone Metro Park. This small tree/shrub contains a powerful skin irritant, similar to that of poison ivy. To avoid it, stay on designated trails.

ACTIVITIES: Hiking (Redwing Trail 1.1 miles; Walking Course 0.9 miles; Willow Trail 1.6 miles), Cross-country Skiing, Fishing, Picnicking, Sledding

- Furnace Run in Richfield 41°15′39″N 81°37′38″W

The 890-acre Furnace Run Metro Park began in 1929 when the family of Charles Francis Brush Jr. donated 272 acres to Metro Parks. Much of the park was developed by work relief crews during the 1930s. Brushwood Lake, a once-popular swimming spot before erosion and sedimentation forced its closing in 1956, was created by diverting the natural flow of the Furnace Run. Every March and April, thousands of daffodils bloom along the H.S. Wagner Daffodil Trail. Wagner, the first director of Metro Parks, owned the land off Brush Road and planted the first bulbs along the trail. After he retired in 1958, he sold the property to Metro Parks and the land became part of Furnace Run Metro Park. Today, along the Old Mill trail, be sure to look for the Brush Family marker, which reads: "To all those who love as he loved the far sky and smiling land." Just south of Brushwood Lake flows a recently restored stretch of stream. The award-winning environmental project recreated several thousand feet of habitat for aquatic wildlife and native fish, including a thriving population of rainbow darters, a sensitive species. The park contains beech-maple woods, acres of spring wildflowers – including trillium and Virginia bluebells – and deep ravines. Birds spotted in Furnace Run Metro Park include a variety of owls, hawks, herons, warblers and waterfowl. Downstream from the lake, the wet woods of sycamores, black walnuts, willows and shrubs welcome an occasional family of beavers. Brushwood Lake is home to fish, frogs and other aquatic wildlife.

ACTIVITIES: Hiking (Daffodil Trail 0.6 miles; Old Mill Trail 1.0 miles; Rock Creek Trail 1.2 miles), Cross-country Skiing, Fishing, Ice Skating, Picnicking, Sledding

- Goodyear Heights in Akron 41°04′46″N 81°27′02″W

Goodyear Heights Metro Park opened in 1930 after land was donated by Akron's Goodyear Tire & Rubber Company and the park district purchased 37 acres from resident Gilbert Waltz. During the Depression, Metro Parks acquired additional acres by paying delinquent taxes on surrounding properties. In the 1950s, the Goodyear Tire & Rubber Company donated more land. Thousands of pines and tulip trees were planted in the park. During World War II, Victory Gardens were planted along Newton Street on the former Waltz farm. In 1957, the Charles Goodyear Memorial Pavilion was constructed. It served as the park district's headquarters until 1974, when the offices were moved to Sand Run Metro Park. Today, the pines planted in this 410-acre park are slowly giving way to black cherries, oaks and tuliptrees through natural succession. Elsewhere, beech trees, sugar maples, basswoods, pin oaks, red maples and blackgum trees grow. In the north-central section, acidic soils support sassafras and sarsaparilla, species that were once used in beverage making. Along the edge of Alder Pond, a cattail marsh provides good wildlife habitat. The pond supports sphagnum moss and yellow birch trees, muskrats, nesting Canada geese and mallards. Late spring is a great time to view snapping turtles, some up to 20 pounds, basking in the sun. The park's woods are home to owls and other wildlife.

ACTIVITIES: Hiking (Alder Trail 1.4 miles, Parcours Trail 1.8 miles, Piney Woods Trail 2.0 miles), Baseball/Softball, Cross-country Skiing, Fishing, Picnicking, Sledding

- Gorge in Cuyahoga Falls 41°07′12″N 81°29′37″W

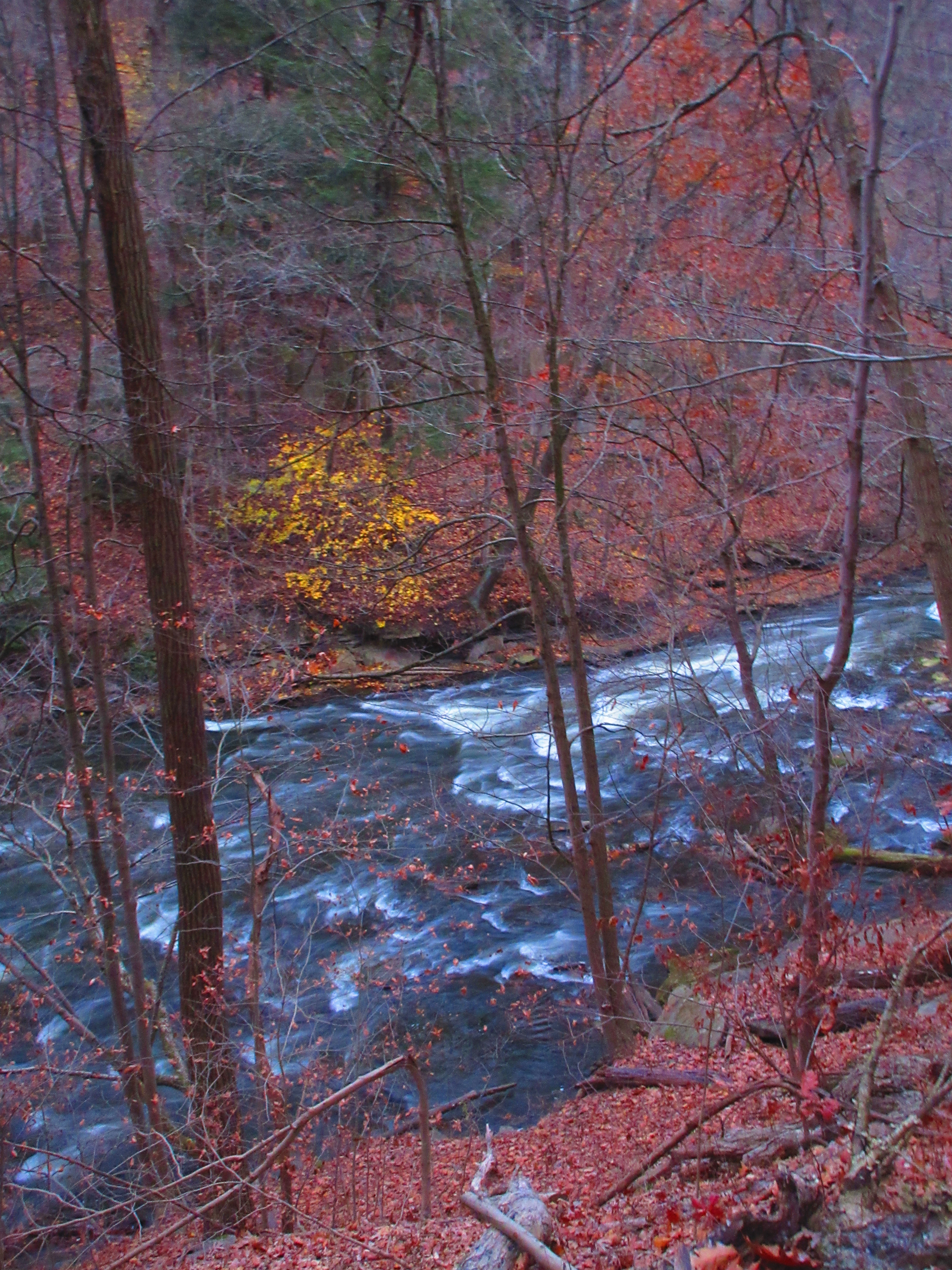
Rapids along the gorge

In 1759, a 12-year-old girl was captured in Pennsylvania by Delaware Indians and reportedly brought to a cave in present-day Gorge Metro Park, where she lived as a child of Chief Netawatwees. Young Mary Campbell, for whom the cave is named, unwittingly became the first white child in what was then the wild frontier of the Western Reserve. Mary later settled with the tribe in a village along the banks of the Cuyahoga River, not far from the cave. She was released in 1764 after a treaty ended the French and Indian War. Thousands of years before Mary's adventures, the Gorge was cut when glacial debris blocked the former route of the Cuyahoga River (near present-day downtown Akron) and caused the river to find a new course. Today, the rushing water flows over a shale riverbed, between ledges made of Sharon conglomerate sandstone. Oak, blackgum, tulip and yellow birch trees are common in the woods that cover the valley walls. This 155-acre Metro Park was made possible in 1930, when the Northern Ohio Traction & Light Company, the predecessor of Ohio Edison, donated 144 acres of land to Metro Parks. Previously, the area hosted a park of a different sort – the High Bridge Glens Amusement Park, which opened in 1882 and featured a thrilling roller coaster and a dance hall. It contains the FirstEnergy Dam.

ACTIVITIES: Hiking (Glens Trail 1.8 miles, Gorge Trail 1.8 miles, Highbridge Trail 3.2 miles), Fishing, Ice Skating, Picnicking

- Hampton Hills in Akron and Cuyahoga Falls 41°10′12″N 81°33′27″W

In 1964, the City of Akron needed flat land on which to build a water tower. It leased 116 acres of woods and ravines to Metro Parks in exchange for land within Goodyear Heights Metro Park. Three years later, Rhea H. and E. Reginald Adam donated 162 acres of adjacent farm land to Metro Parks, and the 278-acre Hampton Hills Metro Park was born. In 2010, the park district signed a lease for the adjacent Hardy Road landfill, bringing the park to its current size of 655 acres. More than 10,000 years ago, glaciers retreated from Northeast Ohio, carving ravines and valleys. The glacially-formed Adam Run Valley is home to an unusual plant called rush, which lines the banks of the stream. Along the trails, oak, elm, sycamore and black walnut trees provide habitat for a variety of birds and other wildlife. A grove of white pine, planted by Girl Scouts in the late 1960s, offers visitors a cool, scented respite. Today, at the Top O' the World Area, open fields contain milkwort, ironweed, Queen Anne's lace, goldenrods and asters. Bluebird boxes, which are monitored by volunteers, rise above the meadow grasses. Each summer, bluebirds sit perched atop the nest boxes, watching for their insect prey. Other notable bird species include woodcocks, wild turkeys and large birds of prey like red-tailed hawks. The hawks can be seen soaring above the meadows as they hunt for small voles and mice.

ACTIVITIES: Hiking (Adam Run 3.2 miles, Spring Hollow Trail 1.6 miles), Picnicking, Soccer

- Liberty in Twinsburg 41°19′22″N 81°24′28″W

Long before Liberty Park was formed, humans in prehistory camped here, drank the clean, cold springs and hunted game. Upon European settlement, trees were cleared for farming, but maples were spared for their sweet sap. Today, the 1,759-acre Liberty Park is a unique partnership between the City of Twinsburg and the park district. The city manages the park's 100-acre recreation area, including the play fields and playground. Metro Parks manages the remaining acreage, including two trails and the Pond Brook Conservation Area. Both areas are open 6 am to sunset. Large trees exist on rock ledges and in wetlands within the conservation area, where fens and bogs are "protected" by poison sumac and swamp rose. Metro Parks has designated this a Low Impact Area, meaning mowing, trails and other park improvements will be kept to a minimum. This protects the various species that live in the area's wetlands and vernal pools. Liberty Park harbors countless rare and endangered species, including Indiana bats, marsh wrens, ospreys and bald eagles. Other creatures seen here include beavers, long-tailed weasels, dragonflies, butterflies, red-backed salamanders, wood frogs and turtles. In July 2006, Audubon Ohio named Liberty Park an Important Bird Area.

ACTIVITIES: Hiking (Buttonbush Trail 1.6 miles, Sugarbush Trail 0.6 miles), Baseball/Softball, Picnicking, Play Equipment

- Munroe Falls in Munroe Falls 41°07′49″N 81°25′49″W

Before Metro Parks purchased 222 acres from the Renner family in 1978, John Renner owned and operated a swimming park here. In the 1930s, the family built a two-room summer cabin and dug a small fishing lake near the present park entrance. By 1935 they constructed a house and lived here year-round, and they soon realized their lake was popular with swimmers. To discourage visitors, they started charging 10 cents per visit, but this only attracted more people. To accommodate the new business, they created the current 13-acre lake in 1937 and named the place Renner Park. John Renner, an engineer who built many homes in Akron's Goodyear Heights area, also tried raising pigs on the southeast side of the lake. Price restrictions enacted during World War II made his farming venture unprofitable. In 2007, Metro Parks acquired the adjacent 287-acre former County Home property, bringing this park to its current 509 acres. Today, the sandy, acidic soils of Munroe Falls Metro Park permit the growth of flora that is typically uncommon in Summit County. Blueberries, shiny club moss, ground pine and a colony of Ohio haircap moss flourish here. Trees include black gum, sassafras and tulip. Beavers, frogs, turtles, salamanders and crayfish are seen in both Beaver and Heron ponds.

ACTIVITIES: Hiking (Indian Spring Trail 2.2 miles), Basketball, Boat Rental, Cross-country Skiing, Fishing, Picnicking, Play Equipment, Sledding, Swimming, Tennis, Volleyball

- F.A. Seiberling Nature Realm in Akron 41°08′24″N 81°34′33″W

Many parks exist due to the foresight of a few visionary individuals, including F.A. Seiberling. He donated more than 400 acres to expand Sand Run Metro Park. Land that he owned from 1920 to 1948 was purchased by Metro Parks in 1964 to become the Nature Realm. Native son Seiberling founded Goodyear Tire & Rubber in 1898. The company produced bicycle and carriage tires and went on to capture the automobile tire business. Seiberling's interests went well beyond tires. He helped form the original Akron Metropolitan Park District and was a member of the Board of Park Commissioners from 1924 to 1935. Today, the Nature Realm is a special-use area that has been set aside for the study and enjoyment of nature.

ACTIVITIES: Hiking (Cherry Lane Trail 0.6 miles, Fernwood Trail 0.5 miles, Seneca Trail 1.4 miles), Picnicking

- O'Neil Woods in Bath 41°10′14″N 81°35′27″W

William O'Neil, founder of General Tire and Rubber Company, and his wife Grace donated their 242-acre family farm to Metro Parks in 1972. Their son, M. Gerald O'Neil, served on the Board of Park Commissioners from 1969 to 1978. The O'Neil family had cattle and horses, and their old barn still stands; the structure is an ideal bat "condo." Other winged creatures in O'Neil Woods include eastern bluebirds, which nest in boxes maintained by staff and volunteers throughout the park. Eastern woodcocks, barred owls, pileated woodpeckers, song sparrows, kingfishers and ruffed grouse have been spotted among the park's oak, black willow, eastern cottonwood, sycamore and black walnut trees. Ferns and wildflowers carpet the ground. Yellow Creek, the cleanest tributary to the Cuyahoga River, harbors turtles, frogs and a variety of fish. Biologists believe this creek's fish will eventually re-colonize the polluted river as cleanup efforts continue.

ACTIVITIES: Hiking (Buckeye Trail, Deer Run Trail 1.8 miles), Picnicking

- Sand Run in Akron 41°07′57″N 81°33′39″W

The 1000-acre Sand Run Metro Park opened in 1929, but the area has been welcoming visitors for centuries. The land surrounding Mingo Pavilion was a campsite for Mingo Indians. Portage Path was once an important Native American trail between the Cuyahoga and Tuscarawas rivers; later, it was the western boundary of the United States. A high ridge above the Wadsworth Area was a lookout point for General Elijah Wadsworth, who made his camp near the present-day Old Portage Area during the War of 1812. In the 1930s, Sand Run Parkway and many of the surrounding shelters and structures were constructed by the Civilian Conservation Corps. In 1974, the park district's Administrative Offices were moved here from Goodyear Heights Metro Park. Today, visitors can drive through the ford crossing where Sand Run meanders across Sand Run Parkway. In the cool, shady ravines of Sand Run and its tributary streams, hemlocks, ferns, skunk cabbage and large colonies of horsetails grow. Each spring, large-flowered trilliums and other seasonal blooms appear, including bishop's cap, foam flower, bloodroot and pale violet. The towering forest is home to red, gray, black and fox squirrels; screech, barred and great horned owls; and pileated woodpeckers. Red-tailed hawks roost in the treetops when they are not soaring over the ridges. Many rare species inhabit the park, including sharp-shinned hawks, butternut trees, and native orchids. Near the intersection of Sand Run Parkway and Merriman Road is a small wetland that has become a highly productive amphibian breeding area. Every spring, the parkway is closed on nights when spotted salamanders migrate to this area for mating. The phenomenon has become a popular attraction for robust nature enthusiasts who often stand in the rain to witness hundreds of salamanders crossing the road. Other amphibians that breed in this area include spring peepers, wood frogs, American toads and green frogs.

ACTIVITIES: Hiking (Buckeye Trail, Dogwood Trail 1.8 miles, Jogging Trail 6.0 miles, Mingo Trail 3.3 miles, Parcours Trail 1.4 miles, Valley Link Trail 2.8 miles), Ice Skating, Picnicking, Sledding, Soccer

- Silver Creek in Norton 40°59′46″N 81°40′55″W

The 624-acre Silver Creek Metro Park is tucked away in a quiet, rural area near Norton. Observant visitors will see traces of the past. Open fields, fence rows and a stately old barn, part of which dates back to the Civil War, are evidence of the park's former life as the Harter Dairy Farm. Other secrets are less visible. Buried beneath the surface is a maze of tunnels and shafts – remnants of a 19th-century mining operation. The one-time farm has changed a great deal since Metro Parks acquired the land in 1966. Thousands of trees have been planted, and the bathhouse and 50-acre lake – fed by a spring from an old mine near Wall Road – were built in the early 1990s. Today, iron-laden water from the mine shafts feed into Silver Creek, coating the bottom of the stream with reddish-brown iron-oxide, yet fish, frogs and other animals thrive. The open fields are home to woodcocks, meadowlarks and eastern bluebirds. Many butterflies flutter among the flowers and grasses. Hawks circle overhead to hunt rabbits, mice and voles living in the grasses and weeds below. Deer travel among the woods, fields and wetlands. Tall sycamores grow in soggy areas, and hickory woods grow in drier spots. The beech-maple woods contain spring wildflowers. One of the largest northern red oaks in Summit County – 20 feet in circumference – stands in this park.

ACTIVITIES: Hiking (Bridle Trail 7.9 miles, Chippewa Trail 2.0 miles, Pheasant Run Trail 1.2 miles), Boat Rental, Cross-country Skiing, Fishing, Picnicking, Play Equipment, Swimming

- Springfield Bog in Springfield Township 41°00′40″N 81°23′52″W

This much-anticipated Metro Park, is the first in southeast Summit County, and is now open. The trail is marked and the parking lot is completed. However, there are no restrooms, and more changes will be coming in the next few years during this "Watch Us Grow" phase. In the future, the restored prairie will attract butterflies and birds like bobolinks, meadowlarks and rails – all grassland nesting species.

ACTIVITIES: Hiking (Prairie Trail)

- Tallmadge Meadows in Tallmadge, Ohio, Summit County

This Metro Park was recently built off of 91. There are two trails, Meadow Loop and Meadow Trail. Meadow Loop is an easy .35 miles of flat land. Meadow Trail is right next to the parking lot and is 2.0 miles through the woods and passes the County Home cemetery.

ACTIVITIES: Hiking

=== Other ===
- Bike & Hike Trail, a completely paved 33.5-mile (53.9 km) multipurpose trail, one of the first "rails to trails" conversions in the county with trailheads in Sagamore Hills, Northfield Center, Boston Heights, Stow, Munroe Falls, and Hudson

The 33.5-mile Bike & Hike Trail was one of the first "rails to trails" conversions in the country. It follows the course of the old Akron, Bedford & Cleveland (ABC) Railroad, which was the longest electric railroad of its kind when it was built in 1895. Until service was discontinued in 1932, riders could travel for 50 cents from Akron to Cleveland's Public Square in about 2.5 hours. Today, east of Route 91 in Munroe Falls, the Bike & Hike Trail parallels a scenic section of the Cuyahoga River where great blue herons, Canada geese and a variety of ducks can be seen. A small pond along the north side of the trail annually hosts a chorus of spring peepers. South of Boston Mills Road in Boston Heights, the Sharon Conglomerate rock walls of the Boston Ledges rise along the trail. Farther north, the trail travels along Brandywine Road. A parking area adjacent to the bridge over I-271 offers rest and a view of Brandywine Falls which, at 75 feet, is one of the highest waterfalls in Ohio.

ACTIVITIES: Biking, Cross-country Skiing, Hiking, Picnicking, Rollerblading

- Ohio & Erie Canal Towpath Trail, a multipurpose trail that follows the abandoned Ohio and Erie Canal, with trailheads in Akron, Barberton, New Franklin, and Clinton

The Ohio & Erie Canal was a technological marvel. The inland waterway incorporated a series of sandstone locks that enabled boats to climb differences in elevation along the Continental Divide. The steepest section of the canal was between Akron and the Little Cuyahoga River. In a single mile, 15 locks, or "steps," were necessary. Canal boats, which were pulled by mules on the towpath, made it possible to ship goods from the Great Lakes (Lake Erie) to the Gulf of Mexico (via the Ohio and Mississippi rivers). Locally, the canal, which opened between Cleveland and Akron in 1827, can be directly credited with the growth of Akron. The city's population swelled thanks to the bustling activity surrounding the tight bundle of canal locks.

By 1878 the canal's significance was in decline due to the introduction of railroads. After the Great Flood of 1913 the canal was abandoned – less than 100 years after it opened. For many years the canal was largely forgotten about or ignored. The concept of restoring the towpath for use as a multipurpose trail began to emerge in the 1980s, and the first section of the Towpath Trail opened in 1993. Almost overnight, visitation doubled in Cuyahoga Valley National Park. Restoration of the towpath quickly spread to municipalities and neighboring park districts, including Metro Parks, Serving Summit County.

Akron Area (Botzum to the Innerbelt/SR-59): Along this 9.28-mile stretch the Cuyahoga and Little Cuyahoga rivers provide habitat for a variety of aquatic wildlife. Birds include herons, geese, ducks and kingfishers. Frogs and salamanders mate and lay eggs in the pools that collect in the flood plains. Water-loving native and non-native trees and shrubs dominate the area. Native species include cottonwood, sycamore, elm and silver maple; their chewed stumps signal beaver activity. Wildflowers abound along the sunny, shrub-less sections of the trail.

Barberton Area (Waterloo Road to Snyder Avenue): Plants that thrive in disrupted soils dominate along this 5.11-mile stretch; they include both native and invasive species. Shrubs include sumac, blackberry and the invasive Japanese knotweed while trees include boxelder, black locust and the invasive tree-of-heaven. Summer and fall wildflowers include Queen Anne's lace, yarrow, teasel, evening primrose and common mullein. The Tuscarawas River and the water-filled canal provide habitat for a variety of aquatic wildlife. Beavers, muskrats, painted and musk turtles, and several types of frogs may be observed along the canal. Kingfishers and great blue herons may be seen stalking fish.

PPG Industries (Eastern Road to Center Road): This 4.54-mile section is built on land leased from PPG Industries. From 1899 until 1973, liquid and solid waste products from the company's chemical plant – mostly lime and water slurry with some sand and salts – were pumped into six settling ponds here called Lime Lakes, covering a total of more than 600 acres. Water was drained from the Lime Lakes, leaving behind fine-grained lime deposits up to 50 feet deep. The resulting flat, barren landscapes were too alkaline and nutrient-poor for plants to grow. In the early 1980s PPG began restoring the local environment, amending the lime deposits with nutrient-rich bio-solids, or sludge, from municipal wastewater treatment plants, a practice often used in farming. Next, vegetation was planted in the artificial soil to reduce the amount of rain that filtered through. The result: Wildlife, including painted turtles, ring-necked pheasants and white tailed deer, has returned to the reclaimed Lime Lakes.

Clinton Area (Center Road to the Stark County line): Along this 2.6-mile section the rich, often-saturated soil of the river floodplain supports an abundance of wildflowers from spring to fall, luring a variety of insects including many butterflies. A number of tree species can be found along the trail, especially those which thrive in wet areas, including hackberry, elm, silver maple and swamp white oak.

ACTIVITIES: Biking, Camping, Cross-country Skiing, Fishing, Hiking, Picnicking

== Conservation Areas ==
In addition to 13 developed parks and more than 120 miles of trails, Metro Parks manages several conservation areas for the purpose of preserving Summit County's natural resources. While these conservation areas are not officially open to the public, most are accessible via neighboring trails.

- Columbia Run Conservation Area

Surrounded by Cuyahoga Valley National Park, this 366-acre conservation area is characterized by steep ravines and nearly-mature forests. Columbia Run flows through the area and supports several communities of coldwater fish, including southern redbelly dace, a rare minnow. Rare birds have been observed here as well, including cerulean warblers, an Ohio species of concern. This area is accessible via the statewide Buckeye Trail.

- Kniss Conservation Area

The smallest of our named conservation areas, the 73-acre Kniss Conservation Area was donated by the Nature Conservancy in 1974. It is adjacent to Bath Nature Preserve, which is managed by the Bath Township Park System. At one time, these woods were considered one of the best local examples of a beech-maple forest ecosystem.

- Riding Run Conservation Area

This 705-acre conservation area includes fields and forests that support rare plants. One such species is the butternut tree, which is being attacked by a fungus throughout its range. Black-throated green warblers have been observed here, and Furnace Run – one of the cleanest tributaries to the Cuyahoga River – flows through parts of this area. Portions of Riding Run are leased for sweet corn production and continue a long tradition of agriculture in the valley. Corn can be seen growing off Everett Road and will eventually find its way to Szalay's Farm, a regional attraction for many people traveling through Cuyahoga Valley National Park. The conservation area is accessible via neighboring bridle trails.

- Waldo Semon Conservation Area

This 122-acre conservation area was donated in 1974 by Waldo Semon, an employee of Akron's B.F. Goodrich Company who invented a way to make PVC (vinyl) useful. The woods are accessible via trails maintained by Cuyahoga Valley National Park. The Stanford Trail has a short spur that takes visitors to Averill Pond, home to beavers, herons and many amphibian species. Several rare plant species grow here, including satin brome and wild rice.

- Wetmore Conservation Area

In 1974, the National Park Service acquired thousands of acres that were managed by Metro Parks, including Virginia Kendall Park. Despite this acquisition, Metro Parks retained 572 wooded acres – today's Wetmore Conservation Area. It includes great forests, steep ravines and high-quality stream corridors. The land is accessible via bridle trails maintained by Cuyahoga Valley National Park.
