= Boston Mill station =

Train station in Ohio

Boston Mill
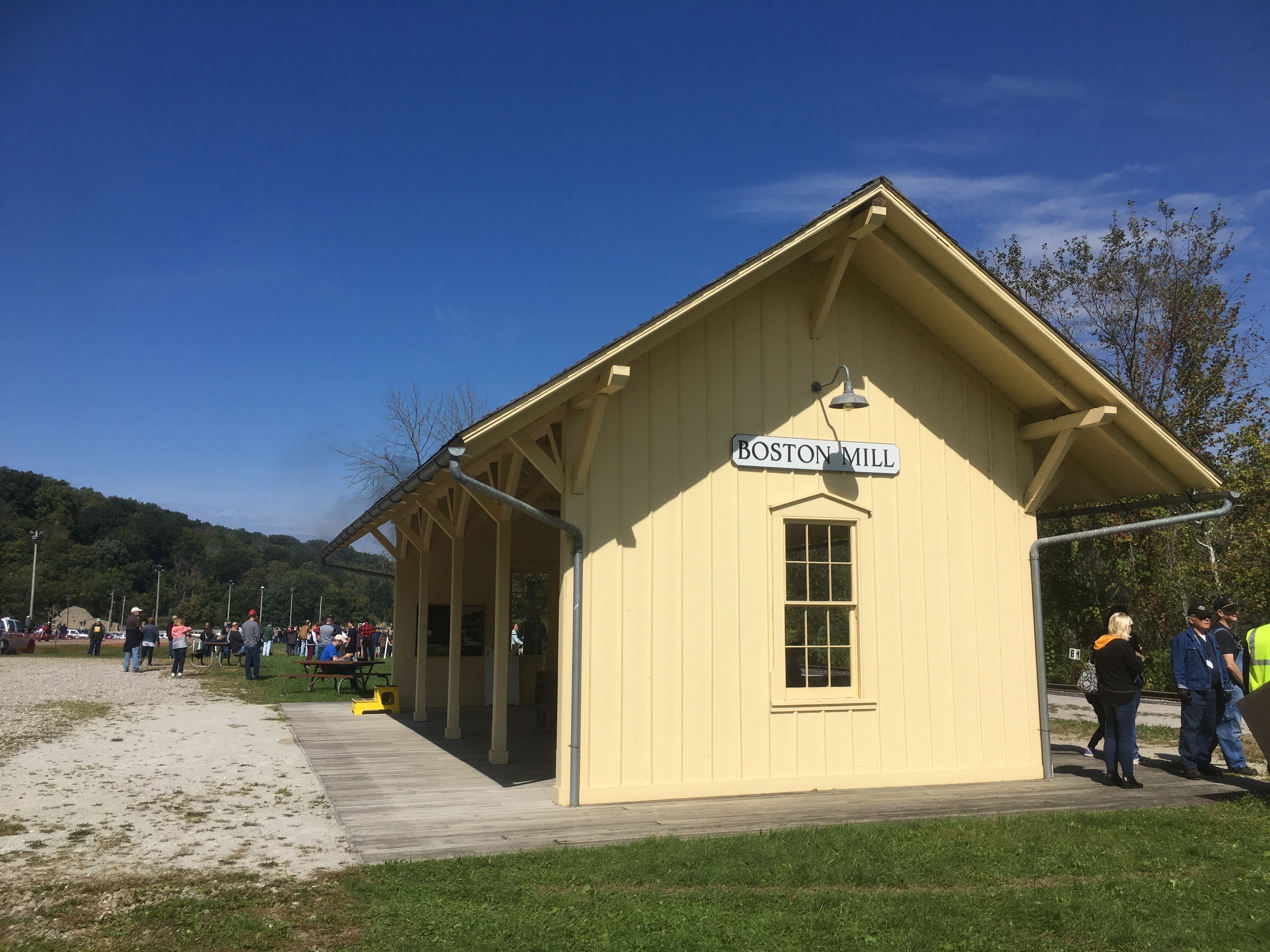
- Boston Mill in 2018

General information
- Location: 7029 Riverview Road; Peninsula, Ohio 44264
- Coordinates: 41.2656°N 81.5634°W
- Owner: Cuyahoga Valley Scenic Railroad
- Operator: Cuyahoga Valley Scenic Railroad
- Line: Valley Railway
- Platforms: 1 side platform
- Tracks: 1

Construction
- Parking: Yes
- Accessible: yes

History
- Opened: 1880
- Rebuilt: c. 2000s

Services
Preceding station	Cuyahoga Valley Scenic Railroad	Following station
Brecksville toward Rockside	Explorer	Peninsula toward Akron Northside
Former services
Preceding station	Baltimore and Ohio Railroad	Following station
Brecksville toward Cleveland	Cleveland – Akron – Valley Junction Until 1940s	Peninsula toward Valley Junction
Location

Boston Mill is a Cuyahoga Valley Scenic Railroad train station in Boston Township, Ohio, with a street address in Peninsula, Ohio. It is located at the intersection of Riverview Road and Boston Mills Road in the Cuyahoga Valley National Park.

== History ==
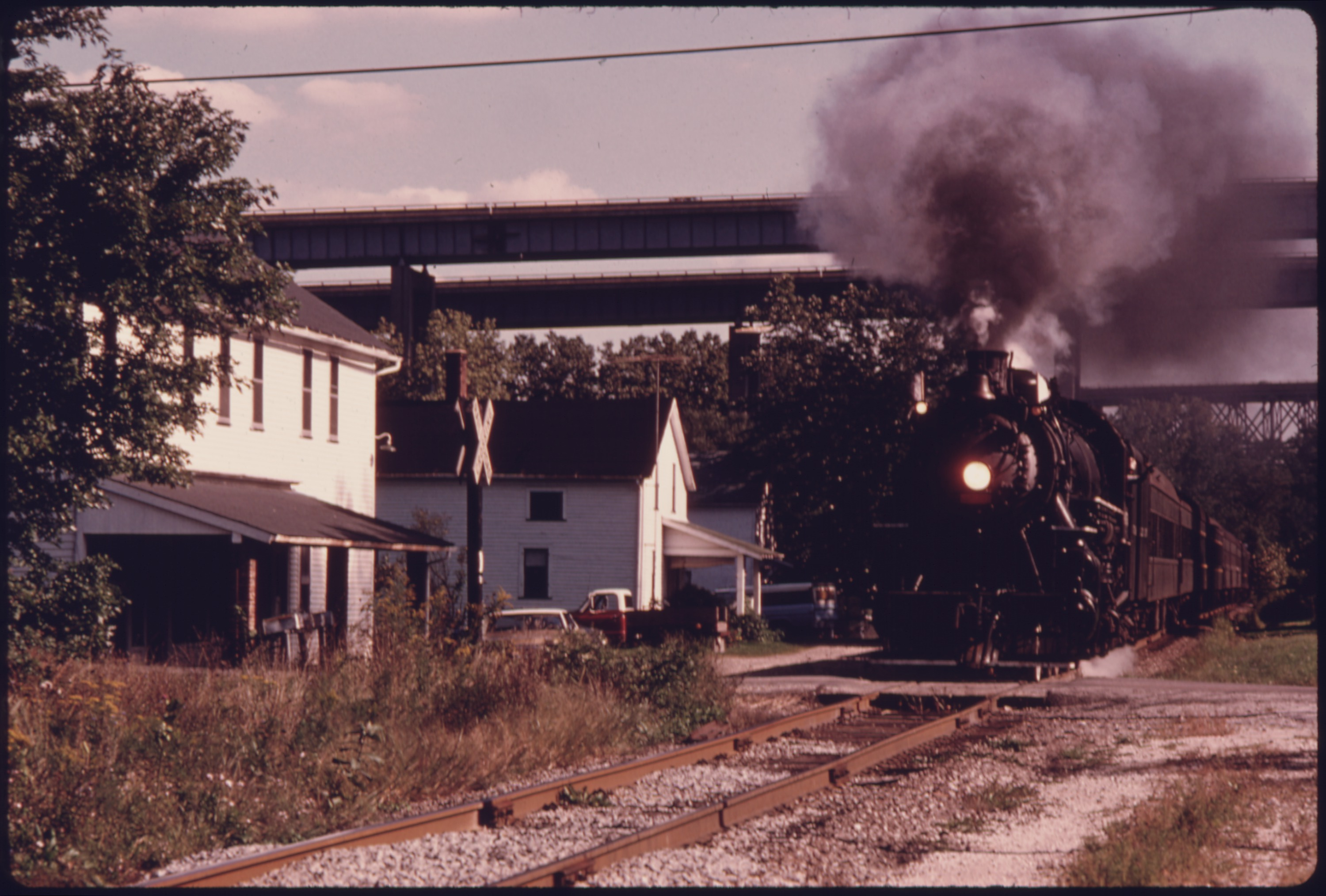
Boston Mill in 1975

Initially a stop on the Valley Railway, trains began regular service at Boston in 1880 as a flag stop. The station building was moved to Peninsula in 1968, becoming the Peninsula Depot. A new station was constructed by the National Park Service south of the old depot location to serve the Cuyahoga Valley Scenic Railroad.
