= Indigo Lake station =

Indigo Lake
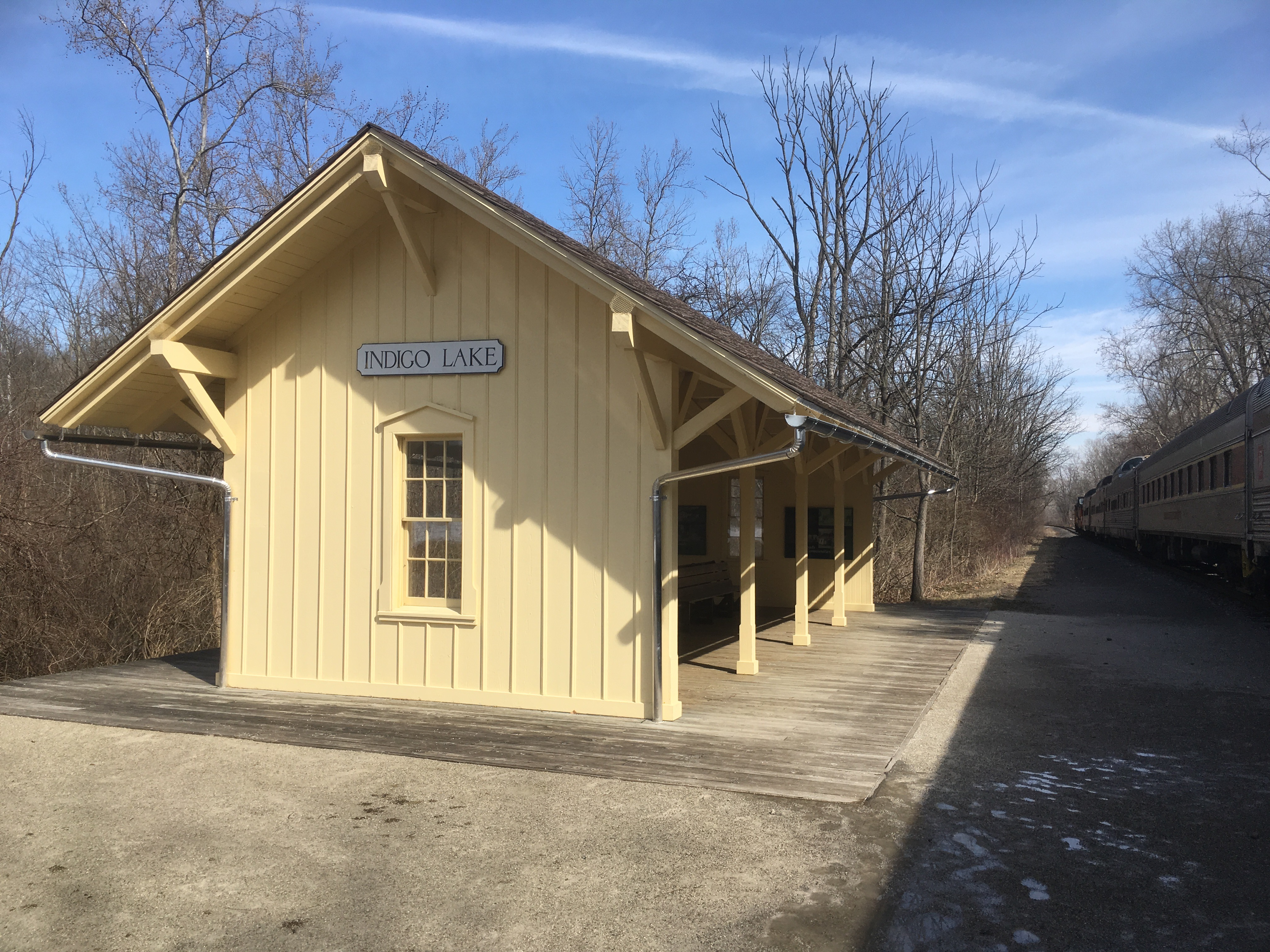

General information
- Location: 4300 Riverview Road; Peninsula, Ohio 44264
- Coordinates: 41.1941°N 81.5793°W
- Owner: Cuyahoga Valley Scenic Railroad
- Operator: Cuyahoga Valley Scenic Railroad
- Line: Valley Railway
- Platforms: 1 side platform
- Tracks: 1

Construction
- Parking: 12
- Accessible: yes

Services
Preceding station	Cuyahoga Valley Scenic Railroad	Following station
Peninsula toward Rockside	Explorer	Botzum toward Akron Northside
Location

Indigo Lake is a Cuyahoga Valley Scenic Railroad train station in Cuyahoga Falls, Ohio, with a street address in Peninsula, Ohio. It is located adjacent to Indigo Lake and Riverview Road in the Cuyahoga Valley National Park.
