= Brecksville station =

Brecksville
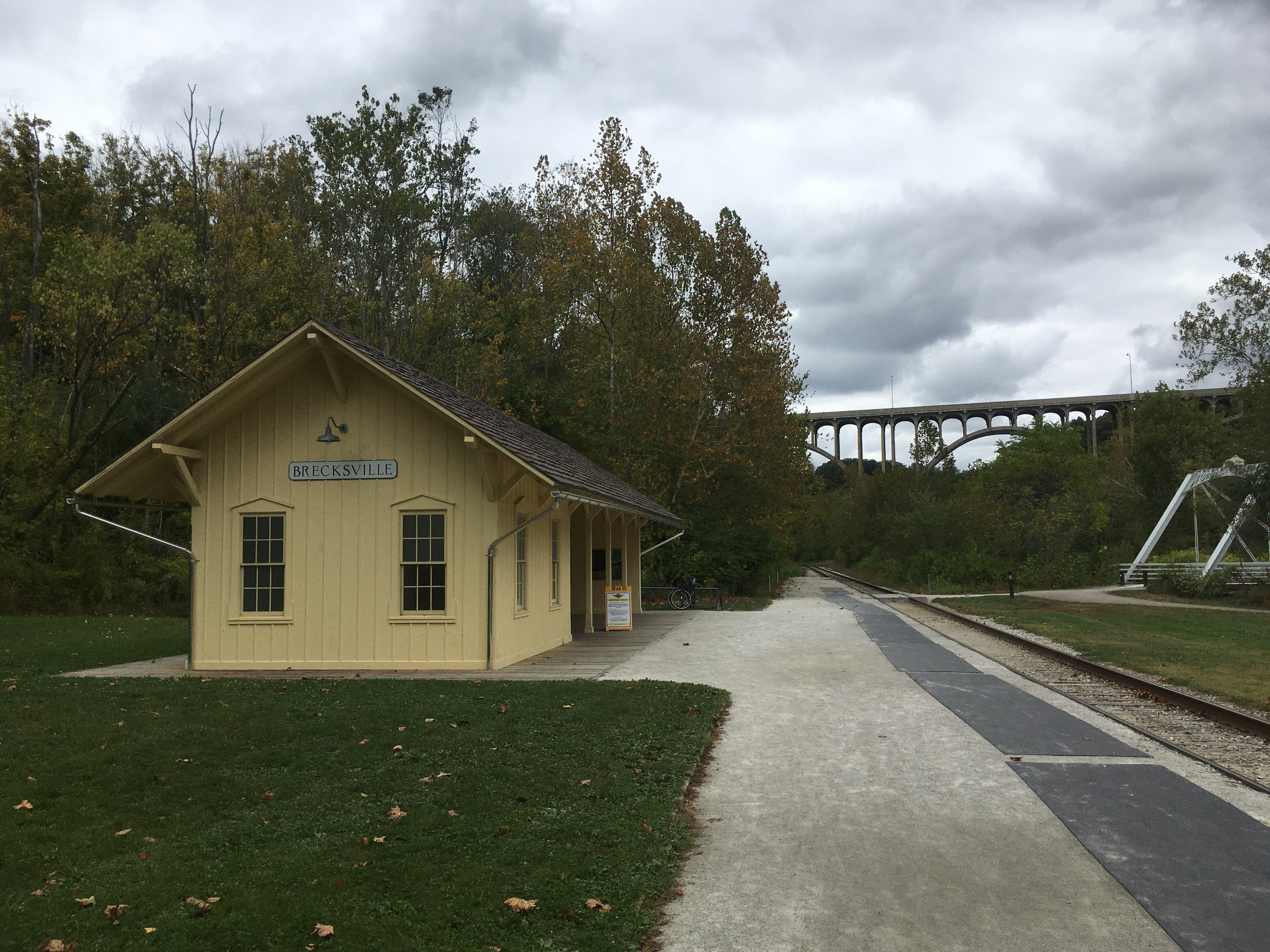

General information
- Location: 13512 Station Road; Brecksville, Ohio 44141
- Coordinates: 41.3190°N 81.5881°W
- Owner: Cuyahoga Valley Scenic Railroad
- Operator: Cuyahoga Valley Scenic Railroad
- Line: Valley Railway
- Platforms: 1 side platform
- Tracks: 1

Construction
- Parking: 165
- Accessible: yes

History
- Opened: 1880

Services
Preceding station	Cuyahoga Valley Scenic Railroad	Following station
Canal Exploration Center toward Rockside	Explorer	Boston Mill toward Akron Northside
Former services
Preceding station	Baltimore and Ohio Railroad	Following station
Cleveland Terminus	Cleveland – Akron – Valley Junction Until 1940s	Boston Mill toward Valley Junction
South Park toward Cleveland	Cleveland – Akron – Valley Junction Until 1940s	Boston Mill toward Valley Junction
Location

Brecksville is a Cuyahoga Valley Scenic Railroad train station in Brecksville, Ohio. It is located at the end of Station Road in the Cuyahoga Valley National Park.

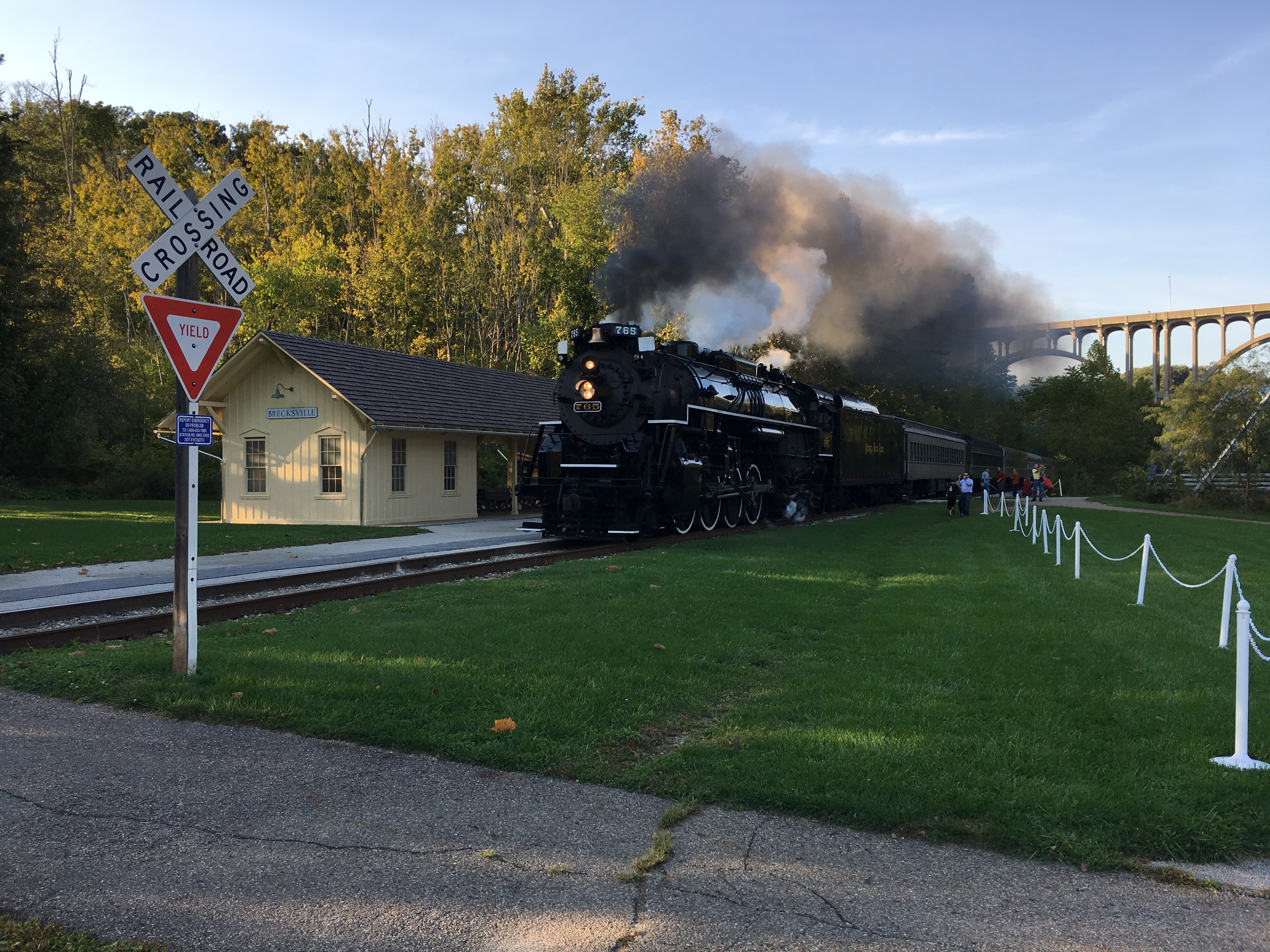
NKP 765 at Brecksville

Initially a stop on the Valley Railway, trains began regular service at Brecksville in 1880.

== Cultural references ==
Brecksville station was used as a filming location for the 2022 movie A Man Called Otto.
