= Brecksville, Ohio =

- City
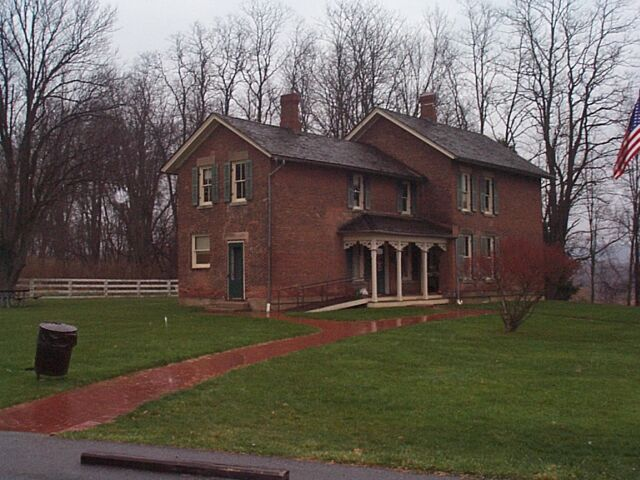
- Jonas Coonrad House in Brecksville

- Seal
- Motto: "A Community of the Western Reserve"
- Interactive map of Brecksville, Ohio
- Location within Ohio Location within the United States
- Coordinates: 41°18′36″N 81°37′44″W
- Country: United States
- State: Ohio
- County: Cuyahoga
- Founded: 1811
- Incorporated: 1921 (village); 1960 (city)

Government
  - Mayor: Daryl J. Kingston (R)

Area
  - Total: 19.56 sq mi (50.66 km^{2})
  - Land: 19.45 sq mi (50.37 km^{2})
  - Water: 0.11 sq mi (0.29 km^{2})
- Elevation: 889 ft (271 m)

Population (2020)
  - Total: 13,635
  - Estimate (2023): 13,850
  - Density: 701.1/sq mi (270.69/km^{2})
- Time zone: UTC−5 (Eastern (EST))
  - Summer (DST): UTC−4 (EDT)
- ZIP Code: 44141
- Area code: 440
- FIPS code: 39-08364
- GNIS feature ID: 1064483
- Website: www.brecksville.oh.us

Brecksville is a city in southern Cuyahoga County, Ohio, United States. The city's population was 13,635 at the 2020 census. It is a suburb of Cleveland and is included in the Cleveland metropolitan area.

== History ==
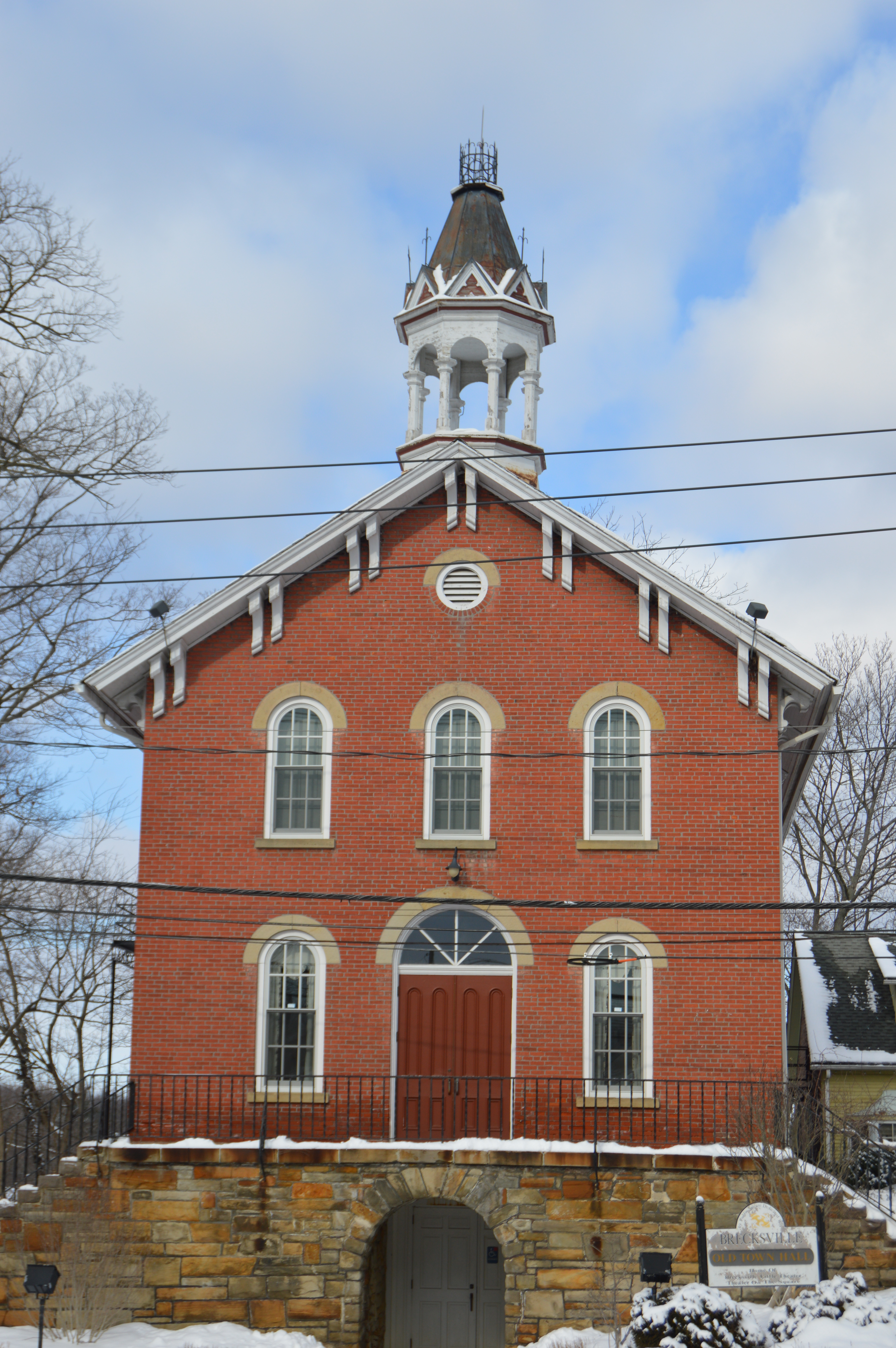
Brecksville Town Hall

Brecksville was founded in 1811, four years after several men—including Colonel John Breck—purchased the surrounding area. After the land was surveyed, Seth Payne, one of the surveyors, brought his family and settled in the area in June 1811, and he was soon followed by many other families. Although Colonel Breck never lived in Brecksville, his three sons did, and members of his family continued to live in Brecksville until 1934, when his great-grandson Dr. Theodore Breck died. An early historical account of Brecksville was written by William R. Coates and published by The American Historical Society in 1924.

Brecksville was incorporated as a village in 1921, and it gained the status of city in 1960.

== Geography ==
Brecksville is defined by its wooded bluffs and ravines which are a result of the geological confluence of the Glaciated Allegheny Plateau and the Great Lakes Basin. Brecksville's eastern border is traversed by the Cuyahoga River and borders Sagamore Hills Township and Boston Township, southern border Richfield Township (all three townships in Summit County), western border Broadview Heights and northern border Independence.

== Demographics ==
Historical population
Census	Pop.	Note	%±
1880	116		—
1930	1,308		—
1940	1,900		45.3%
1950	2,665		40.3%
1960	5,435		103.9%
1970	9,137		68.1%
1980	10,132		10.9%
1990	11,818		16.6%
2000	13,382		13.2%
2010	13,656		2.0%
2020	13,635		−0.2%
2023 (est.)	13,850		1.6%

As of the latest 2023 census updates, the median income in the city was $122,546 and the per capita income for the average family of three was $186,093. Of the city's population over the age of 25, 61% hold a bachelor's degree or higher.

=== Racial and ethnic composition ===
Brecksville city, Ohio – Racial and ethnic composition Note: the US Census treats Hispanic/Latino as an ethnic category. This table excludes Latinos from the racial categories and assigns them to a separate category. Hispanics/Latinos may be of any race.
Race / Ethnicity (NH = Non-Hispanic)	Pop 2000	Pop 2010	Pop 2020	% 2000	% 2010	% 2020
White alone (NH)	12,578	12,594	12,283	93.99%	92.22%	90.08%
Black or African American alone (NH)	254	237	103	1.90%	1.74%	0.76%
Native American or Alaska Native alone (NH)	4	7	6	0.03%	0.05%	0.04%
Asian alone (NH)	337	470	480	2.52%	3.44%	3.52%
Native Hawaiian or Pacific Islander alone (NH)	0	1	3	0.00%	0.01%	0.02%
Other race alone (NH)	7	9	28	0.05%	0.07%	0.21%
Mixed race or Multiracial (NH)	66	146	461	0.49%	1.07%	3.38%
Hispanic or Latino (any race)	136	192	271	1.02%	1.41%	1.99%
Total	13,382	13,656	13,635	100.00%	100.00%	100.00%

=== 2020 census ===
As of the 2020 census, Brecksville had a population of 13,635, 5,455 households, and 3,897 families. The population density was 697.8 inhabitants per square mile (269.4/km^{2}), the average household size was 2.43, and the average family size was 3.00.

The median age was 47.8 years; 21.0% of residents were under the age of 18, and 23.7% were 65 years of age or older. For every 100 females there were 97.0 males, and for every 100 females age 18 and over there were 94.9 males age 18 and over.

Of the 5,455 households, 27.9% had children under the age of 18 living in them, 62.5% were married-couple households, 13.0% had a male householder with no spouse or partner present, and 21.3% had a female householder with no spouse or partner present; 24.8% of all households were made up of individuals, and 14.2% had someone living alone who was 65 years of age or older.

There were 5,750 housing units, of which 5.1% were vacant; among occupied housing units, 87.2% were owner-occupied and 12.8% were renter-occupied. The homeowner vacancy rate was 1.1% and the rental vacancy rate was 9.7%.

92.1% of residents lived in urban areas, while 7.9% lived in rural areas.

=== 2010 census ===
As of the census of 2010, there were 13,656 people, 5,349 households, and 3,883 families residing in the city. The population density was 697.8 inhabitants per square mile (269.4/km^{2}). There were 5,623 housing units at an average density of 287.3 per square mile (110.9/km^{2}). The racial makeup of the city was 93.3% White, 1.7% African American, 0.1% Native American, 3.4% Asian, 0.3% from other races, and 1.1% from two or more races. Hispanic or Latino of any race were 1.4% of the population.

There were 5,349 households, of which 30.9% had children under the age of 18 living with them, 62.9% were married couples living together, 6.9% had a female householder with no husband present, 2.8% had a male householder with no wife present, and 27.4% were non-families. 24.7% of all households were made up of individuals, and 11.2% had someone living alone who was 65 years of age or older. The average household size was 2.50 and the average family size was 3.00.

The median age in the city was 47.4 years. 22.8% of residents were under the age of 18; 5.3% were between the ages of 18 and 24; 18.1% were from 25 to 44; 36.2% were from 45 to 64; and 17.8% were 65 years of age or older. The gender makeup of the city was 49.9% male and 50.1% female.

== Economy ==
Companies such as Lubrizol Corporation, Duck Creek Energy, Inc., MedData, Inc., True North Energy, LLC, Applied Medical Technology, Inc., The Ahola Corporation, Clinical Technology, Inc., NEC Corporation, Curtiss-Wright Corporation and PNC Financial Services are either headquartered or have sizable operations in the city. The Cleveland Clinic Data Center is located in Brecksville.

In 2018, Brecksville accepted the deed from the federal government for the land previously occupied by the U.S. Department of Veterans Affairs Hospital. The 200-acre (81 ha) site is located at the intersection of Interstate 77 and Miller Road. The site is currently being developed as a mixed use development called Valor Acres. When completed, the development will include the new DiGeronimo Co. headquarters, the Sherwin Williams research center, offices, apartments and condominiums, a 120-room hotel, and 150k square feet of retail and entertainment.

== Arts and culture ==
The 2023 Tom Hanks' film A Man Called Otto was partially filmed at the Cuyahoga Valley Scenic Railroad's Brecksville Station on Riverview Road.

Brecksville was cited by Soviet filmmaker Lev Kuleshov as the hometown of his protagonist, Mr. West in his 1924 comedy The Extraordinary Adventures of Mr. West in the Land of the Bolsheviks.

The Brecksville Theatre, with performances held in the Old Town Hall, was conceived on July 1, 2017, as a product of the merger of two longstanding Brecksville theatre groups:

- Brecksville Little Theatre (BLT) formed in 1941 and incorporated as a non-profit community organization in 1949 under charter by the State of Ohio. With a rich history of community theatre, BLT showcased many performances including the 1951 comedy "Here Today" directed by nearby Shaker Heights native Paul Newman.
- Brecksville Theater on the Square (BTOTS) was founded in 1975. Besides family theater, it arranged drama classes and programs for students, pre-school through adults.

The Brecksville Center for the Arts is a non-profit, multidisciplinary art center.

== Parks and recreation ==
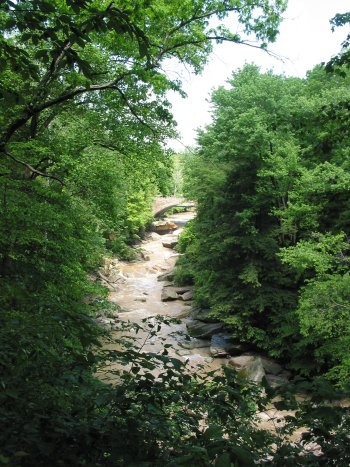
Chippewa Creek in the Brecksville Reservation, the largest park in the Cleveland Metroparks system

Many neighborhoods in Brecksville are adjacent to the Brecksville Reservation of the Cleveland Metroparks and the Cuyahoga Valley National Park, one of the most visited National Parks in the country. The Brecksville Reservation consists of over 3,000 acres.

Sleepy Hollow Golf Course is located in Brecksville and owned and operated by the Cleveland Metroparks.

Along with the Cleveland Metroparks and Cuyahoga Valley National Park, Brecksville has a Human Resources and Community Center.

== Education ==
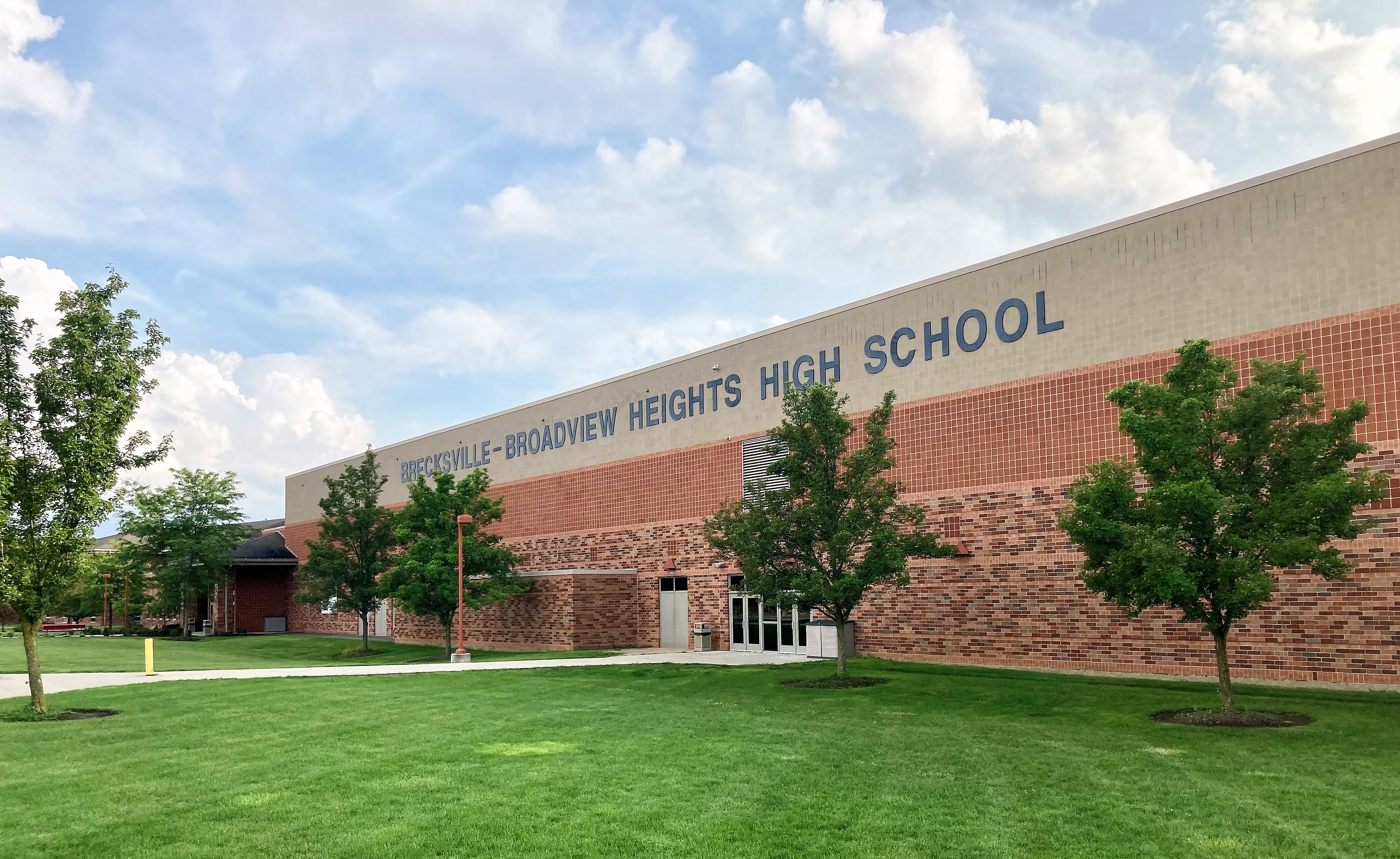
Brecksville–Broadview Heights High School

=== Public library ===
There is a branch of the Cuyahoga County Public Library in Brecksville, which opened in 1950, near the Brecksville Community Center and Kids Quarters play area.

=== Early education program ===
In 1972, the Brecksville Police Department began the Safety Town Program. Safety Town is an early education program designed for children entering kindergarten. Children attend Safety Town 2 hours per day for two weeks. During that time they learn about a variety of safety topics taught by Brecksville Police Department staff and a wide variety of guest speakers including but not limited to firemen, nurses, park rangers, and lifeguards. A miniature town complete with streets, houses, traffic signs and a working traffic light is set up outside the classroom. Children learn traffic signs and rules as they drive peddle cars around the town. They can also park their cars and practice pedestrian safety on the town's sidewalks and crosswalks.

=== Public schools ===
Brecksville is part of the Brecksville–Broadview Heights City School District along with neighboring Broadview Heights. Brecksville–Broadview Heights Elementary School (Pre-K-5) is located at the Blossom Hill education and recreation complex in Brecksville. Brecksville–Broadview Heights Middle School, for grades 6–8, and Brecksville–Broadview Heights High School (BBHHS), for grades 9–12, are located on a campus that spans the border between Brecksville and Broadview Heights. The school district, which serves approximately 4,000 students, is highly rated by the Ohio Department of Education, U.S. News & World Report and was awarded the 2024 National Blue Ribbon Award for academic excellence. Additionally, BBHHS has won several state championships in athletics, particularly in the sport of gymnastics.

=== Private schools ===
Julie Billiart Schools, Brecksville is a Catholic founded education program that serves students from Kindergarten through 8th grade with mild to moderate autism, anxiety, ADHD, dyslexia, and other learning differences.

South Suburban Montessori School, located in Brecksville's Blossom Hill Complex, provides a Montessori education to children between 18 months and 14 years of age.

=== Colleges ===
Stautzenberger College has a campus in Brecksville. Associate degrees and Board certifications are offered in:

- Veterinary Technology, Animal Welfare, Animal Grooming
- Paralegal Studies
- Diagnostic Cardiovascular Sonography, Diagnostic Medical Sonography

Cuyahoga Community College affiliate Cuyahoga Valley Career Center – School of Nursing offers full and part-time degree programs.

== Transportation ==
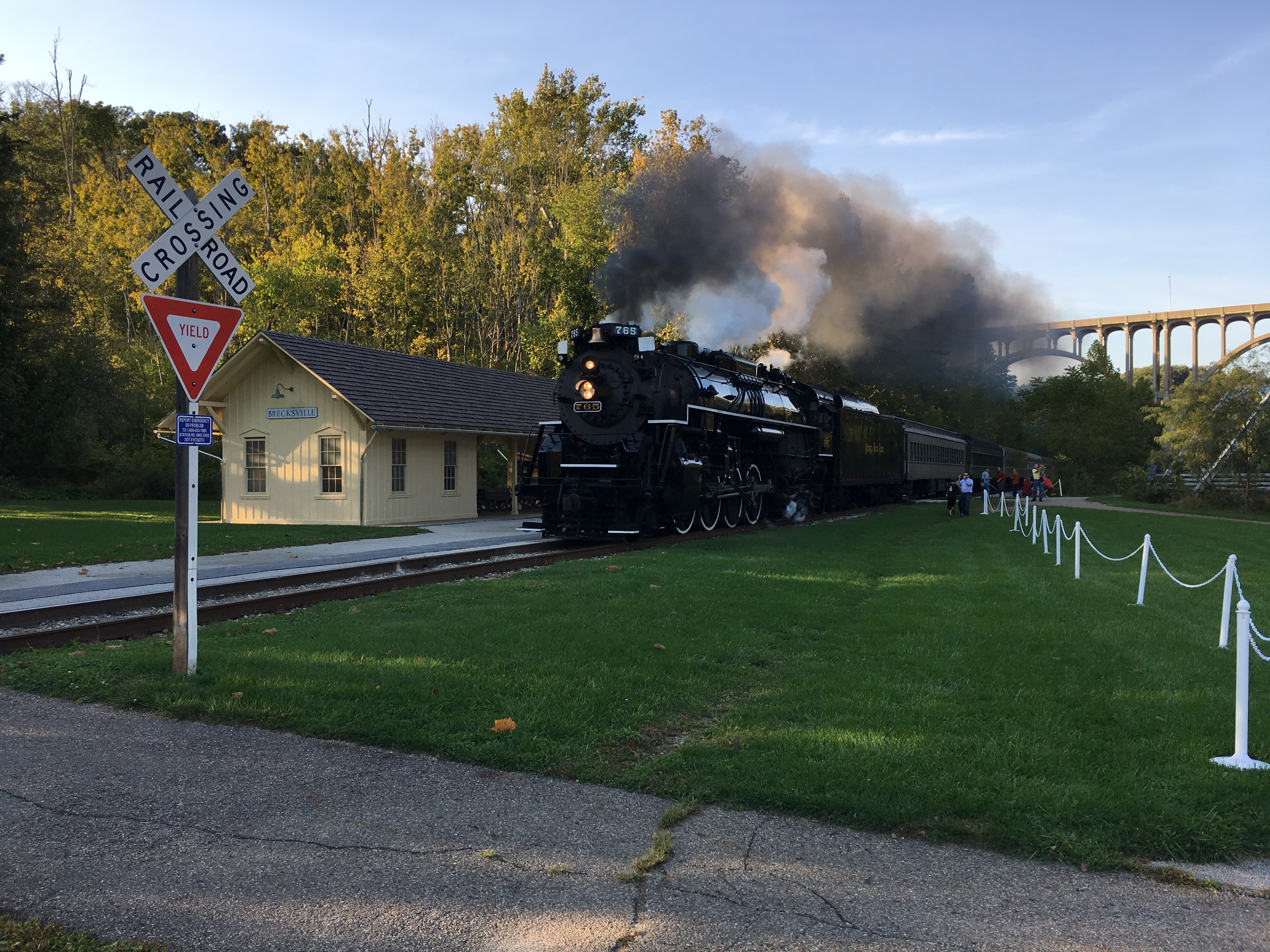
Brecksville station along the Cuyahoga Valley Scenic Railroad

=== Highways ===
Brecksville's major thoroughfares are State Route 21 (Brecksville Road) north and south, and State Route 82 (Royalton Road west of SR 21, Chippewa Road east of SR 21). Interstate 77 and Interstate 80, which carries the Ohio Turnpike, all pass through the city. I-77 has two exits in Brecksville and is the main connection to Cleveland and Akron. The Ohio Turnpike and I-80 are accessible from the I-77/SR 21 interchange with the Turnpike just south of the Brecksville city limits in neighboring Richfield.

=== Mass transit systems ===
The city is served by the 77 bus route from the Greater Cleveland Regional Transit Authority, which runs between Brecksville and downtown Cleveland. It is also on the 101 bus route from Akron's METRO Regional Transit Authority, which goes to downtown Akron. A transfer point between the two lines is located in Brecksville at the intersection of Miller Road and Southpoint Boulevard.

== Healthcare ==
Cleveland's MetroHealth System has a 63,200-square-foot, emergency room-medical center in Brecksville.

Akron Children's Hospital has a branch in Brecksville.

A Cleveland Clinic Express - Urgent Care and Outpatient Center has a facility in Brecksville.

Brecksville Surgery Center, specializing in Ophthalmology surgery, is based in the city.

== Notable people ==
=== Authors, poets and writers ===
- Eunice Gibbs Allyn – late 19th, early 20th century American correspondent, author, and artist
- Florence Morse Kingsley – late 19th, early 20th-century writer of popular and religious fiction
- Constance Laux – mystery and romance novelist
- John O'Brien – American author
- Kathryn Reiss – author of award-winning children's and young adult fiction; graduate of Brecksville-Broadview Heights High School
- Joshua Stacher – political scientist and scholar of Middle East politics, authoritarianism, and social movements

=== Cinema, radio, television and theater ===
- Ryan Dunn – American stunt performer, television personality, comedian, actor, writer, musician – buried in Brecksville, Ohio Cemetery
- Gus Heege – 19th-century playwright and actor
- Ann Liguori – sports radio and television broadcaster, graduated from Brecksville-Broadview Heights High School
- George Veras – Emmy Award winning television producer

=== Government ===
- Pamela Barker – United States district judge of the United States District Court for the Northern District of Ohio

=== Sports ===
- John Adams – Cleveland Guardians sports superfan
- Tom Brown – National Football League football player
- Matt Cross – wrestler
- Carol Dewey – college volleyball coach at Purdue University
- Steve Gillespie – Professional Arena Soccer League player and graduate of Brecksville-Broadview Heights High School
- John Johnson (safety) – NFL football player
- Eric Musselman – NBA and college coach and graduate of Brecksville-Broadview Heights High School
- Mike Rose – professional football player and graduate of Brecksville-Broadview Heights High School
- Scott Roth – basketball player in the National Basketball Association (NBA) and graduate of Brecksville-Broadview Heights High School
- Mark Schulte – soccer player in Major League Soccer
- Charlie Sifford – golfer
- Ed Sustersic – NFL football player
- Tom Tupa – Super Bowl winning football player in the NFL who lives in Brecksville and graduated from Brecksville-Broadview Heights High School
- Christen Westphal – soccer player in the National Women's Soccer League
