= Botzum station =

Botzum
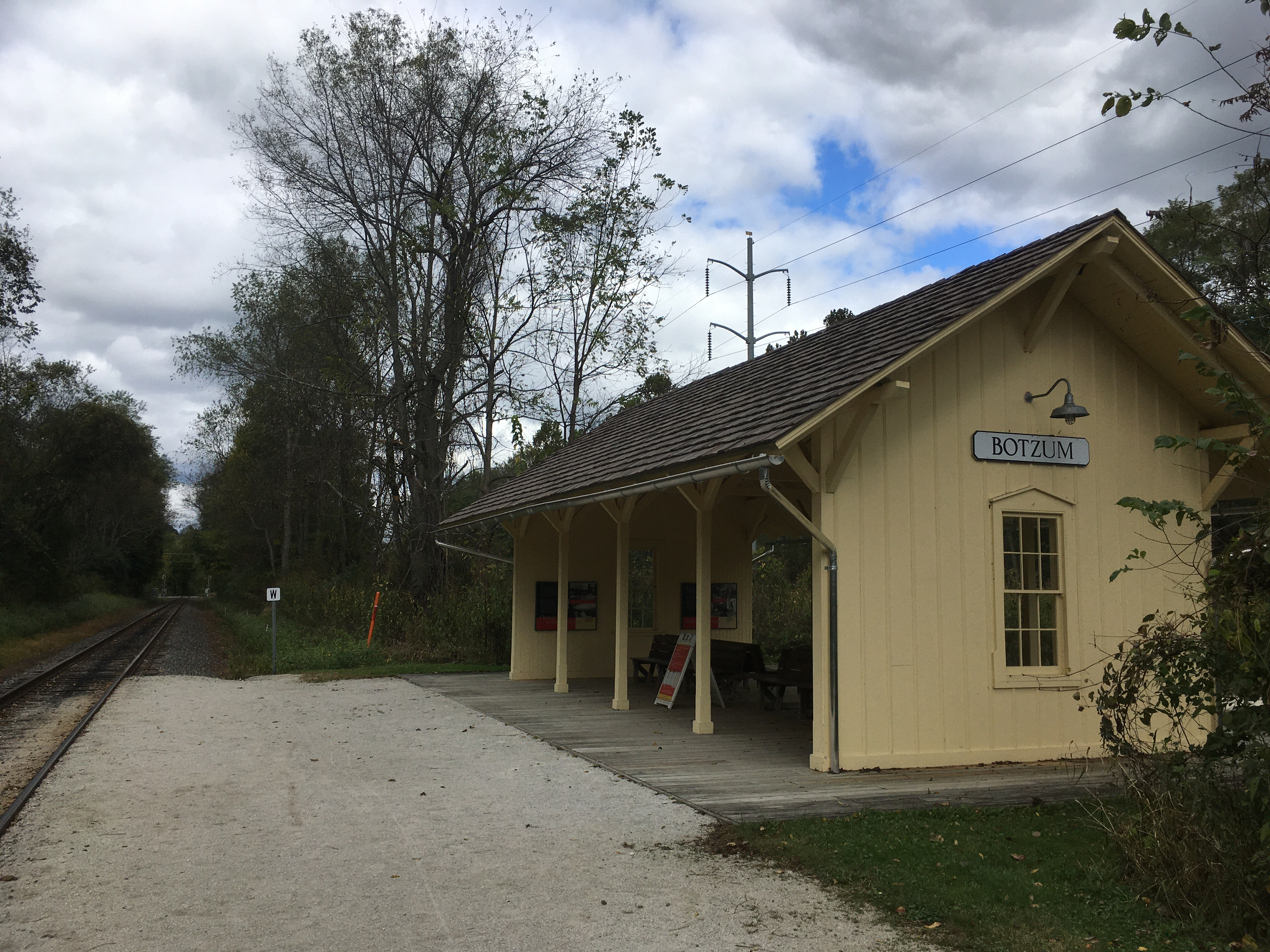

General information
- Location: 2912 Riverview Road; Akron, Ohio 44313
- Coordinates: 41.1595°N 81.5752°W
- Owner: Cuyahoga Valley Scenic Railroad
- Operator: Cuyahoga Valley Scenic Railroad
- Line: Valley Railway
- Platforms: 1 side platform
- Tracks: 1

Construction
- Parking: yes
- Accessible: yes

History
- Opened: 1880

Services
| Preceding station | Cuyahoga Valley Scenic Railroad | Following station |
|---|---|---|
| Indigo Lake toward Rockside | Explorer | Akron Northside Terminus |
Former services
| Preceding station | Baltimore and Ohio Railroad | Following station |
|---|---|---|
| Peninsula toward Cleveland | Cleveland – Akron – Valley Junction | Akron–Howard toward Valley Junction |
| Ira toward Cleveland | Cleveland – Akron – Valley Junction Until 1940s | Akron–Howard toward Valley Junction |
Location

Botzum is a Cuyahoga Valley Scenic Railroad train station in Cuyahoga Falls, Ohio, United States, with a street address in Akron, Ohio. It is located adjacent to the Cuyahoga River and Riverview Road in the Cuyahoga Valley National Park.

Initially a stop on the Valley Railway, trains began regular service at Botzum in 1880 — the station was a flag stop.
