= Canal Exploration Center station =

Train station in Independence, Ohio, US

Canal Exploration Center
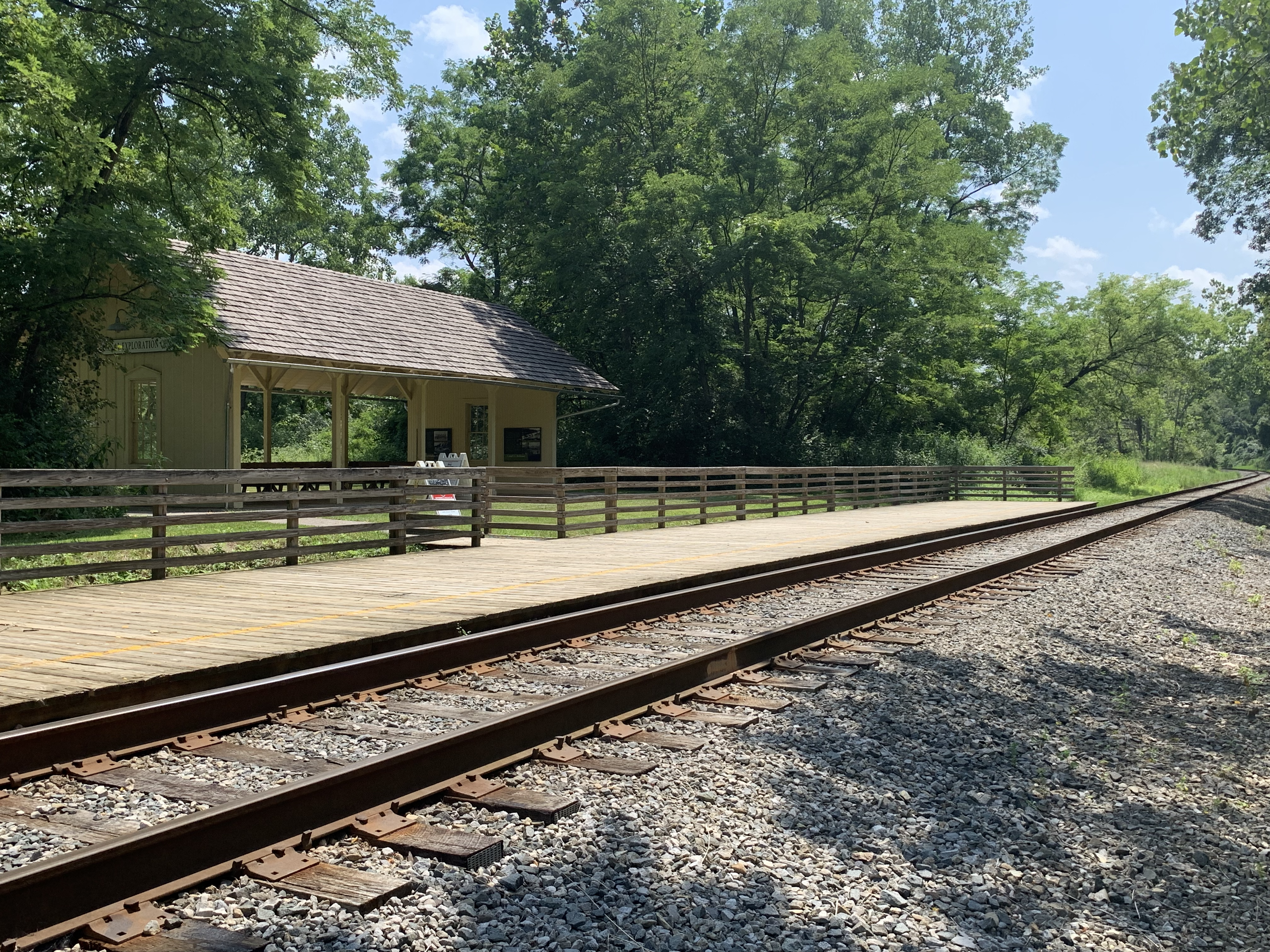

General information
- Location: 7104 Canal Road; Valley View, Ohio 44125
- Coordinates: 41.3732°N 81.6162°W
- Owner: Cuyahoga Valley Scenic Railroad
- Operator: Cuyahoga Valley Scenic Railroad
- Line: Valley Railway
- Platforms: 1 side platform
- Tracks: 1

Construction
- Parking: 103
- Accessible: yes

History
- Opened: c. 2000s
- Former names: Canal Visitor Center

Services
Preceding station	Cuyahoga Valley Scenic Railroad	Following station
Rockside Terminus	Explorer	Brecksville toward Akron Northside
Location

Canal Exploration Center is a Cuyahoga Valley Scenic Railroad train station in Independence, Ohio, with a street address in Valley View, Ohio. It is located near Hillside Road in the Cuyahoga Valley National Park. The station was constructed by the National Park Service in the early 2000s.

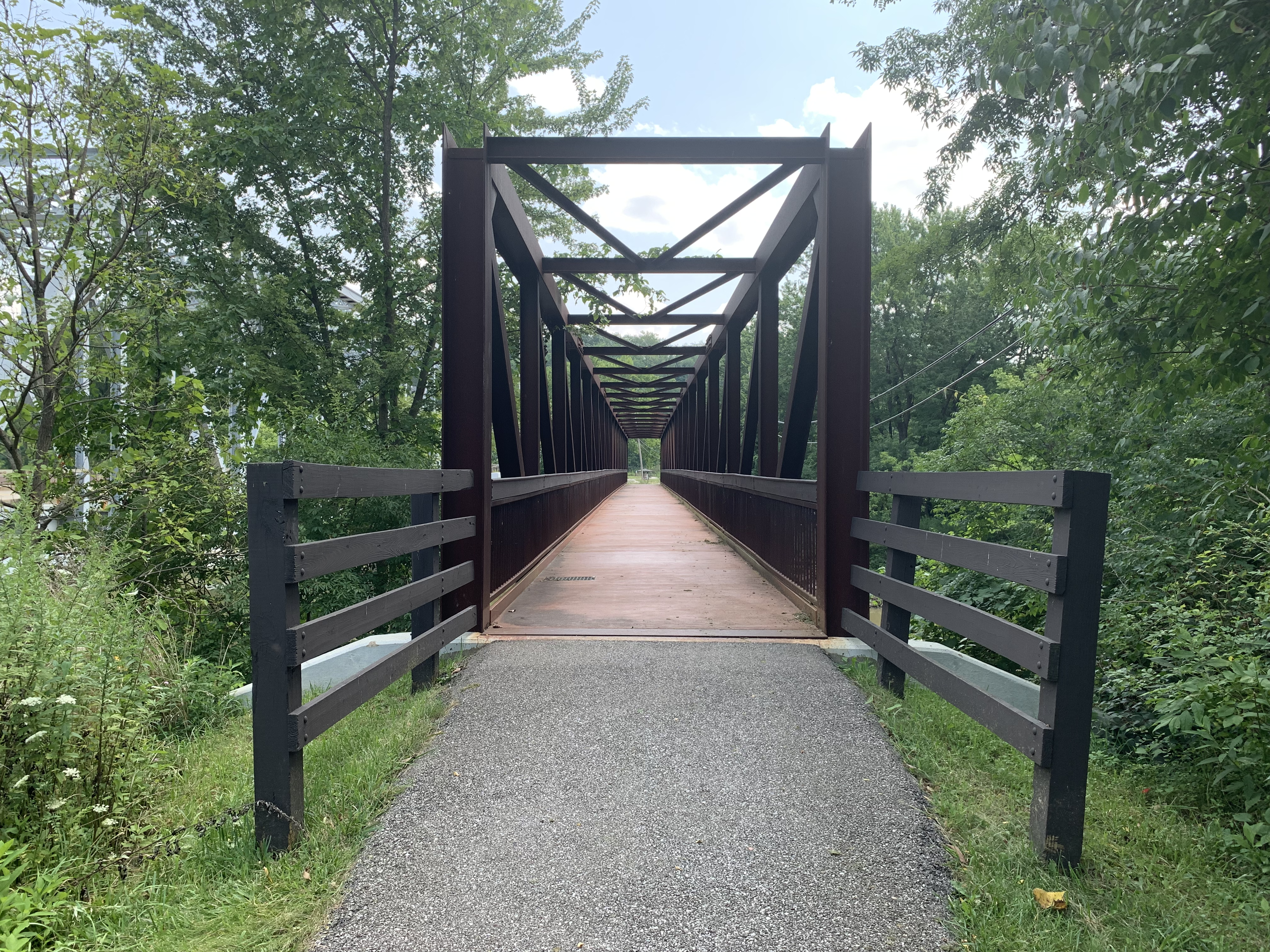
The station is only accessible via a bridge over the Cuyahoga River.

== Notable places nearby ==
- Canal Exploration Center
