= AquaSalina =

Salt de-icer

AquaSalina is a salt de-icer made from produced water (or brine) at Duck Creek Energy's vertical oil and gas wells. It is then filtered in Cleveland, Ohio and Mogadore, Ohio. The Ohio Department of Transportation approved AquaSalina in 2004, and it has been sold at Lowe's and elsewhere.

In the winter of 2017–2018, the Ohio Department of Transportation sprayed over 500,000 gallons of AquaSalina deicer on highways. In the 2018–2019 winter they applied over 620,000 gallons of it. In the winter of 2018–2019, they applied nearly 800,000 gallons.

In 2017, the Ohio Department of Natural Resources (ODNR) tested samples and found high radium levels, as has a Duquesne University scientist, who called it "a nightmare". While ODNR's tests indicated the results were 300 times higher than allowed in drinking water and above the levels allowed for the discharge of radioactive waste, it met their standards to be used as a deicer. Specifically, 0.005 picocuries per liter of radium is allowed for disposal, but there is no limit for spreading on roadways. The ODNR samples contained between 66 and 9602 picocuries per liter, including one sample that was higher than raw brine.

Several bills have been introduced in the Ohio legislatures from 2017 to 2019 to consider brine deicers a commodity, rather than toxic waste, to exempt them from ODNR testing.

== Fracking water lawsuit ==
Duck Creek Energy won a defamation lawsuit in 2013 against two individuals who said AquaSalina was "frac waste" or "fracking water". AquaSalina's source is vertical oil and gas wells, not fracking wells. They were allowed to continue describing it as "toxic". The ruling made a distinction stating AquaSalina "is" versus "contains" fracking water.

== See also ==
- Brine spreading in Ohio
