= Cuyahoga Valley Scenic Railroad =

Railroad in Ohio, US

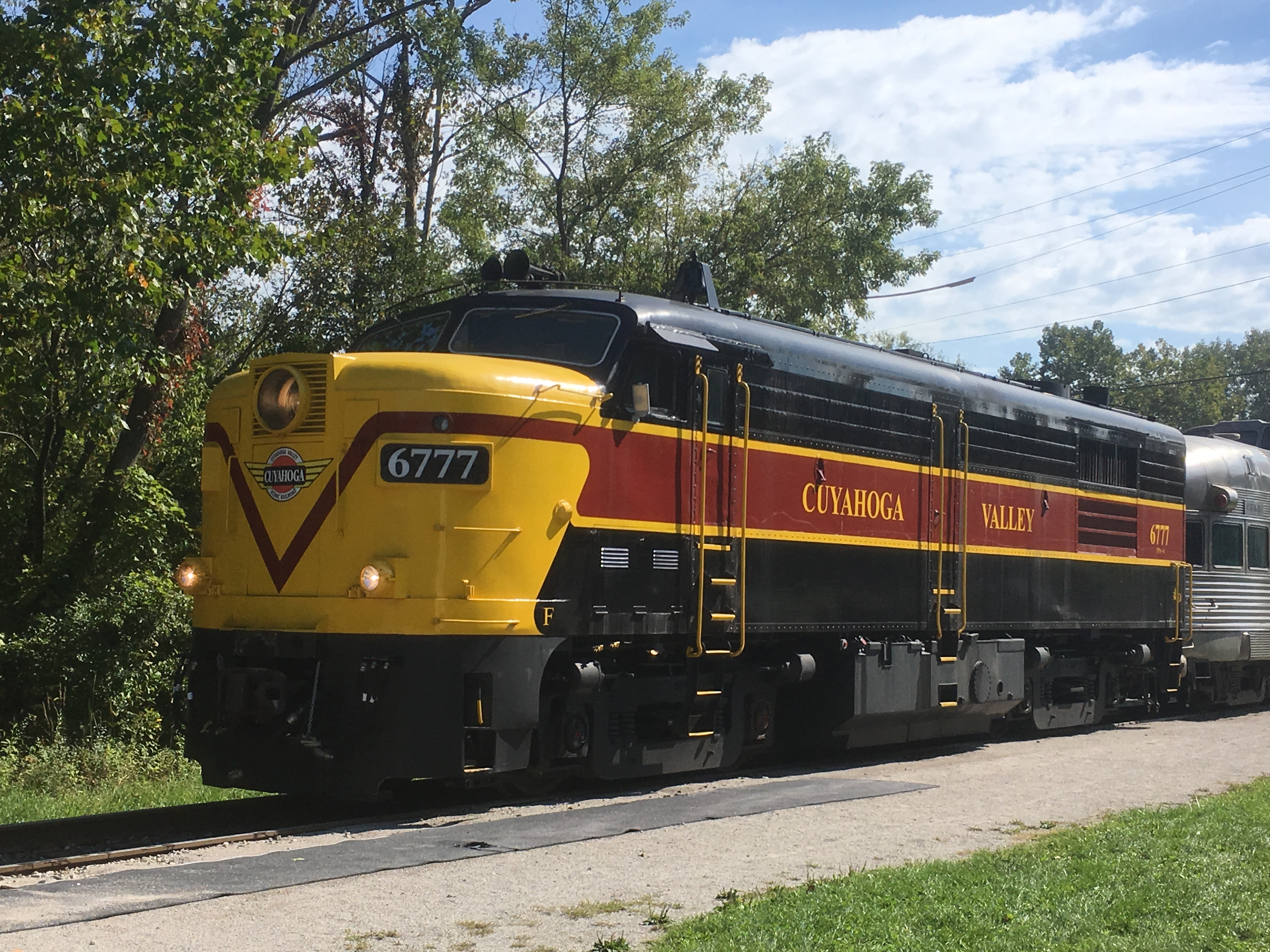

Overview
- Headquarters: 1664 Main Street/Route 303, Peninsula, Summit County, Ohio
- Reporting mark: CVSR
- Locale: Cuyahoga Valley National Park from Independence to Akron OH
- Dates of operation: 1975–present
- Predecessor: Chessie System

Technical
- Track gauge: 4 ft 8 1/2 in (1,435 mm) standard gauge
- Length: 26 miles (42 km) leased from National Park Service

Other
- Website: https://www.cvsr.org/

The Cuyahoga Valley Scenic Railroad (reporting mark CVSR) is a Class III railroad operating diesel-electric and steam-powered excursion trains between Akron, Ohio and the greater Cleveland area, through the scenic Cuyahoga Valley National Park.

== History ==
=== Formation ===
During the 1860s, as railroad construction across the United States was booming, citizens of the Cuyahoga Valley area expressed their desires for their own railroad. Plans were subsequently made for a rail line to be built through the area, but they were quickly dropped, due to a lack of financial support. The project was then resurrected by the financial support of David L. King, who owned various acres of property in the area.

On August 21, 1871, the Valley Railroad Company was incorporated, with the intention of running trains from Cleveland to Akron, Middlebury, and Canton, rivaling the nearby Ohio and Erie Canal. Construction of the railroad's right-of-way began, but following the Panic of 1873, a lack of funding halted the project again. In 1878, capitalists from Cleveland and New York chose to fund the project, on the condition that the railroad company increased its capital stock, and construction subsequently resumed.

=== Operations ===
The first passenger train on the Valley Railroad's new route ran on January 28, 1880, between Cleveland and Canton. Regular passenger and freight operations began five days later, on February 2. The Baltimore and Ohio Railroad (B&O) expressed interest in reaching Cleveland via the Valley Railroad's route, and in the fall of 1889, brokers from New York purchased the majority of the Valley Railroad's stock and turned them over to the B&O. The line between Cleveland and Akron was subsequently reorganized as the Cleveland, Terminal and Valley Railway; it later became known as the B&O's Valley Division. While the division was originally the route of various passenger trains that ran once a day, passenger operations gradually dwindled, until only one train remained—the Cleveland Night Express.

The Cleveland Night Express was discontinued by the 1960s, as competition from automobiles, trucks, and buses caused a major decline of both freight and passenger service on the division. The B&O's successor, the Chessie System, retained and upgraded the rails of the Valley Division to operate their daily ore trains between Cleveland and the steel mills in New Castle and Youngstown.

In the early 1970s, the Midwest Railway Historical Foundation expressed interest in using the railroad line between Cleveland and Akron for weekend tourist excursion operations, with Grand Trunk Western steam locomotive No. 4070 as the motive power. The foundation attracted support from Siegfried Buerling of Hale Farm, the Western Reserve Historical Society, and lawyer and Cleveland County Fair director Henry Lukes. A new organization—the Cuyahoga Valley Preservation and Scenic Railway Association—was formed in 1972. While the Chessie System was initially reluctant, the company's chairman, Cyrus Eaton, agreed to allow the foundation trackage rights for the division. The Cuyahoga Valley Line's inaugural train ran on June 28, 1975.

In 1985, the Chessie System's successor, CSX, obtained permission to abandon the right-of-way in favor of an alternate route that ran to Cleveland, and the Cuyahoga Valley Line consequently went through a hiatus without excursions for two ensuing years. In 1987, the National Park Service (NPS) purchased the Cleveland-Akron line for $2.5 million, intending to expand passenger train service on the line to attract visitors to the Cuyahoga Valley National Recreation Area. The Cuyahoga Valley Line resumed its excursion operations in 1988.

In 1994, the Cuyahoga Valley Line was reorganized as the Cuyahoga Valley Scenic Railroad (CVSR), and expanded operations while upgrading their equipment with new ALCO and MLW diesel locomotives and Budd steel passenger cars. In June 1999, construction was completed by the NPS on a new shop facility for the CVSR to use for locomotive maintenance.

The railroad adopted a strategic plan which recommended that it expand its operational capabilities. To do so, additional locomotives would need to be purchased. The plan specified that the CVSR seek to become "the largest collection of preserved Alco locomotives in the country." The railroad established a capital campaign, "Leading the Way Locomotive Fleet", to help it acquire the engines. By June 2024, it had raised $1.5 million toward its goal of $3 million.

On January 26, 2023, the Northeast Ohio Areawide Coordinating Agency and its partner agencies established plans to extend CVSR from its current northern terminus at Rockside Road in Independence, Ohio, all the way into Cleveland.

In late June 2024, the CVSR acquired an Alco FPA4 and an FPB4 from the Grand Canyon Railway, expanding its roster to five locomotives. The acquisition allows the railroad to operate two trains at once. It also allows for one locomotive to receive maintenance without impacting the operational schedule, which will enhance reliability. CVSR said it intended to purchase an additional FPA4 and FPB4 from the Grand Canyon Railway in the future.

On January 13, 2026, the CVSR announced their partnership with the Ohio Environmental Protection Agency to rebuild two of their FPA-4s into battery-electric units to reduce environmental emissions.

=== Accidents ===
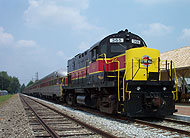
CVSR engine 365 sits at the Canton Lincoln Highway Station.

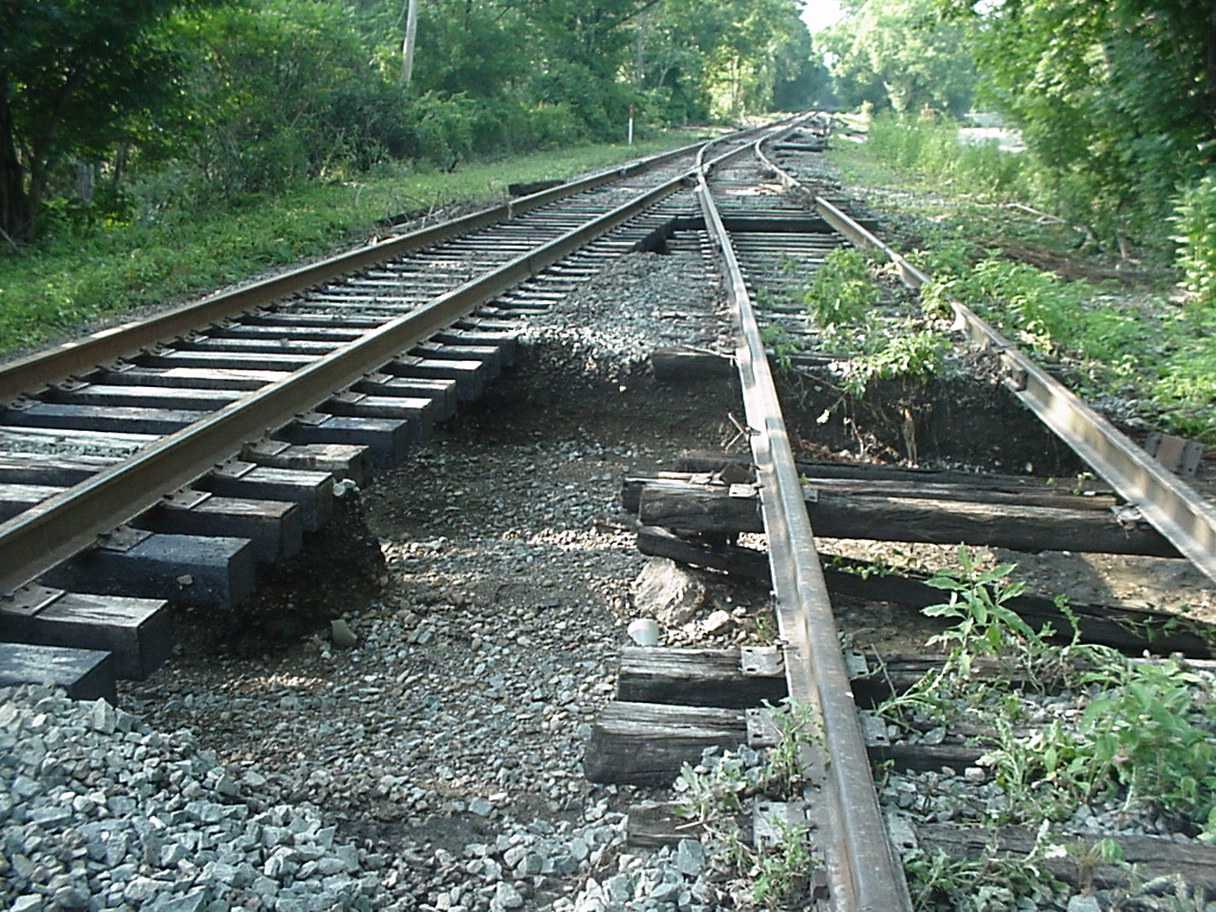
Flood damage to CVSR tracks north of Bath Road.

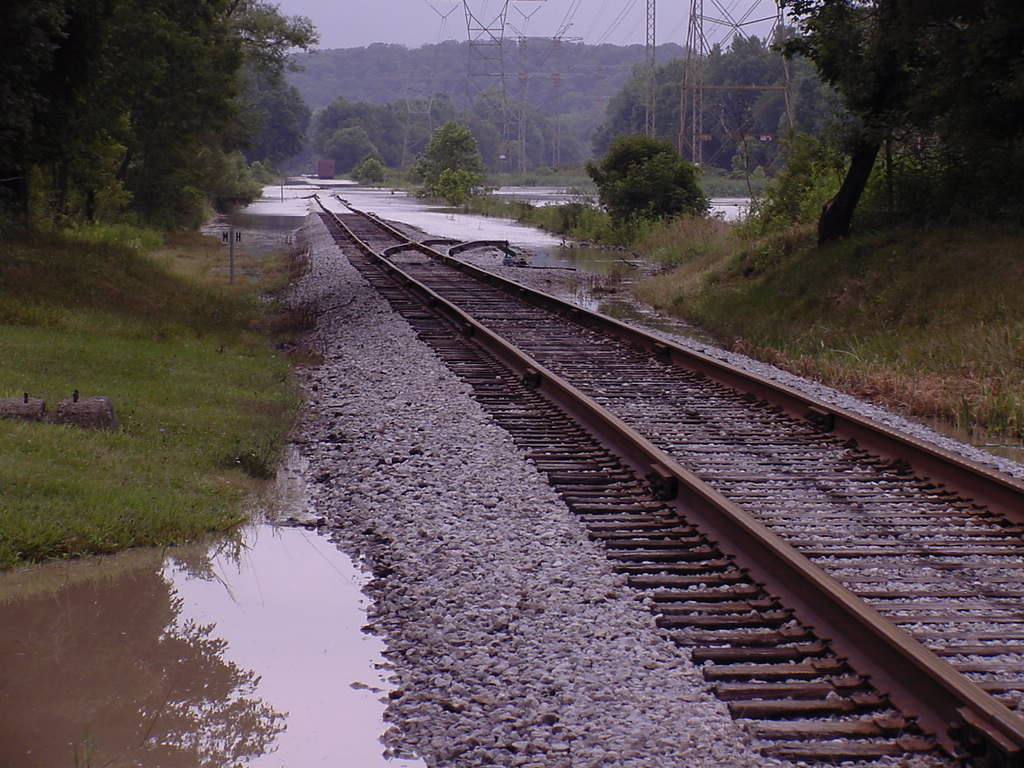
Cuyahoga River flooding CVSR tracks north of Vaughn Road.

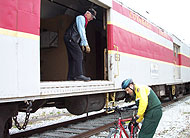
CVSR staff load and transport bikes with a Bike and Hike ticket.

The CVSR has had several accidents in recent history:

- A person died in 2004 after being hit by RS18U 1822 during a Polar Express excursion.
- In 2009, an automobile collided with a weekday train at a railroad crossing with passive warning signs (such as crossbucks). The driver of the car was not expecting the train as he thought it only ran at weekends.
- In 2012, a southbound CVSR train struck an eastbound car at the Portage St. crossing in northern Stark County. The elderly female driver was killed.
- In 2015 a pedestrian was killed by FPA-4 6780 (when it was still numbered 800) in a collision in Peninsula, Ohio.

== Operations ==
CVSR offers a variety of trips throughout the year. It operates excursion trains, and in a partnership with the NPS, the railroad helps visitors access various parts of the Cuyahoga Valley National Park. The CVSR also co-operates with Wheeling and Lake Erie Railway (WLE) to operate on trackage south to Canton.

=== National Park Scenic ===
National Park Scenic excursions allow passengers to ride throughout the entire route as well as get on and off at various stations along the way.

=== Steam in the Valley ===
Grand Trunk Western 4070, a steam locomotive, was originally the primary motive power of the CVSR, but since 1990, the locomotive has been out of service. During select operating years in the 21st century, the CVSR hosted steam excursion trains pulled by visiting steam locomotives, including Canadian Pacific 1293, Viscose Company 6, and Nickel Plate Road 765.

=== Explorer ===
For a small fee, a bicyclist may ride the train one way from any one of CVSR's nine stations. The bike is loaded onto a re-purposed baggage car and bikers are seated in a car directly following it. Similar programs are in place for hikers, runners and passengers with kayaks for a slightly different price. The Explorer program (previously known as Bike Aboard) is only offered from May through October.

=== Train to Canton ===
In summer 2003, CVSR began service between Akron and Canton. CVSR provided service between Akron Northside Station and Canton Lincoln Highway Station until 2013.

== Stations ==
Stations	Address	Elevation	Nearby Points of Interest	Image
Rockside	7900 Old Rockside Road, Independence, Ohio 44131	598 feet (182 m)	GCRTA Routes 54 (Rockside Rd) and 77 (Brecksville Rd) bus connection; Eleven Mile Lock 39; Thornburg Station (food)	
Canal Exploration Center	Canal Road & Hillside Road, Valley View, Ohio 44125	611 feet (186 m)	Canal Visitor Center, Twelve Mile Lock 38	
Brecksville	13512 Station Road, Brecksville, Ohio 44141	635 feet (194 m)	Station Road Bridge; Pinery Dam & Feeder, and Lock 36; Whiskey Lock 35	
Boston Mill	7100 Riverview Road, Peninsula, Ohio 44264	663 feet (202 m)	Boston Store Visitor Center, Boston Lock 32, Lonesome Lock 31, Wallace Lock 33, Boston Mills Ski Resort, food	
Peninsula Depot	1630 West Mill Street, Peninsula, Ohio 44264	693 feet (211 m)	Peninsula Visitor Center, Peninsula Lock 29, Peninsula Feeder Lock 30, Deep Lock 28 and Quarry, food	
Indigo Lake	Riverview Road, Peninsula, Ohio 44264	739 feet (225 m)	Hunt Farm Visitor Center, Beaver Marsh, Pancake Lock 26, Johnny Cake Lock 27	
Howe Meadow stop	4040 Riverview Road, Peninsula, Ohio 44264	741 feet (226 m)	Hunt Farm Visitor Center, Everett Road Covered Bridge	
Botzum	2912 Riverview Road, Akron, Ohio 44313	754 feet (230 m)	Niles Lock 24, Mudcatcher Lock 25 (Station located in Cuyahoga Falls, Ohio)	
Big Bend	1337 Merriman Road, Akron, Ohio 44313	782 feet (238 m)		
Akron Northside	27 Ridge Street, Akron, Ohio 44308	885 feet (270 m)	Mustill Store, Quaker Square, National Inventors Hall of Fame a.k.a. Inventure Place	
Canton Lincoln Highway	1315 Tuscarawas Street West, Canton, Ohio 44702	1,029 feet (314 m)	McKinley Memorial Mausoleum, Canton Museum of Art, First Ladies National Historic Site	

== Equipment ==
=== Locomotives ===
Cuyahoga Valley Scenic Railroad - Locomotives
Manufacturer	Model	Description	Road Numbers	Notes	Image
ALCO American Locomotive Company	Alco C420	Road/Switcher	365	In Service.	
Budd Company	RDC-1	Rail Diesel Car	M-3, 9801, 9802	All Out of Service	
Budd Company	RDC-9	Rail Diesel Car	6003	Out of Service.	
MLW Montreal Locomotive Works	MLW FPA-4	Passenger	6771, 6773, 6777, 6780 (B&O Livery; formerly numbered 800)	6773 In Service, 6777 Out of Service. 6771 and 6780 being converted to battery power in Illinois. 6773 is former Grand Canyon Railway.	
MLW Montreal Locomotive Works	MLW FPB-4	Passenger	6871	Former Grand Canyon Railway; Out of Service	

==== Leased Locomotives ====
Cuyahoga Valley Scenic Railroad - Leased/Visiting Locomotives
Manufacturer	Model	Description	Road Numbers	Notes
Electro-Motive Diesel	EMD GP15-1	Road/Switcher	LTEX 1419, LTEX 1443	On lease from Larry's Truck & Electric. Both out of Service. Ex-CR 1642, CR 1681.
Electro-Motive Diesel	EMD SD40-2	Road/Switcher	HZRX 3371, HZRX 8099	On lease from Horizon Rail. Both In Service. Ex-BN 7282, BN 8099.

==== Former Locomotives ====
Cuyahoga Valley Scenic Railroad - Retired Locomotives
Manufacturer	Model	Description	Road Numbers	Notes	Image
MLW Montreal Locomotive Works	MLW FPA-4	Passenger	6767	Used as parts, cab roof cut off in February 2021 for use in restoration of ATSF 59L	
Budd Company	RDC-1	Passenger	6146	Scrapped for Parts. Ex Boston and Maine	
MLW Montreal Locomotive Works	ALCO S-3	Switcher	8485	Donated in August 1990, arrived in February 1991. Never ran and Scrapped in August/September 1996.	
ALCO American Locomotive Company	RS-3	Road/Switcher	4056, 4088, 4099 and NYSW 104	4099 sold to Age of Steam Roundhouse in 2011, 4056, 4088 and NYSW 104 cannibalized for parts	
ALCO American Locomotive Company	RSD-5	Passenger	1689	Sold to Illinois Railway Museum	
MLW Montreal Locomotive Works	MLW RS-18	Road/Switcher	182 and 1822	182 was A RS-18 and 1822 was A RS-18U, Both sold to LTEX in 2024	
MLW Montreal Locomotive Works	MLW C424	Road/Switcher	4241	Sold to LTEX in 2024	
Electro-Motive Diesel	EMD SW8	Switcher	2014	Ex US Army, acquired in 1995. Sold to LTEX in 2008, scrapped around 2011/2012.	
Electro-Motive Diesel	EMD GP30	Road/Switcher	2572	Only for the 1992 Season. Later sold to the CERA and then to the CIND, scrapped in 2003.	
General Electric	GE 44-ton	Switcher	21	Ex USAF, acquired in 1993. Sold to the Kentucky Railway Museum in April 2009.	

==== Former Leased Locomotives ====
Cuyahoga Valley Scenic Railroad - Leased/Visiting Locomotives
Manufacturer	Model	Description	Road Numbers	Notes	Image
Electro-Motive Diesel	EMD FL9	Passenger	FLNX 484	Leased from Flint Railway Supply from Late 2009 to Early 2012. Sold to Orford Express in Magog, QC and is currently stored there after the operation shut down in 2020. Ex-ME 484/AMTK 484/AMTK 491/AMTK 242/PC 5029/NH 2029	
Electro-Motive Diesel	EMD F40PH	Passenger	OHCR 452, OHCR 460	Leased from Jerry Joe Jacobson from Late 2009 to Late 2011. Currently stored at the Age of Steam Roundhouse in Sugarcreek, OH.	
Electro-Motive Diesel	EMD GP15-1	Road/Switcher	LTEX 1420	Leased from Larry's Truck & Electric from 2011 to 2015. Now at LTEX in Lordstown, OH. Ex-CR 1643.	
Electro-Motive Diesel	EMD GP30u	Road/Switcher	LTEX 2436	Leased from Larry's Truck & Electric from Late 2012 to Early 2014. Now at LTEX in Lordstown, OH. Ex-ATSF 2736/BNSF 2436.	
Electro-Motive Diesel	EMD GP35	Road/Switcher	LTEX 355	Leased from Larry's Truck & Electric from Late 2012 to Early 2014. Only made 1 Revenue run on CVSR. Returned to LTEX then sold to Brookville in Early 2018, rebuilt into a GP35R and sold to the Metro-North Railroad (MTA) in December 2018 and became MTA 108. Ex-US Sugar 355/LTEX 2556/WC 2556/WC 831/FRVR 831/CNW 831.	
Electro-Motive Diesel	EMD GP10	Road/Switcher	HZRX 8420	Leased from Horizon Rail from Mid 2015 to 2017. On Long Term Lease to The Grand River Railway in Fairport Harbor, OH. Ex SLSF 623/ICG 7720/NCYR 8420	
Electro-Motive Diesel	EMD GP30	Road Slug	HZRX 2328	Leased from Horizon Rail from Late 2020 to Early 2022 and in Late 2022. On Lease to the Henderson Overton Branch RR in Texas. Ex CSX 2328/SBD 1360/L&N 1029	
Electro-Motive Diesel	EMD GP35M	Road/Switcher	HZRX 2348	Leased from Horizon Rail from Late 2019 to Late 2022. On Long Term Lease unknown plant in West Virginia. Ex CBG 2348/CR 2348/PC 2348/PRR 2348	
Electro-Motive Diesel	EMD GP40	Road/Switcher	HZRX 3134	Leased from Horizon Rail from Mid 2016 to Early 2017. Sold to The Austin Steam Train Association as A&TC 3118 in late 2024. Ex-PC-CR 3118/DRGW-SCRX-SW 3134.	
Electro-Motive Diesel	EMD GP40-2	Road/Switcher	HZRX 6421	Leased from Horizon Rail from Late 2020 to Early 2022 and in Late 2022. On Lease to the Henderson Overton Branch RR in Texas. Ex CSX 6421/CSX 6182/C&O 4283	
Electro-Motive Diesel	EMD SD50	Road/Switcher	HZRX 5003	Rebuilt into a SD40E by Horizon Rail. Leased from Horizon Rail from September to December 2025. On Long Term Lease to Rocky Mountaineer as of 2026. Ex-CR 6820/NS 5468/HBRY-NREX 5003.	
Electro-Motive Diesel	EMD MP15DC	Switcher	HZRX 1295	Leased from Horizon Rail from September 2025 to August 2026. On lease to a trash plant as of September 2026. Ex-UPY/NREX 1295.	

=== Cars ===
Cuyahoga Valley Scenic Railroad - Cars
Number	Name	Type	Heritage	Notes	Image
1	St. Lucie Sound	Observation/bar/sleeping/lounge car	ex-Florida East Coast Railway	Acquired 1995 and Out of Service.	
89	"Lone Star"	Concession / Dining car	ex-Baltimore and Ohio	Acquired 1993 and Sold to AMC Rail in 2019.	
105		Coach/ADA car	ex-Boston and Maine Railroad/Virginia Railway Express	Demotorized Budd Rail Diesel Car (Boise Budd). Acquired 2008, In Service and used for handicapped accessibility.	
110–115		Lightweight coaches	ex-Cedar Rapids and Iowa City Railway, New Jersey Transit Rail Operations, Penn Central Transportation Company, Atchison, Topeka and Santa Fe Railway	Built 1939 Budd Company. Acquired 1994, 110 "Mary S. & David C. Corbin" Sold to Great Smoky Mountains Railroad in ??? Year, 111 & 112 "General John Stark" Out of service, 113 & 115 sold in 2005 to Oklahoma Railway Museum and 114 "Barrlet Salon" sold in 2006 to a defunct restaurant in Fennville Michigan.	
161	Steven W. Wait	Dining car	ex-MARC Train, Pennsylvania Railroad	Converted to dining car in early 2019 and in service.	
8283	Sharon Inn	Edu-trainment car	ex-MARC Train, Pennsylvania Railroad	Converted to educational car for kids in 2019-2020 and In Service. Re-lettered and re-numbered in 2020.	
8244	Beaver Falls Inn	Coach	ex-MARC Train, Pennsylvania Railroad	Out of Service but Ready if the need Arises and re-lettered and renumbered in 2022.	
164	R.T. Green Family	Coach	ex-MARC Train, Pennsylvania Railroad	In Service	
165	George Washington Cooper	Coach	ex-MARC Train, Pennsylvania Railroad	Renamed in 2018 and In Service.	
8260	Greensburg Inn	Coach	ex-MARC Train, Pennsylvania Railroad	Preserved in honor of Ruth Renner Percy, re-lettered and re-numbered in 2020 and in service.	
167	Simon Perkins	Coach	ex-MARC Train, Pennsylvania Railroad	Out of Service but Ready if the need Arises.	
8243	Ashtabula Inn	Coach	ex-MARC Train, Pennsylvania Railroad	Preserved by the Clarence Reinberger Foundation, re-lettered and re-numbered in 2020 and in service.	
169	"Culver Inn"	Coach	ex-MARC Train, Pennsylvania Railroad	In Service	
357		Head end power car	ex-US Army	Acquired 2018 and in service.	
377/CZ-10	Silver Solarium	Dome/Observation car	ex-Chicago, Burlington and Quincy Railroad	Built 1948. Acquired 2018 and Out of Service.	
450	Silver Peak	Baggage car	ex-Chicago, Burlington and Quincy	Built 1940 by Budd and In Service.	
688		Head end power car	ex-Amtrak, US Army	Rebuilt by Amtrak in the 1970s from a 1951 troop sleeper and Out of Service but Ready if the need Arises.	
727	Fort Mitchell	Combine car/ADA car	ex-Central of Georgia Railway	Acquired 1995 and sold in 2021 to The Southern Appalachia Railway Museum.	
1105	Silver Bronco	Dome car	ex-Rio Grande Zephyr, Denver & Rio Grande Western Railroad	Acquired 2011 and In Service.	
1129		Baggage car	Northern Pacific	Built 1947. Acquired 2009. Upgraded for Bike Aboard program and In Service.	
2914	A.A. Augustus	Coach	ex-New York Central Railroad	Built 1948 by Budd Company. Converted to dining car in 2018 and Out of Service.	
3126	Cuyahoga Inn	Dining car	ex-Amtrak, Pennsylvania Railroad	Built by Budd in 1949. Acquired 2006 and Out of Service.	
3450	Knight Foundation	Baggage car	ex-Atchison, Topeka and Santa Fe Railway	Built 1940s Budd Company. Out of Service but Ready if the need Arises.	
4718	Silver Lariat	Dome car	ex-Burlington Northern Railway	Built 1948 by Budd. Acquired 2018 and In Service.	
6217	"Nancy S. Labuda"	Coach	ex-Seaboard Coast Line Railroad	Built 1947 by Budd Company. Acquired 1996. Renovated as a premium coach in 2019 and In Service.	
8449	Silver Rapids	10-6 Sleeper car	ex-Pennsylvania Railroad	Built 1948 by Budd. Acquired 2018 and Out of Service because of mold.	
2989		Cafe car	ex-Amtrak, Southern Pacific Transportation Company	Built 1950. Used on the Auto Train. Acquired 2002, re-numbered in 2021 and In Service.	
8704	Furnace Run	Cafe car	ex-Amtrak, Chicago, Burlington and Quincy Railroad	Acquired 2007 and Out of Service.	
79896		Caboose	ex-Adirondack Scenic Railroad, Canadian National	Built 1977. Acquired 2016 and In Occasional Service.	
8266	Latrobe Inn	Coach	ex-MARC Train, Pennsylvania Railroad	Built 1949 by Budd. Acquired 2013 and in service.	
801	Silver Salon	Lounge/ADA Car	ex-Chicago, Burlington and Quincy Railroad	Built 1947 by Budd. Owned and operated by the Indiana Transportation Museum from 1983 to 2018, sold to private owner. Resold to East Tennessee Rail Services Inc. In May 2021. Acquired 2021 and Out of Service.	

== Management ==
As of 2024, the railroad's management consists of:

- Larry Stevenson, President/CEO
- James Lawson, Chief of Railroad Operations
- Greg Domzalski, Director of Finance
- Lynee Bixler, Director of Marketing
- Samantha Holland, Director of Events
- Michele Savoldi, Director of Development and Community Relations
- Joel Turenne, Director of Equipment and Facilities

== See also ==
- ABC Railway
- ALCO RSD-5
- Heritage railway
- Cleveland railroad history
- List of crossings of the Cuyahoga River
- List of heritage railroads in the United States
- List of Ohio railroads
- List of Ohio train stations
- Ohio and Erie Canal

== Notes ==
A: Elevation or Altitude approximations obtained through Wiki ToolServer GeoHack link to United States Geological Survey National Elevation Dataset:
Where "-Longitude" is the degrees in decimal with the "W" suffix replaced by a "-" prefix
"Latitude" is the degrees in decimal without the "N" suffix.
B: "Nearby" means within a mile walk or so, one-way.

== Bibliography ==
- Johnson, Ronald (July 1980). "The Cuyahoga Valley Line". Railfan & Railroad. Carstens Publications. pp. 49–52.
- Perri, Mark (June 2001). "An update from along the Crooked River". Railpace. Vol. 20, no. 6. Railpace Company, Inc. pp. 27–30.
