= Peninsula Depot =

Peninsula
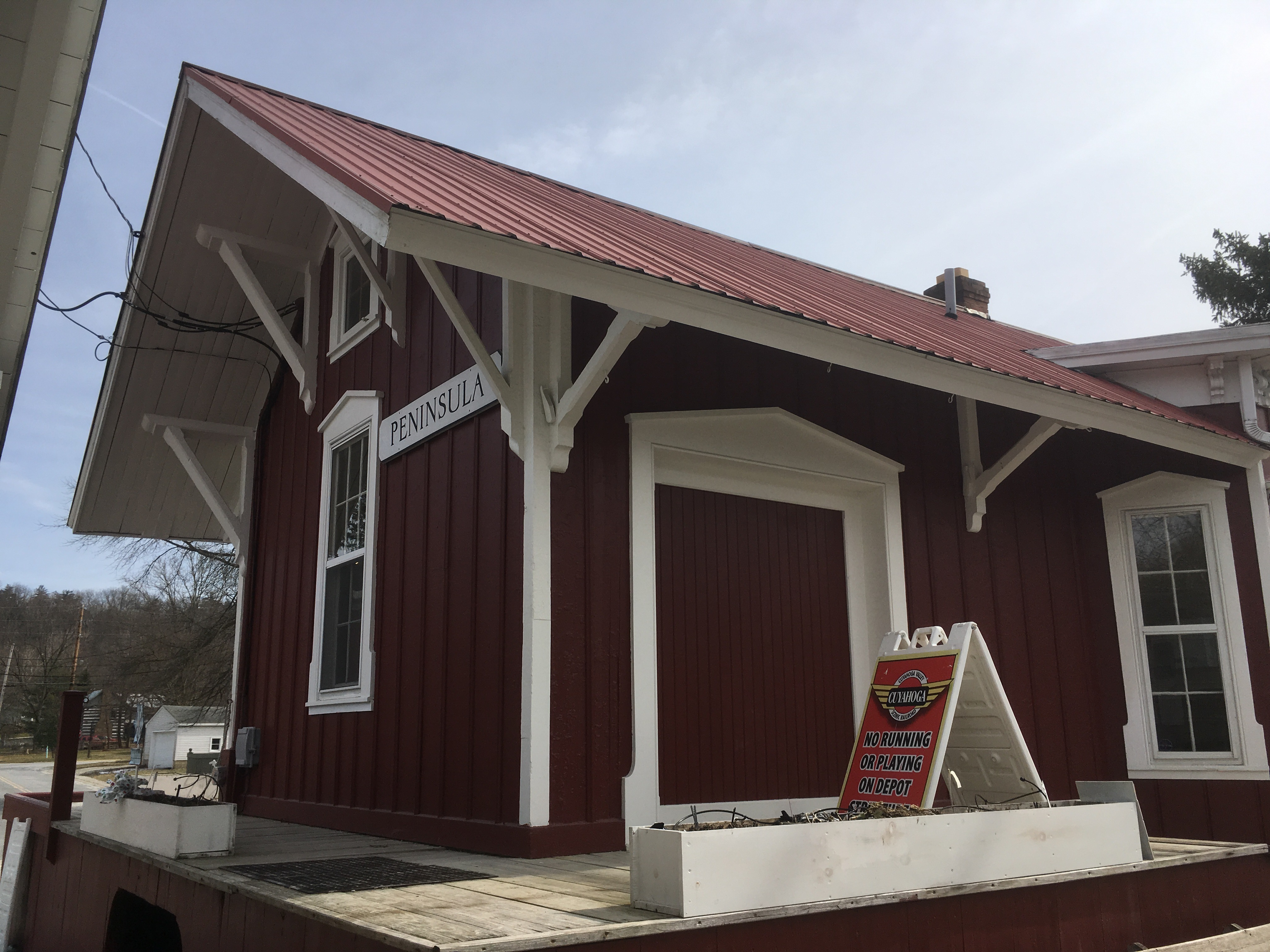

General information
- Location: 1630 Mill Street; Peninsula, Ohio 44264
- Coordinates: 41.2423°N 81.5490°W
- Owner: Cuyahoga Valley Scenic Railroad
- Operator: Cuyahoga Valley Scenic Railroad
- Line: Valley Railway
- Platforms: 1 side platform
- Tracks: 1

Construction
- Parking: 40+
- Accessible: yes

History
- Opened: 1880
- Rebuilt: 1968

Services
Preceding station	Cuyahoga Valley Scenic Railroad	Following station
Rockside Terminus	National Park Scenic	Akron Northside Terminus
Boston Mill toward Rockside	Explorer	Indigo Lake toward Akron Northside
Former services
Preceding station	Baltimore and Ohio Railroad	Following station
Cleveland Terminus	Cleveland – Akron – Wheeling 1940s–1962	Akron–Howard toward Wheeling
Jaite toward Cleveland	Cleveland – Akron – Wheeling 1940s–1962	Ira toward Wheeling
Boston Mill toward Cleveland	Cleveland – Akron – Valley Junction Until 1940s	Botzum toward Valley Junction
Boston Mill toward Cleveland	Cleveland – Akron – Valley Junction Until 1940s	Everett toward Valley Junction
Location

Peninsula Depot is a Cuyahoga Valley Scenic Railroad train station in Peninsula, Ohio. It is located adjacent to Mill Road near Streetsboro Road (Ohio State Route 303) in the Cuyahoga Valley National Park.

== History ==
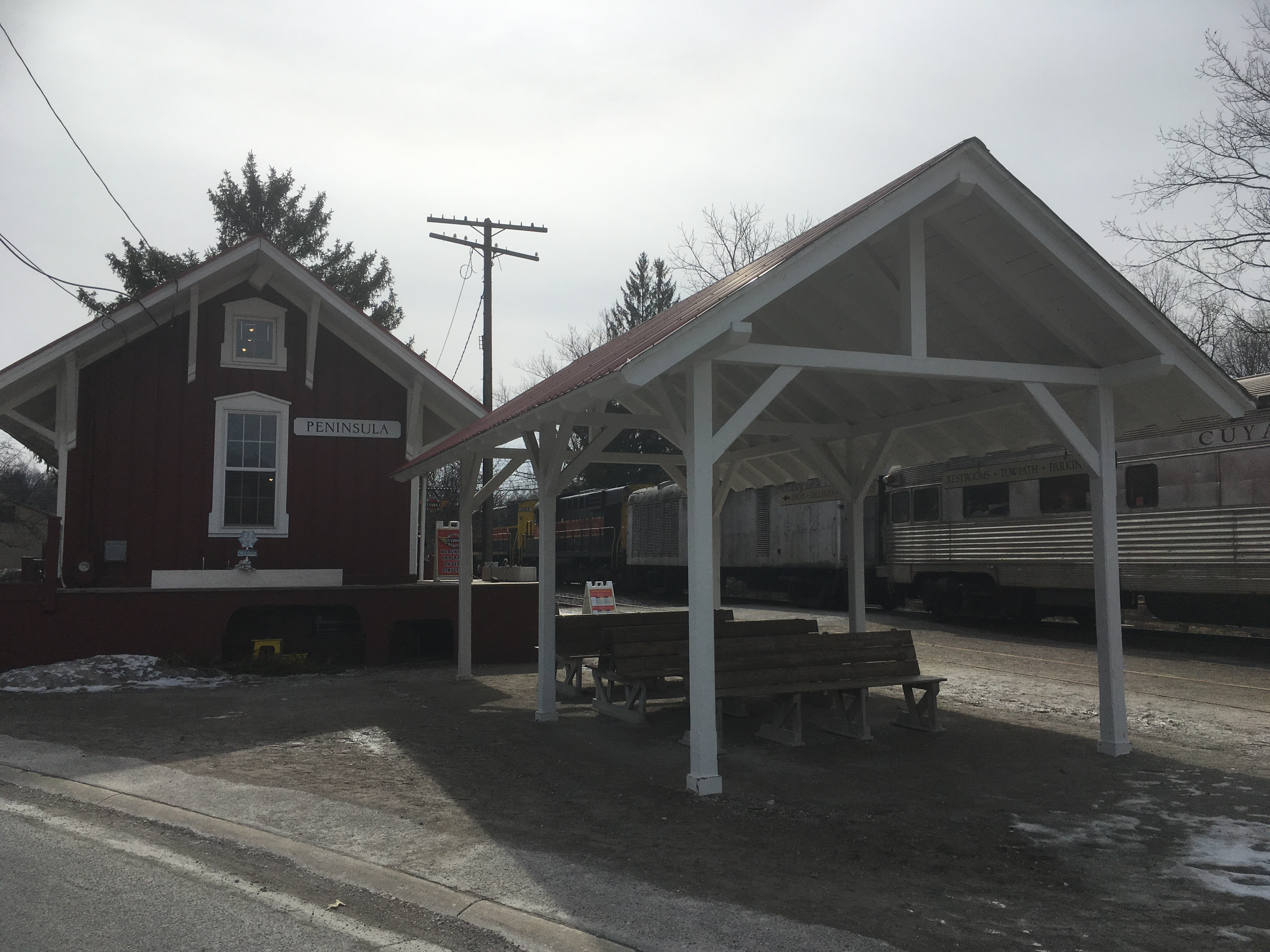

Initially a stop on the Valley Railway, trains began regular service at Peninsula in 1880. The original station building was destroyed in a fire in the 1960s. It was replaced with the depot formerly located in the village of Boston, which was moved to Peninsula in 1968. The building may be the only surviving combination station from the Valley Railway.
