= Brecksville Reservation =

Largest urban park in Ohio, United States

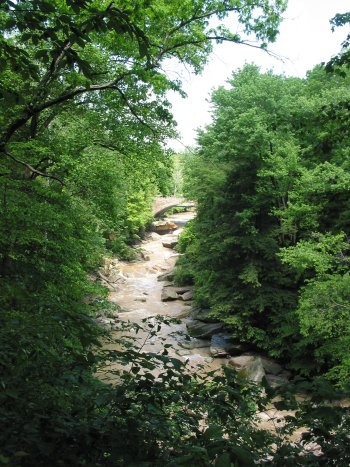
- Interactive map of Brecksville Reservation
- Type: Urban park
- Location: Brecksville, Ohio
- Coordinates: 41.311°N 81.609°W
- Area: 3,026 acres (1,225 ha)
- Created: 1930
- Operator: Cleveland Metroparks

Brecksville Reservation is the largest urban park in the U.S. state of Ohio. Chippewa Creek flows through the 3,026-acre (1,225 ha) reservation, which is home to a section of the Buckeye Trail. Brecksville Reservation adjoins Cuyahoga Valley National Park. The park supports a diverse set of ecosystems, featuring fields, a river plain, gorges, and a variety of forested areas.
