= Botzum, Ohio =

Botzum
- Hamlet
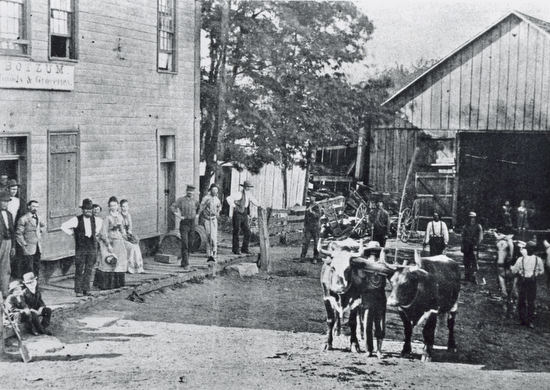
- John Botzum General Store, 1875

- Location within the state of Ohio
- Coordinates: 41°09′43″N 81°34′30″W
- Country: United States
- State: Ohio
- County: Summit
- Elevation: 748 ft (228 m)
- Time zone: UTC-5 (Eastern (EST))
  - Summer (DST): UTC-4 (EDT)
- GNIS feature ID: 1062404

Botzum was a hamlet in Northampton Township, Summit County, Ohio, United States, around what is now the intersection of Bath and Riverview Roads in Akron and Cuyahoga Falls.

== History ==
Botzum began as a community along the Ohio and Erie Canal where the canal spread out to form the Yellow Creek Basin near Yellow Creek. This was thought to be a good place for business. There were two warehouses, a store, and a hotel there in 1827, set up by Nathaniel Hardy.

Botzum was platted in 1836 on 100 acres (0.4 km^{2}) as Niles by Peter Voris and some of his associates. The village was never actually built, though, due to the Panic of 1837. Eventually the lots were sold off, one of them to George Botzum. In 1866 the Buckeye post office opened up. In spite of this name, though, the railroad depot in town was called Botzum. The name of the post office was also changed to Botzum in 1893 to match the name of the depot.

In the 1920s the city of Akron purchased 800 acres (3.2 km^{2}) of land at Botzum to build a sewage treatment plant, which opened in 1928 and remains there to this day. There is no longer any sign that there was a community there. Along with the sewage plant it is known for a viewing station for great blue herons to the east where Bath Road crosses the Cuyahoga River. There is also a sign on the Ohio and Erie Canal Towpath with a photograph of Botzum from 1875.

== See also ==
- Botzum station
