= Duck Creek Energy =

Duck Creek Energy and Nature's Own Source are deicer and oil industry companies in Brecksville, Ohio owned by David Mansberry.

== AquaSalina ==
Nature's Own Source produces AquaSalina, a salt deicer made from produced water (or brine) at Duck Creek's vertical oil and gas wells. The company has called this wastewater "ancient seawater". It is then filtered in Cleveland, Ohio and Mogadore, Ohio.

=== Fracking water lawsuit ===
Duck Creek Energy won a defamation lawsuit in 2013 against two individuals who said AquaSalina was "frac waste" or "fracking water". AquaSalina's source is vertical oil and gas wells, not fracking wells. They were allowed to continue describing it as "toxic". The ruling made a distinction stating AquaSalina "is" versus "contains" fracking water.
