= Joshua Stacher =

American political scientist and scholar

Joshua A. Stacher (born 1975) is an American political scientist and scholar of Middle East politics, authoritarianism, and social movements.

== Background and education ==
Joshua Stacher received his undergraduate degree at Washington and Jefferson College in 1998, having majored in History and English. He subsequently studied comparative politics and Middle Eastern Islamist movements at The American University in Cairo, there receiving his master's in Political Science in 2002.

In 2007 Stacher received his doctorate from the University of St. Andrews School of International Relations. His thesis was entitled “Adapting Authoritarianism: Institutions and Co-optation in Egypt and Syria”. He subsequently served as Post-Doctoral Fellow at the Maxwell School of Citizenship and Public Affairs, in Syracuse New York. In 2008 Stacher became Associate Professor of Political Science at Kent State University, Ohio.

Stacher speaks Arabic (Modern Standard, as well as Egyptian and Syrian dialects) at the advanced to fluent level.

== Published research ==
Stacher's peer-reviewed literature focuses on Egyptian politics and the relationship between authoritarianism, opposition parties and social movements, and political culture. Stacher has taken issue with the idea that deep-seated cultural or historical factors give Egyptians an inherently anti-democratic political culture. Instead he has attempted to show that Egypt's political culture is characterized by public apathy caused by the authoritarian nature of the state. Stacher has illustrated various ways in with the Egyptian government has acted to repress or frustrate opposition parties in order to retain power, while nominally allowing electoral choice.

Stacher's books include:

- Adaptable Autocrats: Regime Power in Egypt and Syria (2012)
- Watermelon Democracy: Egypt’s Turbulent Transition (2020)

== Public views ==
=== The Arabist ===
In 2005 Stacher was a frequent contributor to the Middle Eastern politics blog The Arabist, publishing over a hundred articles.

=== Muslim Brotherhood ===
In March 2007 Stacher, along with Professor Samer Shehata, wrote an op-ed that was published in The Boston Globe entitled "Hear out the Muslim Brotherhood" which criticized the United States government for refusing to deal with the organization. They argued that the group was "the most popular and organized political movement in Egypt" and that it had "demonstrated a commitment to working peacefully ... despite years of repression". As the oldest and most important Islamist group in the Middle East, an engagement with the Brotherhood would demonstrate a willingness on the part of the United States to talk to moderate Islamist groups, and signify a genuine commitment to "promoting democracy - not just to supporting those who are friendly to U.S. interests".
