= Rockside station =

Rockside
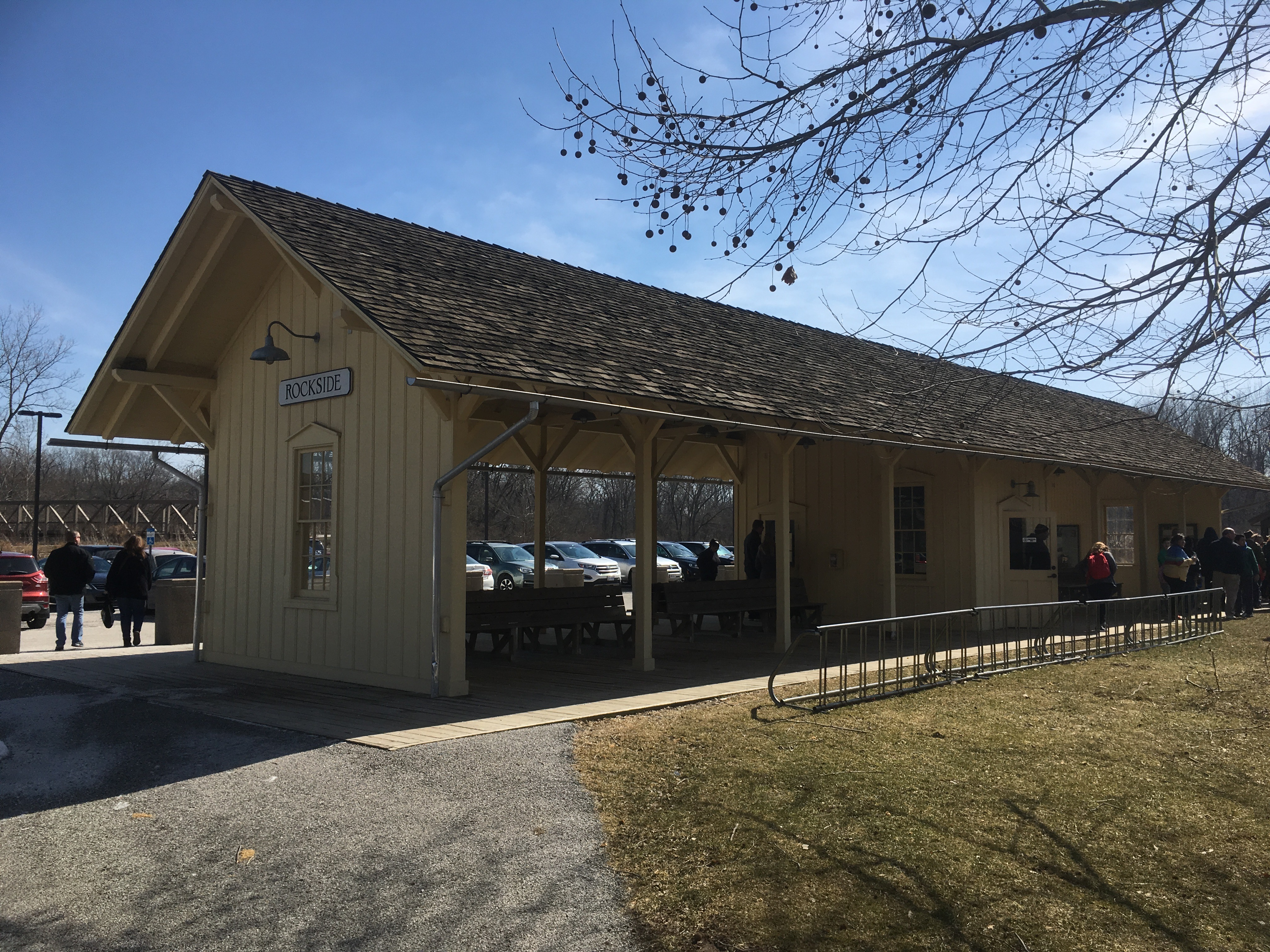

General information
- Location: 7900 Old Rockside Road; Independence, Ohio 44131
- Coordinates: 41.3927°N 81.6308°W
- Owner: Cuyahoga Valley Scenic Railroad
- Operator: Cuyahoga Valley Scenic Railroad
- Line: Valley Railway
- Platforms: 1 side platform
- Tracks: 1
- Connections: 51C 77F

Construction
- Parking: 120+
- Accessible: yes

History
- Opened: c. 2000s

Services
Preceding station	Cuyahoga Valley Scenic Railroad	Following station
Terminus	National Park Scenic	Peninsula toward Akron Northside
Terminus	Explorer	Canal Exploration Center toward Akron Northside
Location

Rockside is a Cuyahoga Valley Scenic Railroad train station in Independence, Ohio. It is located on the south side of Rockside Road in Cuyahoga Valley National Park. The station was constructed by the National Park Service in the early 2000s.
