= Akron Northside station =

Railway station in Akron, Ohio

Akron Northside
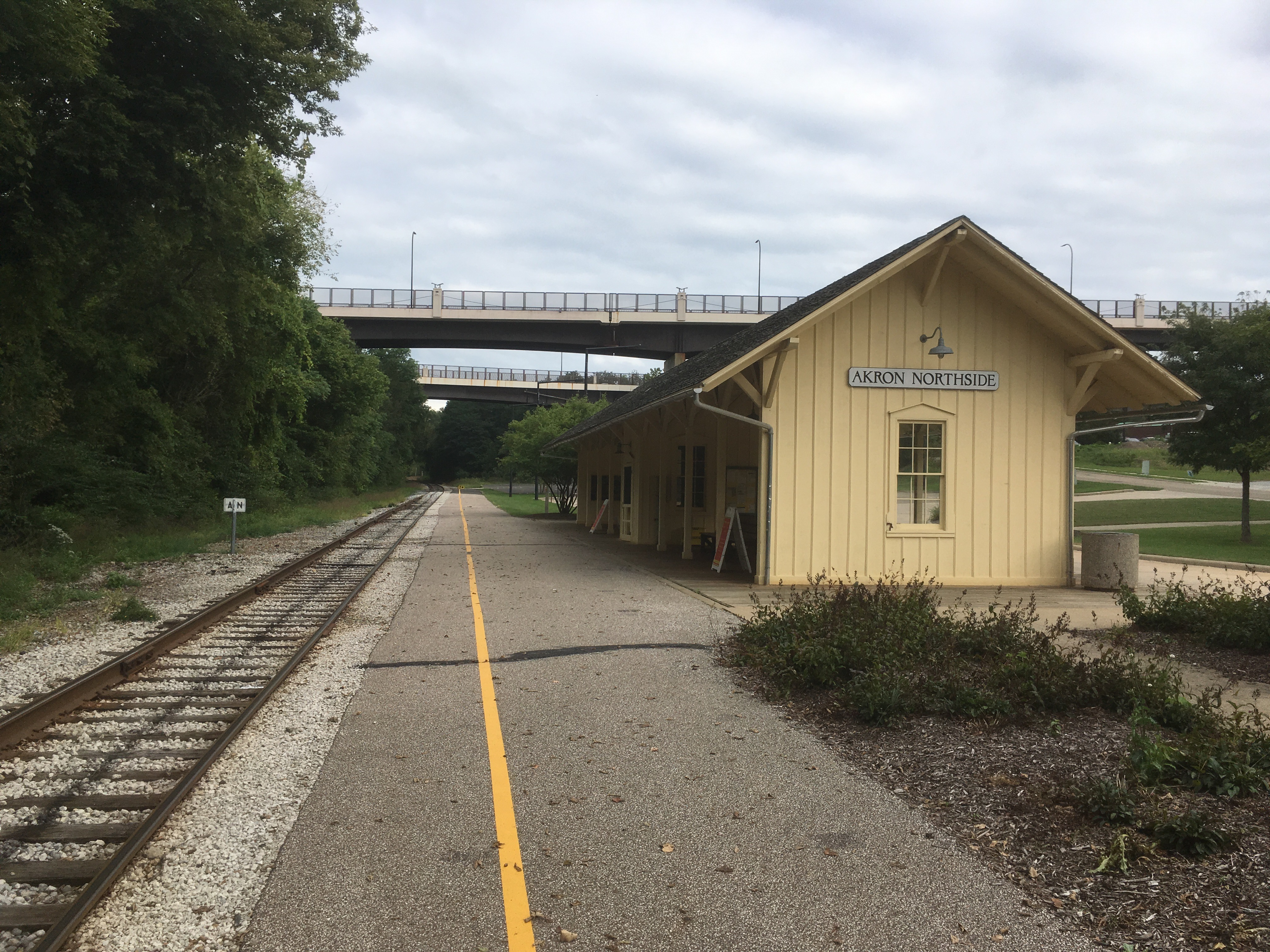

General information
- Location: 27 Ridge Street; Akron, Ohio 44308
- Coordinates: 41.0895°N 81.5150°W
- Owner: Cleveland, Terminal and Valley Railroad (1880–1915); Baltimore and Ohio Railroad (1915–1987); National Park Service (1987–present)
- Operator: Cleveland, Terminal and Valley Railroad (1880–1909); Baltimore and Ohio Railroad (1909–1962; 1979–1985); Midwest Railway Historical Foundation (1985–1990); Cuyahoga Valley Scenic Railroad (Note: Cuyahoga Valley Preservation and Scenic Railway Association d.b.a. Cuyahoga Valley Line (1990–1993)) (1990–present)
- Line: Valley Railway
- Platforms: 1 side platform
- Tracks: 1

Construction
- Parking: Yes
- Accessible: yes

History
- Opened: 1880 (Valley Line); May 22, 1976; August 1, 1993
- Closed: April 4, 1962; October 29, 1989
- Former names: Akron (Howard Street)

Services
| Preceding station | Cuyahoga Valley Scenic Railroad | Following station |
|---|---|---|
| Peninsula toward Rockside | National Park Scenic | Terminus |
| Botzum toward Rockside | Explorer | Terminus |
Former services
| Preceding station | Cuyahoga Valley Scenic Railroad | Following station |
|---|---|---|
| Big Bend toward Rockside | National Park Scenic | Canton Lincoln Highway (2003–2012) Terminus |
| Preceding station | Baltimore and Ohio Railroad | Following station |
| Peninsula toward Cleveland | Cleveland – Akron – Wheeling 1940s–1962 | Akron–Union toward Wheeling |
| Old Portage toward Cleveland | Cleveland – Akron – Wheeling 1940s–1962 | Akron–Union toward Wheeling |
| Botzum toward Cleveland | Cleveland – Akron – Valley Junction Until 1940s | Akron Junction toward Valley Junction |
Location

Akron Northside is a Cuyahoga Valley Scenic Railroad train station in Akron, Ohio. It is located adjacent to Ridge Street near Howard Street. It is the southern terminus of the Cuyahoga Valley Scenic Railroad.

== History ==
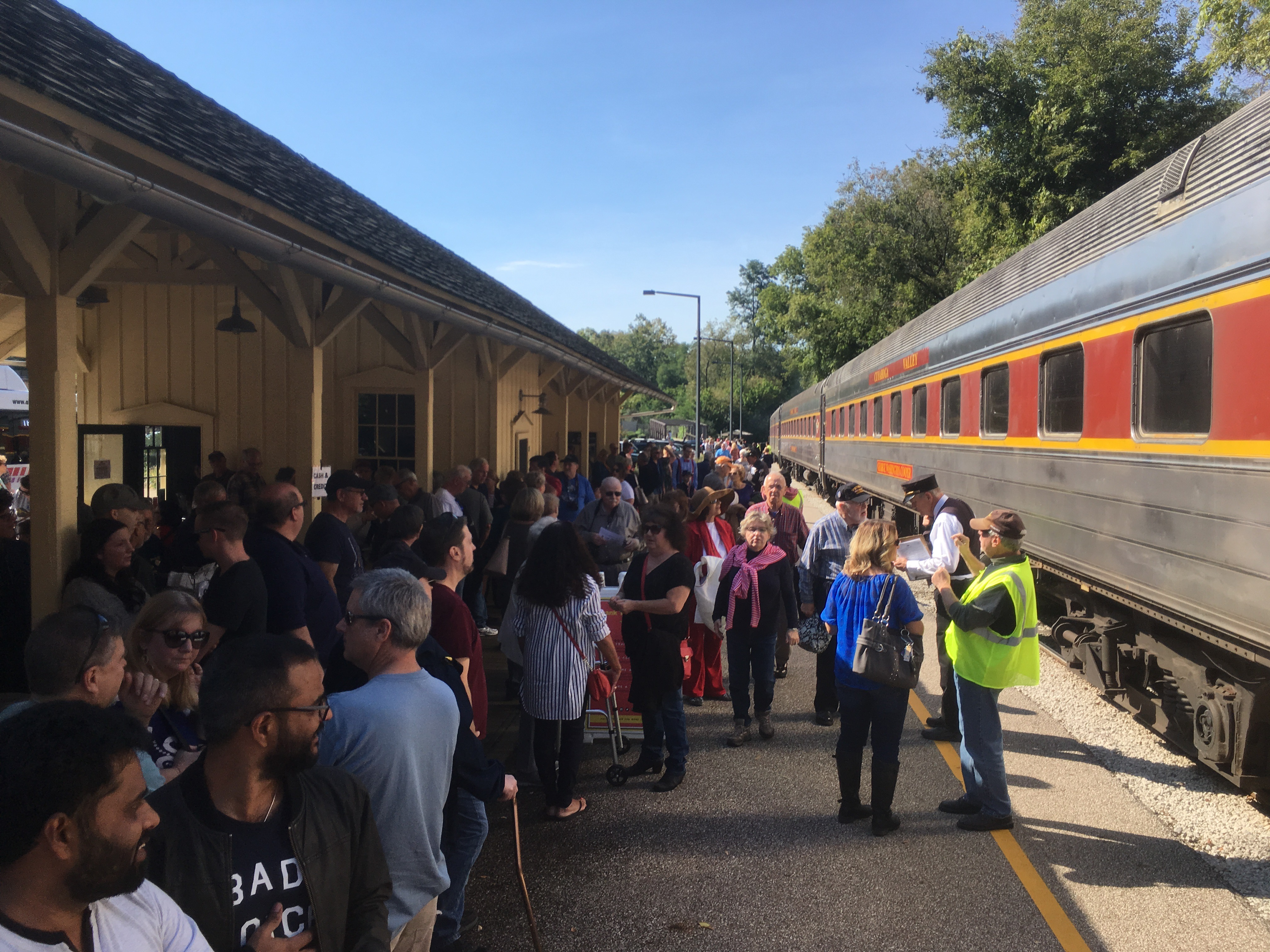
A crowd waiting to board a train pulled by Nickel Plate 765

This location was previously served by the Howard Street station of the Valley Railway (which was acquired by the Baltimore and Ohio Railroad starting in 1890). Trains began stopping here in 1880. By 1948, the station was served by the Cleveland Night Express, Shenandoah, and Washington Night Express.

Cuyahoga Valley Line (later renamed the Cuyahoga Valley Scenic Railroad) excursion trains began operating here in 1976.

In 1990, service on the Cuyahoga Valley Line was truncated to a temporary stop at Merriman Valley, due to deteriorating conditions on the Howard Street bridge. Service was restored on August 1, 1993.
