= Blenheim moraine =

The Blenheim moraine is a glacial moraine in Kent County, Ontario, north of Lake Erie.

Bluffs and beaches left from glacial lakes Arkona, Whittlesey, and Warren are found on the southern bank.

The moraine's underwater extension is called the Erieau Ridge.
