= Lake Saginaw =

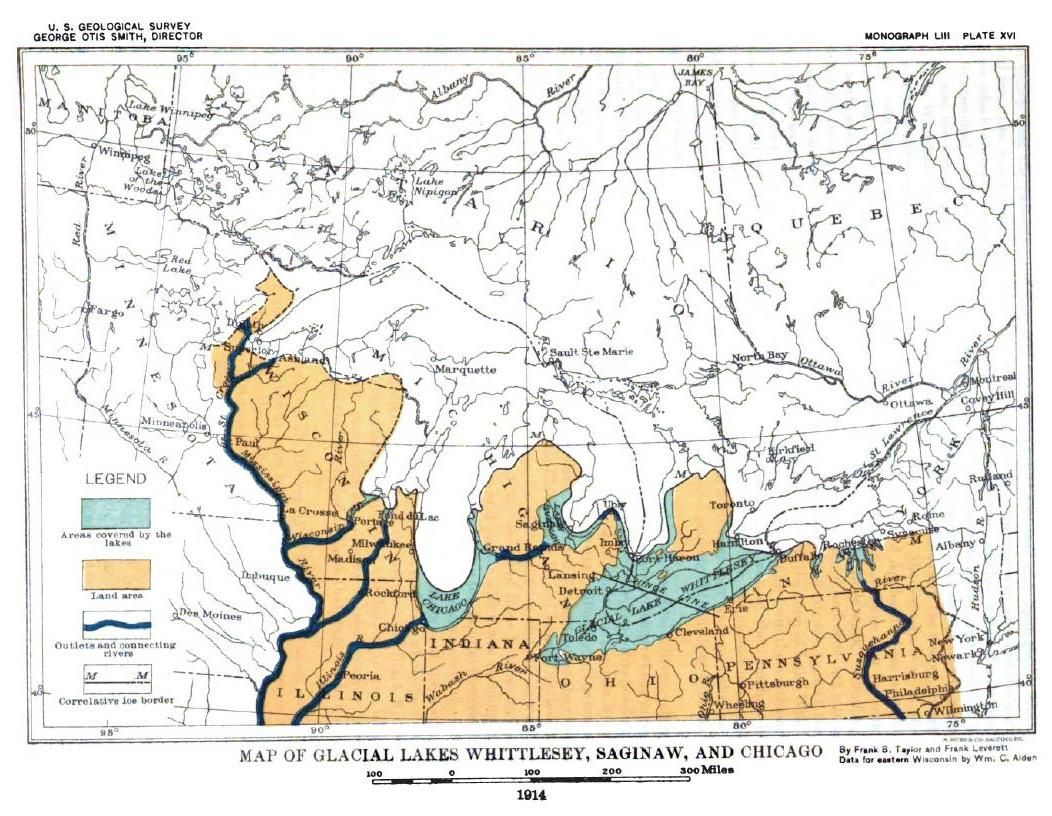
- First Lake Saginaw - Map of Glacial lakes Whittlesey, Sagniaw and Chicago, based on the USGS Report of 1915.

- Location within Michigan
- Location: North America
- Group: Great Lakes
- Coordinates: 43°55′N 83°35′W
- Lake type: former lake
- Etymology: Saginaw Bay
- Primary inflows: Laurentide Ice Sheet
- Primary outflows: Grand River valley in Michigan
- Basin countries: Canada; United States
- First flooded: 1st 12,000 years before present; 2nd
- Max. length: 70 mi (110 km)
- Max. width: 26 mi (42 km)
- Residence time: 100 years in existence
- Surface elevation: 700 ft (213 m)
- References: Chapter XV, Glacial Lake Saginaw; Frank B. Taylor; The Pleistocene of Indiana and Michigan, History of the Great Lakes; Monographs of the United States Geological Survey, Vol LIII; Frank Leverett and Frank B. Taylor; Washington, D.C.; Government Printing Office; 1915

Lake Saginaw was a former lake that occupied the basin of Saginaw Bay in what is now the state of Michigan. There were two periods when it was an independent lake, not associated with a larger body of water in the Huron basin. The first Lake Saginaw was a contemporary of the last stages of Lake Maumee. When the ice border opened allowing these two lakes to become one, it entered the period of Lake Arkona. Then, the ice advanced, closing the link forming the second Lake Saginaw. This was during the time of Lake Whittlesey. When the ice margin retreated northward for the last time, it became the western bay of Lake Wayne and then of Lake Warren and Lake Lundy. During its periods as an independent lake, its outlet was west through Grand River channel.

== First Lake Saginaw ==
Lake Saginaw began after the building of the Flint moraine and the creation of the Imlay channel (from Flint to Maple Rapids) from glacial runoff. When the ice sheet had retreated into the Saginaw basin, exposing land, water began to accumulate and the First Lake Saginaw was formed. The outlet of the lake was through Grand River to Lake Chicago, which served as the run-off from the glacier. Well-defined beaches surround the outlet at an altitude 700 feet (210 m) above sea level, To the north and west, they are higher because of isostatic rebound once the glaciers weight had been removed. The bed of the lake is nearly equally divided between a sandy and a clayey soil. Sand due to lake waves and currents is restricted to the border of the lake, while glacial outwash may be present where there was a considerable depth of water,

=== Lakes Saginaw and Arkona ===
When the ice barrier withdrew from the "thumb," a strait was opened across its northern low part and the waters on both sides merged at one level, making Lake Arkona and adding to it the area of Lake Saginaw. In this change Lake Saginaw, with its undisturbed outlet, became the controlling factor. The new lake became merely a greatly enlarged Lake Saginaw, using the same outlet and retaining the same shorelines. The Arkona beaches began to be formed. The first one merged with the existing second beach of Lake Saginaw to form a single shore., thus the second Saginaw beach merged into the first beach of Lake Arkona.

== Second Lake Saginaw ==
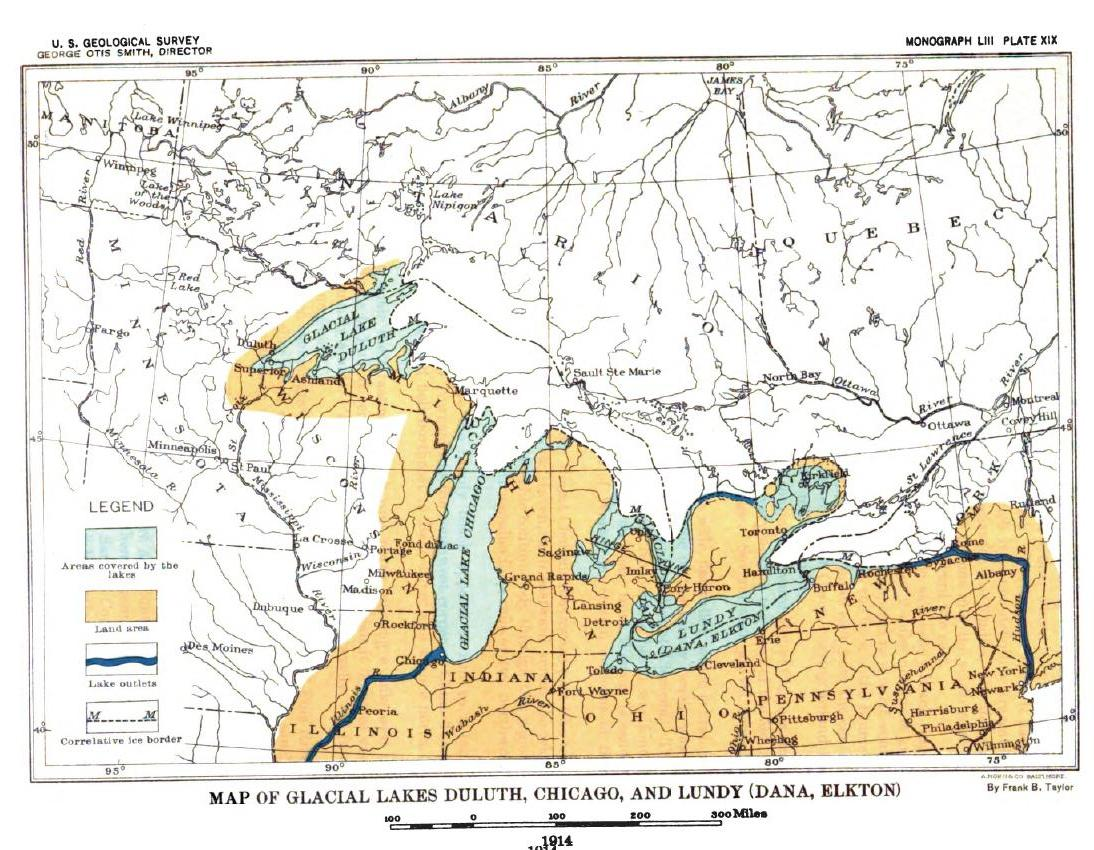
Second Lake Saginaw - Map of Glacial Lakes Duluth, Chicago, and Lundy (USGS 1915)

The ice front advanced from its position as the barrier of Lake Arkona it closed the strait around the "thumb" and raised the waters east of it about 44 feet, thus inaugurating Lake Whittlesey. The change, however, caused no notable alteration in the discharge from Lake Saginaw, because from its beginning to the time of Lake Arkona Lake Maumee discharged into it, and after Lake Arkona ceased Lake Whittlesey discharged into it. Hence, the volume of water passing out of Lake Saginaw was not affected by the changes. During the time of Lake Whittlesey, therefore, Lake Saginaw had a second period of independent existence with its area almost at a maximum. It seems certain that the lower Arkona ridge of the Saginaw basin was made chiefly by the waves of Lake Arkona, and it seems equally sure that during the time of Lake Whittlesey the waves of Lake Saginaw beat upon this same beach, although nothing clearly establishing this relation has been observed. In the absence of positive evidence one way or the other, these inferences seem natural and necessary.

The Later Lake Saginaw extended about to the limits of the First Lake Saginaw on the west and south, for its outlet was through the same channel, along Grand River to Lake Chicago, and at but a few feet lower level. The limits on the northeast or ice-ward side were at the Port Huron moraine, and are thus more definitely fixed than the limits of the Earlier Lake Saginaw. The lake extended up the Cass river valley about to Cass City and up the Tittabawassee valley at least to northeastern Gladwin and possibly into southeastern Ogemaw county.

=== Lakes Saginaw and Wayne ===
When the waters fell from Lake Whittlesey they were lowered about 80 feet, not to the Warren beach, as one might suppose, but to the Wayne beach and perhaps later to a lower level. The Wayne beach lies about 20 feet below the Warren and shows modification by submergence after it was made, in this respect resembling the Arkona beaches. There is much reason for thinking that this lake fell to still lower levels before its end. No proof of this has been found, but its outlet was near Syracuse, N. Y., where the situation favored large changes of lake level with relatively small oscillations of the ice front. While Lake Saginaw formed a part of Lake Wayne it abandoned the Grand River channel, its water standing a little below the head of that outlet.

=== Lakes Saginaw and Warren ===
When the ice barrier advanced into Lake Wayne, the water rose to the level of the Warren beach. Once again the Grand River became the outlet. Lake Warren has been the name given to this state, with shorelines 25 feet (7.6 m) or 30 feet (9.1 m) lower than the Arkona ridges.

=== Lakes Saginaw and Lundy (Lake Dana & Lake Elkton) ===
Lake Lundy followed Lake Warren when a new outlet to the east opened in the Mohawk River Valley. The Grand River outlet was again abandoned for the final time. Lake Saginaw had ended with the onset of the Lake Warren stage. But the opening of a lower outlet along the Mohawk, ended the chance for another independent lake to arise in Saginaw Bay.

== Grand River Channel ==
The Grand River channel was in use a much longer time than any other channel in Michigan. It began to carry the lake waters when the outlet of Lake Maumee first opened near Imlay, before the beginning of Lake Saginaw. Later it received the discharge from Lake Maumee through the first Lake Saginaw. Next it received the overflow of the merged Lakes Arkona and Saginaw. Later it received the waters of Lake Whittlesey and Saginaw. Only when the ice retreated from the Port Huron morainic system and Lake Saginaw merged again eastward and became part of Lake Wayne was the Grand River channel temporarily abandoned. Through all previous changes, apparently without break or intermission from the first opening of the Imlay outlet, it had carried the overflow. Later the ice advanced, closing the eastern outlet past Syracuse creating Lake Warren, which discharged through the Grand River channel. The Warren beaches lie 20 feet (6.1 m) or 25 feet (7.6 m) above the broad, swampy, dune-covered divide at the head of the channel north of Bannister.

== See also ==
- Lake Chicago
- Lake Arkona
- Lake Whittlesey
