= Erieau ridge =

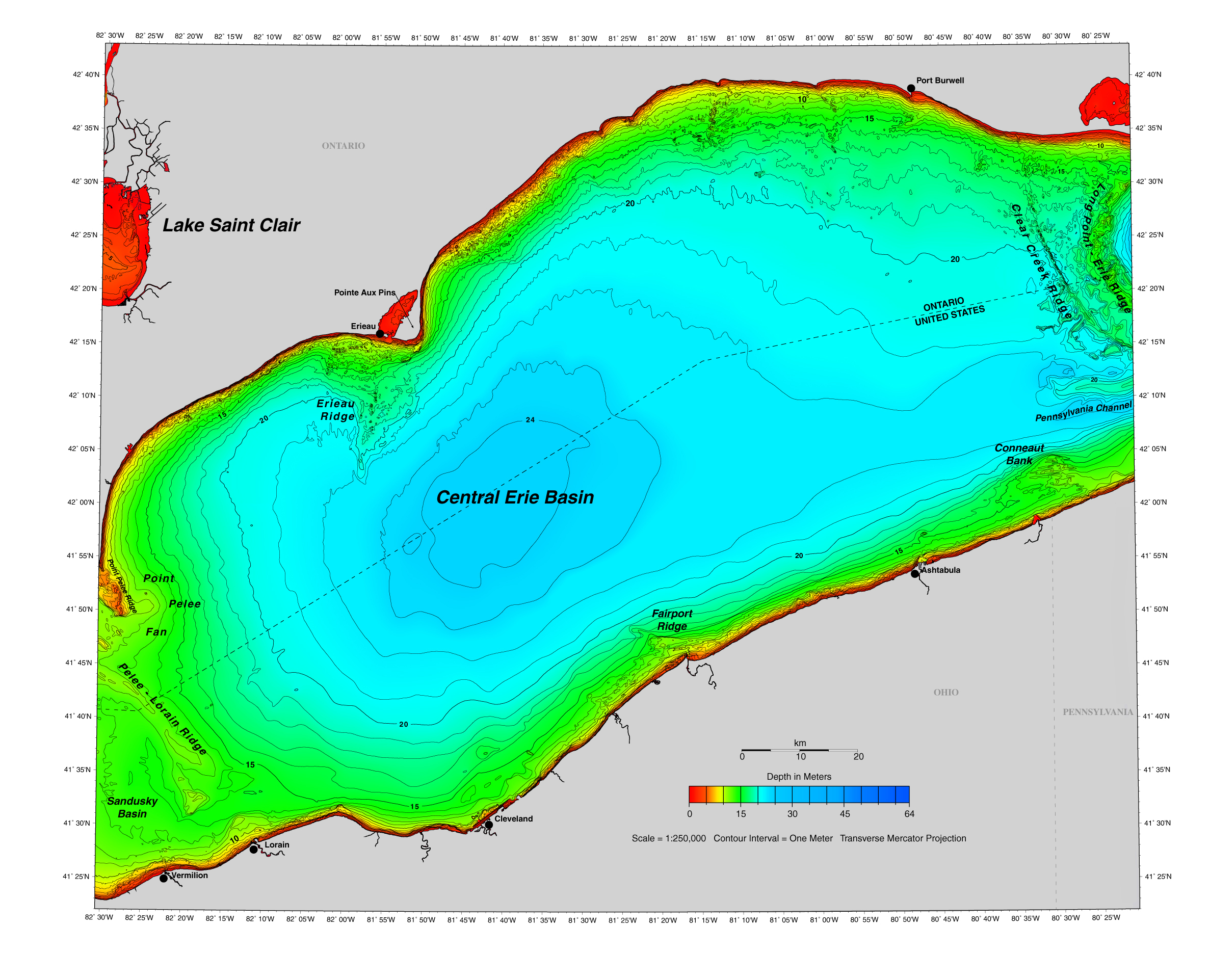

Erieau ridge is a glacial moraine that crosses into Lake Erie near Erieau, Ontario and Pointe aux Pins.

The ridge may be the offshore extension of the Blenheim moraine.
