= Portage Escarpment =

Landform in the United States

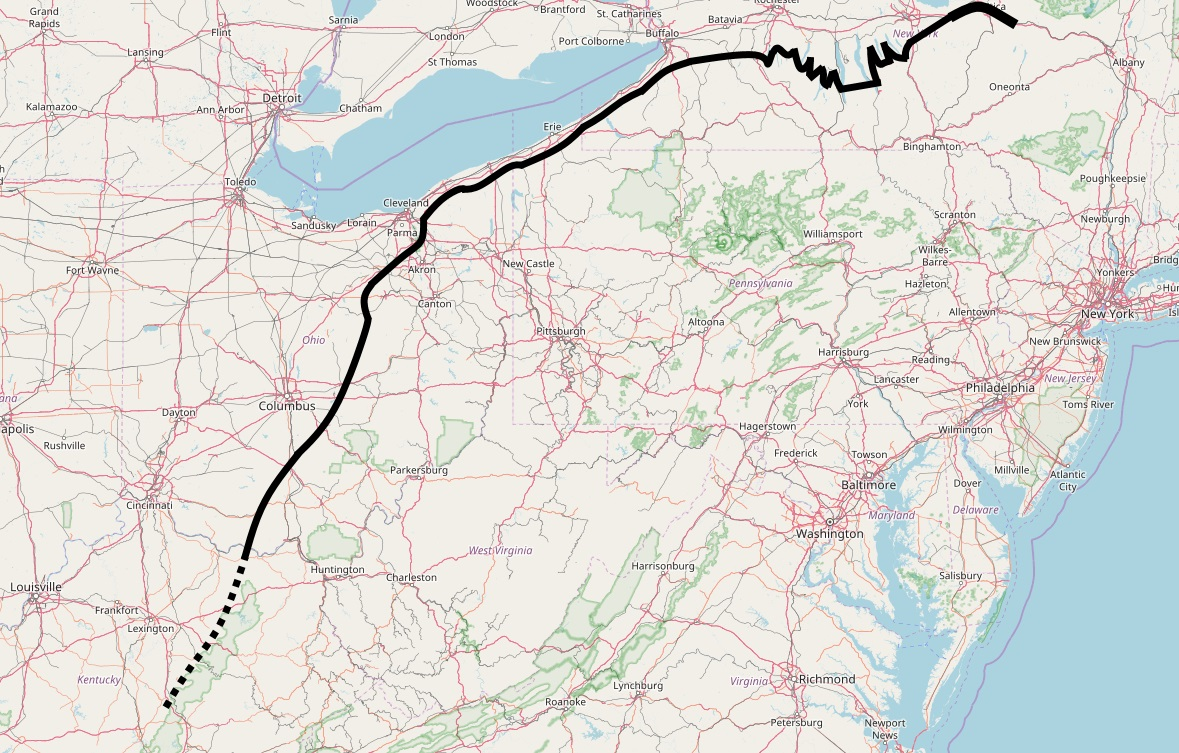
Rough map of the Portage Escarpment (black line) in New York, Pennsylvania, and Ohio.

The Portage Escarpment is a major landform in the U.S. states of Ohio, Pennsylvania, and New York which marks the boundary between the Till Plains to the north and west and the Appalachian Plateau to the east and south. The escarpment is the defining geological feature of New York's Finger Lakes region. Its proximity to Lake Erie creates a narrow but easily traveled route between upstate New York and the Midwest. Extensive industrial and residential development occurred along this route.

It is also called the Allegheny Escarpment in its southern portion after it diverges from Lake Erie in Ohio.

== General description ==
The Portage Escarpment forms the northern and western boundary between the Appalachian Plateau and the Till Plains of the Central Lowland physiographic section of the United States.

The escarpment begins in eastern New York. Nevin Fenneman placed its starting point between Cayuga Lake and Seneca Lake, where the Onondaga Escarpment transitions to the sandstone of the Portage Escarpment. But New York state officials concluded that it began east of Auburn, New York. As it approaches Buffalo, New York, it turns to the southwest and hugs the shore of Lake Erie. The escarpment moves across northwest Pennsylvania, continuing close to the shoreline.

In Ohio, the escarpment gradually moves further away from shore. At Cleveland, Ohio, it turns sharply southward. It proceeds in an undulating south-southwest direction across Ohio, Kentucky, and Tennessee. In these latter two states it is known as the Highland Rim.

The landform's name is derived from attempts by the French to establish a portage over the escarpment in the 1750s which would link their Great Lakes forts with their fort at Pittsburgh.

=== New York ===
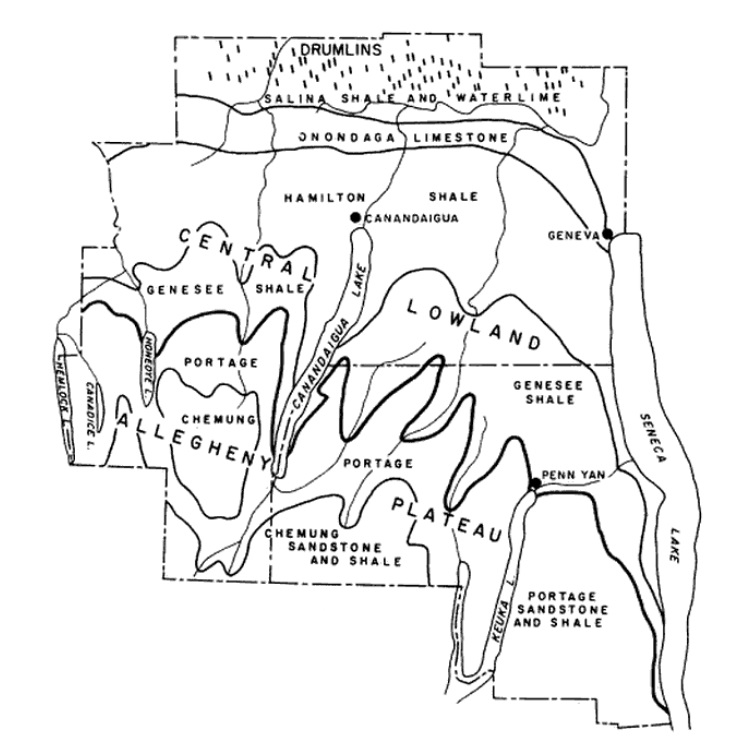
The Portage Escarpment (heavy black line) as it weaves through Ontario and Yates Counties in New York.

In New York state, the Portage Escarpment (also known as the "Finger Lakes sedimentary deposit") consists of sandstone interbedded with shale. The base is almost all black and gray soft shale, while the upper portion is interbedded sandstone and shale. Because the more durable sandstone is not a capstone, the escarpment does not have a sharp, defined cliff or crest. This geologic makeup gives it a slope instead, and it often appears as two or more parallel terraces.

The Portage Escarpment's eastern end is in the Finger Lakes region, where it is the dominant topographic feature. Prior to the Wisconsin glaciation (the last ice age), roughly 24 major rivers flowed north over the escarpment. The Wisconsin glaciation began about 85,000 years ago, and the ice reached its southernmost point approximately 25,000–21,000 years ago during the Last Glacial Maximum. The ice sheet could not overcome the Portage Escarpment. Instead, the ice scoured downward, creating 11 long gouges in the earth. When the ice age ended about 10,000 years ago, these gouges filled with water coming down the escarpment and became the 11 Finger Lakes. The Portage Escarpment essentially runs along the southernmost tips of each finger lake. The glacial gouging and subsequent erosion by rivers and streams has led to the creation of deep valleys which extend southward as far as the southern tip of the Finger Lakes. This makes the escarpment appear to weave north and south in deep loops. The Wisconsin glaciation's scouring of the land in front of the escarpment in the Finger Lakes area has left the escarpment with a steeper slope than elsewhere in New York state. Here, the escarpment can be 900 to 1,000 feet (270 to 300 m) in height.

West of the Finger Lakes region, the Portage Escarpment is relatively straight. The interbedded sandstone and shale here has suffered extensive erosion. In Livingston County, New York, this has left it much less well-defined.

The Tonawanda Plain lies along the north side of the escarpment from its eastern terminus to Lake Erie. This lacustrine plain is bounded on the north by the Niagara Escarpment. Although quite wide at the eastern end of Lake Erie, the plain narrows considerably along the lake's southern shore. Here, the plain continues to be bounded by the Portage Escarpment, which turns southwest in a series of indefinite hills at Hamburg, Orchard Park, and East Aurora.

=== Pennsylvania ===
The Portage Escarpment continues to hug the southern shoreline of Lake Erie in Pennsylvania. It passes solely through Erie County, where it is 2 to 4 miles (3.2 to 6.4 km) from the lake. Here, Mississippian sandstone predominates over shale, and the escarpment rises to between 200 and 300 feet (61 and 91 m) in height.

From Erie, Pennsylvania, to Cleveland, the escarpment is a little further from the shore, about 4 to 6 miles (6.4 to 9.7 km).

=== Ohio ===
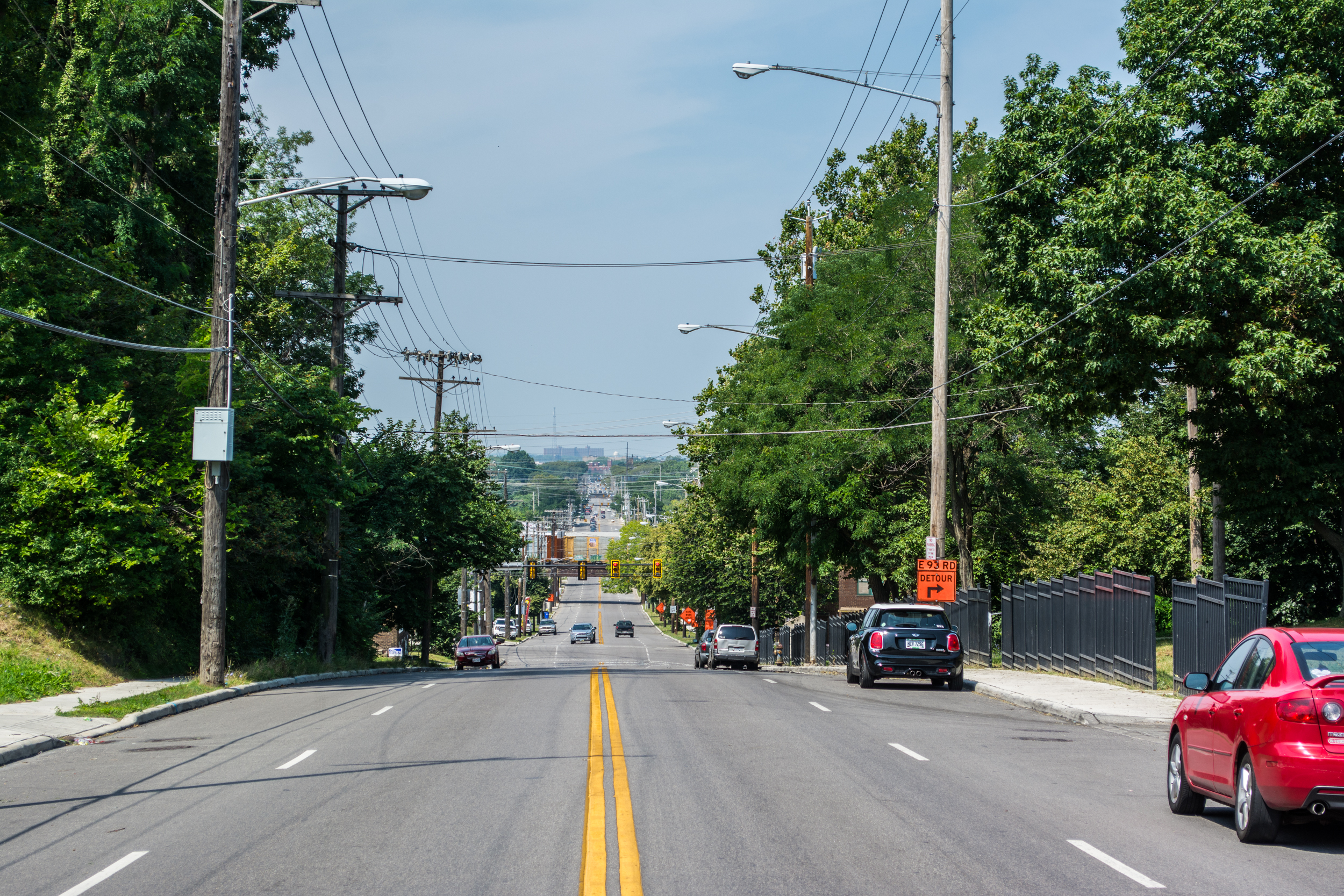
Standing atop the Portage Escarpment at about E. 110th Street, looking west down Woodland Avenue in Cleveland.

The Portage Escarpment also largely controlled where the Wisconsin glaciation stopped in Ohio. The lacustrine Erie Plain lies beyond it to the northwest and west. (Note: Lake Erie occupies a depression in the middle of the Erie Plain.)

The escarpment continues to hug Lake Erie until it reaches Cleveland. In this portion, the escarpment rises in three distinct terraces: A first terrace, which is about 100 to 150 feet (30 to 46 m) above the plain; a second terrace, about 50 feet (15 m) higher than the first terrace; and a third terrace, about 300 feet (91 m) higher than the second terrace. In total, it ranges from 440 to 540 feet (130 to 160 m) in height, and is 2 to 4 miles (3.2 to 6.4 km) wide, giving it a slope of 40 to 80 feet (12 to 24 m) per 1 mile (1.6 km). East of Cleveland, much of the lower portions of the escarpment are covered in glacial moraine. Both the upper and lower parts are cut by numerous dry ravines, rivers, and streams. (Note: The Wisconsin glaciation is primarily responsible for the drainage patterns in Ohio. At first, the glaciers extended southward across most of Ohio. As they retreated, water shed from the glaciers carved channels southward to the Ohio River. When the glaciers retreated beyond the Portage Escarpment, water was trapped between the glaciers and the Portage Escarpment, creating ever-larger lakes. As the glaciers retreated northward again, the water found an outlet through the St. Lawrence River, carving new drainage valleys through the lake-facing side of the escarpment and the Erie Plain.) This makes the escarpment somewhat discontinuous. The upper terrace of the escarpment is difficult to distinguish from the Appalachian Plateau beyond, because both are eroded so deeply by water. Where the escarpment meets the Erie Plain, it is much more well-defined.

Where the escarpment meets the valley of the Cuyahoga River, it bends southward and begins moving even further away from the shore. It is 4 to 5 miles (6.4 to 8.0 km) distant from the shore between the Cuyahoga River and the Rocky River, and 17 miles (27 km) distant from the shore west of the Rocky River. Here, the escarpment rises between 200 and 300 feet (61 and 91 m) in a single step. The much lower height of the escarpment has allowed glacial till to build up and cover much of the escarpment's topography. This part of the escarpment is extremely discontinuous, as it is broken by the broad river valleys of the Great Miami and Scioto rivers. Southwest of the Scioto River, the escarpment forms the western boundary of the Shawnee–Mississippian Plateau region, the most rugged area in Ohio.

== Cultural and historic importance ==
That portion of the Erie Plain between Lake Erie and the Portage Escarpment connects the Central Lowland of the Midwest with the Mohawk Valley in the east, and provides the only natural, low-lying route north of the Gulf Coast to the North American interior from the Atlantic seaboard. Consequently, this area is heavily populated. Settlement of Ohio largely occurred along the Erie Plain, following the natural route created adjacent to the Portage Escarpment barrier.

== See also ==
- List of escarpments

== Bibliography ==
- Bolsenga, Stanley J.; Herdendorf, Charles E. (1993). "Introduction". In Bolsenga, Stanley J.; Herdendorf, Charles E. (eds.). Lake Erie and Lake St. Clair Handbook. Detroit: Wayne State University Press. ISBN 9780814324707.
- Cushing, Henry Platt; Leverett, Frank; Van Horn, Frank R. (1931). Geology and Mineral Resources of the Cleveland District, Ohio. Bulletin 818. Washington, D.C.: U.S. Geological Survey.
- Dawson, A.G. (2016). Ice Age Earth: Late Quaternary Geology and Climate. New York: Routledge. ISBN 9781138171794.
- Ellis, William Donohue; Shogren, Kinley T. (1966). The Cuyahoga. New York: Holt, Rinehart and Winston.
- Fenneman, Nevin Melancthon (1917). "Huron". Physiographic Divisions of the United States. Albany, N.Y.: Association of American Geographers.
- Fisher, Donald W. (1981). "Introduction". In Tesmer, Irving H. (ed.). Colossal Cataract: The Geologic History of Niagara Falls. Albany, N.Y.: State University of New York Press. ISBN 0873955226.
- Freeman, Rich; Freeman, Sue (2002). 200 Waterfalls in Central and Western New York: A Finders' Guide. Fishers, N.Y.: Footprint Press. ISBN 9781930480018.
- Hubbard, George D.; Stauffer, Clinton R.; Bownocker, John Adams; Prosser, Charles Smith; Cumings, Edgar Rosecoe (1915). Geologic Atlas of the United States, Issue 197. Washington, D.C.: U.S. Geologic Survey.
- New York State Department of Transportation (1983). Southern Tier Expressway Study, Project Report II, Hinsdale, N.Y. to Erie, Pa (Report). Albany, N.Y.: N.Y. State Department of Transportation.
- Oglesby, Ray T. (1978). "The Limnology of Cayuga Lake". In Bloomfield, Jay A. (ed.). Lakes of New York State. Volume 1: Ecology of the Finger Lakes. New York: Academic Press. ISBN 9780121073015.
- Pearson, C.S.; Johnsgard, J.A.; Secor, Wilber; Kerr, H.A.; Westgate, P.J.; Kirby, R.H.; Goodman, R.B.; Cline, M.G.; Simmons, C.S.; Granville, J.M. (August 1956). Soil Survey: Livingston County, New York. Series 1941, No. 15. Washington, D.C.: Soil Conservation Service, U.S. Department of Agriculture.
- Stout, Wilber; Ver Steeg, Karl; Lamb, George Franklin (1943). Geology of Water in Ohio. Columbus, Ohio: Geological Survey of Ohio.
- Szabo, John P.; Angle, Michael P.; Eddy, Alex M. (2011). "Pleistocene Glaciation of Ohio, USA". In Ehlers, Jurgen; Gibbard, Philip L.; Hughes, Philip D. (eds.). Quaternary Glaciations: Extent and Chronology: A Closer Look. Oxford, U.K.: Elsevier. ISBN 9780444534477.
- von Engeln, O.D. (1988). The Finger Lakes Region: Its Origin and Nature. Ithaca, N.Y.: Cornell University Press. ISBN 9780801495014.
- Waller, Adolph Edward (1921). The Relation of Plant Succession to Crop Production, a Contribution to Crop Ecology. Columbus, Ohio: The Ohio State University.
- Water Pollution Control Board (1953). The Lake Erie (East End)—Niagara River Drainage Basin Series. Issue 3. Albany, N.Y.: New York State Department of Health.
- White, Marian E. (2004). "Huron". In Trigger, Bruce G. (ed.). Handbook of North American Indians: Northeast. Volume 15. Washington, D.C.: Smithsonian Institution. ISBN 9780160723001.
- Whitney, Gordon Graham (1994). From Coastal Wilderness to Fruited Plain: A History of Environmental Change in Temperate North America, 1500 to the Present. New York: Cambridge University Press. ISBN 9780521576581.
- Wilder, Henry J.; Maynadier, Gustavus B.; Shaw, Charles F. (1911). "A Reconnaissance Survey of Northwest Pennsylvania". In Whitney, Milton (ed.). Field Operations of the Bureau of Soils, 1908. Washington, D.C.: Government Printing Office.
- Wilson, Michael P.; Boria, William T. (1999). "Quaternary Geology and Water Supply Issues". Field Trip Guide for the 71st Annual Meeting of the New York State Geological Association. Albany, N.Y.: New York State Geological Association.
