= Lake Maumee =

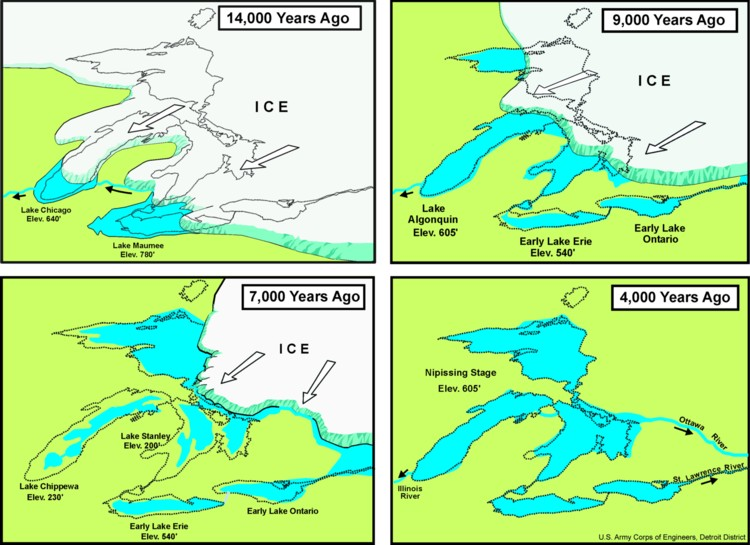
- Stages of great lake development.

- Location within Michigan
- Location: North America
- Group: Great Lakes
- Coordinates: 41.8133°N 82.4652°W
- Lake type: former lake
- Etymology: Wabash River; Sixmile Creek Channel, 780 ft (238 m); Imlay Outlet, 849 ft (259 m)
- Primary inflows: Laurentide Ice Sheet
- Primary outflows: Wabash River
- Basin countries: Canada; United States
- First flooded: before 17,500 years before present
- Max. length: 326 mi (525 km)
- Max. width: 113 mi (182 km)
- Residence time: 1300 years in existence
- Surface elevation: 800 ft (244 m)
- References: The Pleistocene of Indiana and Michigan, History of the Great Lakes; Chapter XIII, Glacial Lake Maumee; Frank B. Taylor; Monographs of the United States Geological Survey, Vol LIII; Frank Leverett and Frank B. Taylor; Washington, D.C.; Government Printing Office; 1915

Lake Maumee was a proglacial lake and an ancestor of present-day Lake Erie. It formed about 17,500 calendar years, or 14,000 Radiocarbon Years Before Present (RCYBP) as the Huron-Erie Lobe of the Laurentide Ice Sheet retreated at the end of the Wisconsin glaciation. As water levels continued to rise the lake evolved into Lake Arkona and then Lake Whittlesey.

== Origin ==
As the ice sheet retreated at the end of the last ice age, it left meltwater in a previously existing low-lying area that was the valley of an eastward-flowing river known as the Erigan River that probably emptied into the Atlantic Ocean following the route of today's Saint Lawrence River. Some geologists think that the Erigan could have been a downstream segment of the preglacial Teays River system. The glaciers destroyed or disturbed most of the preglacial drainage patterns and enlarged and deepened the Erigan basin.

Lake Maumee is the first of a series of glacial lakes which occupied the Erie basin. It was preceded by a few small, disconnected lakes which lay between the ice margin and the southern divide of Erie basin. The name Lake Maumee was first applied in 1888 by G. R. Dryer of the Indiana Geological Survey in an official report on the geology of Allen County, Indiana.

== Height of water ==
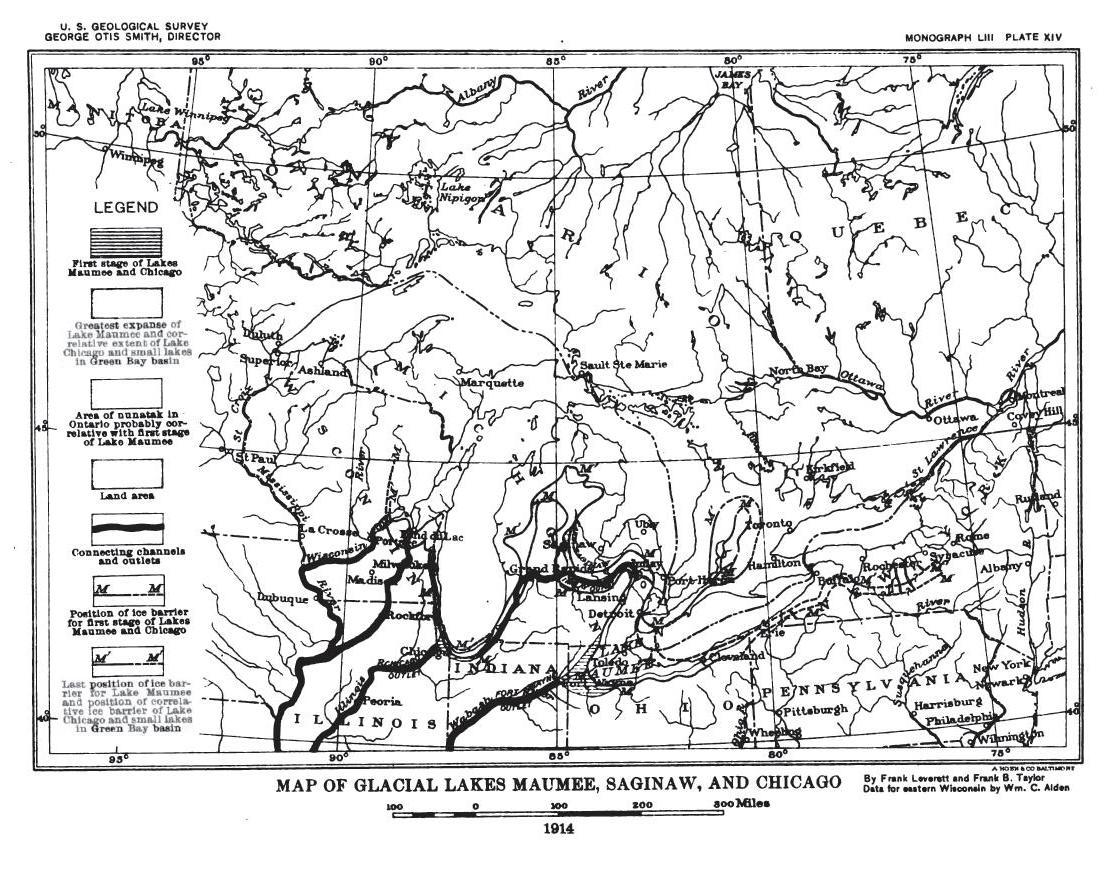
Map of Glacial Lake Maumee, Saginaw, and Chicago, based on the USGS Report of 1915

As the Erie Lobe retreated to the northeast, it left large debris deposits called moraines running at right angles to its line of retreat. One of these, called the Fort Wayne Moraine, was left at the site of present-day Fort Wayne, Indiana, where it acted as a dam that held back the waters of the lake. When the water was at its highest point, about 800 feet ASL (244 m ASL, but as low as 210-224 masl in stable Maumee delta zones due to differential isostatic rebound of end moraines), it left beach ridges that later became the routes of trails and highways. During this stage, the waters of the lake, possibly in response to an advance of the ice front at the lake's eastern end, overtopped a "sag" in the Fort Wayne Moraine. This caused a catastrophic drainage of the lake known as the Maumee Torrent that scoured a one- to two-mile-wide outlet running southwest to the Wabash River known as the Wabash-Erie Channel.

== Outlets ==
The lake's initial outlet was at present day Fort Wayne, Indiana, the lowest place on the border of the basin. Its altitude seems to have been at first about 785 feet (239 m), or 212 feet (65 m) above the current level of Lake Erie, but during its life as an outlet, reduced to 760 feet (230 m). At its highest point, the lake used this single outlet. Later, after further ice melt a northerly outlet was reached near present-day Imlay City, Michigan, and lake had two outlets for a short time.

The highest beach is 785 to 790 feet (239 to 241 m), near the Fort Wayne outlet, In Michigan it is about 800 feet (240 m)with areas in Lapeer county its nearly 850 feet (260 m). The Imlay outlet is 805 to 810 feet (245 to 247 m) above sea level or 50 feet (15 m) above the bed of the Fort Wayne outlet. This outlet flowed to the west, into a developing Lake Saginaw and thence into the Grand River Channel (proto Maple and Lower Grand rivers).

The highest beach is very irregular. The first or highest beach exposure to wave action that the other beaches do not reflect. The second beach is more regular, and on the whole somewhat stronger than the highest. There is a third beach, which is generally weak and in places difficult to trace. The third beach connects with well-defined deltas which the higher levels do not have. The most notable are at the Raisin and the Huron rivers. The third beach is 20 feet (6.1 m) below the Imlay outlet. The outlet at that time may be across the "Thumb" in a lower passage a few miles north. The readvance of the ice sheet may have closed this outlet with a moraine closely bordering the Imlay outlet.

The lake beaches, because of their sandy or gravelly constitution, form better lines for highways than neighboring clayey tracts. Thus, early roads followed these natural routes along the lakes. The move to building roads on north and south and east and west lines has led to the abandonment of all or part of these ‘beach’ roads.

== The lake retreats in stages ==
Stages of Glacial Lake Maumee
Stage	Years Ago	Elevation (ft)	Elevation (m)	Outlet
Highest	14,000	800	244	Wabash-Erie Channel
Lowest	13,800	760	232	Grand River
Middle	-	780	238	Imlay Outlet

Two later stages of Lake Maumee, (called the "Lowest" and the "Middle," in that order) had lower water levels because the retreating ice exposed an outlet lower than the Wabash-Erie Channel. The Lowest Maumee (elevation: about 760 ft (232 m) ASL) drained westward through the Grand River in Michigan and into Glacial Lake Chicago, an ancestor of present-day Lake Michigan. Another advance of the ice blocked that outlet, raising the lake level to about 780 feet (240 m) ASL, the stage known as the Middle Maumee. A new outlet, the Imlay Outlet, formed that connected with an unobstructed segment of the Grand River farther west. There is enough uncertainty about this sequence that some authorities think that Middle Maumee might have preceded Lowest Maumee.

Fluctuations in water level continued through more stages (Arkona, 695 feet (212 m); Whittlesey, 738 feet (225 m) ASL; Warren and Wayne, 660–685 feet (201–209 m) ASL; and Lundy, 590–640 feet (180–200 m) ASL. This see-saw pattern continued until an eastern outlet opened at Niagara, establishing the drainage pattern of modern Lake Erie (569 feet (173 m) ASL). This involved the reversal of drainage in what is now northeastern Indiana and northwestern Ohio as the Maumee River outlet developed by capturing streams that formerly drained into the Wabash. The Great Black Swamp that once occupied much of the land between Sandusky, Ohio, and New Haven, Indiana, was a remnant of the bed of Glacial Lake Maumee. Geologists call the former lake bottom the Maumee Lacustrine Plain.

=== Highest beach ===
The altitude of the highest Maumee beach is 775 to 780 feet (236 to 238 m) at the head of the outlet in the vicinity of Fort Wayne and New Haven, Ind. To the northeast, 50 to 75 miles (80 to 121 km), along the Ohio and Michigan state line, it is 20 to 25 feet (6.1 to 7.6 m) higher. In West Unity and Fayette, Ohio, the beach is at 801 and 798 feet (244 and 243 m). The strong beach is generally above 800 feet (240 m)and at a few points rises to 810 and 812 feet (247 and 247 m).

Table I
Lake Maumee – High Beach
City/County	State	Altitude
Ann Arbor area	Michigan	795 to 805 feet (242 to 245 m)
north of Birmingham	Michigan	800 to 810 feet (240 to 250 m)
16 miles (26 km) north of Washington	Michigan	820 feet (250 m)
Clinton River	Michigan	810 feet (250 m)
Imlay	Michigan	850 feet (260 m)
Goodland Township, Lapeer County, 6 miles (9.7 km) north of Imlay	Michigan	855 feet (261 m)

On the south side of Lake Maumee the highest beach 775 and 785 feet (236 and 239 m) from Fort Wayne to Cleveland. The maps show it to be 810 and 812 feet (247 and 247 m) from Delphos to Findlay.

== See also ==
- Early Lake Erie
- Great Black Swamp
- Lake Arkona
- Lake Warren
- Lake Wayne
- Lake Whittlesey
- Champlain Sea
- Lake Ojibway
- Lake Algonquin
- Lake Agassiz
- Lake Chicago
- Last Glacial Maximum
- Midcontinent Rift System
- Niagara Escarpment
- Nipissing Great Lakes
- List of prehistoric lakes
