= Lake Whittlesey =

Ancient Canadian lake

Coordinates: 42.5°N 81.5°W

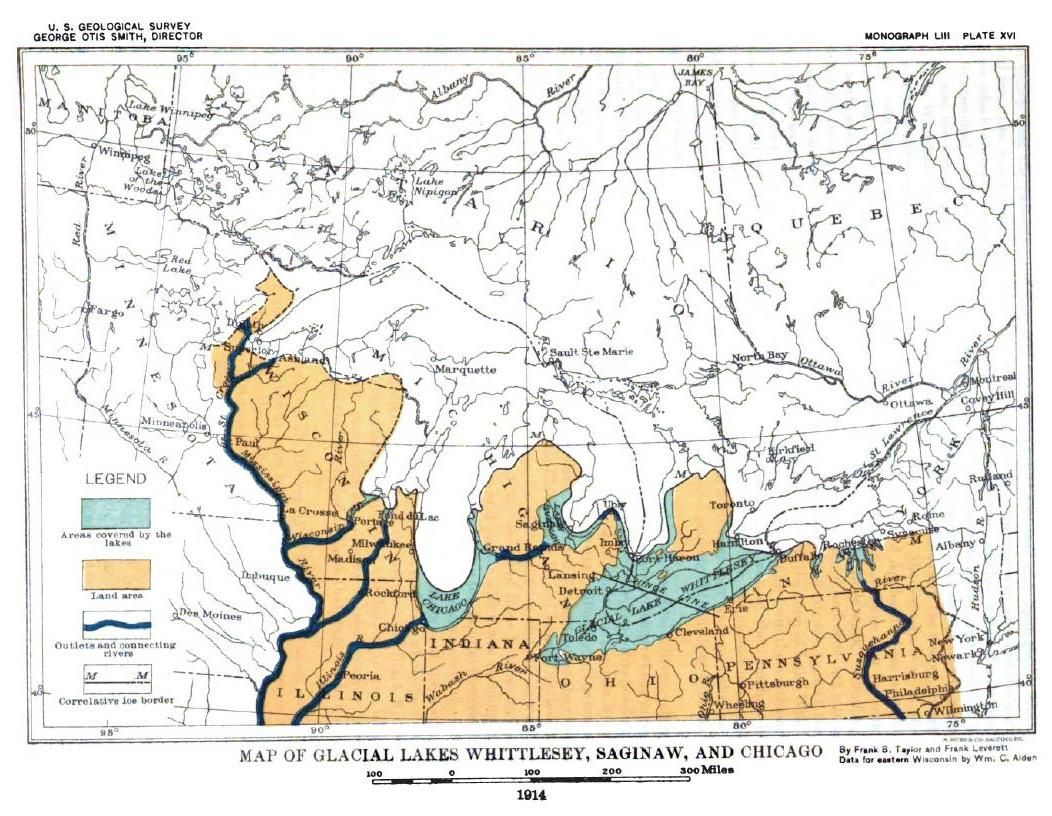
Map of Glacial lakes Whittlesey, Saginaw and Chicago, based on the USGS Report of 1915

Lake Whittlesey was a proglacial lake that was an ancestor of present-day Lake Erie. It formed about 14,000 years ago. As the Erie Lobe of the Wisconsin Glacier retreated at the end of the last ice age, it left melt-water in a previously existing depression area that was the valley of an eastward-flowing river known as the Erigan River that probably emptied into the Atlantic Ocean following the route of today's Saint Lawrence River. The lake stood at 735–740 feet (224–226 m) above sea level. The remanent beach is not horizontal as there is a ‘hinge line’ southwest of a line from Ashtabula, Ohio, through the middle part of Lake St. Clair. The hinge line is where the horizontal beaches of the lake have been warped upwards towards the north by the isostatic rebound as the weight of the ice sheet was removed from the land. The rise is 60 feet (18 m) north into Michigan and the Ubly outlet. The current altitude of the outlet is 800 feet (240 m) above sea level. Where the outlet entered the Second Lake Saginaw at Cass City the elevation is 740 feet (230 m) above sea level. The Lake Whittlesey beach called the Belmore Beach and is a gravel ridge 10–15 feet (3.0–4.6 m) high and one-eighth mile (18 meters) wide. Lake Whittlesey was maintained at the level of the Ubly outlet only until the ice melted back on the "Thumb" far enough to open a lower outlet. This ice recession went far enough to allow the lake to drop about 20 feet (6.1 m) below the lowest of the Arkona beaches to Lake Warren levels.

The strip of Lake bottom between the Whittlesey and Warren beaches in southeastern Michigan is largely a clayey plain, the principal exceptions being at deltas of Lake Arkona. The deltas of streams entering Lake Whittlesey are less conspicuous than of the same streams in connection with its predecessor, Lake Arkona. One reason for this is the fact that the rise of water caused estuarine conditions for some distance up the valleys beyond the Whittlesey beach, and it was necessary to fill these estuaries from their heads down-stream past the beach before the lake-bed proper would receive a coating of delta material. Frank Taylor named this body of water, Lake Whittlesey in 1897, in honour of Charles Whittlesey. The lake created the Belmore beach of the Erie-Huron basin. It flowed across the "thumb" of Michigan, through an outlet known as the Ubly outlet.

== Deltas ==
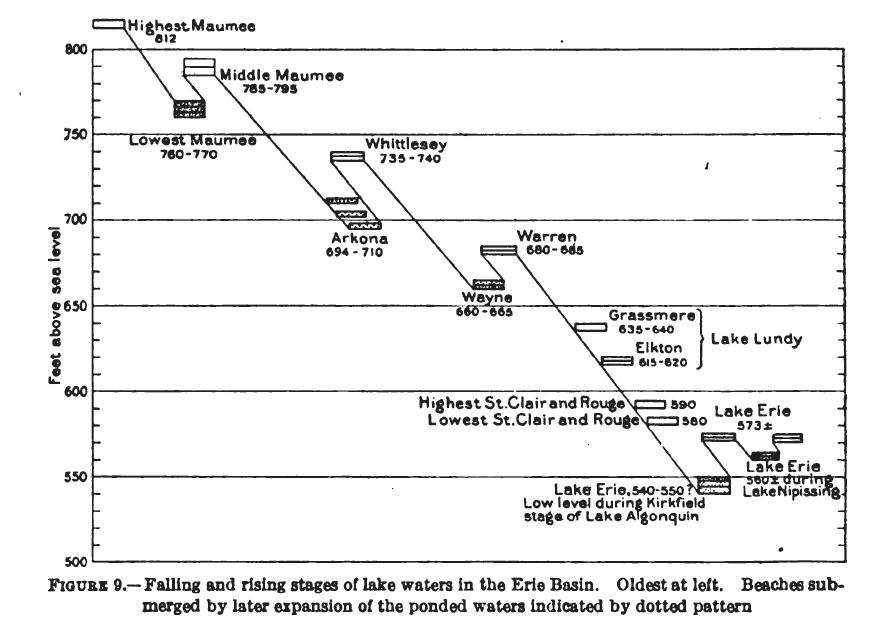
Summary of prehistoric beaches from the six glacial lakes that preceded the modern Lake Erie.

Some prominent delta deposits, such as those on Huron River just east of Ypsilanti, on Rouge River at Plymouth, and on Clinton River below Rochester, belong to Lake Maumee, at its lowest stage. The valleys of incoming rivers had deepened and widened during Lake Arkona. When the ice sheet advanced and the water levels rose, the lower courses of the streams became drowned and were turned into dead-water estuaries. Thus stream deposits would start at the head of these estuaries. Only once they had completely filled the estuary would a Lake Whittlesey delta form. The deltas of Lake Whittlesey are inset and exist within the estuaries general shoreline. Recent erosion during the modern Lake Erie period has deepened these stream beds, removing most of the estuarine deltas. Only fragments remain as gravel terraces along the back areas of the old estuaries. The best remaining terrace is along the Huron River below Ypsilanti.

In New York there is one delta, which is a deposit in Lake Whittlesey. It buries the eastward ends of the Arkona beach ridges a mile or two east of Alden. The river, which built this delta, flowed westward along the front of the ice when the front was on the Alden moraine. It flowed in a valley, which had not been deepened during the time of Lake Arkona, and it is therefore an exception to the inset deltas of Lake Whittlesey. This delta is not large, but its relation to the Arkona beaches establishes the time at which it was built. In Ontario there are three Whittlesey deltas, each larger than any on the American side. One appears on Grand River between Paris and Brantford, another on Thames River between Komoka and London, and another on a large glacial river, which came from the northeast along the ice front and entered the Au Sable Bay of Lake Whittlesey a few miles northwest of Clinton. The first two are inset deltas like those in Michigan. The third, like the one near Alden, New York, was built by a river flowing along the ice border. Another smaller delta, formed, by a river flowing along the ice border, occurs near Guelph, Junction, Ontario. The fourth and only other place where such a delta could occur is occupied by the Ubly outlet in Michigan.

== Correlatives ==
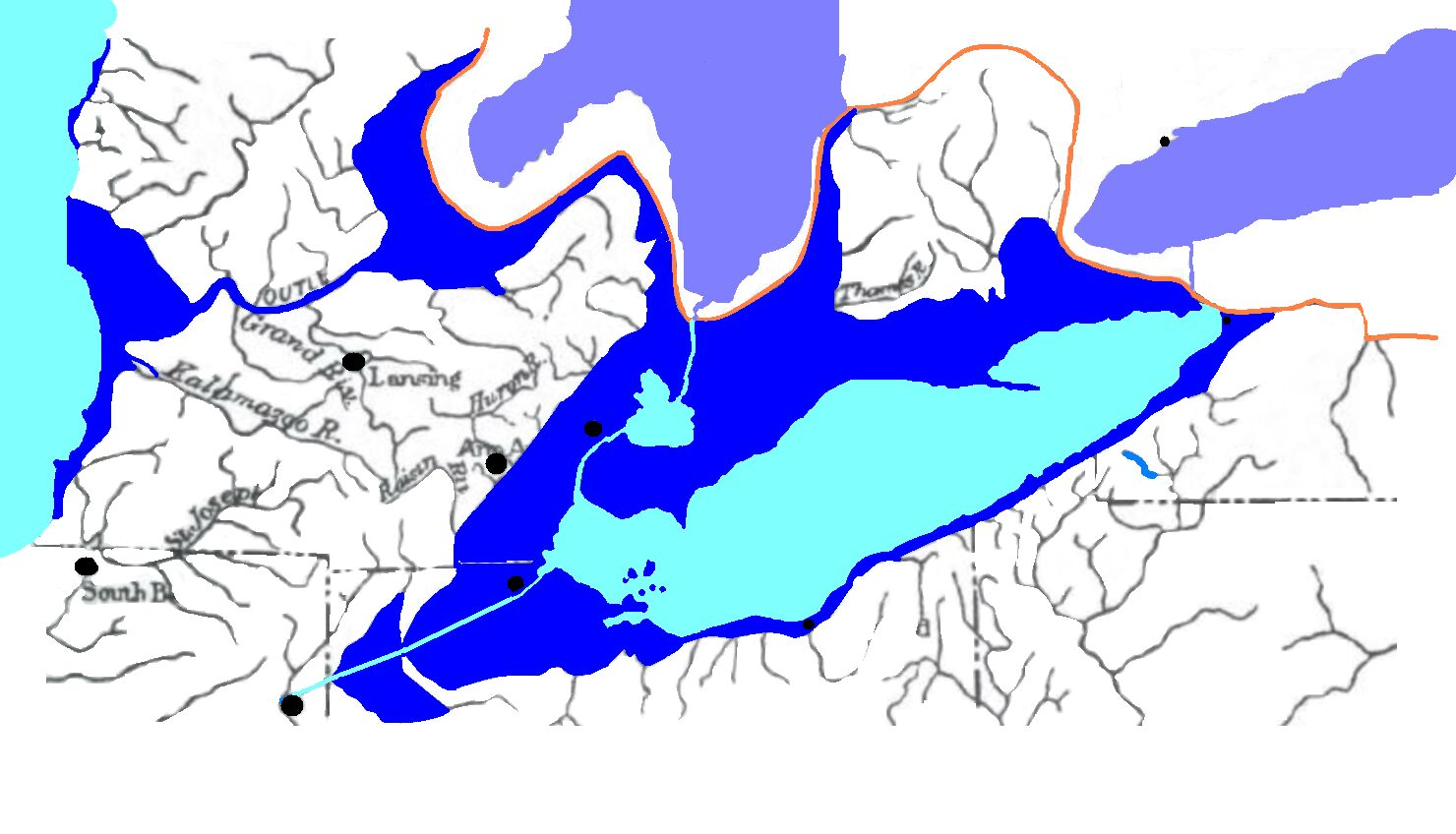
Light blue is modern lakes, dark blue and light blue are the prehistoric lake. Purple is the modern lakebed buried under the ice sheet. Simplified version of USGS (Leverett-Taylor) Map 1908

During the time of Lake Whittlesey Lake Saginaw was an independent lake and after receiving the overflow of Lake Whittlesey it discharged into Lake Chicago, which had then attained hardly half its greatest extent. Two small narrow lakes probably stood in front of the Green Bay ice lobe, but according to Mr. Leverett there was still free drainage and no lakes at the west end of the Lake Superior basin. In New York Fairchild finds Lake Newberry to be the correlative of Lake Whittlesey, but Lake Newberry discharged southward to Susquehanna River. A river of some size entered Lake Whittlesey northeast of Alden, New York, and built a delta which buried the Arkona beaches.

== Transitory to Lake Arkona ==
In falling from the level of Lake Whittlesey to that of Lake Wayne the water level necessarily passed the planes at which it had stood in making the Arkona beaches, and Lake Arkona was temporarily revived. But this relation was transitory and endured for so short a time that no evidence of renewed wave work has been found.

== See also ==
Proglacial lakes of the Lake Erie Basin

- Lake Maumee
- Lake Arkona
- Lake Wayne
- Lake Whittlesey
- Lake Warren
- Lake Grasmere
- Early Lake Algonquin
- Lake Lundy and Dana
- Early Lake Erie
- Lake Erie
