= Lake Arkona =

Lake in Canada

- Location within Ontario
- Location: North America
- Group: Great Lakes
- Coordinates: 42.2°N 81.2°W
- Lake type: former lake
- Etymology: Arkona, Ontario
- Primary inflows: Laurentide Ice Sheet
- Primary outflows: Black River valley in Michigan
- Basin countries: Canada; United States
- First flooded: 12,000 years before present
- Max. length: 241 mi (388 km)
- Max. width: 57 mi (92 km)
- Residence time: 200 years in existence
- Surface elevation: 710 ft (216 m)
- References: Lewis CFM, Cameron GDM, Anderson TW, Heil CW Jr, Gareau PL. 2012. Lake levels in the Erie Basin of the Laurentian Great Lakes. Journal of Paleolimnology 47:493-511.

Lake Arkona was a stage of the lake waters in the Huron-Erie-Ontario basin following the end of the Lake Maumee levels and before the Lake Whittlesey stages, named for Arkona, Ontario, about 50 miles (80 km) east of Sarnia.

== Beaches ==
The ice sheet had withdrawn north of the "thumb" of Michigan, then advanced southward, raising water levels to the east of the "thumb", but not those to the west. This created four distinct areas around Lake Arkona:

1. In the Saginaw basin, where the Arkona beaches were neither submerged nor modified;
2. The area on the "thumb", where the beaches were overridden by the ice and destroyed;
3. The Black River valley, where the beaches were submerged but protected from modification; and
4. The area, which would be Lake Whittlesey, where the beaches were submerged and modified by storm waves.

=== Modified beaches ===
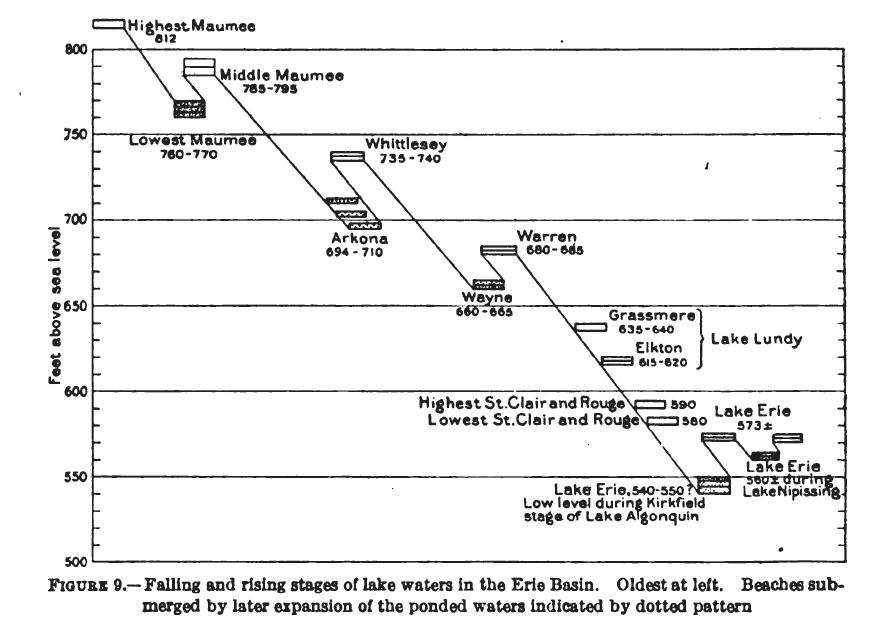
Summary of prehistoric beaches from the six glacial lakes that preceded the modern Lake Erie

From Spring Hill and Zion to the Ohio state line in southeastern Lenawee County, the three Arkona beaches are faint and hard to trace. The same character continues throughout Ohio and Pennsylvania and western New York. Between Spring Hill and the Ohio state line the Arkona beaches do not show the characteristics normal to those in the Saginaw and Black River valleys. The beaches appear as ill-defined gravel or gravelly soil. In the first belt is the faintest, the second is slightly stronger, and the third is the strongest.

==== Texture ====
The most peculiar characteristic of the gravel belts is their stiff clay. The soil of these gravel belts is very stiff and forms clods. They are continuous for miles, maintaining a constant level, and then merge into a single set of ridges in the Black River valley. Unlike most beaches of sand, the remains of the Arkona beaches are only the base structure, which are heavily impregnated with clay. Except for their consistent elevation, they would not have been identified as beach remnants. The Arkona beaches have been heavily modified by wave actions and the emergence of Lake Whittlesey. Initially, Lake Whittlesey's waves began the process of washing the top portion of the Arkona beaches away. Then, the depth of the lake grew and water currents along the bottom of the lake moved the larger gravels up slope to become part of the Lake Whittlesey beaches. Then a period of deep quiet water allowed fine clays to leave suspension and be deposited among the remaining gravel.

==== Distribution ====
As far south as Lenox the three Arkona gravel belts are distinct. Beyond, there are a few intervals in which only two are discernible. Still farther southwest the first and second ridges draw closer together and the vertical interval between them diminishes until it is often difficult to distinguish the two. The three ridges are distinguishable some distance beyond Britton, where the upper two are of very nearly the same height. The same occurrence of three beaches was noted in the Saginaw basin between Flushing and Cass City, but west of Flushing only two beaches appear. In the Saginaw basin the Arkona beaches were not submerged, but they were uplifted. The full strength of the Arkona beach ridges near Cass City and Croswell makes it clear that the ice barrier stood at least 25 miles north, enough distance to allow a heavy on shore surf.

== Correlatives ==
Lake Chicago was nearing its maximum at the time of Lake Arkona. In the Superior basin the ice sheet still covered the entire area. In New York the Finger Lakes had united with Lake Arkona with the exception of possibly the most easterly lakes. The Lake Arkona water levels were close to the level of the First Lake Saginaw, and when the ice sheet retreated north from Lake Maumee, the merger of Maumee with Saginaw gave rise to Lake Arkona. Later the Laurentian ice sheet expanded southward to the Port Huron morainic system. The lake waters to the east and south began to rise by 30 feet (9.1 m) above the Arkona beaches, becoming Lake Whittlesey and the western area once again became Later Lake Saginaw.. This rise in the lake waters caused the obliteration of most of the Arkona beaches as described above. In some places the Arkona beaches stand by the outer border of the Port Huron morainic system.

== See also ==
Proglacial lakes of the Lake Erie Basin

- Lake Maumee
- Lake Arkona
- Lake Wayne
- Lake Warren
- Lake Whittlesey
- Lake Grasmere
- Early Lake Algonquin
- Lake Lundy and Dana
- Early Lake Erie
- Lake Erie

General background

- Proglacial lakes
- List of prehistoric lakes
- Great Lakes
