= Lake Wayne =

Pro-glacial lake

- Location within Michigan
- Location: North America
- Group: Great Lakes
- Coordinates: 42.2396°N 83.2909°W
- Lake type: former lake
- Etymology: Wayne County, Michigan
- Primary inflows: Laurentide Ice Sheet
- Primary outflows: Mohawk River
- Basin countries: Canada; United States
- First flooded: 12,500 years before present
- Max. length: 241 mi (388 km)
- Max. width: 57 mi (92 km)
- Residence time: 500 years in existence
- Surface elevation: 476 ft (145 m)
- References: Lewis CFM, Cameron GDM, Anderson TW, Heil CW Jr, Gareau PL. 2012. Lake levels in the Erie Basin of the Laurentian Great Lakes. Journal of Paleolimnology 47:493-511.

Lake Wayne formed in the Lake Erie and Lake St. Clair basins around 12,500 years before present (YBP) when Lake Arkona dropped in elevation. About 20 feet (6.1 m) below the Lake Warren beaches it was early described as a lower Lake Warren level. Based on work in Wayne County, near the village of Wayne evidence was found that Lake Wayne succeeded Lake Whittlesey and preceded Lake Warren. From the Saginaw Basin the lake did not discharge water through Grand River but eastward along the edge of the ice sheet to Syracuse, New York, thence into the Mohawk valley. This shift in outlets warranted a separate from Lake Warren. The Wayne beach lies but a short distance inside the limits of the Warren beach. Its character is not greatly different when taken throughout its length in Michigan, Ohio, Pennsylvania and New York. At the type locality in Wayne County, Michigan, it is a sandy ridge, but farther north, and to the east through Ohio it is gravel. The results of the isostatic rebound area similar to the Lake Warren beaches.

== History ==
The Wayne beach is below the level of the Lake Warren beach. It appears to be the older, for it shows evidence of submergence and modification. The Wayne beach was submerged and modified during Lake Warren. The lowest stage of Lake Wayne may have coincided with the earliest stages of Lake Algonquin

== Outlet ==
Lake Wayne was correlated with the Two Creeks Interstade and with eastward drainage into the Hudson River. Field studies in western New York are inconclusive. Based on studies of the Buffalo Moraine, the Alden Moraine, and the Niagara Falls Moraine it is believed that a local series of rapid glacial melting led to sand and gravel deposition, followed by an advance of the ice sheet. Because subdued pebble beach ridges, the Wayne Lake may have persisted until the ice margin had retreated north to near the Niagara Falls Moraine. This would raise the lake level to form the Warren III lake.

== Beach ==
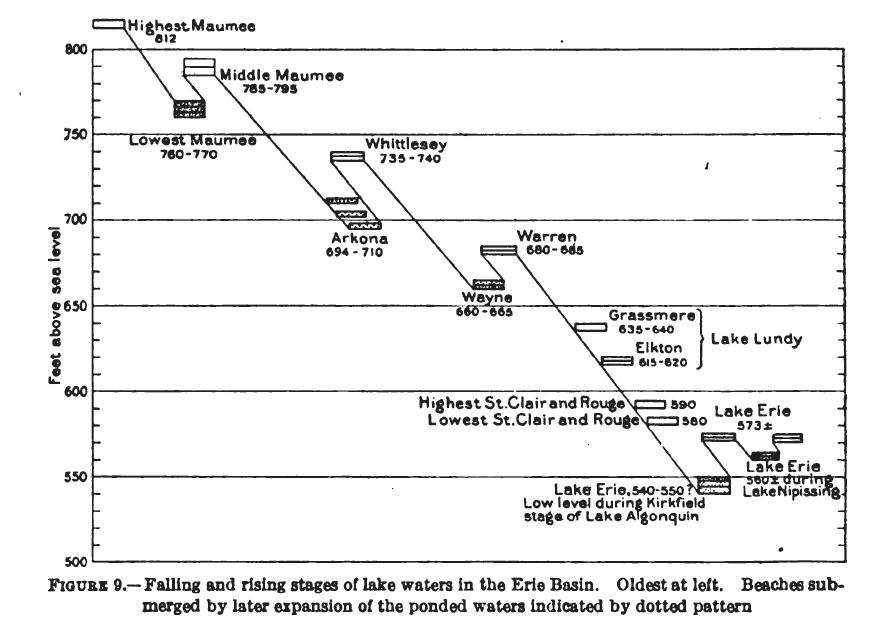
Summary of prehistoric beaches from the six glacial lakes that preceded the modern Lake Erie.

From the Ohio-Michigan line on the Black River to Port Huron the beach is very identifiable. It is composed of fine, partly wind-blown sand or is buried. The beach enters Michigan 2 or 3 miles (3.2 or 4.8 km) northeast of Sylvania, Ohio. Here, it is a broad, sandy belt, about 6 miles (9.7 km) wide. The beach slightly above the 660 feet (200 m). The belt is mostly areas of dunes with swampy hollows. It includes a delta at the Huron River near Romulus. near Wayne it is composed of sandy gravel 15 to 20 rods (75 to 101 m)wide and standing 10 to 12 feet (3.0 to 3.7 m) above the plain to the east of 5 to 6 feet (1.5 to 1.8 m) above the western plain.

== See also ==
Proglacial lakes of the Lake Erie Basin

- Lake Maumee
- Lake Arkona
- Lake Whittlesey
- Lake Warren
- Lake Algonquin
- Early Lake Erie
