= Lake Warren =

Former proglacial lake in North America

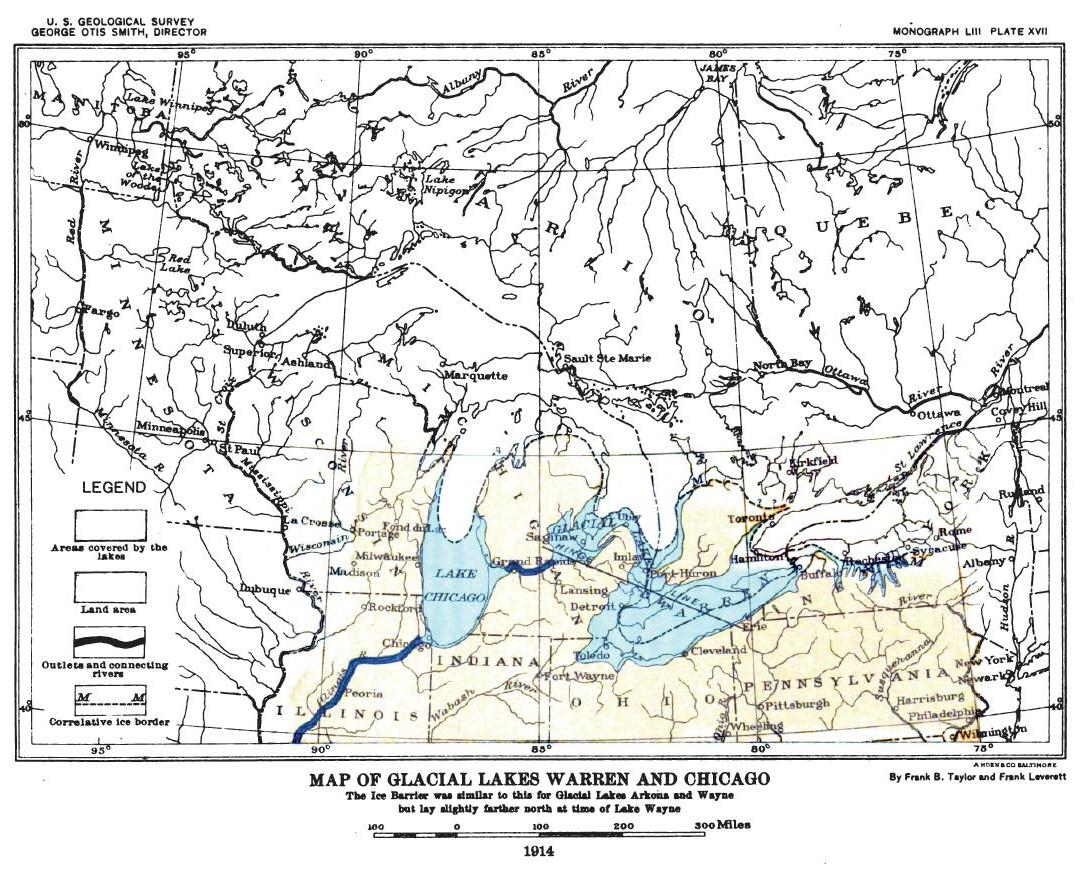
- Map of Glacial Lakes Warren and Chicago (USGS 1915)

- Location within Ontario Location within Ohio
- Location: North America
- Group: Great Lakes
- Coordinates: 42.2°N 81.2°W
- Lake type: former lake
- Etymology: Warren Upham
- Primary inflows: Laurentide Ice Sheet
- Primary outflows: Mohawk River
- Basin countries: Canada; United States
- First flooded: 12,700 years before present
- Max. length: 290 mi (470 km)
- Max. width: 110 mi (180 km)
- Residence time: 200 years in existence
- Surface elevation: 690 ft (210 m); 680 ft (207 m); 675 ft (206 m)
- References: Lewis CFM, Cameron GDM, Anderson TW, Heil CW Jr, Gareau PL. 2012. Lake levels in the Erie Basin of the Laurentian Great Lakes. Journal of Paleolimnology 47:493-511.

Lake Warren was a proglacial lake that formed in the Lake Erie basin around 12,700 years before present (YBP) when Lake Whittlesey dropped in elevation. Lake Warren is divided into three stages: Warren I 690 feet (210 m), Warren II 680 feet (210 m), and Warren III 675 feet (206 m), each defined by the relative elevation above sea level.

== Origin ==
Lake Warren followed Lake Wayne. It covered the basin of Lake Erie, part of Lake Huron, including Saginaw Bay and the lowland, which separates Lake Huron from Lake Erie. It included a part of the Lake Ontario basin and the lowland between Lakes Ontario and Erie. Lake Warren included the Saginaw basin and the Huron-Erie basin. Its outlet was through the Grand River to Lake Chicago. The beach stands at 680 feet (210 m) above sea level west of the hinge line, unaffected by the isostatic rebound. It is marginally above the outlet, at 670 feet (200 m). Lake Warren was preceded by a lower stage, which had its outlet through the Mohawk valley. Lake Warren came into existence when its waters were raised from Lake Wayne by an advancing ice front. The ice both compacted the area where the melt water could be held, raising the water level, while blocking the lower outlet from Lake Wayne.

== Size ==
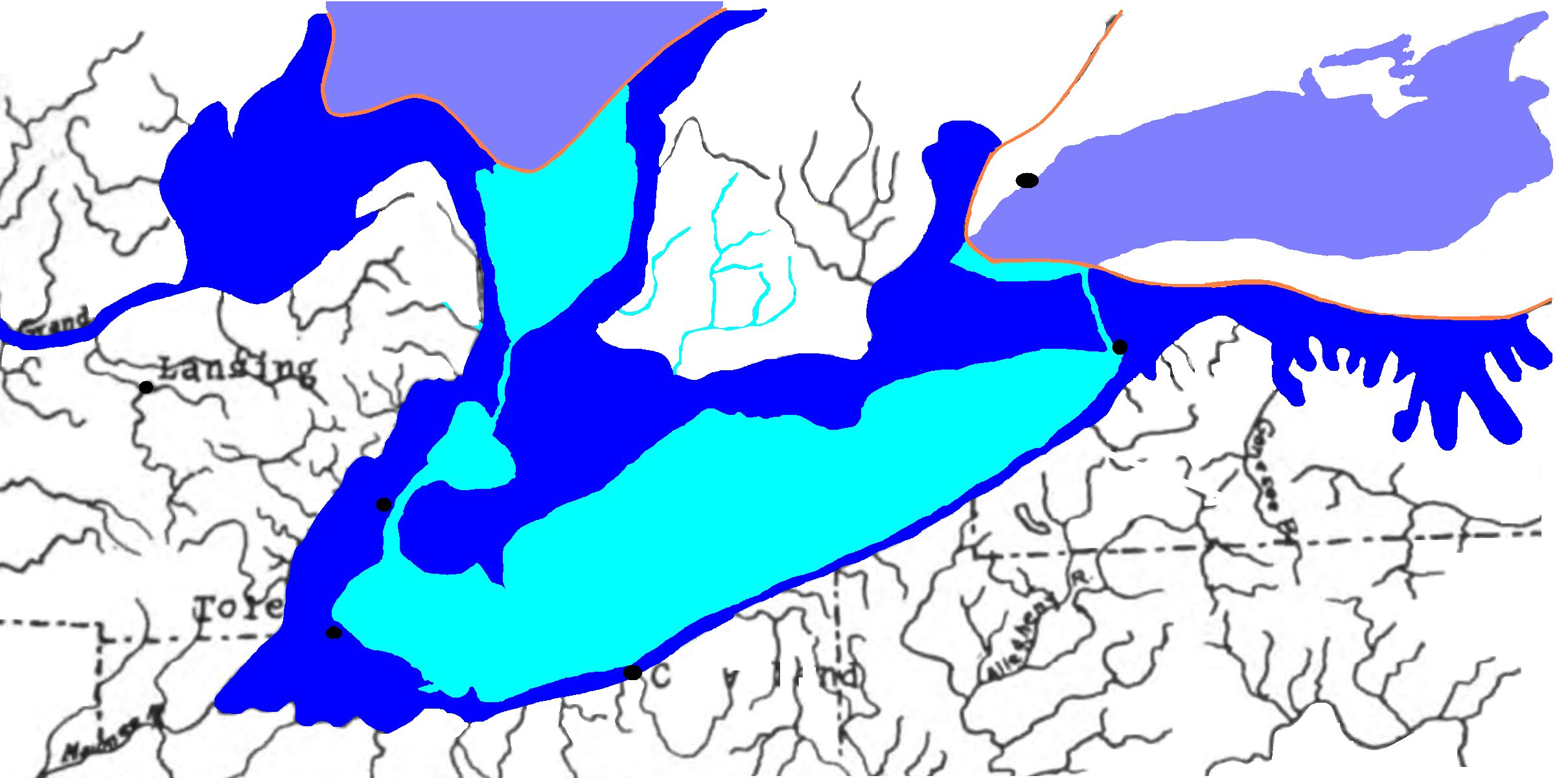
Light blue is modern lakes, dark blue and light blue are the prehistoric lake. Purple is the modern lakebed buried under the ice sheet. Simplified version of USGS (Leverett-Taylor) Map 1908

Lake Warren was about half the size of the present day Lake Erie, lying in the southern half of the basin.

== Beach ==
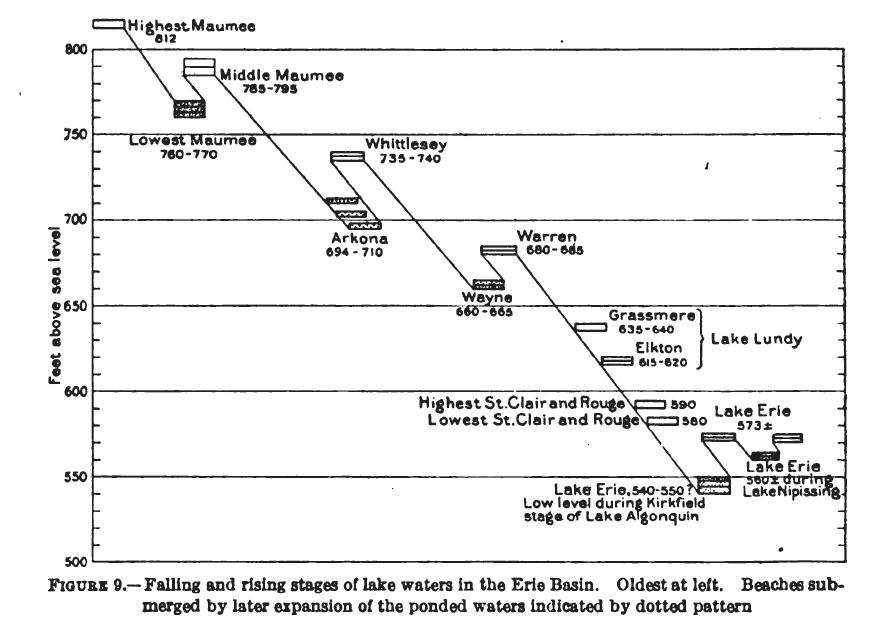
Summary of prehistoric beaches from the six glacial lakes that preceded the modern Lake Erie.

The beach rises to the north of the Grand River outlet at 2 feet (0.61 m) per mile until it reaches 800 feet (240 m) near Gladwin. It is also nearly 800 feet (240 m) on the point of the "Thumb" in Huron county north of Bad Axe. The beach is horizontal from Lenox, in St. Clair county, around the west end of Lake Erie, then along the south shore through Ohio to the Pennsylvania line, a distance of 300 miles (480 km). Between there and Batavia, New York, it rises 200 feet (61 m) in the next 150 miles (240 km).

The beach marks a lake level which lasted a considerable period of time, shorter than either the Arkona or the Lake Whittlesey durations. The delta deposits are not as extensive as Lake Arkona. Its shore deposits vary, where the lakebed was till or gravelly material, a gravelly beach was formed. Where the lakebed was sandy it is a sandy ridge.

== Lakes Warren and Wayne ==
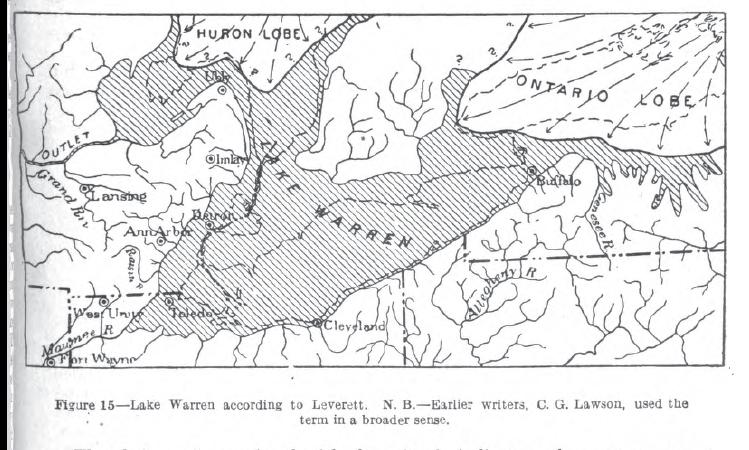
Map of Lake Warren in the Lake Huron and Lake Erie Basins

The relatively strong but discontinuous multiple sand and gravel beach ridges occurring as close as 40 feet and as much as 100 feet below the Whittlesey strand line in western New York (between 750 and 865 feet (229 and 264 m) are correlated with Glacial Lake Warren. These ridges occur at the foot of the Allegheny Plateau. They are frequently associated with deltas. The ridges are well developed in a few areas well beyond the Plateau in the Lakes Erie and Ontario lowlands. In many cases, the ridges and deltas are underlain by silts of Lake Whittlesey lakebed.

== See also ==
Proglacial lakes of the Lake Erie Basin

- Lake Maumee
- Lake Arkona
- Lake Wayne
- Lake Whittlesey
- Lake Warren
- Lake Grassmere
- Early Lake Algonquin
- Lake Lundy and Dana
- Early Lake Erie
- Lake Erie
