= Wallace Farm (Cuyahoga Valley National Park) =

- U.S. National Register of Historic Places
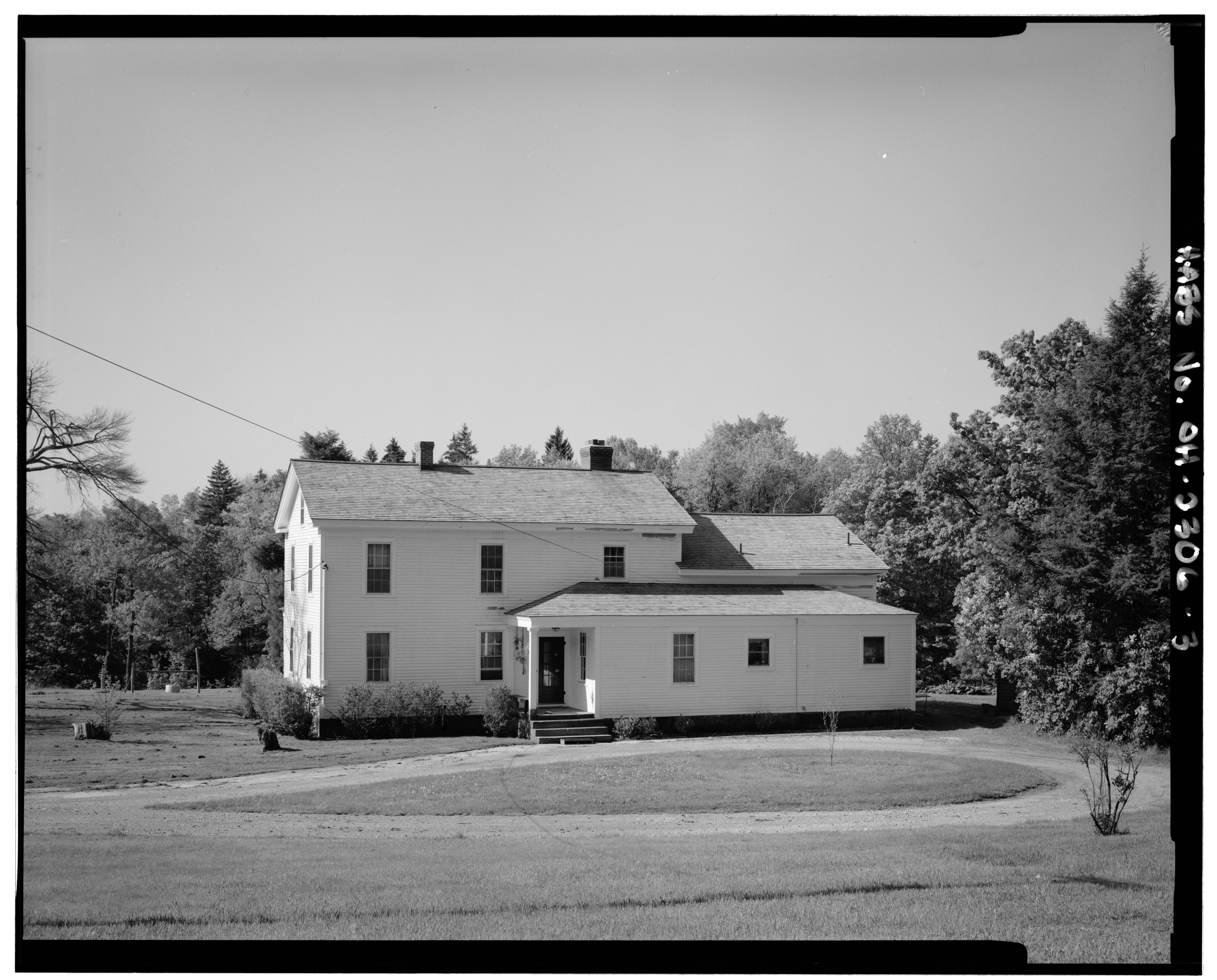
- James Wallace House

- Location within Ohio
- Location: 8230 Brandywine Rd., Northfield Center Township, Ohio
- Coordinates: 41°16′40″N 81°32′26″W
- Area: 45.5 acres (18.4 ha)
- Built: 1850
- Architectural style: Greek Revival
- NRHP reference No.: 85001387
- Added to NRHP: June 27, 1985

The Wallace Farm is a historic farm within Cuyahoga Valley National Park in Summit County, Ohio. The property overlooks Brandywine Falls, a 63 feet (19 m) waterfall on Brandywine Creek. Land speculator and sawyer George Wallace settled on the land with his family in the 1810s; Wallace helped found the nearby village of Brandywine and became its first postmaster in 1825. His sons James and George Y. Wallace began farming on the land in the 1830s, though George Y. died in the 1840s. James built a farmhouse and barn on the farm circa 1850, both of which are still standing. The farmhouse has a Greek Revival design with a gable roof and six-over-six double-hung sash windows. The farm also includes a twentieth-century concrete workshop, the ruins of the sawmill, and several building foundations.

The farm was added to the National Register of Historic Places on June 27, 1985. The farmhouse currently operates as a bed and breakfast called the Inn at Brandywine Falls.
