= Nordonia High School =

Coordinates: 41.302301°N 81.510460°W

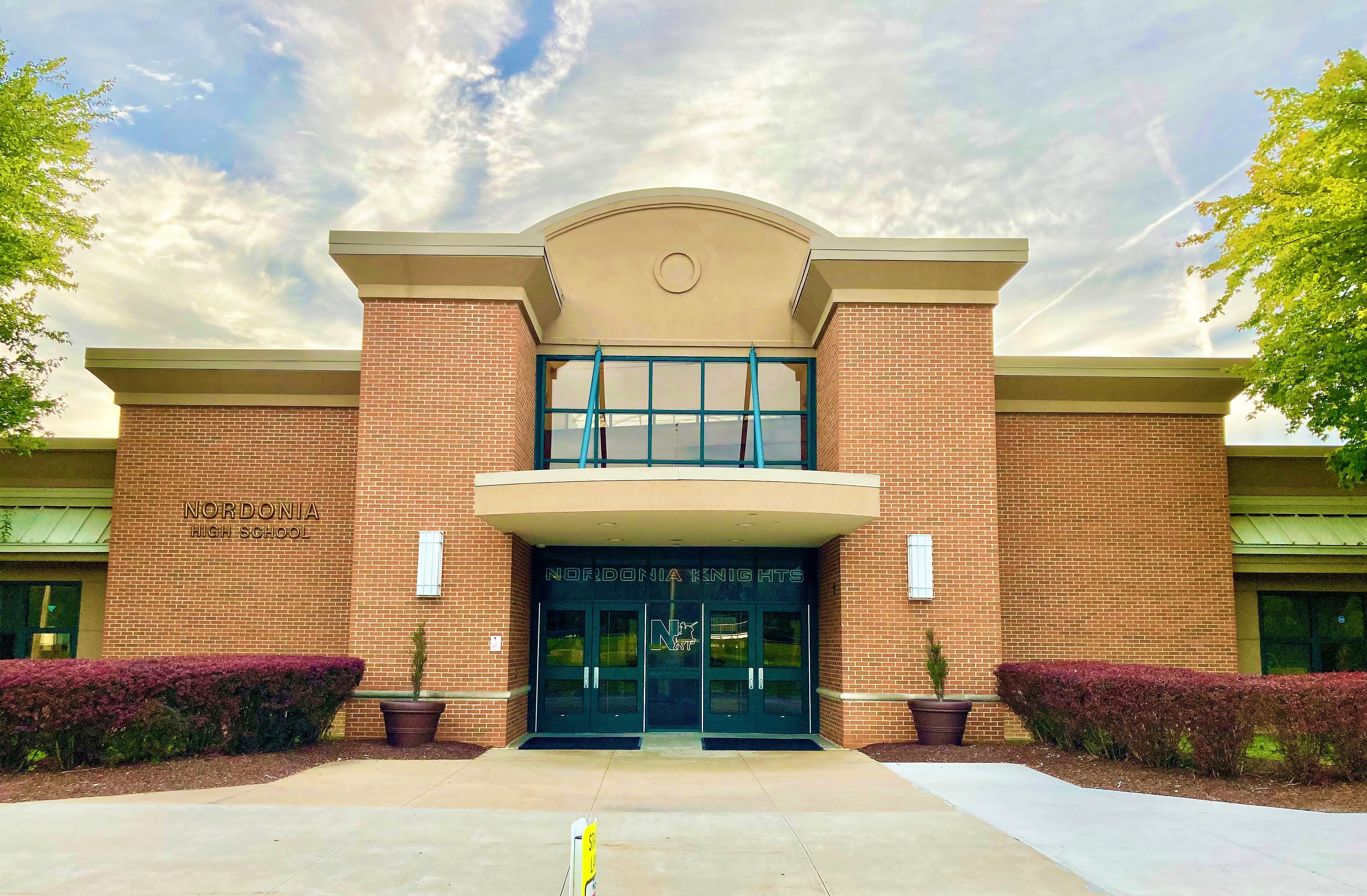

Location
- 8006 South Bedford Road; Macedonia, Summit County, Ohio 44056; United States

Information
- Type: Public
- Motto: Inspiring Every Student to Value Learning, Community and Excellence
- Established: 1961
- School district: Nordonia Hills City School District
- Superintendent: Casey Wright
- Principal: Jessica Archer
- Staff: 75.51 (FTE)
- Grades: 9–12
- Enrollment: 1,255 (2023–2024)
- Student to teacher ratio: 16.62
- Colors: Green, white, and black
- Athletics conference: Suburban League
- Mascot: Knight
- Website: www.nordoniaschools.org

Nordonia High School is a public high school in Macedonia, Ohio. It is the only high school in the Nordonia Hills City School District. Their mascot is a knight. There are approximately 1,300+ students currently enrolled in the high school. The colors of the school are green, black, and white. Formerly of the Northeast Ohio Conference (NOC), Nordonia athletic teams now compete in the Suburban League.

== Overview ==
The school is the only high school in the Nordonia Hills City School District, which is located in northern Summit County, in between the cities of Akron and Cleveland. The district name is a portmanteau from the communities it primarily serves: Northfield and Northfield Center, Macedonia, and Sagamore Hills. The district also includes the northwestern section of adjacent Boston Heights.

== Athletics ==
=== State championships ===
- Boys wrestling – 1977
- Girls bowling – 2023
- Girls flag football – 2026

== Notable alumni ==
- Mark Foster, musician and lead singer for the indie pop band Foster the People
- Kevin Kowalski, professional football player in the National Football League (NFL)
- Dylan Mabin, NFL player
- Jordan Mabin, NFL player
- Ron Sega, NASA astronaut and administrator
- Kryss Shane, LGBT+ expert and author
- Rob Sims, NFL player
- Jason Trusnik, NFL player
- Denzel Ward, NFL player
- Neil Zaza, guitarist and record producer
