= Nordonia Hills City School District =

School district in Ohio

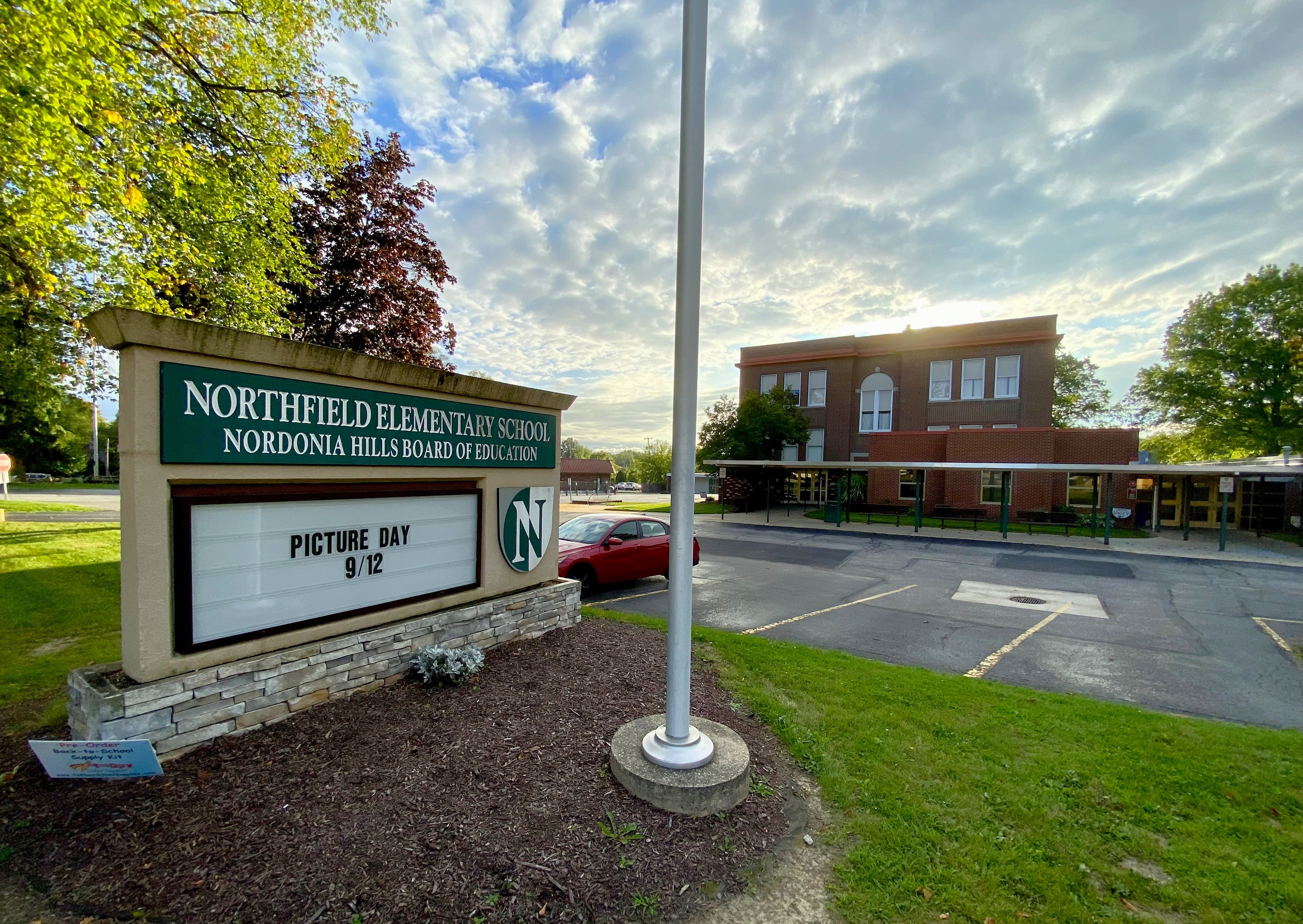

Location
- Summit County, Ohio; United States

District information
- Type: Public
- Grades: K–12
- Superintendent: Casey Wright
- School board: Liz McKinley, Jason Tidmore, Chad Lahrmer, Sandra Caramela-Miller, Matt Ford
- Budget: $52.291 million
- NCES District ID: 3905004

Students and staff
- Enrollment: 3,454
- Teachers: 208.81 (FTE)
- Student–teacher ratio: 16.54:1
- District mascot: Knights

Other information
- Website: https://www.nordoniaschools.org

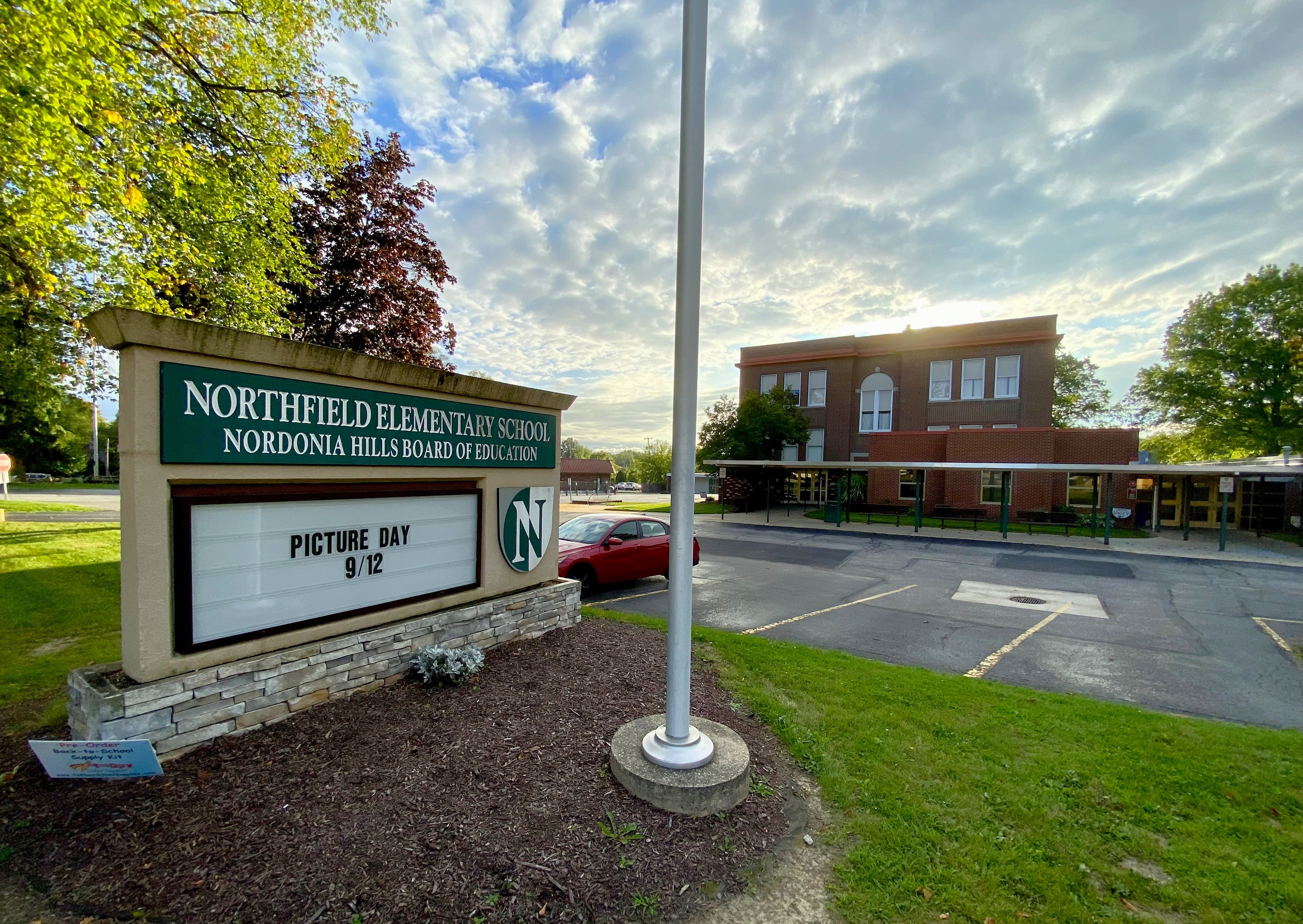

Nordonia Hills City School District is a school district that serves Northfield Village, Northfield Center, Sagamore Hills, Macedonia, and portions of Boston Heights in northern Summit County, Ohio. The football team of Nordonia High School is the Nordonia Knights. Nordonia Hills is a portmanteau taken from Northfield, Macedonia, and Sagamore Hills. There are 6 schools in the district: Northfield Elementary, Rushwood Elementary (built in 1970), Ledgeview Elementary, Lee Eaton Elementary, Nordonia Middle School, and Nordonia High School.

== District Enrollment Figures (K-12) ==
1965	1970	1974	1980	1985	1990	1995	2000	2005	2010	2015	2019	2020	2023
4,199	4,927	5,618	4,552	3,390	2,917	3,153	3,642	3,768	4,013	3,692	3,600	3,596	3,437

== Board of Education & Administration ==
Board of Education:

- Liz McKinley: President
- Jason Tidmore: Vice President
- Chad Lahrmer: Member
- Sandra Caramela-Miller: Member
- Matt Ford: Member

Administration:

- Casey Wright: Superintendent
- Kyle Kiffer: Treasurer/Chief Financial Officer
- Todd Stuart: Director of Business
- Shon Smith: Director of Educational Services
- Carol Tonsing: Director of Curriculum & Instruction
- Carrie Hutchinson: Director of Pupil Services
- Mike Russ: Director of Technology

== Schools ==
Ledgeview Elementary School

Location
- 9130 Shepard Road; Macedonia, Summit County, Ohio 44056; United States

Information
- Type: Public
- Established: 1963
- Principal: Kristen Cottrell
- Staff: 24.33 (FTE)
- Grades: K–4
- Enrollment: 476 (2023–24)
- Student to teacher ratio: 17.71
- Website: www.nordoniaschools.org/ledgeviewelementary_home.aspx

Rushwood Elementary School

Location
- 8200 Rushwood Lane; Northfield, Summit County, Ohio 44067; United States

Information
- Type: Public
- Established: 1970
- Principal: Ashley Turner
- Staff: 19.23 (FTE)
- Grades: K–4
- Enrollment: 330 (2023–24)
- Student to teacher ratio: 17.16
- Website: www.nordoniaschools.org/rushwoodelementary_home.aspx

Northfield Elementary School

Location
- 9370 Olde Eight Road; Northfield, Summit County, Ohio 44067; United States

Information
- Type: Public
- Established: 1871
- Principal: Marc Kaminicki
- Staff: 22.33 (FTE)
- Grades: K–4
- Enrollment: 367 (2023–24)
- Student to teacher ratio: 16.44
- Website: www.nordoniaschools.org/northfieldelementary_home.aspx

Lee Eaton Intermediate School

Location
- 115 Ledge Road; Northfield, Summit County, Ohio 44067; United States

Information
- Type: Public
- Established: February 23, 1955
- Principal: Bryan Rudowsky
- Associate Principal: Rebecca Taylor-Mitchell
- Staff: 27.10 (FTE)
- Grades: 5–6
- Enrollment: 522 (2023–24)
- Student to teacher ratio: 19.26
- Website: www.nordoniaschools.org/leeeatonelementary_home.aspx

Nordonia Middle School

Location
- 73 Leonard Ave; Northfield, Summit County, Ohio 44067; United States

Information
- Type: Public
- Established: 1928
- Principal: Bryan Seward
- Associate Principal: Ronald Wiggins
- Staff: 22.33 (FTE)
- Grades: 7–8
- Enrollment: 507 (2023–24)
- Student to teacher ratio: 12.68
- Website: www.nordoniaschools.org/nordoniamiddleschool_home.aspx

Nordonia High School

Location
- 8006 S Bedford Rd; Macedonia, Summit County, Ohio 44056; United States

Information
- Type: Public
- Established: 1961
- Principal: Jessica Archer
- Associate Principal (A-I): Shannon Conley-Kurjian
- Associate Principal (J-R): Anthony Buckler
- Co-Deans of Students (S-Z): Ranzy Lardell, Avni Uppal
- Staff: 75.51 (FTE)
- Grades: 9–12
- Enrollment: 1,255 (2023–24)
- Student to teacher ratio: 16.62
- Website: www.nordoniaschools.org/nordoniahighschool_home.aspx
