= Brandywine Creek (Cuyahoga River tributary) =

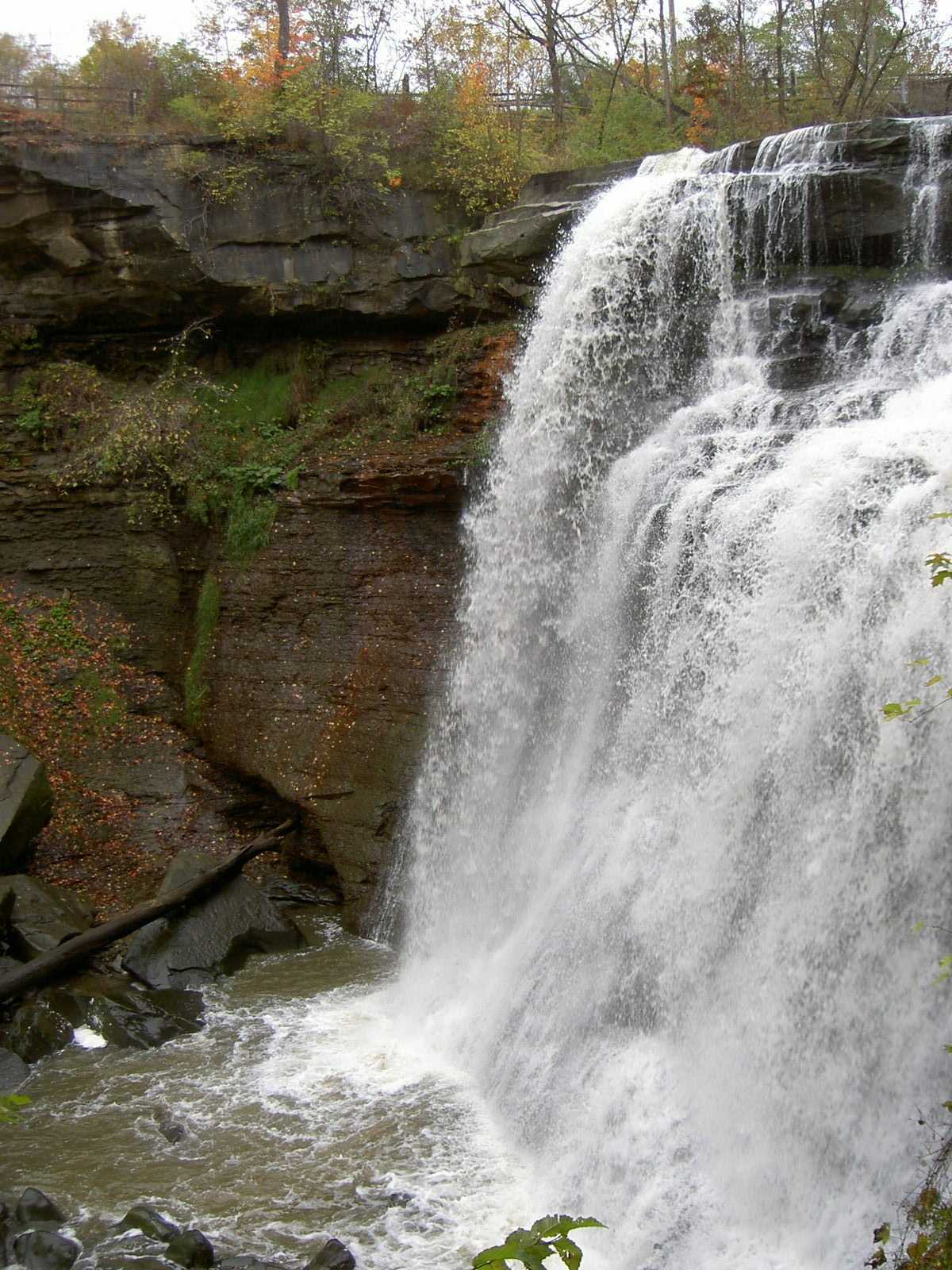
- Brandywine Falls of Brandywine Creek in Summit County, Ohio

Location
- Country: United States of America

Physical characteristics
- Source
  - coordinates: 41°17′33″N 81°27′48″W
  - elevation: 1,165 ft (355 m)
- Mouth
  - location: Cuyahoga River
  - coordinates: 41°17′10″N 81°33′50″W
  - elevation: 636 ft (194 m)

Brandywine Creek is a tributary of the Cuyahoga River that is partly contained in Cuyahoga Valley National Park in Ohio.

== Watershed ==
The river runs into the Cuyahoga River in Sagamore Hills Township near the now-abandoned Jaite Paper Mill. Discharge volume is extremely seasonal, usually a few cubic feet per second, and peaking at several hundred cubic feet per second under flood conditions.

The Brandywine Creek watershed begins in the northern portion of Hudson, and includes the cities of Hudson, Macedonia and Twinsburg, and the townships of Boston, Sagamore Hills, and Northfield Center.

== Brandywine Falls ==
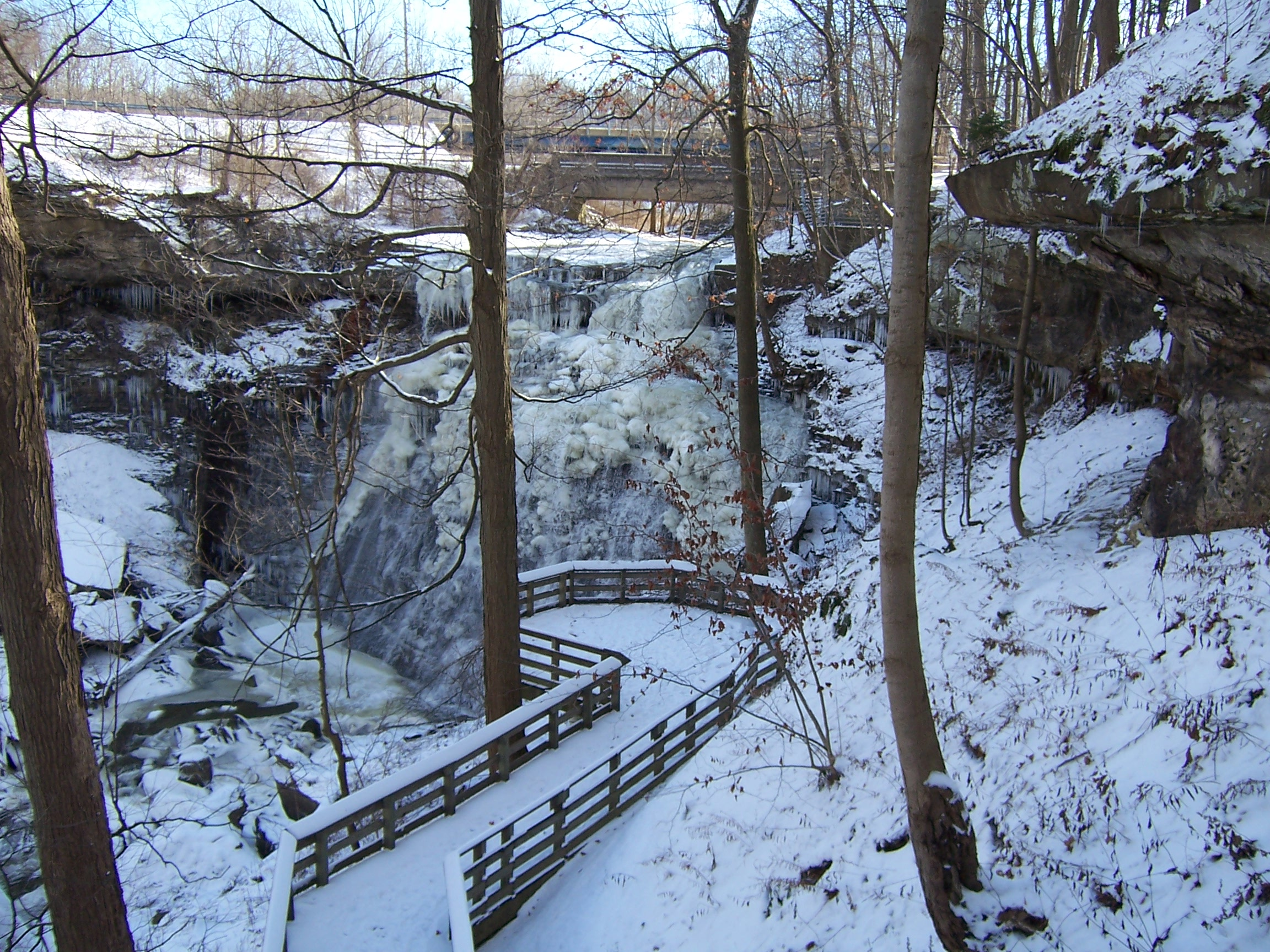
A wooden elevated path leading down to Brandywine Falls

Brandywine Falls, 65 feet (19.8 m) high, at 41°16′37″N 81°32′17″W, Elevation: 814 feet (248.1 m) within Cuyahoga Valley National Park, is Ohio State Route 82 and Olde Eight in Sagamore Hills, Ohio. The falls can be accessed via the Brandywine Gorge Trail, a 1.5-mile (2.4 km) hiking trail.

=== Rock layers ===
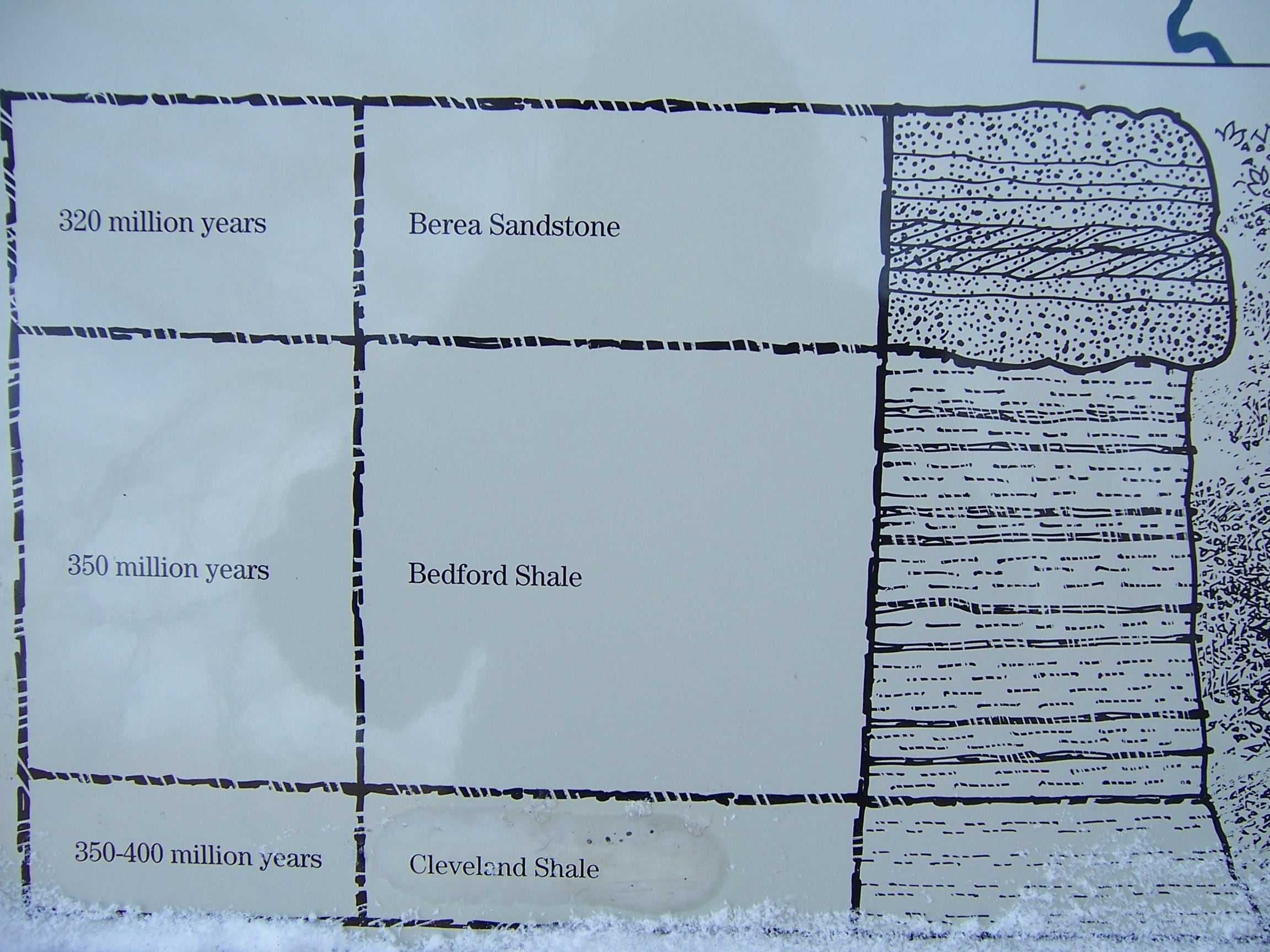
An exhibit near the falls includes a photo of the waterfalls, a map of the area, and a cross-sectional drawing of the rock with: * Berea sandstone (320 million years), * Bedford Shale (350 million years), and * Cleveland Shale (350 - 400 million years)

The rock layers of the 60-foot (18 m) Brandywine Falls can be read like a book. Each chapter covers millions of years, as ancient seas left behind sediments that were compressed by added layers. The rocks here at the base of the falls were formed more than 400 million years ago.

Brandywine Creek and the "bridal veil" cascades began about 10,000 years ago after the last glacial retreat. The falls have now exposed the harder, yellow-brown Berea sandstone looming over the softer, deep red Bedford Shale. Since sandstone is more resistant to erosion, the shale below is frequently undercut. As these layers wear away, the story of the earth continues to be revealed.

== Village of Brandywine ==
Brandywine Falls was the site of the Village of Brandywine.

== See also ==
- List of rivers of Ohio
- List of waterfalls
