= Jordan Mabin =

American gridiron football player (born 1988)

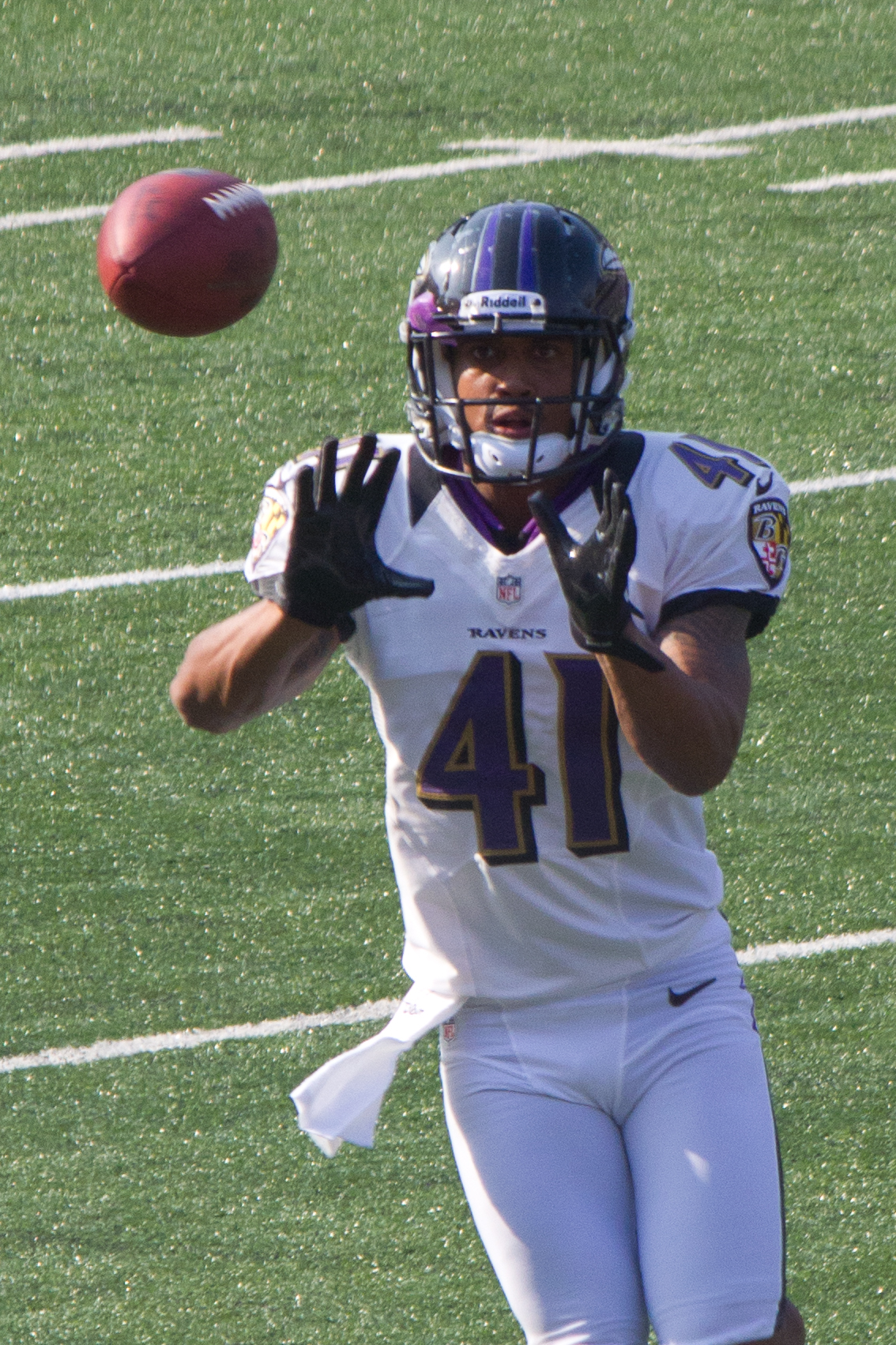
- Jordan Mabin at Ravens M&T Bank Stadium practice in August 2012

No. 41
- Position: Cornerback

Personal information
- Born: October 31, 1988 (age 38); Alameda County, California
- Listed height: 5 ft 11 in (1.80 m)
- Listed weight: 180 lb (82 kg)

Career information
- High school: Nordonia (Macedonia, Ohio)
- College: Northwestern
- NFL draft: 2012: undrafted

Career history
- Baltimore Ravens (2012)*; Montreal Alouettes (2012); Cleveland Browns (2012)*; Montreal Alouettes (2013); Atlanta Falcons (2013–2015)*; San Diego Chargers (2015)*
- * Offseason or practice squad member only

Awards and highlights
- 2008 Freshman All-American (FWAA, TSN, Phil Steele)
- Stats at Pro Football Reference

Jordan Christopher Mabin (born October 31, 1988) is an American former football cornerback. He has been a member of the Cleveland Browns, Baltimore Ravens, Atlanta Falcons, and San Diego Chargers of the National Football League (NFL) as well as the Montreal Alouettes of the Canadian Football League (CFL).

== Early life ==
Mabin attended Nordonia High School in Macedonia, Ohio, where he played both defensive back and running back. Offensively, he rushed for 6,700 career yards, including 2,354 yards his senior year, on 869 attempts (7.7 ypc), which is the sixth-best career mark in Ohio high school history. Defensively, totaled 143 career tackles (123 solos) and 11 interceptions.

Considered a three-star recruit by Rivals.com, Mabin was listed as the No. 27 cornerback prospect in the nation in 2007.

== College career ==
After redshirting his initial year at Northwestern, Mabin started the last 11 games at cornerback for the Wildcats in 2008. He finished with 52 total tackles and three interceptions for the year. Mabin subsequently earned multiple All-Freshman honors, as he was named to FWAA′s Freshman All-America team and Sporting News′ Freshman All-American team.

== Professional career ==
=== Baltimore Ravens ===
Mabin signed with the Baltimore Ravens as an Undrafted Free Agent. Mabin was later released from the Ravens preseason roster cuts on August 26. Then in mid-October he joined the Ravens' practice squad.

=== Montreal Alouettes ===
Was signed to the practice roster of the Montreal Alouettes of the Canadian Football League for two regular season games.

=== Cleveland Browns ===
Mabin signed with the Cleveland Browns on December 26, 2012.

=== Second stint with the Alouettes ===
On March 27, 2013 Mabin signed with the Alouettes

=== Atlanta Falcons ===
On August 1, 2013, Mabin signed with the Atlanta Falcons. He was cut on August 30, 2014. He signed to the practice squad on December 12, 2014. He was released by the Falcons on May 1, 2015.

=== San Diego Chargers ===
On August 4, 2015, the San Diego Chargers signed Mabin after waiving WR Demetrius Wilson. On September 5, 2015, he was waived by the Chargers.
