= Sagamore Hills =

Sagamore Hills can refer to:

- Sagamore Hill, a home of U.S. President Theodore Roosevelt
- Sagamore Hills, a neighborhood of Lansing, Michigan
- Sagamore Hills Township, Summit County, Ohio
