= CCIS =

CCIS may refer to:

- Centennial Centre for Interdisciplinary Science, a building at the University of Alberta
- Cleveland Council of Independent Schools
- Common Channel Interoffice Signaling
- Comprehensive Case Information System, in the Florida justice system
- The College of Computer and Information Science, one of the colleges at Northeastern University in Boston, United States.
