= Brandywine, Ohio =

Unincorporated community in Ohio, U.S.

Brandywine is an unincorporated community in Summit County, in the U.S. state of Ohio.

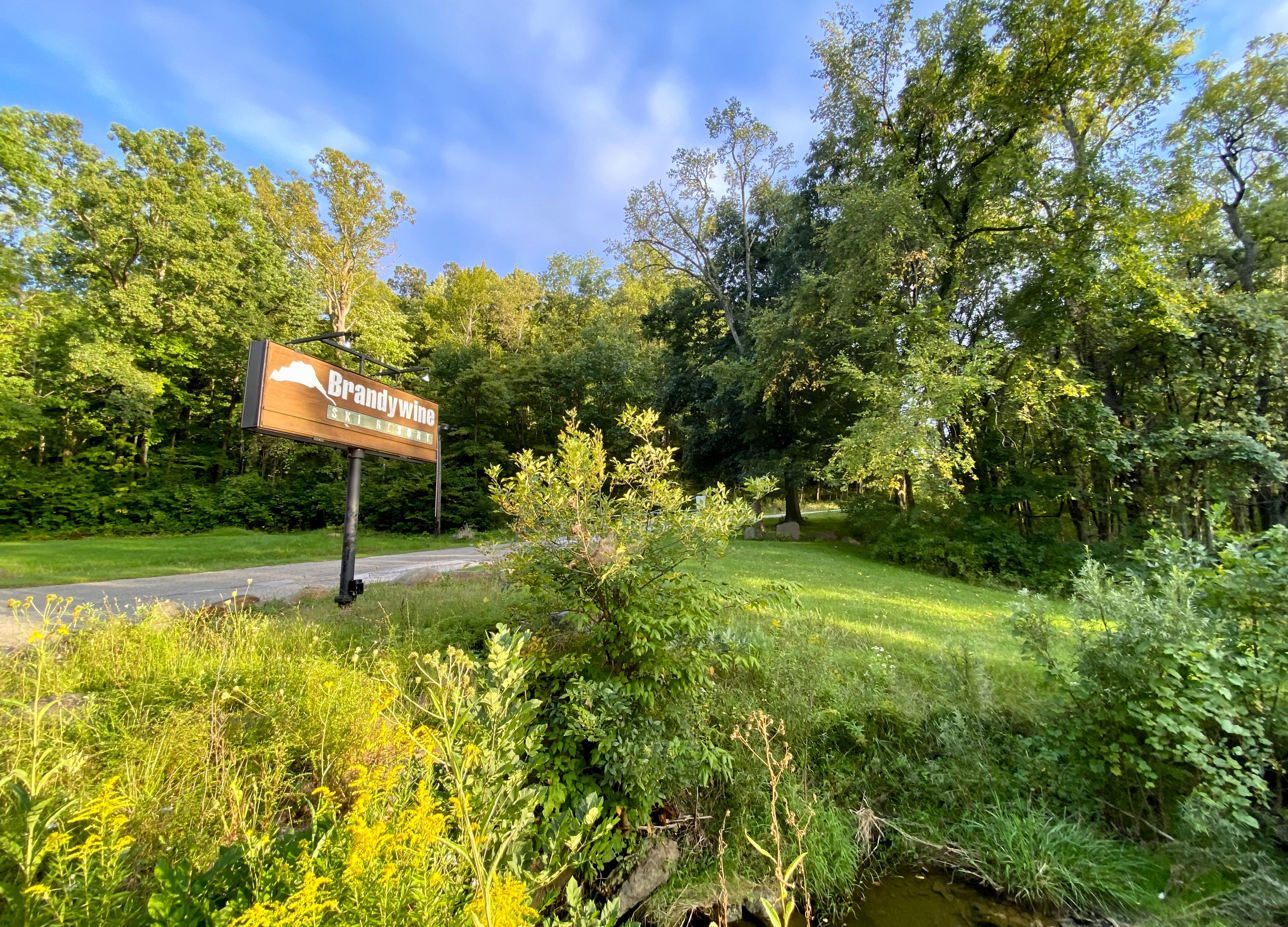
Brandywine Ski Resort

== History ==
A variant name was Brandywine Mills. A post office called Brandywine Mills was established in 1825, and remained in operation until 1855. The community took its name from nearby Brandywine Creek.

=== Brandywine Village ===
Brandywine Village, Ohio
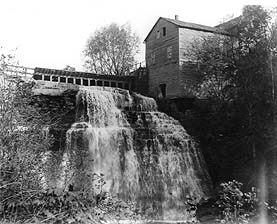
- Brandywine Falls grist mill
- Interactive map of Brandywine Village, Ohio
- Coordinates: 41°16′34″N 81°32′17″W
- Country: United States
- State: Ohio
- County: Summit
- Settled: 1814
- Elevation: 843 ft (257 m)
- Time zone: UTC-5 (Eastern (EST))
  - Summer (DST): UTC-4 (EDT)
- ZIP code: 44067
- Area code: 330
- FIPS code
- GNIS feature ID: 1071111

Brandywine Village, Ohio is a former settlement located near Brandywine Falls. It is within the boundaries of the Cuyahoga Valley National Park. The site lies on the border between Northfield Center Township and Sagamore Hills Township. The Village of Brandywine was first settled in 1814 when George Wallace, taking advantage of the water power, built a sawmill at Brandywine Falls. It was a thriving community. Over the next decade, the Village of Brandywine added a whiskey distillery, gristmill, woolen mill, and a dozen houses. In 1824, Wallace transferred his property to his sons who then formed the Wallace Brothers Company. Business thrived for the next 30 years.

Eventually, Brandywine's prosperity dried up. The Ohio and Erie Canal, and later the railroads, shipped goods to the cities of Akron and Cleveland, leaving towns like Brandywine behind.

Except for the barn and house built by James Wallace in 1848 only a few hidden foundations remain of the Village of Brandywine. Near the falls, some foundations of the old gristmill can still be seen. The James Wallace House has been restored and now serves as a bed and breakfast, The Inn at Brandywine Falls.

== Gallery ==
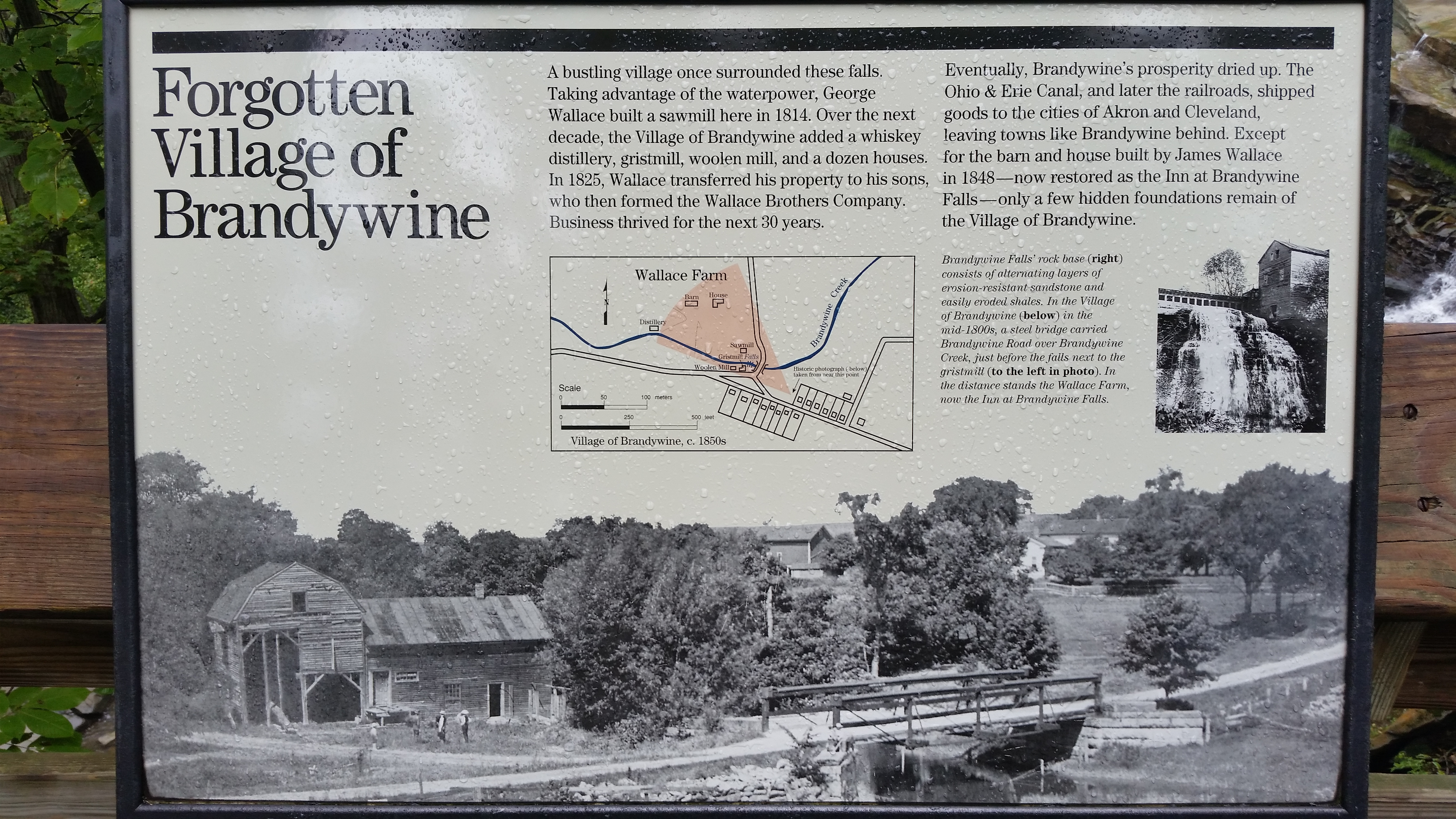
National Park marker for Brandywine Village

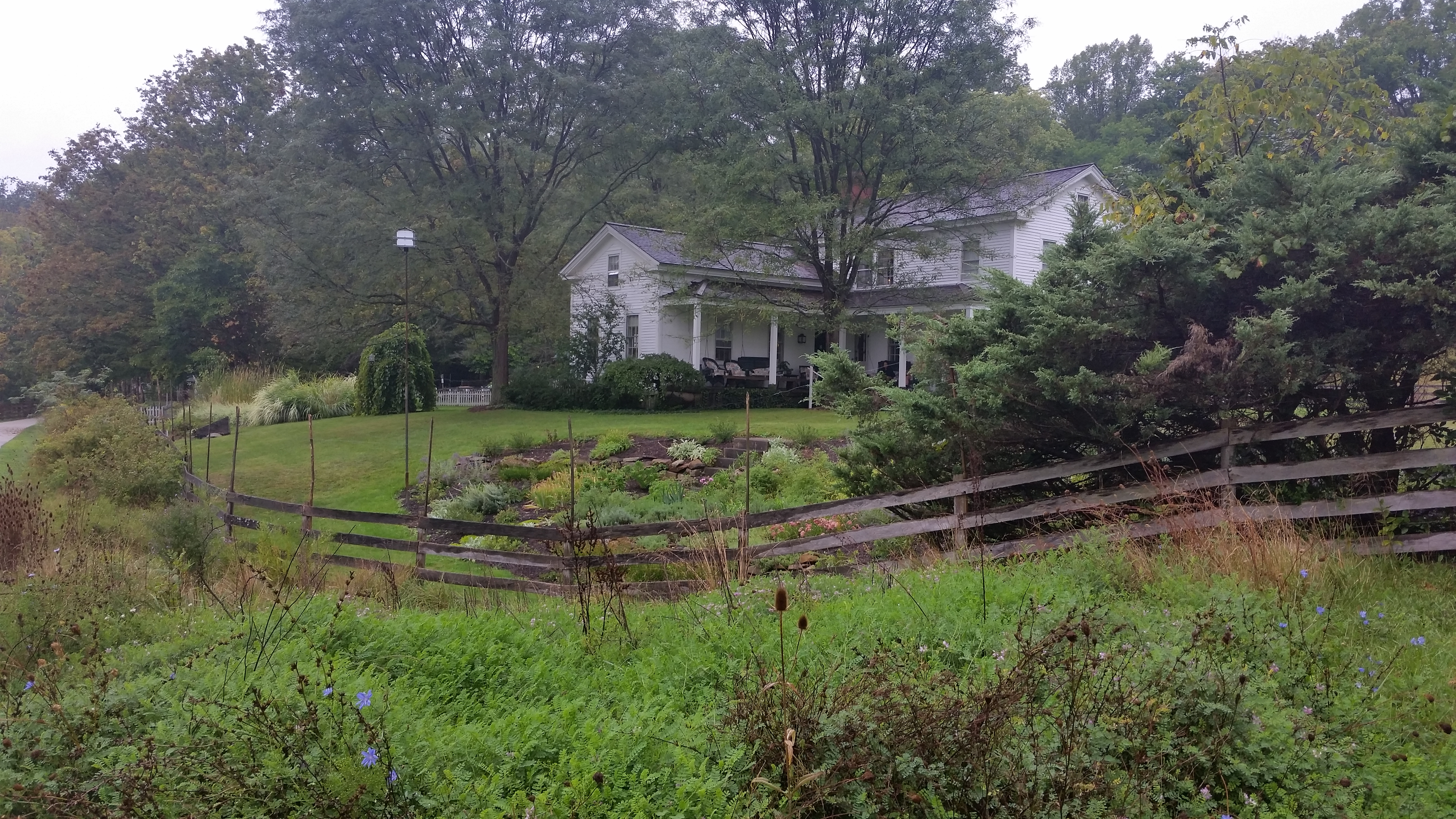
Inn at Brandywine Falls

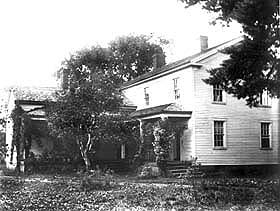
Barn and house built by James Wallace in 1848
