= Longwood Manor =

Historic house in Ohio, United States

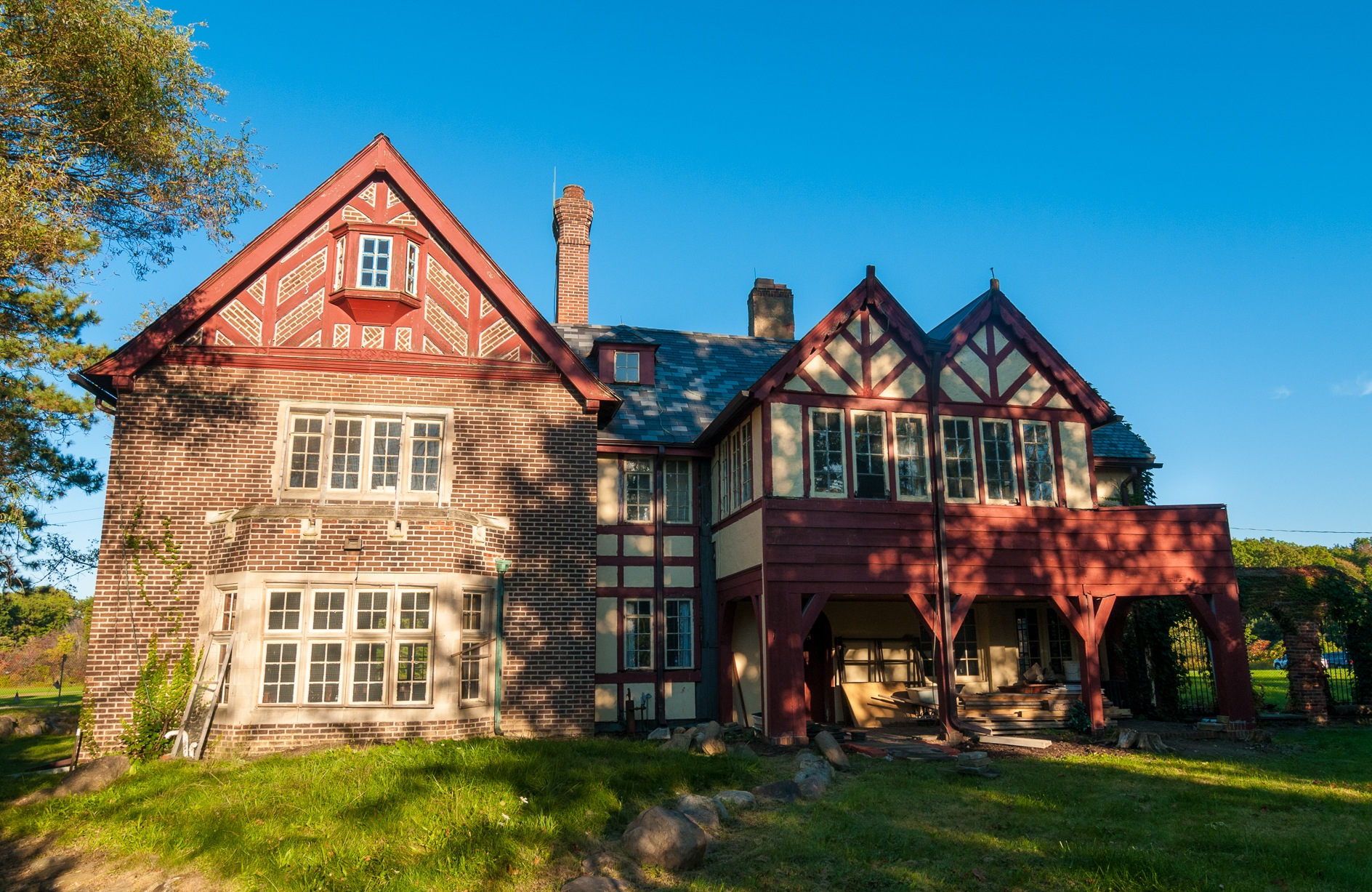
- Front of the house

General information
- Status: Under Restoration
- Type: Museum
- Architectural style: Tudor Revival
- Location: 1634 E Aurora Rd; Macedonia, Ohio
- Country: United States
- Completed: 1924
- Owner: City of Macedonia original owner: Colonel William Frew Long

Longwood Manor is a Tudor Revival house located in Macedonia, Ohio.

Longwood Manor was built in 1924 by Colonel William Frew Long. Long was the founding Mayor of Macedonia and a veteran of World Wars I and II. It was constructed in the Tudor Revival architectural style which makes it unique to this area.

In 1984, the 300 acres (120 hectares) around Longwood Manor and the Manor itself were given to the city of Macedonia for use as a public park. The property now houses the Macedonia Recreation center and Longwood Park. In 2007, public use of the Manor was suspended because it no longer met building code requirements.

In 2014, Longwood Manor was added to the National Register of Historic Places.

The manor is currently undergoing renovations so that it can return to public use as a Museum and public gathering space.
