= Lawrence School (Sagamore Hills, Ohio) =

School in Ohio, United States

Location
- Broadview Heights (Cuyahoga County) Sagamore Hills (Summit County), Ohio; United States
- Coordinates: 41°20′3″N 81°32′9″W (Upper School Campus); 41°20′43″N 81°20′29″W (Lower School Campus)

Information
- Type: Private, Coeducational
- Motto: Great Minds Don't Think Alike
- Established: 1969
- Head of school: Douglas Hamilton
- Grades: K-12
- Colors: Green and White
- Athletics conference: Lake Effect Conference
- Team name: Lions
- Accreditation: Independent Schools Association of the Central States (ISACS)
- Affiliation: National Association of Independent Schools Cleveland Council of Independent Schools Ohio Association of Independent Schools
- Athletic Director: Brian Cioffoletti
- Website: http://www.lawrenceschool.org

Lawrence School is an independent, coeducational day school serving K-12 students with learning differences such as dyslexia, dysgraphia, and dyscalculia. With its small class sizes, unique curricula, and hands-on learning opportunities, Lawrence School provides students with the tools and strategies they need to become successful learners. Lawrence School has two campus locations that are central to the Greater Cleveland and Akron metropolitan area. Lower School (grades K-6) in Broadview Heights and Upper School (grades 7–12) in Sagamore Hills Township draw families from more than 90 communities and welcomes a student body of 350-plus.

Lawrence School is a member of the National Association of Independent Schools (NAIS), the Cleveland Council of Independent Schools (CCIS), and the Ohio Association of Independent Schools (OAIS).

== History ==
In 1969, Dr. Kenneth Oldman, a reading and learning disability professor at Case Western Reserve University, developed an after-school literacy program for struggling readers. Continued expansion in 1974 led to the establishment of the Oldman Transitional School, a full-time school for students in grades 1–8 with learning disabilities. In 1980, Dr. Oldman retired and the school changed its name to The Transitional School. A year later, The Transitional School joined the dePaul Society in Louisville, Kentucky, adopting a calm, well-disciplined environment where students with learning differences could flourish. In 1982, the school changed its name to The dePaul School of Northeast Ohio as enrollment continued to grow.

The school's Broadview Heights location was purchased in 1986, and in 1992, as a result of the dissolution of the dePaul Society network and a larger, more diverse student population, the school gained its own identity as a school for bright students with learning differences and attention deficits. Local funders supported the creation of an updated, thorough academic program founded on research and experience. A language arts curriculum called CodeBreakers© was developed with the express purpose of helping kids with learning and attention differences learn to decode language and become proficient readers.

In 1993, the Board of Trustees decided to rename the school one last time in honor of Mrs. Lawrence Jontzen, the school's chief benefactor. In August, the school proudly opened its doors as Lawrence School. The Lawrence Board of Trustees approved the addition of a high school in 2000, with the first freshmen class admitted in 2001, the same year the capital campaign to open a new Upper School Campus was initiated.

Lawrence School purchased 47 acres in Sagamore Hills in 2002, with Strollo Architects from Youngstown hired to design the building and develop the site. In 2005, Lawrence School became Ohio's sole comprehensive institution for students with learning differences and attention deficit disorder. Every member of the first graduating class was accepted by their first choice college or post-secondary institution. Over half of the capital campaign was secured, and construction on the 62,000 square-foot school started in August by Ruhlin Construction Company. School enrollment continued to increase with full-time students representing 70 communities and 10 counties. Construction on the Upper School Campus completed in 2006. That same year, Lawrence School, in cooperation with Case Western Reserve University's graduate psychology program, launched the Ethan D. Schafer Center for Learning Differences at the Lower School Campus, providing all students in Northeast Ohio with affordable and professional learning disorder testing and comprehensive psychological assessment.

In January 2007, the Upper School Campus opened its doors, featuring wireless technology and notebook computers for each student, SMART Board™ interactive whiteboards in each classroom, assistive technology provided to those students with dyslexia and other learning differences, a theater, a space dedicated to the arts and sciences, regulation size baseball and soccer fields, and a full size gymnasium and weight room.

== Athletics ==
Lawrence School is a member of the Lake Effect Conference, offering 10 sports at the middle and high school level, including:

- Baseball
- Basketball
- Cheerleading
- Cross Country
- Esports
- Golf
- Soccer
- Softball
- Swimming
- Volleyball

== Accreditation and Memberships ==
Lawrence School is accredited by the Independent Schools Association of the Central States (ISACS) and chartered by the Ohio Department of Education. Memberships and affiliations include:

- National Association of Independent Schools
- Ohio Association of Independent Schools
- Cleveland Council of Independent Schools
- National Association for College Admission Counseling
- Ohio Association for College Admission Counseling
- International Dyslexia Association
- Learning Disabilities Association
