= Cleveland Council of Independent Schools =

Group of independent schools in Ohio, US

The Cleveland Council of Independent Schools (CCIS) is a consortium of independent schools in Northeast Ohio, United States.

CCIS was incorporated in 1967 after several years of periodic meetings of the trustees and heads of four east side independent schools: Hathaway Brown, Hawken, Laurel and University School. As of 2022, the council now has 20 member schools, including coed and single-sex schools, Montessori schools, and boarding schools. Its mission statement is: "CCIS serves member schools and their constituents by promoting, supporting, and enhancing the value of independent education in Northeast Ohio through the facilitation of meaningful collaboration."

== Member schools ==
As of 2022, the list of CCIS members schools is:

- Andrews Osborne Academy - member since 2014
- Birchwood School of Hawken - member since 2006
- Fuchs Mizrachi School
- Gilmour Academy - member since 2009
- Hathaway Brown School - founding member
- Hershey Montessori School
- Hawken School - founding member
- Hudson Montessori School
- Joseph and Florence Mandel Jewish Day School
- Lake Ridge Academy
- Laurel School - founding member
- Lawrence School
- The Lillian and Betty Ratner Montessori School - member since 2002
- The Master School of Hawken
- Old Trail School - member since 2016
- Ruffing Montessori School - member since 2004
- Ruffing Rocky River
- University School - founding member
- Urban Community School - member since 2019
- Western Reserve Academy - member since 1997
