= Northfield, Ohio =

- Village
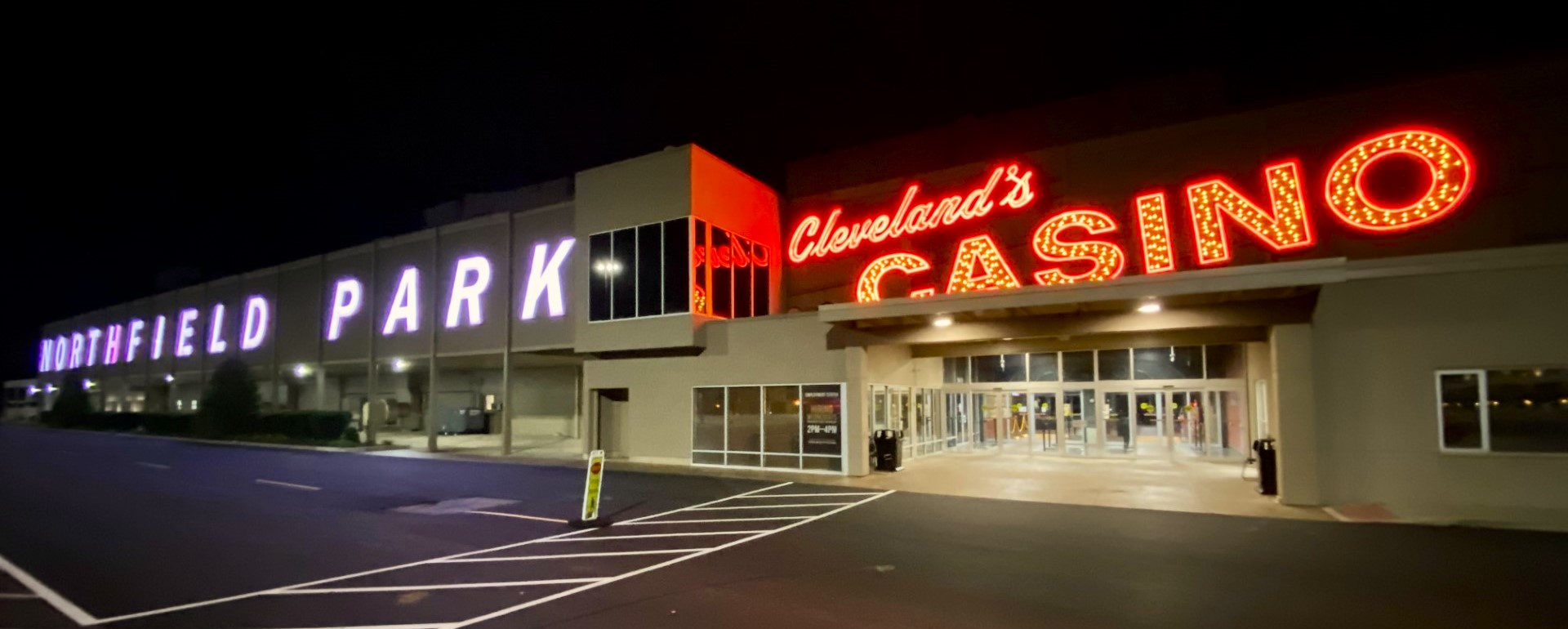
- Northfield Park Racino at night

- Location in Summit County and the state of Ohio.
- Coordinates: 41°20′33″N 81°31′43″W
- Country: United States
- State: Ohio
- County: Summit

Government
  - Mayor: Jennifer Domzalski

Area
  - Total: 1.05 sq mi (2.72 km^{2})
  - Land: 1.05 sq mi (2.71 km^{2})
  - Water: 0.0039 sq mi (0.01 km^{2})
- Elevation: 1,043 ft (318 m)

Population (2020)
  - Total: 3,541
  - Density: 3,380.9/sq mi (1,305.37/km^{2})
- Time zone: UTC-5 (Eastern (EST))
  - Summer (DST): UTC-4 (EDT)
- ZIP codes: 44056, 44067
- Area code: 330
- FIPS code: 39-56448
- GNIS feature ID: 1087010
- Website: http://www.northfieldvillage-oh.gov/

Northfield is a village in northern Summit County, Ohio, United States. The population was 3,541 at the 2020 census. It is part of the Akron metropolitan area.

== History ==
A post office called Northfield has been in operation since 1837. Some say the name is a transfer from Northfield, Massachusetts, while others believe the town site's location in the northern part of Summit County caused the name to be selected.

== Geography ==
According to the United States Census Bureau, the village has a total area of 1.08 square miles (2.80 km^{2}), all land.

== Demographics ==
Historical population
Census	Pop.	Note	%±
1920	861		—
1930	1,750		103.3%
1940	575		−67.1%
1950	780		35.7%
1960	1,055		35.3%
1970	4,283		306.0%
1980	3,913		−8.6%
1990	3,624		−7.4%
2000	3,827		5.6%
2010	3,677		−3.9%
2020	3,541		−3.7%
U.S. Decennial Census

=== 2020 census ===
As of the 2020 census, Northfield had a population of 3,541. The median age was 43.8 years. 18.4% of residents were under the age of 18 and 18.6% of residents were 65 years of age or older. For every 100 females there were 90.7 males, and for every 100 females age 18 and over there were 92.3 males age 18 and over.

100.0% of residents lived in urban areas, while 0.0% lived in rural areas.

There were 1,553 households in Northfield, of which 26.1% had children under the age of 18 living in them. Of all households, 38.4% were married-couple households, 23.7% were households with a male householder and no spouse or partner present, and 30.8% were households with a female householder and no spouse or partner present. About 35.2% of all households were made up of individuals and 12.5% had someone living alone who was 65 years of age or older.

There were 1,629 housing units, of which 4.7% were vacant. The homeowner vacancy rate was 1.3% and the rental vacancy rate was 2.6%.

Racial composition as of the 2020 census
Race	Number	Percent
White	2,736	77.3%
Black or African American	325	9.2%
American Indian and Alaska Native	6	0.2%
Asian	236	6.7%
Native Hawaiian and Other Pacific Islander	2	0.1%
Some other race	33	0.9%
Two or more races	203	5.7%
Hispanic or Latino (of any race)	105	3.0%

=== 2010 census ===
As of the census of 2010, there were 3,677 people, 1,545 households, and 992 families living in the village. The population density was 3,404.6 inhabitants per square mile (1,314.5/km^{2}). There were 1,644 housing units at an average density of 1,522.2 units per square mile (587.7 units/km^{2}). The racial makeup of the village was 85.6% White, 5.8% African American, 0.2% Native American, 5.3% Asian, 0.7% from other races, and 2.3% from two or more races. Hispanic or Latino of any race were 1.7% of the population.

There were 1,545 households, of which 30.7% had children under the age of 18 living with them, 43.7% were married couples living together, 15.7% had a female householder with no husband present, 4.9% had a male householder with no wife present, and 35.8% were non-families. 30.0% of all households were made up of individuals, and 9% had someone living alone who was 65 years of age or older. The average household size was 2.38 and the average family size was 2.97.

The median age in the village was 40.5 years. 21.7% of residents were under the age of 18; 8.1% were between the ages of 18 and 24; 27% were from 25 to 44; 29.9% were from 45 to 64; and 13.2% were 65 years of age or older. The gender makeup of the village was 49.4% male and 50.6% female.

=== 2000 census ===
As of the census of 2000, there were 3,827 people, 1,573 households, and 1,052 families living in the village. The population density was 3,568.1 inhabitants per square mile (1,377.7/km^{2}). There were 1,676 housing units at an average density of 1,562.6 units per square mile (603.3 units/km^{2}). The racial makeup of the village was 92.50% White, 3.40% African American, 0.24% Native American, 2.19% Asian, 0.63% from other races, and 1.05% from two or more races. Hispanic or Latino of any race were 0.84% of the population.

There were 1,573 households, out of which 33.4% had children under the age of 18 living with them, 48.2% were married couples living together, 14.3% had a female householder with no husband present, and 33.1% were non-families. 27.7% of all households were made up of individuals, and 6.0% had someone living alone who was 65 years of age or older. The average household size was 2.43 and the average family size was 2.97.

In the village, the population was spread out, with 24.3% under the age of 18, 7.1% from 18 to 24, 36.5% from 25 to 44, 22.4% from 45 to 64, and 9.7% who were 65 years of age or older. The median age was 35 years. For every 100 females there were 98.7 males. For every 100 females age 18 and over, there were 95.0 males.

The median income for a household in the village was $41,027, and the median income for a family was $50,230. Males had a median income of $35,777 versus $25,795 for females. The per capita income for the village was $19,007. About 2.1% of families and 4.3% of the population were below the poverty line, including 3.1% of those under age 18 and 7.4% of those age 65 or over.

== Attractions ==
MGM Northfield Park (previously known as Hard Rock Rocksino Northfield Park), a racino, is located in the village. On December 18, 2013, the Hard Rock opened "The Rocksino" at Northfield Park, a Hard Rock Café and a 320-seat venue. In 2018, MGM Growth Properties bought the property from Milstein Entertainment for $1.02 billion. Hard Rock continued to operate the property under a management agreement with the new owners. On April 1, 2019, MGM Growth's majority owner, MGM Resorts International, bought the Rocksino's operating business from MGM Growth for $275 million in stock, assumed control from Hard Rock, and rebranded the property as MGM Northfield Park. MGM Resorts would lease the property from MGM Growth for initial rent of $60 million per year.

Sportsman Park, originally built as a greyhound racing track in 1934 during Max Kliens term as mayor (1934–1938) and then shortly after the track changed ownership and the track switched from greyhound racing to midget car racing. Then in 1956 Sportsman Park was torn down to make way for what is known today as Northfield Park and Hard Rock Rocksino.

== Notable people ==
- Amzi Chapin, cabinetmaker and shapenote composer
- Cyrus S. Eaton, industrialist, financier
- Daniel Letterle, actor
- Timothy F. Murphy, United States Congressman from Pennsylvania.
- Ronald Sega, retired astronaut
- Marc Sumerak, comic-book author
- Vonda Ward, retired boxer, WBC Heavyweight Champion

== Education ==
Nordonia Hills City School District operates four elementary schools, one middle school, and Nordonia High School.

Northfield has a public library, a branch of the Akron-Summit County Public Library.
