= Sagamore Hills Township, Summit County, Ohio =

Township in Ohio, US

Sagamore Hills Township
- Civil township
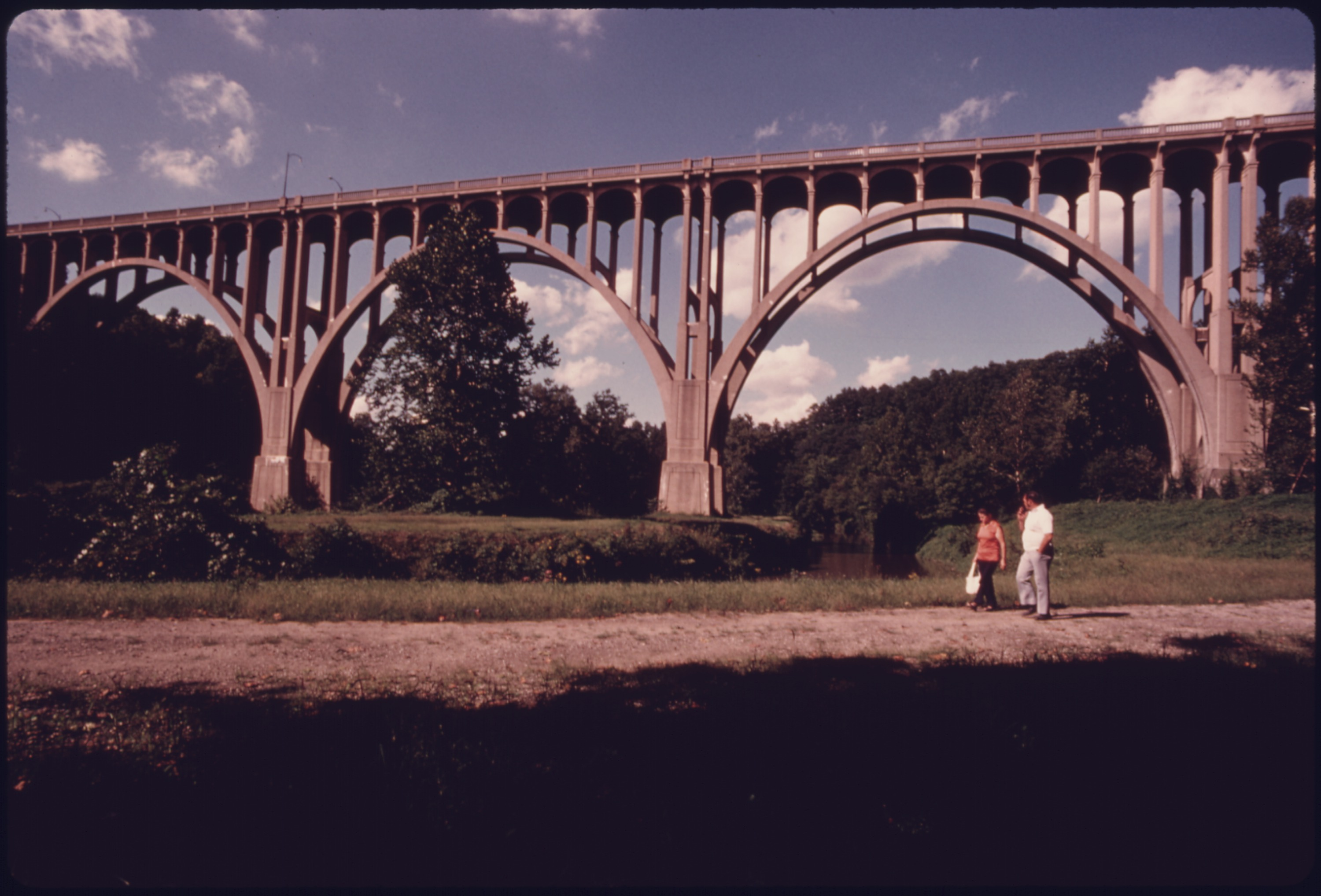
- The Brecksville-Northfield High Level Bridge

- Location in Summit County and the state of Ohio.
- Coordinates: 41°19′8″N 81°33′23″W
- Country: United States
- State: Ohio
- County: Summit
- Established: Emergency services are provided by the Sagamore Hills Police Department headed by Chief David Hayes and the Northfeild Center Fire Department. Both departments may be reached at (330)468-0900.

Area
  - Total: 11.3 sq mi (29.3 km^{2})
  - Land: 11.3 sq mi (29.2 km^{2})
  - Water: 0 sq mi (0.0 km^{2})
- Elevation: 932 ft (284 m)

Population (2020)
  - Total: 10,845
  - Density: 962/sq mi (371.4/km^{2})
- Time zone: UTC-5 (Eastern (EST))
  - Summer (DST): UTC-4 (EDT)
- ZIP code: 44067
- Area code: 330
- FIPS code: 39-69428
- GNIS feature ID: 1087015
- Website: mysagamorehills.com

Sagamore Hills Township is one of the nine townships of Summit County, Ohio, United States. As of the 2020 census, the population was 10,845.

== Geography ==
Located in the northwestern part of the county, it borders the following townships and municipalities:

- Walton Hills - north
- Northfield - northeast
- Northfield Center Township - east
- Boston Township - south
- Brecksville - west
- Independence - northwest corner
- Valley View - northwest, east of Independence

No municipalities are located in Sagamore Hills Township.

== Name and history ==
It is the only Sagamore Hills Township statewide.

== Government ==
The township is governed by a three-member board of trustees, who are elected in November of odd-numbered years to a four-year term beginning on the following January 1. Two are elected in the year after the presidential election and one is elected in the year before it. There is also an elected township fiscal officer, who serves a four-year term beginning on April 1 of the year after the election, which is held in November of the year before the presidential election. Vacancies in the fiscal officership or on the board of trustees are filled by the remaining trustees.

== Schools ==
Sagamore Hills is part of the Nordonia Hills City School District school system. Rushwood Elementary is located in Sagamore Hills.

== See also ==
- Lawrence Upper School
