= Northfield Center Township, Summit County, Ohio =

Township in Ohio, US

- Township
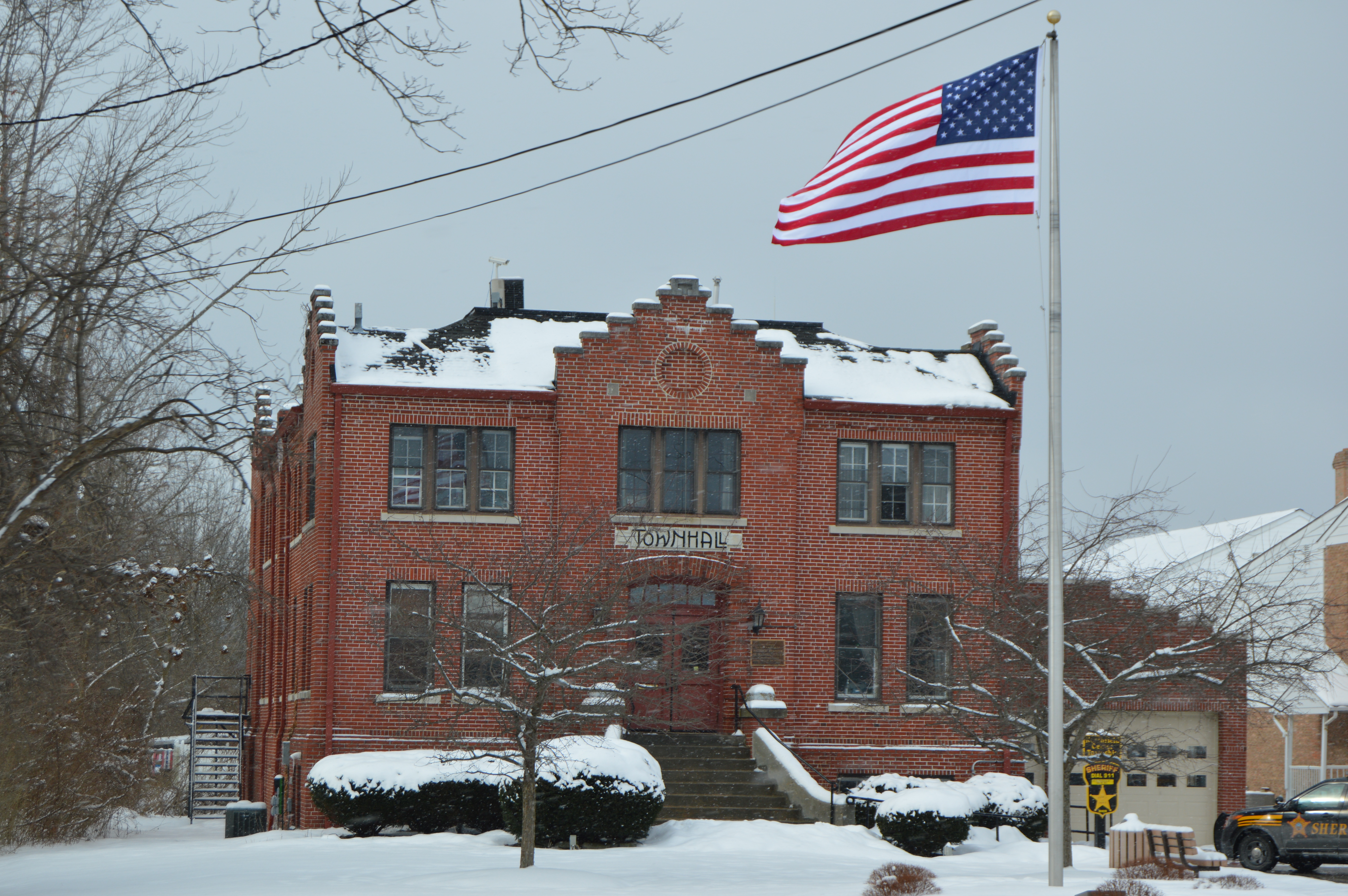
- Town hall

- Location in Summit County and the state of Ohio.
- Coordinates: 41°17′45″N 81°31′46″W
- Country: United States
- State: Ohio
- County: Summit

Area
  - Total: 5.3 sq mi (13.8 km^{2})
  - Land: 5.3 sq mi (13.8 km^{2})
  - Water: 0 sq mi (0.0 km^{2})
- Elevation: 971 ft (296 m)

Population (2020)
  - Total: 5,597
  - Density: 1,050/sq mi (406/km^{2})
- Time zone: UTC-5 (Eastern (EST))
  - Summer (DST): UTC-4 (EDT)
- ZIP code: 44067
- Area code: 330
- FIPS code: 39-56490
- GNIS feature ID: 1087011
- Website: Northfield Center Township

Northfield Center Township is one of the nine townships of Summit County, Ohio, United States. The 2020 census found 5,597 people in the township.

== Geography ==
Located in the northern part of the county, it borders the following townships and municipalities:

- Northfield - north
- Macedonia - northeast
- Hudson - southeast corner
- Boston Heights - south
- Boston Township - southwest
- Sagamore Hills Township - west

Several municipalities are located in what was originally part of Northfield Center Township:

- A small part of the village of Boston Heights, in the southeast
- The village of Northfield, in the north
- Much of the city of Macedonia, in the east

== Name and history ==
It is the only Northfield Center Township statewide.

== Government ==
The township is governed by a three-member board of trustees, who are elected in November of odd-numbered years to a four-year term beginning on the following January 1. Two are elected in the year after the presidential election and one is elected in the year before it. There is also an elected township fiscal officer, who serves a four-year term beginning on April 1 of the year after the election, which is held in November of the year before the presidential election. Vacancies in the fiscal officership or on the board of trustees are filled by the remaining trustees.
