= Macedonia, Ohio =

- City
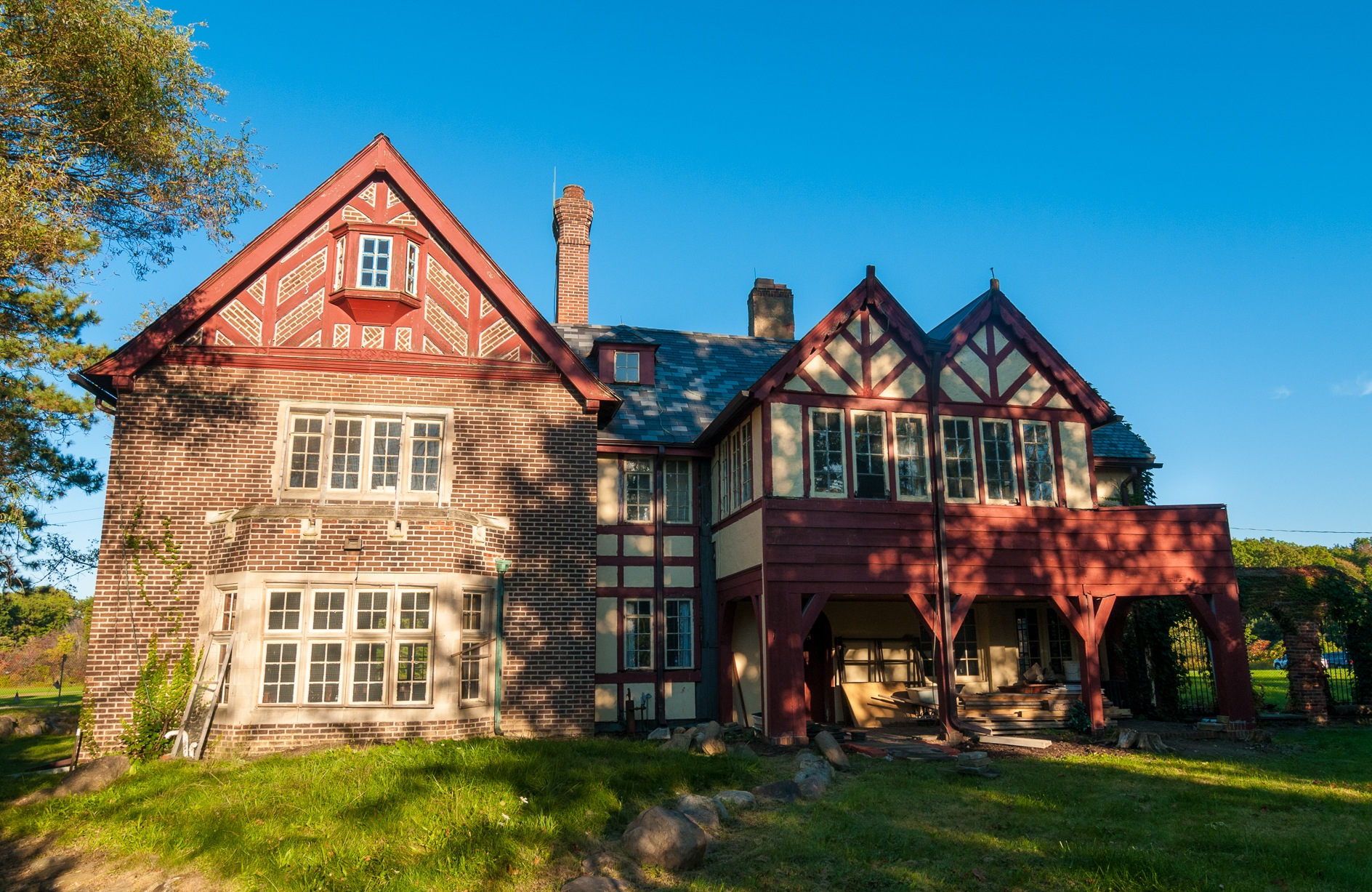
- Longwood Manor

- Flag Seal
- Motto: "The Crossroads of Northeast Ohio"
- Interactive map of Macedonia, Ohio
- Location within Ohio Location within the United States
- Coordinates: 41°19′4″N 81°30′15″W
- Country: United States
- State: Ohio
- County: Summit

Area
  - Total: 9.76 sq mi (25.29 km^{2})
  - Land: 9.73 sq mi (25.20 km^{2})
  - Water: 0.035 sq mi (0.09 km^{2})
- Elevation: 1,034 ft (315 m)

Population (2020)
  - Total: 12,168
  - Density: 1,250.6/sq mi (482.87/km^{2})
- Time zone: UTC-5 (Eastern (EST))
  - Summer (DST): UTC-4 (EDT)
- ZIP code: 44056
- Area code: 330
- FIPS code: 39-45976
- GNIS feature ID: 1087006
- Website: http://www.macedonia.oh.us/

Macedonia is a city in northern Summit County, Ohio, United States. The population was 12,168 at the 2020 census. It is a suburb in the Akron metropolitan area.

== History ==
The city's name is said to derive from a small joke among divinity students at Western Reserve College, which in the early 19th century was in Hudson, Ohio. The students, who were called upon to preach in the small hamlet 6 miles (10 km) to the north, recalled a bible passage, Acts 16:10: "...we sought to go to Macedonia, concluding that the Lord had called us to preach the gospel to them."

== Geography ==
According to the United States Census Bureau, the city has a total area of 9.75 square miles (25.25 km^{2}), including 9.71 square miles (25.15 km^{2}) of land and 0.04 square miles (0.10 km^{2}) of water.

== Demographics ==
Historical population
Census	Pop.	Note	%±
1880	219		—
1910	452		—
1920	581		28.5%
1930	734		26.3%
1970	6,375		—
1980	6,571		3.1%
1990	7,509		14.3%
2000	9,224		22.8%
2010	11,188		21.3%
2020	12,168		8.8%
2025 (est.)	12,147		−0.2%

=== Income and education ===
The median income for a household in the city was $77,866, and the median income for a family was $88,906. The per capita income for the city was $32,960. About 2.1% of the population were below the poverty line. Of the city's population over the age of 25, 41.2% holds a bachelor's degree or higher.

=== 2020 census ===
As of the 2020 census, Macedonia had a population of 12,168. The median age was 47.3 years, with 18.9% of residents under the age of 18 and 22.1% of residents 65 years of age or older. For every 100 females there were 94.2 males, and for every 100 females age 18 and over there were 91.9 males age 18 and over.

100.0% of residents lived in urban areas, while 0.0% lived in rural areas.

There were 4,894 households in Macedonia, of which 27.2% had children under the age of 18 living in them. Of all households, 61.7% were married-couple households, 12.1% were households with a male householder and no spouse or partner present, and 21.1% were households with a female householder and no spouse or partner present. About 23.2% of all households were made up of individuals and 13.4% had someone living alone who was 65 years of age or older.

There were 5,094 housing units, of which 3.9% were vacant. The homeowner vacancy rate was 0.7% and the rental vacancy rate was 14.0%.

Racial composition as of the 2020 census
Race	Number	Percent
White	9,535	78.4%
Black or African American	1,468	12.1%
American Indian and Alaska Native	10	0.1%
Asian	571	4.7%
Native Hawaiian and Other Pacific Islander	3	0.0%
Some other race	66	0.5%
Two or more races	515	4.2%
Hispanic or Latino (of any race)	198	1.6%

=== 2010 census ===
As of the 2010 census, there were 11,188 people, 4,338 households, and 3,231 families residing in the city. The population density was 1,152.2 inhabitants per square mile (444.9/km^{2}). There were 4,545 housing units at an average density of 468.1 per square mile (180.7/km^{2}). The racial makeup of the city was 83.6% White, 10.4% African American, 0.1% Native American, 3.9% Asian, 0.4% from other races, and 1.6% from two or more races. Hispanic or Latino of any race were 1.3% of the population.

There were 4,338 households, of which 31.1% had children under the age of 18 living with them, 63.5% were married couples living together, 8.0% had a female householder with no husband present, 3.0% had a male householder with no wife present, and 25.5% were non-families. 21.3% of all households were made up of individuals, and 9.6% were composed of a person 65 years or older living alone. The average household size was 2.58 and the average family size was 3.01.

The median age in the city was 43.4 years. 22.3% of residents were under the age of 18; 6.5% were between the ages of 18 and 24; 24% were from 25 to 44; 32.7% were from 45 to 64; and 14.7% were 65 years of age or older. The gender makeup of the city was 48.5% male and 51.5% female.

== Notable people ==
- Je'Rod Cherry, retired, NFL safety, New England Patriots
- Mark Foster, lead vocalist for the indie pop band Foster the People
- John Lefelhocz, conceptual artist and quilter
- Ronald M. Sega, retired NASA Astronaut
- Rob Sims, NFL guard, Detroit Lions, former Ohio State University Buckeye
- Jason Trusnik, NFL Player former Cleveland Browns and Miami Dolphins
- Denzel Ward, NFL cornerback, Cleveland Browns
- Vonda Ward, female boxer and former University of Tennessee basketball player
