= National Register of Historic Places listings in Cuyahoga Valley National Park =

This is a list of the National Register of Historic Places listings in Cuyahoga Valley National Park.

This is intended to be a complete list of the properties and districts on the National Register of Historic Places in Cuyahoga Valley National Park, Ohio, United States. The locations of National Register properties and districts for which the latitude and longitude coordinates are included below, may be seen in a Google map.

There are 61 properties and districts listed on the National Register in the park, one of which is a National Historic Landmark.

This National Park Service list is complete through NPS recent listings posted April 17, 2026.

== Current listings ==
	Name on the Register	Image	Date listed	Location	City or town	Description
1	Barker Village Site	Barker Village Site	April 19, 1978 (#78000379)	Just north of the old railroad station at Botzum; 41°09′56″N 81°34′39″W	Cuyahoga Falls	Discovered when the Ohio and Erie Canal was constructed through the site
2	Boston Mills Historic District	Boston Mills Historic District	November 9, 1992 (#92001490)	Roughly Riverview, Boston Mills, and Stanford Rds. and Main St. 41°15′52″N 81°33′34″W	Boston Township	
3	Botzum Farm	Botzum Farm	October 21, 1999 (#99001271)	3486 Riverview Rd. 41°10′29″N 81°34′54″W	Cuyahoga Falls	
4	Jim Brown House	Jim Brown House	March 2, 1979 (#79000299)	South of Peninsula at 3491 Akron Peninsula Rd. 41°10′54″N 81°34′42″W	Cuyahoga Falls	
5	Jim Brown Tavern	Jim Brown Tavern	December 11, 1979 (#79000300)	Boston Mills Rd. 41°15′48″N 81°33′31″W	Boston Township	
6	William Burt House	William Burt House	March 22, 1979 (#79000286)	9525 Brecksville Rd. 41°18′10″N 81°37′36″W	Brecksville	
7	H. Karl Butler Memorial	H. Karl Butler Memorial	January 2, 1997 (#96001510)	Truxell Rd., southeast of its junction with Peninsula Rd., Camp Manatoc; 41°13′19″N 81°31′49″W	Boston Township	Honors H. Karl Butler who donated land for Camp Manatoc.
8	Camp Manatoc Concord Lodge and Adirondacks Historic District	Camp Manatoc Concord Lodge and Adirondacks Historic District	January 2, 1997 (#96001513)	Truxell Rd., southeast of its junction with Peninsula Rd., Camp Manatoc; 41°13′07″N 81°31′46″W	Boston Township	
9	Camp Manatoc Dining Hall	Camp Manatoc Dining Hall	January 2, 1997 (#96001511)	Truxell Rd., southeast of its junction with Peninsula Rd., Camp Manatoc; 41°13′15″N 81°31′44″W	Boston Township	
10	Camp Manatoc Foresters Lodge and Kit Carson-Dan Boone Cabins Historic District	Camp Manatoc Foresters Lodge and Kit Carson-Dan Boone Cabins Historic District	January 2, 1997 (#96001514)	Truxell Rd., southeast of its junction with Peninsula Rd., Camp Manatoc; 41°13′39″N 81°31′58″W	Boston Township	
11	Camp Manatoc Legion Lodge	Camp Manatoc Legion Lodge	January 2, 1997 (#96001512)	Truxell Rd., southeast of its junction with Peninsula Rd., Camp Manatoc; 41°13′07″N 81°31′46″W	Boston Township	
12	Albert Cofta Farmstead	Albert Cofta Farmstead	November 4, 2004 (#04001214)	2966 Brush Rd., northeast of Richfield; 41°15′13″N 81°36′56″W	Richfield Township	
13	Jonas Coonrad House	Jonas Coonrad House	July 24, 1979 (#79000287)	Southeast of Brecksville at 10340 Riverview Rd. 41°16′50″N 81°34′21″W	Brecksville	
14	Edward Cranz Farm	Edward Cranz Farm	March 12, 1993 (#93000077)	2780 Oak Hill Dr., south of Peninsula; 41°11′50″N 81°35′31″W	Bath Township	
15	William and Eugene Cranz Farm	William and Eugene Cranz Farm	March 12, 1993 (#93000078)	2401 Ira Rd., south of Peninsula; 41°11′15″N 81°35′31″W	Bath Township	
16	Michael Duffy Farm	Michael Duffy Farm	March 12, 1993 (#93000079)	4965 Quick Rd., southeast of Peninsula; 41°12′15″N 81°30′58″W	Boston Township	
17	Everett Historic District	Everett Historic District	January 14, 1993 (#93001467)	4731-4642 Riverview Rd. and 2151-2279 Everett Rd., south of Peninsula, in the Cuyahoga Valley National Park; 41°12′16″N 81°34′29″W	Boston Township	
18	Everett Knoll Complex	Everett Knoll Complex	May 25, 1977 (#77000157)	Southern side of Everett Rd., west of its junction with Riverview Rd. 41°12′16″N 81°34′33″W	Boston Township	
19	Stephen Frazee House	Stephen Frazee House	May 4, 1976 (#76000211)	7733 Canal Rd. 41°21′10″N 81°35′34″W	Valley View	
20	Furnace Run Aqueduct	Furnace Run Aqueduct	December 11, 1979 (#79000301)	Furnace Run; 41°12′06″N 81°34′22″W	Cuyahoga Falls	
21	Edmund Gleason House	Edmund Gleason House	December 18, 1978 (#78000377)	7243 Canal Rd. 41°22′02″N 81°36′38″W	Valley View	
22	Hunt-Wilke Farm	Hunt-Wilke Farm	March 12, 1993 (#93000080)	2049 Bolanz Rd. 41°12′04″N 81°34′19″W	Cuyahoga Falls	
23	Jaite Mill Historic District	Jaite Mill Historic District	May 21, 1979 (#79000288)	Southeast of Brecksville at Riverview and Vaughan Rds. 41°17′10″N 81°34′06″W	Sagamore Hills Township	
24	Virginia Kendall State Park Historic District	Virginia Kendall State Park Historic District	January 2, 1997 (#96001515)	701, 801, and 1000 Truxell Rd. and 434 W. Streetsboro, southeast of Peninsula; 41°13′04″N 81°31′15″W	Boston Township	
25	William Knapp House	William Knapp House	March 19, 1979 (#79000289)	7101 Canal Rd. 41°22′20″N 81°36′42″W	Valley View	
26	Lock No. 26	Lock No. 26	December 11, 1979 (#79000302)	3.3 mi (5.3 km) north of Ira Rd. 41°11′08″N 81°34′53″W	Cuyahoga Falls	
27	Lock No. 27	Lock No. 27	December 11, 1979 (#79000303)	Approximately 400 ft (120 m) east of the intersection of Riverview and Everett Rds. at Everett; 41°12′11″N 81°34′15″W	Boston Township	
28	Lock No. 28	Lock No. 28	December 11, 1979 (#79000304)	Deep Lock Q Quarry Metro Park; 41°13′58″N 81°33′09″W	Peninsula	
29	Lock No. 29 and Aqueduct	Lock No. 29 and Aqueduct	December 11, 1979 (#79000305)	Off State Route 303; 41°14′34″N 81°33′02″W	Peninsula	
30	Lock No. 30 and Feeder Dam	Lock No. 30 and Feeder Dam	December 11, 1979 (#79000306)	Off State Route 303; 41°14′41″N 81°33′14″W	Peninsula	
31	Lock No. 31	Lock No. 31	December 11, 1979 (#79000307)	200 ft (61 m) east of the Cuyahoga River and approximately 0.5 mi (0.80 km) south of the Ohio Turnpike; 41°15′06″N 81°32′46″W	Peninsula	
32	Lock No. 32	Lock No. 32	December 11, 1979 (#79000308)	800 ft (240 m) north of Boston Mills; 41°15′58″N 81°33′32″W	Boston Township	
33	Lock No. 33	Lock No. 33	December 11, 1979 (#79000309)	1 mi (1.6 km) south of Highland Rd. 41°16′36″N 81°33′40″W	Boston Township	
34	Lock No. 34	Lock No. 34	December 17, 1979 (#79000310)	Highland Rd. 41°17′21″N 81°33′53″W	Sagamore Hills Township	
35	Lock No. 35	Lock No. 35	December 11, 1979 (#79000311)	Off State Route 82; 41°18′38″N 81°34′56″W	Sagamore Hills Township	
36	Lock No. 37 and Spillway	Lock No. 37 and Spillway	December 11, 1979 (#79000290)	Fitzwater Rd. 41°21′24″N 81°35′50″W	Valley View	
37	Lock No. 38 and Spillway	Lock No. 38 and Spillway	December 11, 1979 (#79000291)	Hillside Rd. 41°22′21″N 81°36′46″W	Valley View	
38	Lock No. 39 and Spillway	Lock No. 39 and Spillway	December 11, 1979 (#79000292)	Canal Rd. 41°23′25″N 81°37′30″W	Valley View	
39	Lock Tender's House and Inn	Lock Tender's House and Inn	December 11, 1979 (#79000293)	7104 Canal Rd. 41°22′21″N 81°36′47″W	Valley View	
40	Lutz-Martin Farm	Lutz-Martin Farm	July 3, 2003 (#03000608)	2470 Martin Rd. 41°10′28″N 81°35′30″W	Bath Township	
41	Ohio and Erie Canal	Ohio and Erie Canal	November 13, 1966 (#66000607)	State Route 631; 41°22′14″N 81°36′59″W	Valley View	
42	Ohio and Erie Canal Deep Lock	Ohio and Erie Canal Deep Lock	September 9, 1974 (#74000345)	South of Peninsula on Riverview Rd. 41°13′58″N 81°33′09″W	Peninsula	
43	Packard-Doubler House	Packard-Doubler House	March 9, 1979 (#79000294)	7634 Riverview Rd. 41°21′18″N 81°36′12″W	Independence	
44	Peninsula Village Historic District	Peninsula Village Historic District	August 23, 1974 (#74000346)	Both sides of State Route 303; 41°14′24″N 81°33′03″W	Peninsula	
45	Nathaniel Point Farm	Nathaniel Point Farm	September 3, 1999 (#99001084)	4606 and 4631 Akron-Peninsula Rd., south of Peninsula; 41°12′20″N 81°33′46″W	Boston Township	
46	Charles B. Rich House	Charles B. Rich House	February 22, 1979 (#79000295)	9367 Brecksville Rd. 41°18′25″N 81°37′36″W	Brecksville	
47	Russ and Holland Snow Houses	Russ and Holland Snow Houses	September 28, 1982 (#82001873)	12911 and 13114 Snowville Rd. 41°16′59″N 81°35′39″W	Brecksville	
48	South Park Site	South Park Site	June 22, 1976 (#76000212)	On a promontory above the western bank of the Cuyahoga River, 7 miles from Lake Erie; 41°22′43″N 81°37′20″W	Independence	
49	George Stanford Farm	George Stanford Farm	February 17, 1982 (#82001874)	6093 Stanford Rd., north of Peninsula; 41°16′16″N 81°33′25″W	Boston Township	
50	Station Road Bridge	Station Road Bridge	March 7, 1979 (#79000312)	East of Brecksville at the Cuyahoga River; 41°19′10″N 81°35′16″W	Sagamore Hills Township	
51	Stebbens Farm	Stebbens Farm	April 17, 1996 (#96000381)	8255 Riverview Rd. 41°20′19″N 81°35′40″W	Brecksville	
52	Stumpy Basin	Stumpy Basin	December 11, 1979 (#79000313)	200 ft (61 m) east of the Cuyahoga River and approximately 0.5 mi (0.80 km) south of the Ohio Turnpike, north of Peninsula; 41°15′09″N 81°32′45″W	Boston Township	
53	Terra Vista Archeological District	Terra Vista Archeological District	May 23, 1978 (#78000378)	On the edge of a bluff above the Cuyahoga River, north of its confluence with Tinkers Creek; 41°22′06″N 81°36′37″W	Valley View	
54	Daniel Tilden House	Daniel Tilden House	June 20, 1985 (#85001340)	2325 Stine Rd., west of Peninsula; 41°14′48″N 81°35′17″W	Boston Township	
55	Tinkers Creek Aqueduct	Tinkers Creek Aqueduct	December 11, 1979 (#79000296)	Tinkers Creek; 41°21′53″N 81°36′33″W	Valley View	
56	Abraham Ulyatt House	Abraham Ulyatt House	February 27, 1979 (#79000297)	6579 Canal Rd. 41°23′10″N 81°37′11″W	Valley View	
57	Valley Railway Historic District	Valley Railway Historic District	May 17, 1985 (#85001123)	Cuyahoga Valley between Rockside Rd. at the Cuyahoga Valley National Park and Howard St. at Little Cuyahoga Valley; 41°13′38″N 81°34′13″W	Brecksville and Independence	
58	Richard Vaughn Farm	Richard Vaughn Farm	March 12, 1993 (#93000081)	9570 Riverview Rd. 41°18′03″N 81°34′58″W	Brecksville	
59	Wallace Farm	Wallace Farm	June 27, 1985 (#85001387)	8230 Brandywine Rd. 41°16′40″N 81°32′26″W	Northfield Center Township	
60	Allen Welton House	Allen Welton House	May 7, 1979 (#79000314)	Southwest of Peninsula at 2485 Major Rd. 41°14′00″N 81°35′01″W	Boston Township	
61	Wilson Feed Mill	Wilson Feed Mill	December 17, 1979 (#79000298)	7604 Canal Rd. 41°21′22″N 81°35′48″W	Valley View	

== See also ==
- National Register of Historic Places listings in Akron, Ohio
- National Register of Historic Places listings in Cuyahoga County, Ohio
- National Register of Historic Places listings in Summit County, Ohio
- List of National Historic Landmarks in Ohio
- National Register of Historic Places listings in Ohio
