= Boston Mills =

Boston Mills may refer to:

- Boston Mills, previously known as Boston, a community in Caledon, Ontario, Canada
- Boston Mills/Brandywine Ski Resort, in Ohio, United States
- Shedd, Oregon, United States, previously known as Boston Mills
  - Boston Flour Mill, in Shedd
- Boston, Summit County, Ohio, historically known as Boston Mills
- Boston Mills Historic District, in Ohio, United States
