= Paul W. Litchfield =

American businessman and Chairman of Goodyear Tire and Rubber Company

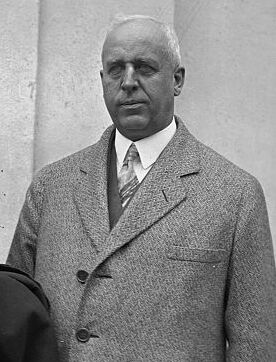
- Litchfield in 1929
- Born: Paul Weeks Litchfield; July 26, 1875; Boston, Massachusetts, U.S.
- Died: March 18, 1959 (aged 83); Phoenix, Arizona, U.S.
- Education: Massachusetts Institute of Technology
- Occupations: Businessman, author, inventor and founder of the city of Litchfield Park, Arizona
- Spouse: Florence Brinton Litchfield (m. 1904)

Paul Weeks Litchfield (July 26, 1875 – March 18, 1959) was an American inventor, industrialist, and author. He served as President, Chairman, and the first CEO of the Goodyear Tire & Rubber Company and the founder of the town of Litchfield Park, Arizona and the city of Goodyear, Arizona. Among his many accomplishments as chairman was the establishment of a research and development department that produced the first practical airplane tire, long-haul conveyor belts, hydraulic disc brakes for airplanes, the first pneumatic truck tire, and a bullet-sealing fuel tank for military airplanes. Litchfield was also the author of books on air power, trucks, employee relations, and business.

== Early years ==
Paul Weeks Litchfield was born in Boston, Massachusetts to Charles M. Litchfield and Julia W. Litchfield. He was a descendant of Mayflower pilgrims. He received his primary and secondary education in his native city and continued his higher education at Massachusetts Institute of Technology. In 1896, he graduated and earned a degree in chemical engineering. His first job in the rubber business was with a bicycle-tire manufacturer.

== Goodyear Tire and Rubber Company ==
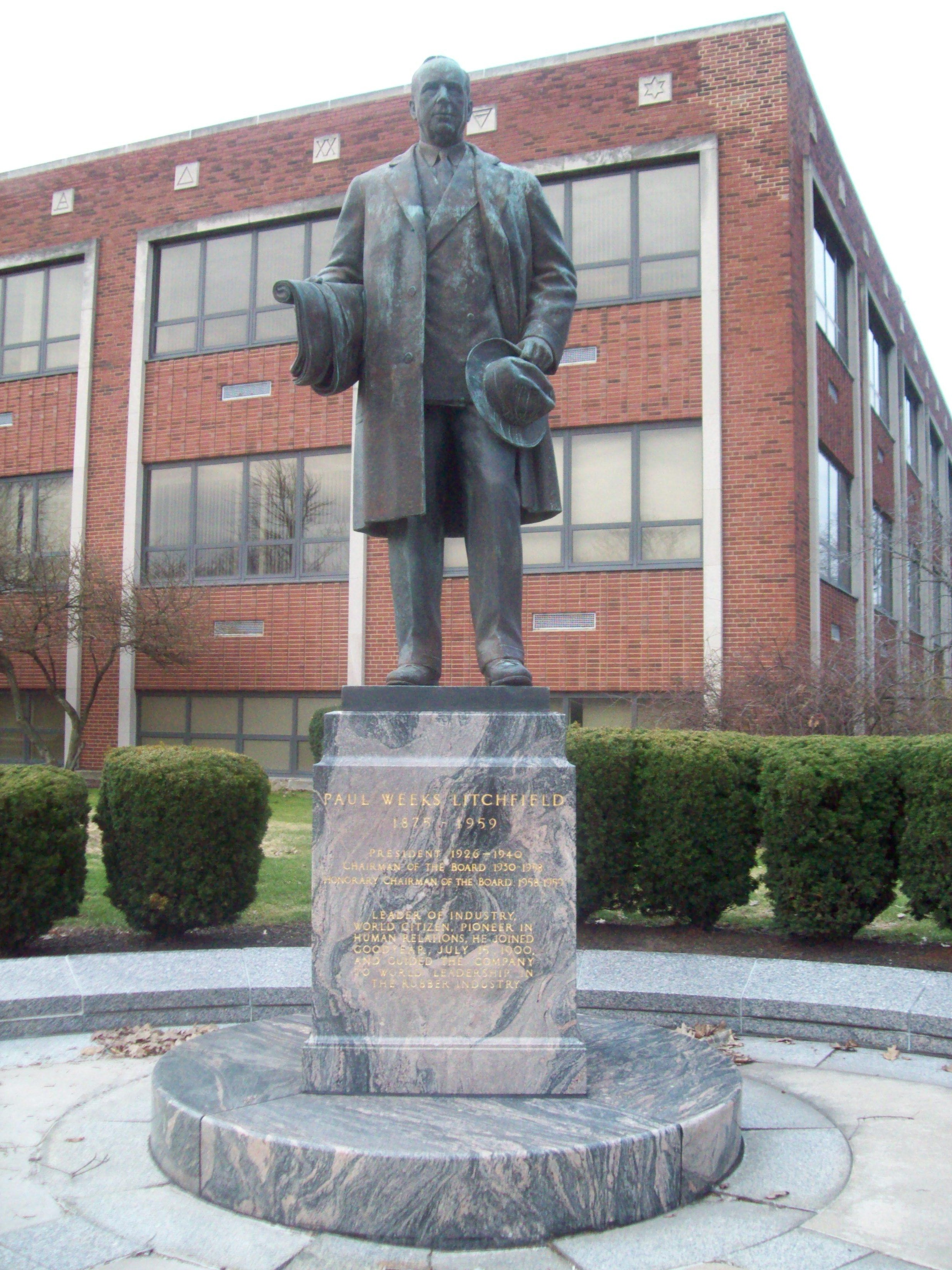
Statue of Paul W. Litchfield at the headquarters of the Goodyear Tire & Rubber Company in Akron, Ohio

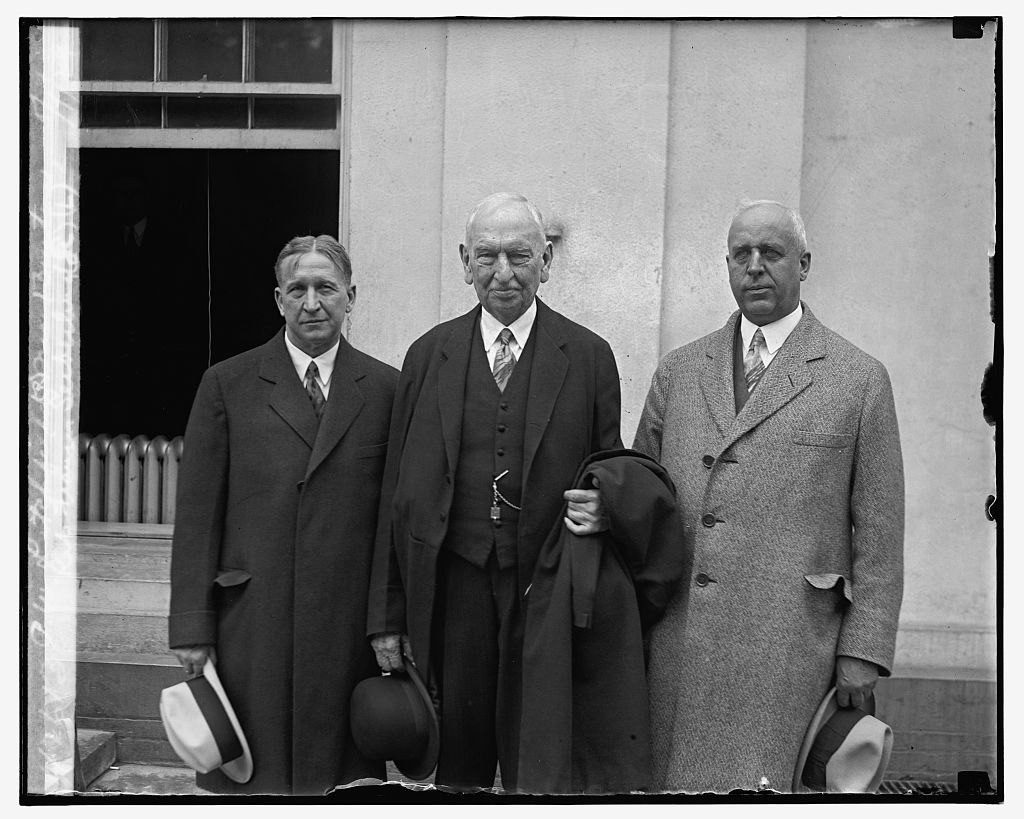
Litchfield (right) with Burton K. Wheeler (left) and Francis Seiberling (center)

Litchfield went to work for the Goodyear Tire & Rubber Company plant in Akron, Ohio. He soon became superintendent of the plant. In 1899, he designed and patented the first pneumatic wheels (tubeless tires) which were used in New York City's busses on Fifth Avenue. He became the superintendent and plant manager by 1900. In 1903, he met Florence Pennington Printon, who worked for the Akron Beacon Journal. They were married on June 23, 1904.

Under his direction, Goodyear began to experiment in the development of airplane parts. In 1910, he advocated for the establishment of an aeronautics department in the company. The company accepted his ideas and began to be involved in the production of aircraft that were lighter-than-air. The new department also produced observation balloons and after World War I, would team up with the German Luftschiffbau Zeppelin Company to produce zeppelins, and dirigibles. Some of these set size and altitude records.

During World War I, the demand for cotton was at an all-time high in the United States. He needed strong fabric for a new tire he designed, he wanted it woven only from long cotton staple. Litchfield believed there were places in the United States where the climate and soil conditions were very similar to those of the Nile Valley in Egypt. The United States Department of Agriculture suggested that cotton could be grown in the area surrounding Phoenix, Arizona.

== Litchfield Park ==
He became interested in the Salt River Valley area and convinced the Goodyear company to establish the Southwest Cotton Company in Phoenix. Litchfield was named president and he purchased 36,000 acres (15,000 ha) in the general Salt River Valley area which included 5,000 acres (2,000 ha) around the present site of Litchfield Park, then known as Litchfield Ranch. He and Southwest Cotton also leased about 8,000 acres from Chandler Improvement Company which owned a large portion of land around Phoenix at the time, and purchased the Marinette Ranch.

Two thousand men and women, mostly Mexican migrants and Native Americans were recruited by the Southwest Cotton Company. They transformed the desert area into agricultural fields and cultivated thousands of acres of cotton fields. Litchfield took an interest in the community which he established and in 1917, he established a cemetery for the employees of the Goodyear Farms and the Wigwam Resort. The cemetery was first called the "Pioneer Cemetery" and later changed to "Litchfield Cemetery".

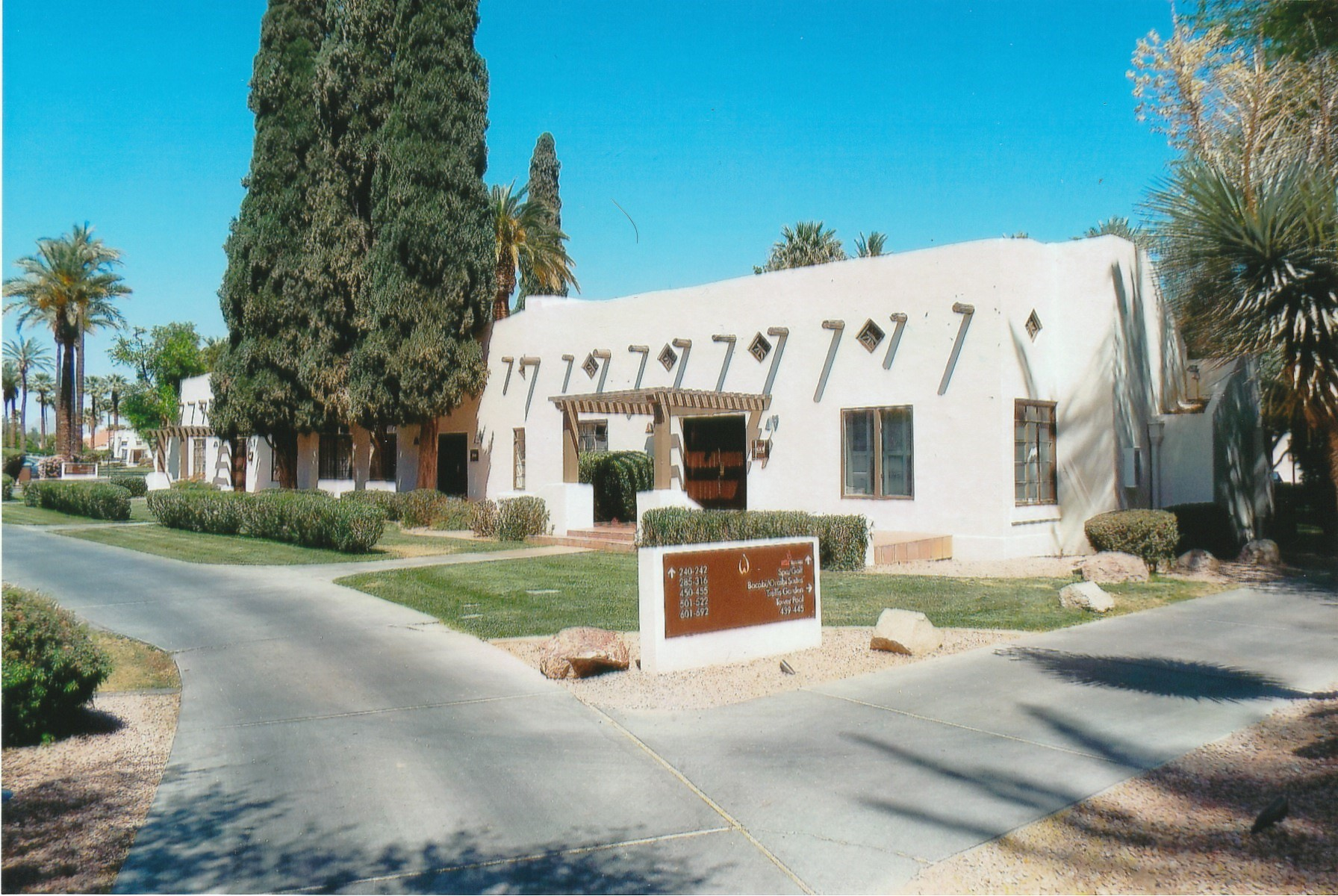
The original Wigwam Organizational House built in 1918

In 1918, he had the Wigwam Organizational House built by The Goodyear Tire & Rubber Company as lodging for local ranch suppliers. This was the first building of what was to become the Wigwam Hotel which opened its doors in 1929. In 1919, he had the St. Thomas Mission Church a.k.a. "St. Thomas Aquinas Mission Church" built. The church was built primarily for the Mexican farm workers of the Southwest Cotton Company. That same year he oversaw the construction of the Litchfield Elementary Schools. In 1920, the Litchfield Train Station, a feeder station of the Southern-Pacific Line, near U.S. Route 80 (today Maricopa County 85) and Litchfield Road was established.

On one occasion Litchfield was in a gambling casino in Ensenada, Mexico. He became fascinated by the interior of the casino and made a detailed drawing of it. He used it as a model for the sanctuary of the Church at Litchfield Park which was built in 1938 by the Goodyear Tire & Rubber Company crew.

== President of the Goodyear Tire and Rubber Company ==
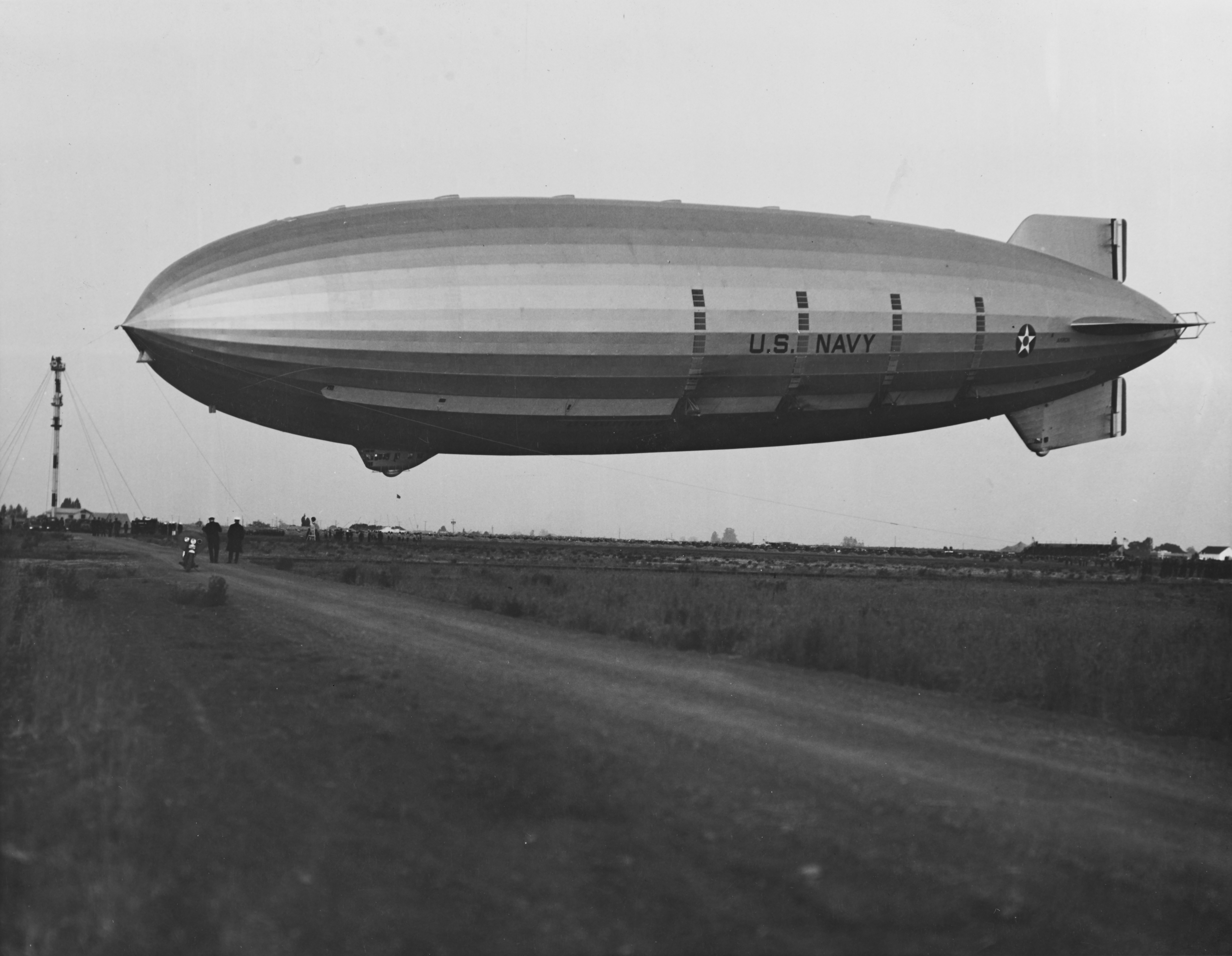
The USS Akron

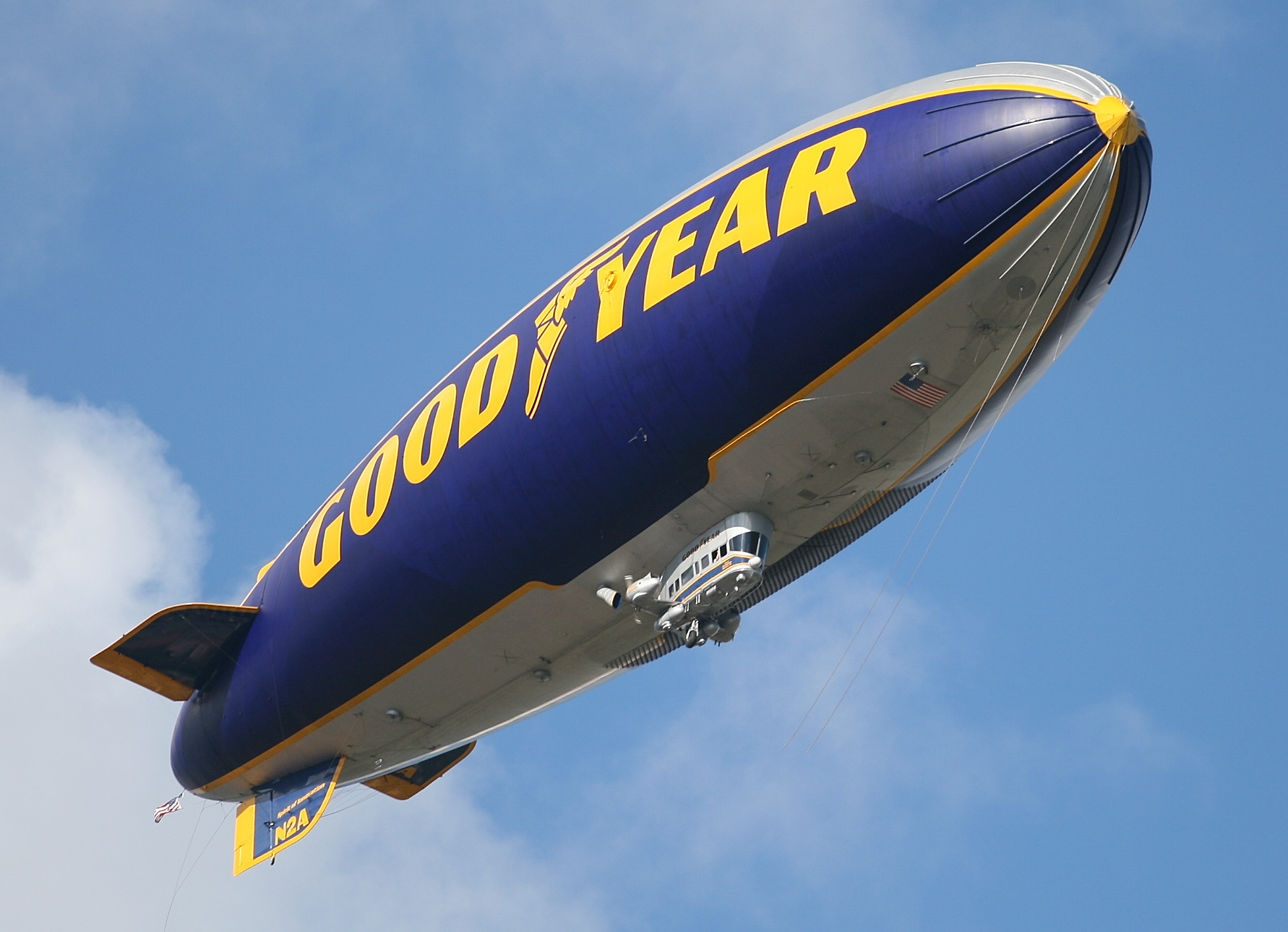
The Spirit of Innovation Goodyear blimp

By 1924, Litchfield was Vice President of the Goodyear Co. That same year he forged a joint venture with the German Luftschiffbau Zeppelin Company. The two companies built two Zeppelins in the United States. The Goodyear-Zeppelin Corporation was created to facilitate the relationship. In 1926, Litchfield went on to become the president of the Goodyear-Zeppelin Corporation. As company president, he was responsible for the company's expansion and set up plants, factories and plantations in foreign countries such as Java, Sumatra, the Philippines, and Mexico. He expanded the company's operation in South America, Europe, and Africa.

The two airships built by the Goodyear-Zeppelin Corporation were the USS Akron a.k.a. "ZRS-4" and the USS Macon a.k.a. (ZRS-5). Both were designed by chief designer Karl Arnstein and a team of experienced German airship engineers.

The construction of the USS Akron airship began on October 31, 1929, at the Goodyear Airdock in Akron, Ohio. A special hangar had to be built because this ship was larger than any other airship previously built in the United States. The airship was launched on August 8, 1931. Construction of the USS Macon began in May 1931 and launched on March 11, 1933. Both airships were sold to the United States Department of the Navy.

In 1930, Litchfield became the chairman of the board of the Goodyear Tire and Rubber Company, thus becoming the company's first CEO. He was featured on the cover of Time Magazine on August 10, 1931, Vol. XVIII, No. 6.

The partnership between the Goodyear Co. and the Luftschiffbau Zeppelin Company ended after World War II began, but the American company continued to build blimps under the Goodyear name.

== World War II ==
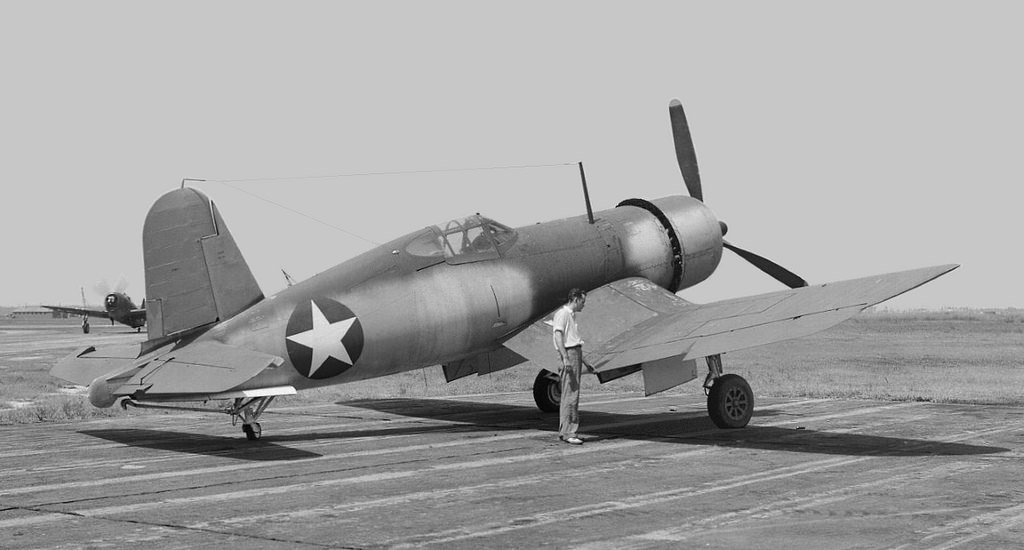
An early F4U-1 showing the "birdcage" canopy with rearwards production cockpit location

In 1943, he was responsible for the establishment of a research and development department in the company. The department developed various items which would be of great help to the United States military during its involvement in World War II. Among the items produced were the first practical airplane tire, long-haul conveyor belts, hydraulic disc brakes for airplanes, the first pneumatic truck tire, and a bullet-sealing fuel tank for military airplanes. The research department provided work for 250 research scientists. Under his direction the company became the 10 largest company producing aircraft and airplane parts during the war era, in the United States. It employed 37,000 workers. The company manufactured F4U Corsair fighter planes for the U.S. Military.

== Organizer, volunteer, and philanthropist, Akron Area Council, Boy Scouts of America ==
Paul Litchfield first became involved in Scouting in 1913, 3 years after the founding of the Boy Scouts of America. He helped organize the Akron Council (later the Akron Area Council and now the Great Trail Council). He served as Council President from 1918-1919 and was a member of the council Board of Trustees.

When H. Karl Butler died in 1926, he left 414 acres to the Akron Area Council for Camp Manatoc but with the condition that the council raise $100,000 within five years to expand and improve the quality of the camp. In 1931, Litchfield and the Goodyear Tire and Rubber Company donated $38,888.88; the B.F. Goodrich Company donated $33,333.34; and the Firestone Tire and Rubber Company donated $27,777.78 fulfilling the condition of Butler's will.

Under Litchfield's leadership, Goodyear sponsored numerous Cub Scout Packs and Boy Scout, Sea Scout, Air Scout, Girl Scout, and Girl Scout Mariner (the Girl Scout version of Sea Scouts) troops. For example, in 1945, the Wingfoot Clan reported that Goodyear has sponsored troops for 32 years (since 1913) and currently sponsors 15 Scout units, 554 boys, and 150 leaders in the Akron area and more elsewhere. While less frequently mentioned, Goodyear also sponsored units for African-American Scouts during the time of segregation. There are hundreds of short articles about all of their activities in the Wingfoot Clan, the company newsletter.

In 1941, Litchfield, a member of the national BSA executive committee and father of the BSA Air Scout program, announced the formation Air Scouts. Litchfield had overseen the more than five years of planning that went into the formation of the Air Scout program. Air Scouts were not trained as pilots. They engaged in all standard Scouting activities and additionally learned aspects of ground training, aviation history, weather, and many other aspects of aviation. In June 1942, Goodyear announced that Squadron 1, the first Air Scout Squadron in the country, had been chartered in Akron with 38 boys, aged 15 or older. In 1945, Goodyear chartered a second squadron, Air Scout Squadron 6.

Litchfield received the Silver Beaver Award in 1931, the Silver Antelope Award in 1944, and the Silver Buffalo Award in 1945. He built and donated the Goodyear Scout Lodge and made possible The Litchfield Scout Award. The Goodyear Sea Scouts and Mariners used a ship called the P. W. Litchfield, which was based in Turkeyfoot Lake.

== Later years ==
Litchfield retired in 1956 and continued to live with his wife and family in his ranch "Rancho La Loma" located on a hill in the town which now bears his name and along Litchfield Road. The property had four additional "cottages" for family members besides the main house. In 1958, Litchfield's health began to take a turn for the worse and he and his wife moved to a new house on Fairway Drive, close to a golf course.

On March 18, 1959, Paul Weeks Litchfield died in his home. He was survived by his wife and two daughters, Katherine and Edith. Mrs. Litchfield moved to Akron, Ohio and died in 1972 at the age of 92. Edith and her husband Wally Denny resided in "Rancho La Loma" until their deaths in 2001 and 2008, respectively. The Edith and Wallace Denny estate offered to the City of Litchfield Park "La Loma homestead" as a gift.

== Accolades ==
Arizona named an important avenue "Litchfield Road" in his honor and Kent State University presents the Paul W. Litchfield Goodyear Scholarship to students entering the university and its regional campuses. To qualify for this award, one of the student's parents must be an employee with five or more years of service with, or a retiree of, the Goodyear Tire and Rubber Company or one of its domestic subsidiaries. The selection for this renewable award is based on the students academic records, national test scores and financial need. In 1959, Akron, Ohio named a new middle school Paul Weeks Litchfield Middle School (usually referred to Litchfield Middle School and later as Litchfield Junior High School). The school was demolished in 2013 and replaced in 2016 by Litchfield Community Learning Center. Gadsden, Alabama honored Litchfield by naming a school, Litchfield High School, after him in 1970. This was due to the fact that in 1929, Litchfield had a plant built in Gadsden providing the people of that town with employment. Litchfield Park, which was founded in 1916, was incorporated as a city in 1987. The lake at Great Trail Council's Camp Manatoc is named Lake Litchfield.

== Written works ==
Litchfield authored various books including his autobiography Industrial Voyage which was published in 1954. The following books are among those authored by Paul W. Litchfield:

- The Industrial Republic: A Study in Industrial Economics; Publisher: Forgotten Books; ISBN 9781330997765.
- Industrial Voyage; My Life as an Industrial Lieutenant; Publisher: Doubleday; First edition; ASIN B000UCJGX0.
- Why? – Why America has no Rigid Airships; Publisher: Corday & Gross, Columbus, Ohio; First edition; ASIN B000PDYG8O.
- Autumn Leaves: Reflections of an Industrial Lieutenant; Publisher Corday & Gross, Cleveland Ohio, 1945.

== See also ==
- Litchfield Park
- Goodyear Tire and Rubber Company
- Goodyear Farms Historic Cemetery
- John C. Lincoln

=== Arizona pioneers ===
- Mansel Carter
- Bill Downing
- Henry Garfias
- Winston C. Hackett
- John C. Lincoln
- Joe Mayer
- William John Murphy
- Wing F. Ong
- Levi Ruggles
- Sedona Schnebly
- Michael Sullivan
- Trinidad Swilling
- Ora Rush Weed
- Henry Wickenburg
