= Boston Land and Manufacturing Company Store =

- U.S. National Register of Historic Places
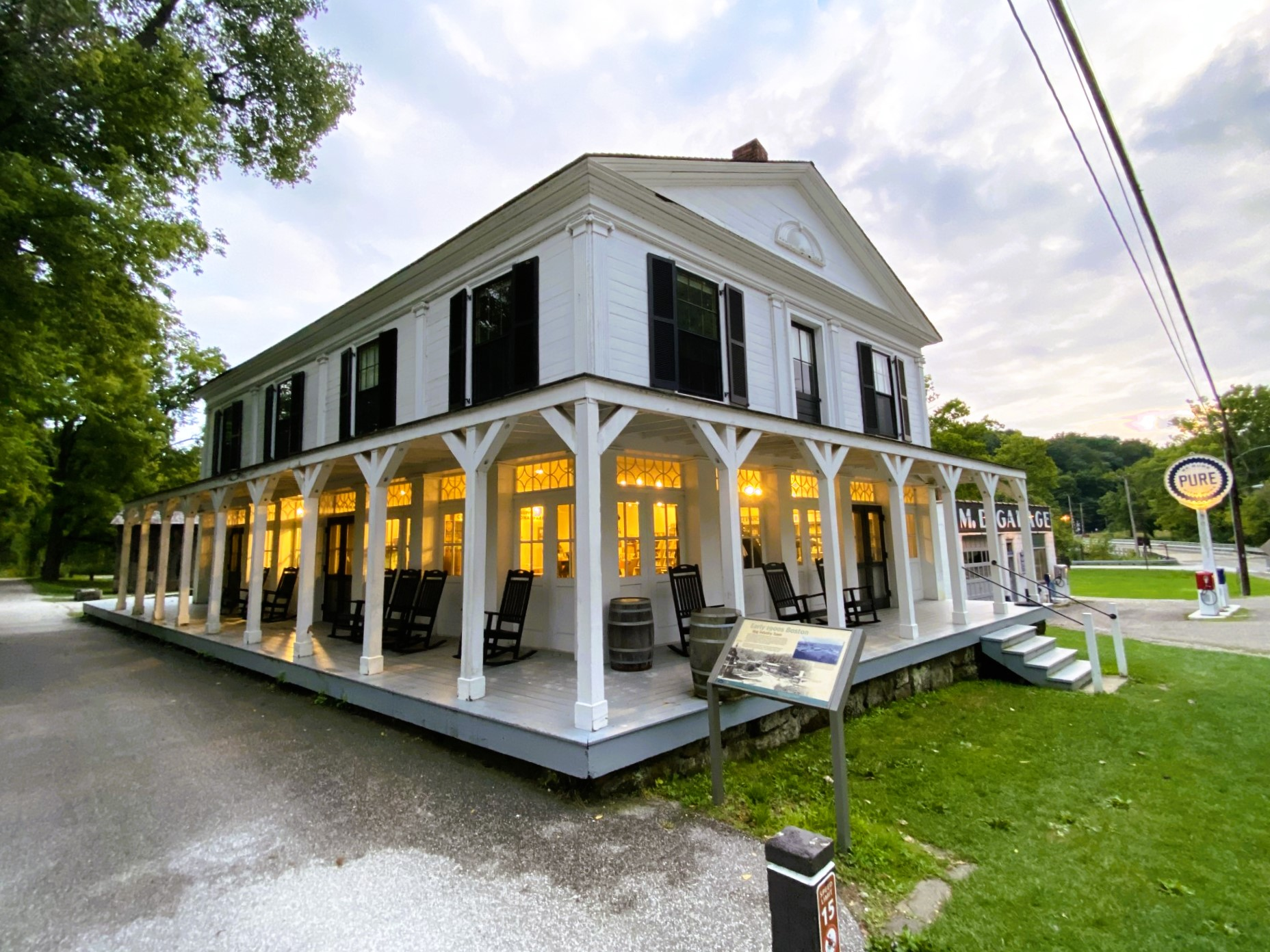

- Location within Ohio
- Location: 1556 Boston Mills Rd., Boston, Ohio
- Coordinates: 41°15′48″N 81°33′31″W
- Area: 1 acre (0.40 ha)
- Built: 1825
- Architectural style: Federal, Greek Revival
- MPS: Ohio and Erie Canal TR
- NRHP reference No.: 79000300
- Added to NRHP: December 11, 1979

The Boston Land and Manufacturing Company Store, also known as the Jim Brown Tavern, is a historic building at 1556 Boston Mills Road in Boston, Ohio. The store was built in 1835 for the Boston Land and Manufacturing Company, which used it as a general store and post office until 1904. The building's design includes elements of the Federal and Greek Revival styles. It features a gable front with a fanlight, a wraparound front porch, and Ionic pilasters. In 1905, the store was converted to a private house. It is currently a park store for Cuyahoga Valley National Park and a trailhead on the Ohio and Erie Canal Towpath Trail.

The building was added to the National Register of Historic Places on December 11, 1979. Its nomination misidentified the building as the Jim Brown Tavern, an earlier building built nearby which is no longer standing. The building was also included in the Boston Mills Historic District, which corrected the earlier mistake during its nomination process.
