= Vanessa Dobos =

United States Air Force airman

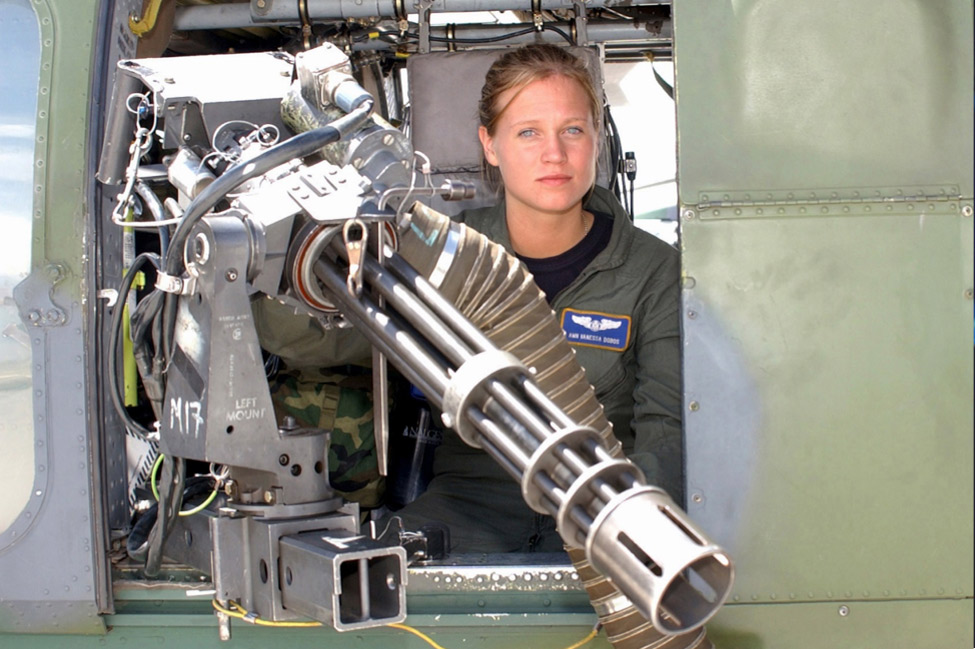
- Dobos looking out the crew door of a USAF HH-60G Pave Hawk helicopter, equipped with a 7.62mm M134 Minigun machine gun.
- Military career
- Branch: US Air Force

In 2003, Airman 1st Class Vanessa Dobos became the first female aerial gunner in the U.S. Air Force. This position was previously closed to women. She trained with the 58th Training Squadron at Kirtland Air Force Base in New Mexico. Her first duty station was at Nellis AFB in Nevada, and she served with distinction in Iraq and Afghanistan.

== Early life ==
Dobos was raised in Valley View, Ohio.

== Military service ==
Her interest in the military was inspired by her father, whom she describes as a 'history buff.' She was interested in joining the military only if she could have a flying-related job. When she learned of the 1A7X1 Aerial Gunner role, she was unaware that it had only recently been open to females. "Just the title caught my eye," she said.

After basic military training, while at the basic aerial gunner course at Kirtland AFB in New Mexico, Dobos finally realized she was on her way to becoming the first female gunner.

"I went from being just another airman in the crowd to someone who people would always be watching and analyzing," she told Airman Magazine in 2003. "In some ways, I was afraid that people in the helicopter world were already prepared to be disappointed in me. I figured there were some people with hard feelings about a girl in the job. I was determined not to let them down."

Dobos was deployed to the Persian Gulf in 2003 and Afghanistan in 2004.

== Pave Hawk Crash - Afghanistan ==
As a Senior Airman, Dobos was the gunner on a Pave Hawk crew that was assigned to the 66th Rescue Squadron in October 2004.

On 20 October 2004, her aircraft was on a mission to medivac a local Afghani national who had been shot while working as a member of the Joint Election Monitoring Board overseeing Afghan elections. While in a hover over the LZ, the aircraft encountered severe brownout conditions at a higher altitude than is common. When the pilot attempted to leave the dust cloud, the aircraft struck the side of a nearby hill and slid up the hill before rolling down it 5-7 times, coming to rest on its right side approximately 180 feet (55 m) below the point of impact.

The flight engineer, Jesse M. Samek of Rogers, Arkansas, was killed in the crash.
