= Botzum Farm =

- U.S. National Register of Historic Places
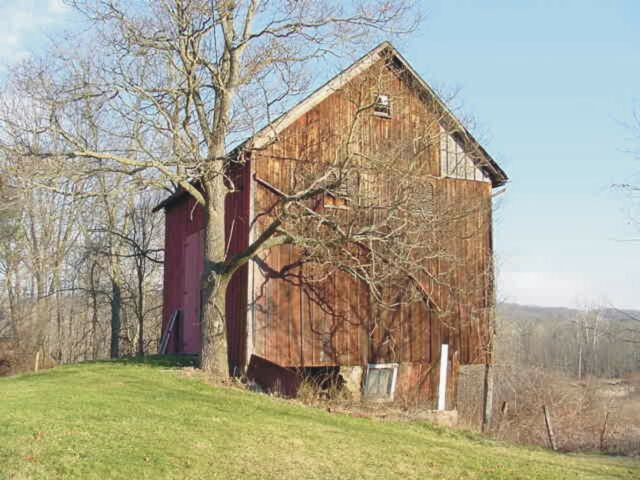
- The 1884 barn

- Location within Ohio
- Location: 3486 Riverview Rd., Cuyahoga Falls, Ohio
- Area: 23.5 acres (9.5 ha)
- MPS: Agricultural Resources of the Cuyahoga Valley MPS
- NRHP reference No.: 99001271
- Added to NRHP: October 21, 1999

The Botzum Farm is a historic farm at 3486 Riverview Road in Cuyahoga Valley National Park in the U.S. state of Ohio. The farm was founded by the Botzum family, who immigrated to the United States from Germany in the 1830s. According to family history, the family lost their possessions to a pirate attack during their voyage to the U.S., and they were nearly abducted by South American slavers in New York City before traveling to Ohio. While the family purchased the land from the Connecticut Land Company in the 1840s, the current buildings on the farm were not built until after Conrad Botzum settled there in 1883. The farm raised livestock and grew crops, and particularly outpaced its neighbors in the former; at one point it had 65 sheep and 31 hogs, both several times higher than the local average. The farmstead's main buildings are the 1906 concrete block farmhouse, the 1884 Pomeranian barn, and the 1898 bank barn; it also includes two summer kitchens, a privy, a shed, and a well.

The farm was added to the National Register of Historic Places on October 21, 1999.
