= H. Karl Butler =

American businessman and philanthropist

Karl Butler
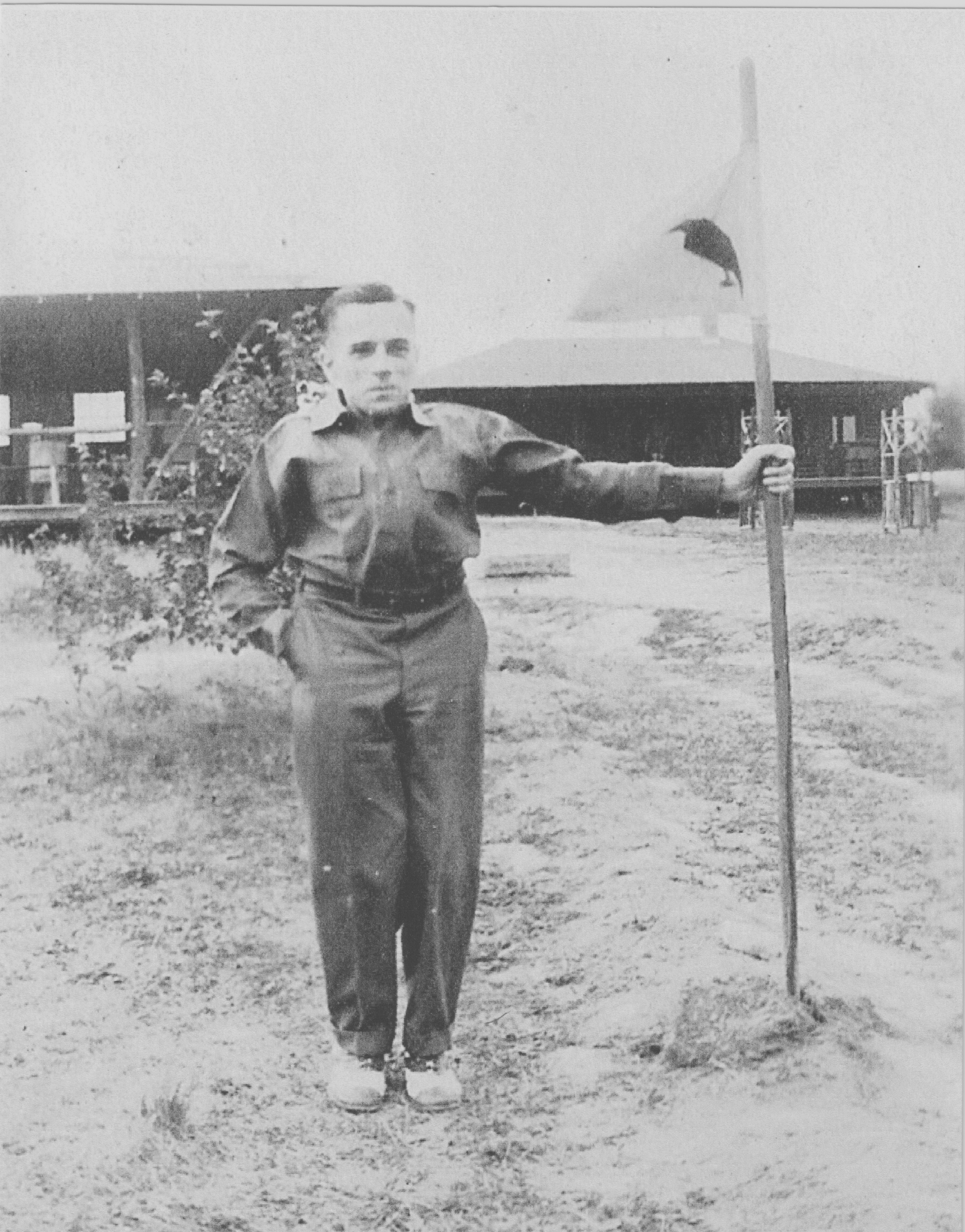
- Born: 18 July 1882; Akron, Ohio, US
- Died: 13 December 1926; Akron, Ohio, US
- Resting place: Glendale Cemetery, Akron, Ohio
- Education: Buchtel College
- Known for: Camp Manatoc and Camp Butler

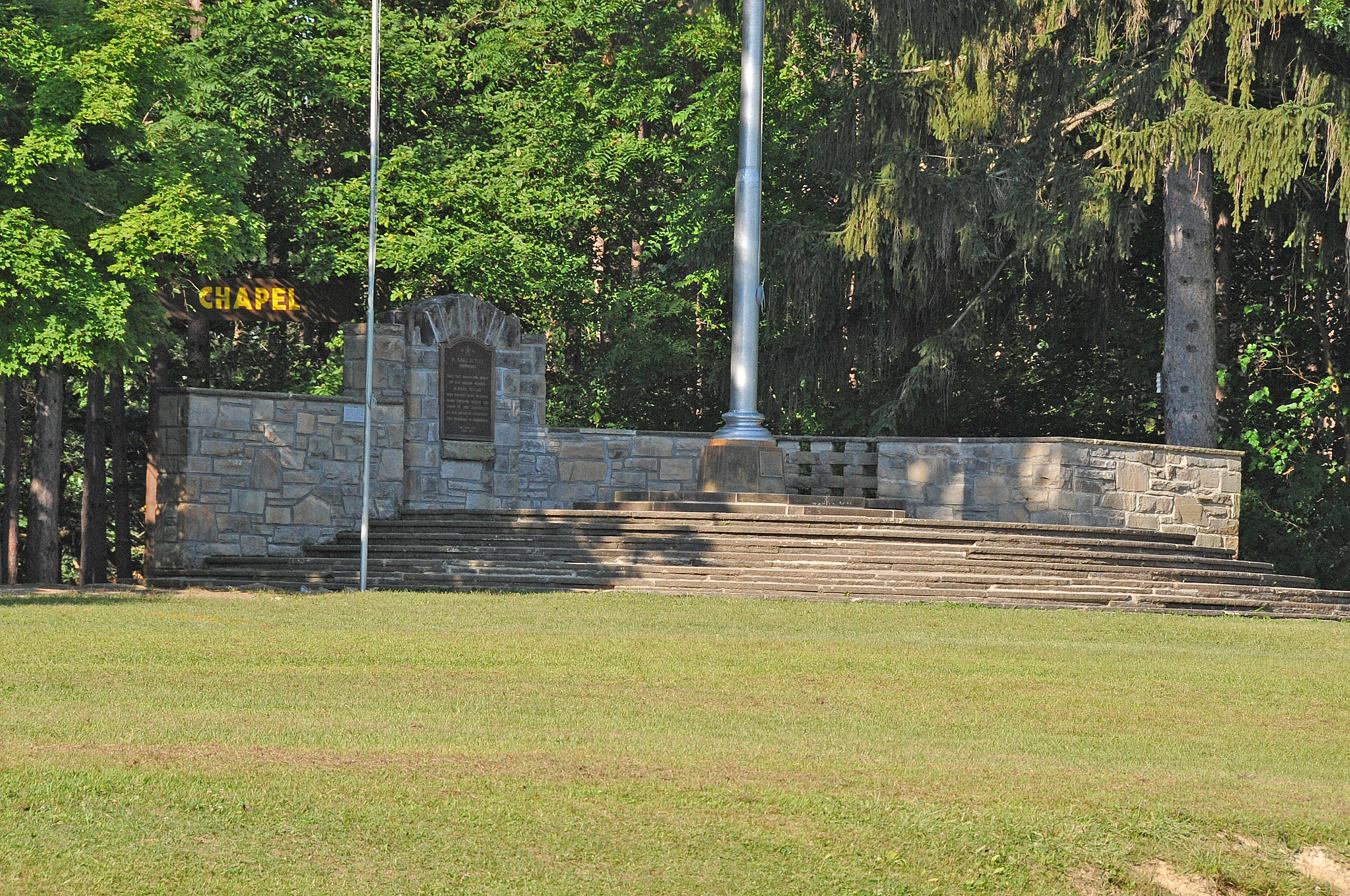
H Karl Butler memorial at Camp Manatoc

H. Karl Butler or Henry Karl Butler (18 July 1882 – 13 December 1926) was an American businessman and philanthropist. He was the grandson of Edwin Merrill, an Akron clay products industrialist. Butler was born with Pott's disease, which is tuberculosis of the spine. He was disabled, his back was deformed, he walked with a limp, and he suffered constant joint pain. He was a businessman, political aide, philanthropist, and a benefactor to the Akron Area Council (now Great Trail Council), Boy Scouts of America. He donated the land on which Akron Area Council built Camp Manatoc, which opened in 1923.

== Early years ==
Butler grew up in Akron and acquired a love for camping and the outdoors through George Atwater, his pastor at the Church of Our Savior. Atwater created an organization for boys called the Young Crusaders. In 1900, Butler went on the group's first campout, 10 years before Scouting officially started in the US.

David Atwater, who was George's son, wrote in 1980:

I knew Mr. Karl Butler and he always recalled that as a boy he went camping with my father, the Rev. George Atwater, who led an organization known as the Young Crusaders who camped on the Hale Farm near Peninsula .... My father used to think that the good times Karl Butler had there influenced him in his generosity to the Scouts and to Manatoc.

== Political aide ==
After attending Buchtel College (which later became the University of Akron), Butler became the personal aide to the senator from Ohio, Charles W.F. Dick.

== Businessman ==
In 1905, Butler and his brother Merrill moved to Cuba to run a sugar plantation. He left Cuba and returned to Akron by early 1911 and went to work in the clay products family business.

== Outdoorsman ==
Butler enjoyed the outdoors and loved camping. In 1919, he purchased 200 acres of land near Peninsula, Ohio. He camped on the land and invited his friends as often as he could.

Merrill Butler, who then lived in California, was interested in Scouting. During a visit early in the 1920s, Merrill took Karl to visit Pasadena Council's new camp, Camp Cherry Valley on Santa Catalina Island (California).

== Early Scouting in Akron ==
The Scouting movement was founded in England by Robert Baden-Powell in the early 1900s. Specifically, Baden-Powell held a camp for boys at Brownsea Island in 1907 and published Scouting for Boys in 1908, which was based on his 1899 publication Aids to Scouting, with the latter written from a military perspective and the former written for boys. The Boy Scouts of America was founded in 1910 by publisher William D. Boyce after learning of the Scouting movement during a trip to London. The first Akron Boy Scout troop was founded in 1910 by Reverend H. W. Lowrey of the First Presbyterian Church. In 1914, Akron Ohio had a Scout Council, and in 1916, it hired its first professional. Scouting grew quickly in Akron, because Akron and its rubber industry were rapidly growing. As the number of Scouts grew, so did the need for a camp. A special committee was organized to find land for a camp, but it was unsuccessful. The committee explained their situation to a group of prominent Akron leaders. One of those leaders was Parke Kolbe, the President of the University of Akron and Karl Butler's close friend. Kolbe mentioned the need for a camp to Butler, who offered the use of his land near Peninsula, Ohio, just north of Akron, in what is now the Cuyahoga Valley National Park.

== Camp Manatoc ==
Camp Manatoc officially opened on Butler's property in 1923 with approximately 50 boys. "Manatoc" means "a high outlook" or "high plateau" in the Algonquin language, and at that time was a place where there was a spectacular view of the Cuyahoga River Valley.

Butler often camped near the dining hall. Garland Christian, a camper in 1924, stated:

He was a nice man and very polite and he would talk to you and treat you nice. I remember he sat in some kind of chair because of his back. I don't believe he had full use of his legs if I remember right. I don't know whether we had wheelchairs in those days. But he was in some kind of a cart of something that would get him around.

And he stayed there in his own tent. Obviously, he didn't get around much because of his condition. He just would sit a lot. But every once in a while, he'd come down to the parade grounds when they were having retreat or something special and he would make his appearance.

It was always ‘Mr. Butler.' We never called him Karl.

Butler died in 1926. In his will, he left the camp property (by then, 414 acres) to the Akron Area Council, but with a condition. Butler required the council to raise $100,000 within five years to expand and improve the quality of the camp. Specifically, the provision was that the council could buy the land for one dollar if it could raise the $100,000 in five years. If not, the council would be required to purchase the land from the estate. Plans were quickly underway to raise the money. In 1929, the Great Depression devastated the American economy hindering fundraising.

By 1931, the leaders of the council realized that despite the economy, they needed to move forward with raising the $100,000 or lose the camp property. They also realized that they had outgrown the present camp and needed to build an entirely new one, which would be located on the southern part of the property. The three major Akron rubber companies (Goodyear Tire and Rubber Company, Firestone Tire and Rubber Company, and B.F. Goodrich Company) contributed the entire $100,000 with the stipulation that the councils raise and additional $125,000, giving the council at least $225,000 to build a new camp. The campaign was successful and raised more than enough to build the second Camp Manatoc, which was dedicated in June 1932.

== Death ==
Butler fell ill in early December 1926 during his tenure as president of the Akron Area Council, BSA. He had plans to leave for Washington DC on December 11 to attend a dinner with friends from his days with Senator Dick. He was too ill to travel and cancelled on December 10. As a Christian Scientist, he did not seek medical help. On December 12, he called for the secretary of the Akron Area Council and dictated his will. He died the next morning on December 13, 1926 of pneumonia related to myocarditis. Butler was buried in the family plot at Glendale Cemetery in Akron. A memorial service was held at Camp Manatoc. In 1931, a stone memorial was dedicated in Butler's memory at Camp Manatoc.

== Legacy ==
During his last years, Butler worked to acquire more land adjacent to the existing camp. As of 1962, the Manatoc Scout Reservation, now nearly 600 acres, consists of two adjacent camps: Camp Manatoc and Camp Butler, the latter named to honor Karl Butler. In 2023, Great Trail Council celebrated the one-hundredth anniversary of the opening of Camp Manatoc.
