= Wilson Feed Mill =

- U.S. National Register of Historic Places
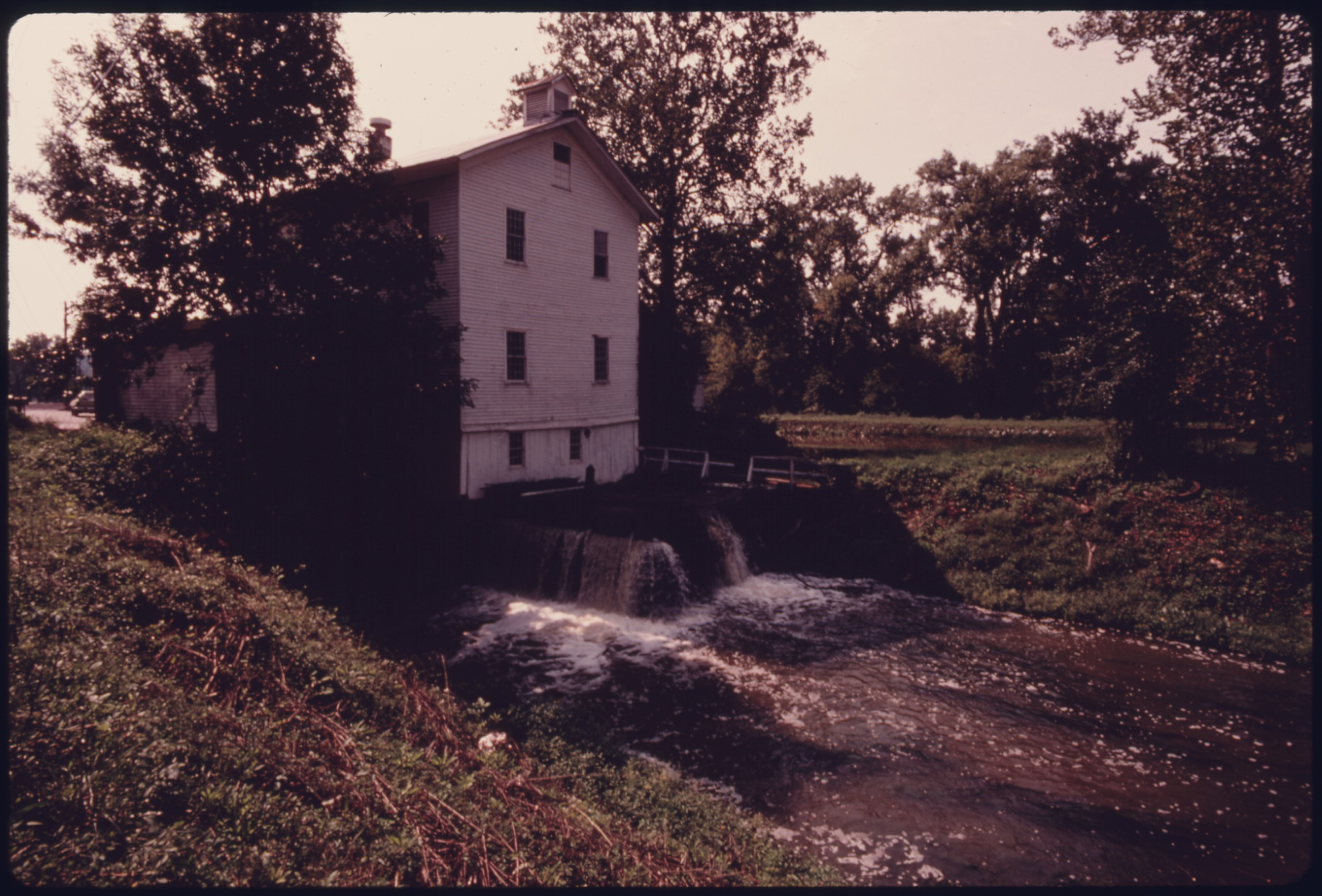

- Location within Ohio
- Location: 7604 Canal Rd., Valley View, Ohio
- Coordinates: 41°21′22″N 81°35′48″W
- Area: 1 acre (0.40 ha)
- Built: 1855
- MPS: Ohio and Erie Canal TR
- NRHP reference No.: 79000298
- Added to NRHP: December 17, 1979

Wilson Feed Mill, also known as Alexander's Mill, is a historic gristmill at 7604 Canal Road in Cuyahoga Valley National Park in the U.S. state of Ohio. Andrew and Robert Alexander built the mill on the Ohio and Erie Canal in 1855 to grind flour for local farmers. At the time, the Cleveland area was a major wheat-producing region, in part because the canal let farmers ship flour across the Great Lakes. In 1900, Thomas and Emma Wilson bought the mill and expanded it to serve larger businesses. They also began grinding animal feed instead of flour at the mill in order to serve the growing feed market. The mill was the last operating mill in the Cuyahoga Valley and ran on water power through 1970.

The mill was added to the National Register of Historic Places on December 17, 1979.
