= Valley View, Ohio =

- Village
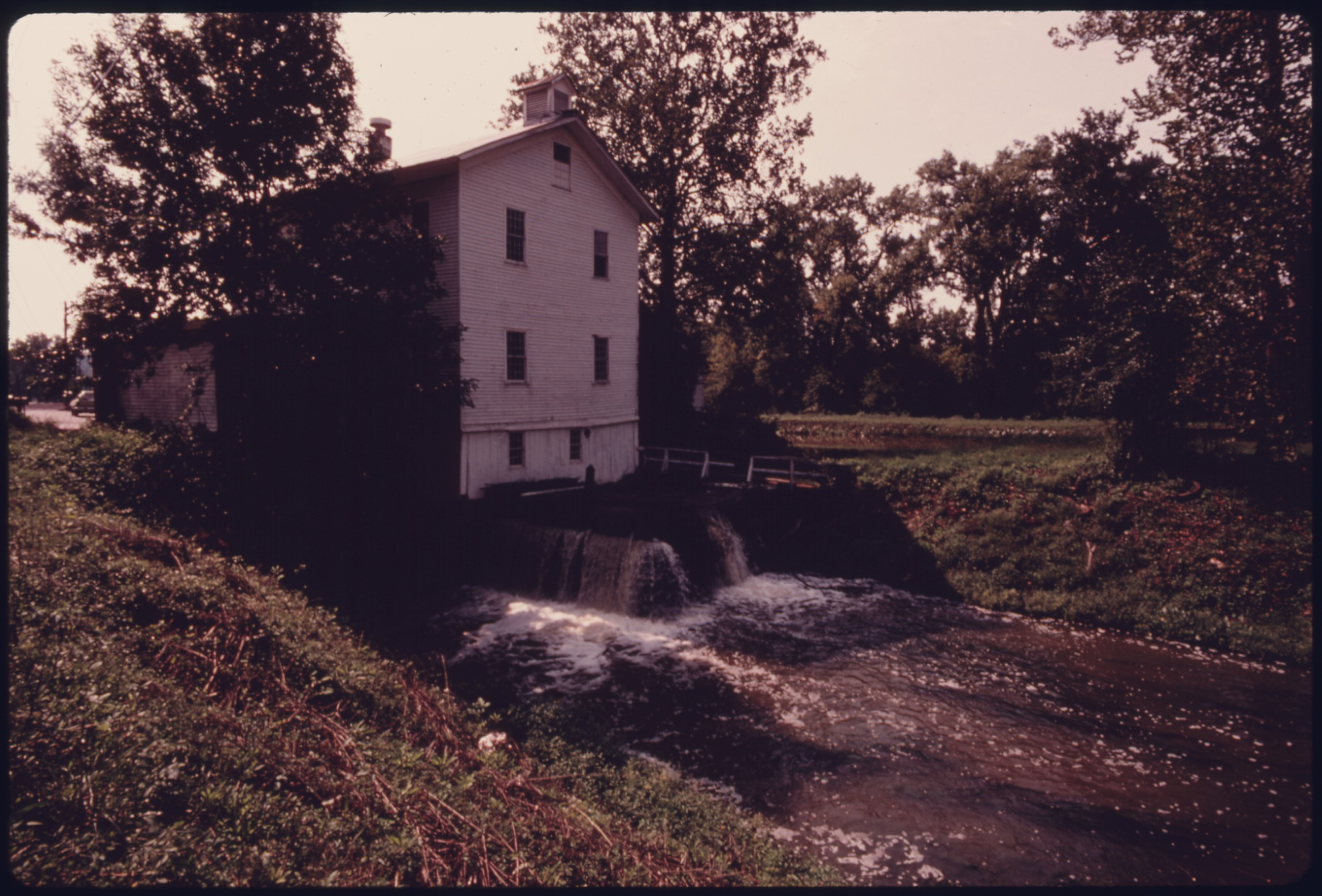
- Wilson Feed Mill
- Interactive map of Valley View, Ohio
- Location within Ohio Location within the United States
- Coordinates: 41°23′7″N 81°37′4″W
- Country: United States
- State: Ohio
- County: Cuyahoga
- Incorporated: 1919

Government
  - Type: Mayor-council
  - Mayor: Matthew March (R)

Area
  - Total: 5.56 sq mi (14.41 km^{2})
  - Land: 5.43 sq mi (14.07 km^{2})
  - Water: 0.13 sq mi (0.34 km^{2})
- Elevation: 863 ft (263 m)

Population (2020)
  - Total: 1,897
  - Density: 349.2/sq mi (134.82/km^{2})
- census
- Time zone: UTC-4 (EST)
  - Summer (DST): UTC-4 (EDT)
- Zip code: 44125
- Area code: 216
- FIPS code
- GNIS feature ID
- Website: www.valleyview.net

Valley View is a village in Cuyahoga County, Ohio, United States. The population was 1,897 at the 2020 census. A suburb of Cleveland, it is a part of the Cleveland metropolitan area.

Valley View's name refers to the Cuyahoga River valley, and the town includes part of the Cuyahoga Valley National Park and the Ohio and Erie Canal. It is home to the Valley View Bridge that is on Interstate 480 and crosses the Cuyahoga River.

== History ==
Valley View was incorporated as a village in 1919 after it broke away from Independence, Ohio, after an argument over the location of the schools.

In 2013, a scandal involving the laundering of campaign funding resulted in resignation of Mayor Randall Westfall. In 2014, he was sentenced to eighteen months probation and thirty days in jail after pleading guilty to corruption charges.

== Geography ==
Valley View is located at 41°23′7″N 81°37′4″W (41.385153, -81.617670).

According to the United States Census Bureau, the village has a total area of 5.57 square miles (14.43 km^{2}), of which 5.44 square miles (14.09 km^{2}) is land and 0.13 square miles (0.34 km^{2}) is water.

== Demographics ==
Historical population
Census	Pop.	Note	%±
1920	403		—
1930	594		47.4%
1940	753		26.8%
1950	998		32.5%
1960	1,221		22.3%
1970	1,422		16.5%
1980	1,576		10.8%
1990	2,137		35.6%
2000	2,179		2.0%
2010	2,034		−6.7%
2020	1,897		−6.7%
U.S. Decennial Census

=== 2020 census ===
Valley View village, Ohio – Racial and ethnic composition Note: the US Census treats Hispanic/Latino as an ethnic category. This table excludes Latinos from the racial categories and assigns them to a separate category. Hispanics/Latinos may be of any race.
Race / Ethnicity (NH = Non-Hispanic)	Pop 2000	Pop 2010	Pop 2020	% 2000	% 2010	% 2020
White alone (NH)	2,132	1,953	1,773	97.84%	96.02%	93.46%
Black or African American alone (NH)	7	4	8	0.32%	0.20%	0.42%
Native American or Alaska Native alone (NH)	0	1	0	0.00%	0.05%	0.00%
Asian alone (NH)	15	18	24	0.69%	0.88%	1.27%
Native Hawaiian or Pacific Islander alone (NH)	0	0	1	0.00%	0.00%	0.05%
Other race alone (NH)	7	4	9	0.32%	0.20%	0.47%
Mixed race or Multiracial (NH)	7	28	50	0.32%	1.38%	2.64%
Hispanic or Latino (any race)	11	26	32	0.50%	1.28%	1.69%
Total	2,179	2,034	1,897	100.00%	100.00%	100.00%

=== 2010 census ===
As of the census of 2010, there were 2,034 people, 758 households, and 583 families living in the village. The population density was 373.9 inhabitants per square mile (144.4/km^{2}). There were 790 housing units at an average density of 145.2 per square mile (56.1/km^{2}). The racial makeup of the village was 96.9% White, 0.2% African American, 0.9% Asian, 0.1% Pacific Islander, 0.4% from other races, and 1.4% from two or more races. Hispanic or Latino of any race were 1.3% of the population.

There were 758 households, of which 30.5% had children under the age of 18 living with them, 65.6% were married couples living together, 7.5% had a female householder with no husband present, 3.8% had a male householder with no wife present, and 23.1% were non-families. 19.5% of all households were made up of individuals, and 10.1% had someone living alone who was 65 years of age or older. The average household size was 2.68 and the average family size was 3.09.

The median age in the village was 47.3 years. 21.2% of residents were under the age of 18; 6.6% were between the ages of 18 and 24; 18.8% were from 25 to 44; 37.1% were from 45 to 64; and 16.3% were 65 years of age or older. The gender makeup of the village was 50.6% male and 49.4% female.

=== 2000 census ===
As of the census of 2000, there were 2,179 people, 779 households, and 634 families living in the village. The population density was 386.9 inhabitants per square mile (149.4/km^{2}). There were 794 housing units at an average density of 141.0 per square mile (54.4/km^{2}). The racial makeup of the village was 98.26% White, 0.32% African American, 0.05% Native American, 0.69% Asian, 0.37% from other races, and 0.32% from two or more races. Hispanic or Latino of any race were 0.50% of the population.

There were 779 households, out of which 34.0% had children under the age of 18 living with them, 70.9% were married couples living together, 7.8% had a female householder with no husband present, and 18.6% were non-families. 16.4% of all households were made up of individuals, and 6.8% had someone living alone who was 65 years of age or older. The average household size was 2.80 and the average family size was 3.16.

In the village, the population was spread out, with 24.0% under the age of 18, 7.6% from 18 to 24, 23.8% from 25 to 44, 30.7% from 45 to 64, and 14.0% who were 65 years of age or older. The median age was 42 years. For every 100 females, there were 99.4 males. For every 100 females age 18 and over, there were 95.2 males.

The median income for a household in the village was $64,063, and the median income for a family was $71,080. Males had a median income of $50,521 versus $32,589 for females. The per capita income for the village was $26,560. About 2.8% of families and 3.1% of the population were below the poverty line, including 4.3% of those under age 18 and 3.3% of those age 65 or over.

== Notable person ==
Vanessa Dobos - First female aerial gunner in United States Air Force history.
