= Boston Mills Historic District =

Historic district in Ohio, United States

- U.S. National Register of Historic Places
- U.S. Historic district
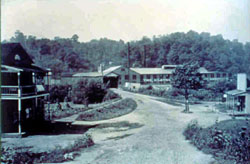
- Historic view of the Boston Mills Historic District

- Location within Ohio Location within the United States
- Location: Roughly, Riverview, Boston Mills and Stanford Roads and Main Street; Boston Mills, Ohio
- Coordinates: 41°15′52″N 81°33′34″W
- Area: 37 acres (15 ha)
- Built: 1880
- Architectural style: Greek Revival, Upright and wing;gabled ell
- NRHP reference No.: 92001490
- Added to NRHP: November 09, 1992

The Boston Mills Historic District is a historic district in the Cuyahoga Valley National Park in Northeast Ohio in the United States. With the opening of the Ohio and Erie Canal in 1827, people began to settle in this vicinity. By 1842, there was a water-powered mill, a large warehouse, a boat-yard, two stores and a hotel, and the population was around 300. A number of houses and other buildings dating back to that period remain.

With the decrease in boat traffic on the canal the village declined somewhat, but its fortunes revived with the construction of the railway in 1880 and the arrival of the Cleveland—Akron Bag Company in 1900. This industry drew in many Polish immigrant workers, and housing and commercial premises were built. Many of these buildings remain today, intermingled with the older properties.

== History ==
Located in the Cuyahoga Valley National Park, the Village of Boston Mills reflects the early 19th-century canal era and the early 20th-century industrial era. With the opening of the Ohio and Erie Canal from Cleveland to Akron in 1827, the settlement along the Cuyahoga River began to grow. By 1842, Boston Mills had a population of approximately 300. A water-powered mill, a large warehouse, two stores and a hotel were some of the businesses in the village. Canal boat building was also an important industry with several dry docks in this inland port. Although the canal is not watered through the village now, one of the system's locks is still extant and several Greek Revival frame buildings date from the early 19th century. The Upwright and Wing house type reflects the extended New England settlement culture. This style is exemplified by the main gable-front two-story section containing a parlor and bedchambers, while the kitchen is located in a perpendicular one-story eave oriented section. The 1836 Boston Company Store, with its Federal and Greek Revival influences, now serves as a Cuyahoga Valley National Park visitor center and canal boat building museum.

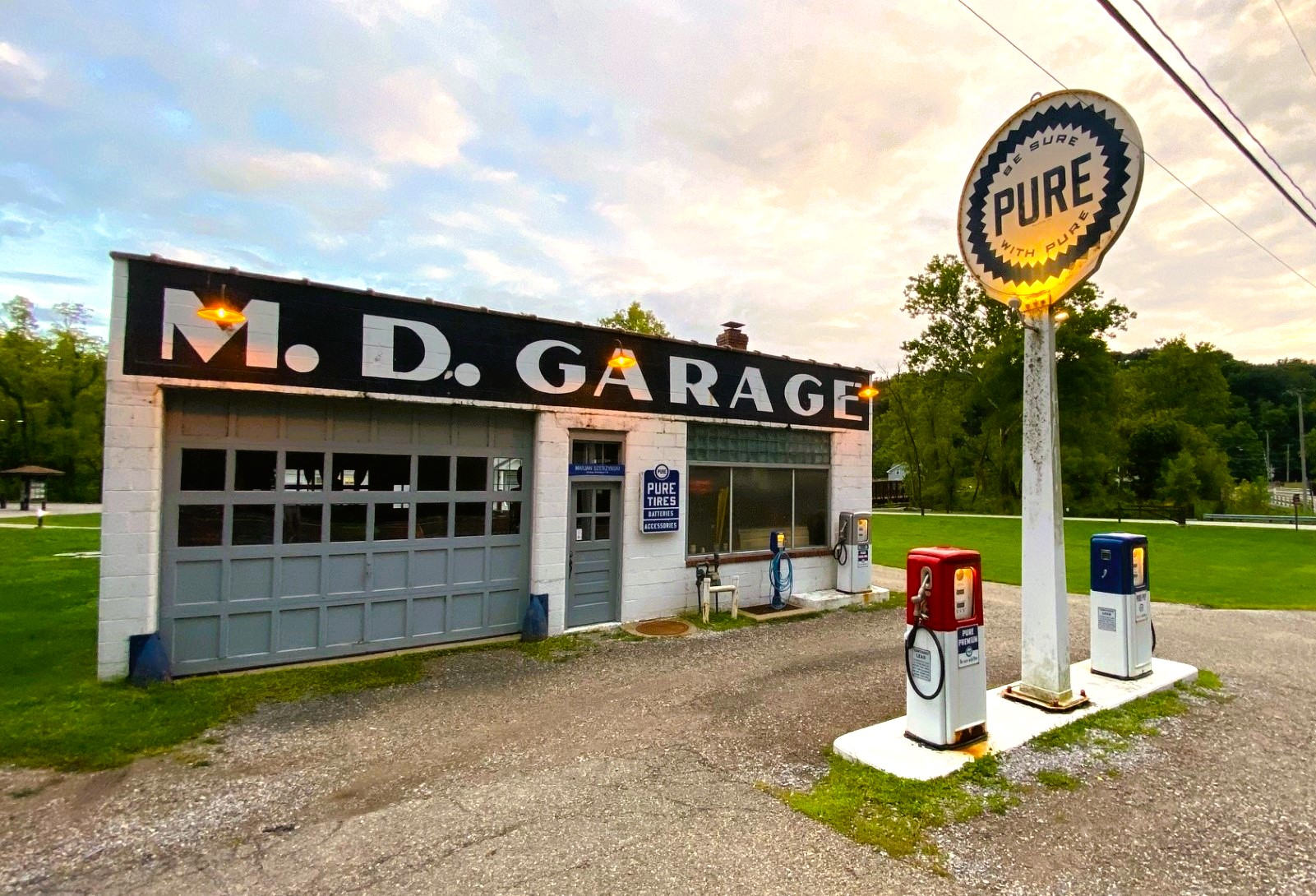
M.D. Garage in 2024

Although the village stagnated with the end of canal packet, or passenger boat era, the arrival of the Valley Railway in 1880 and the Cleveland—Akron Bag Company in 1900 began a new period of growth. Connecting the industries of Cleveland with the coal fields in the south, the Valley Railway provided raw resources and access to markets for industrial operations. The Cleveland—Akron Bag Company brought with it many Polish immigrant workers and new houses—built and sold by the company. Several patterned concrete block houses and a school remain from this era, along with a company store building. A somewhat later 20th-century building, the M. D. Garage has been restored, including period gas pumps and signage, and now houses art exhibits. The compact nature of the village creates streetscapes that juxtapose the buildings from each era.
