= Boston, Summit County, Ohio =

Settlement in Ohio, United States

Coordinates: 41°15′48″N 81°33′34″W

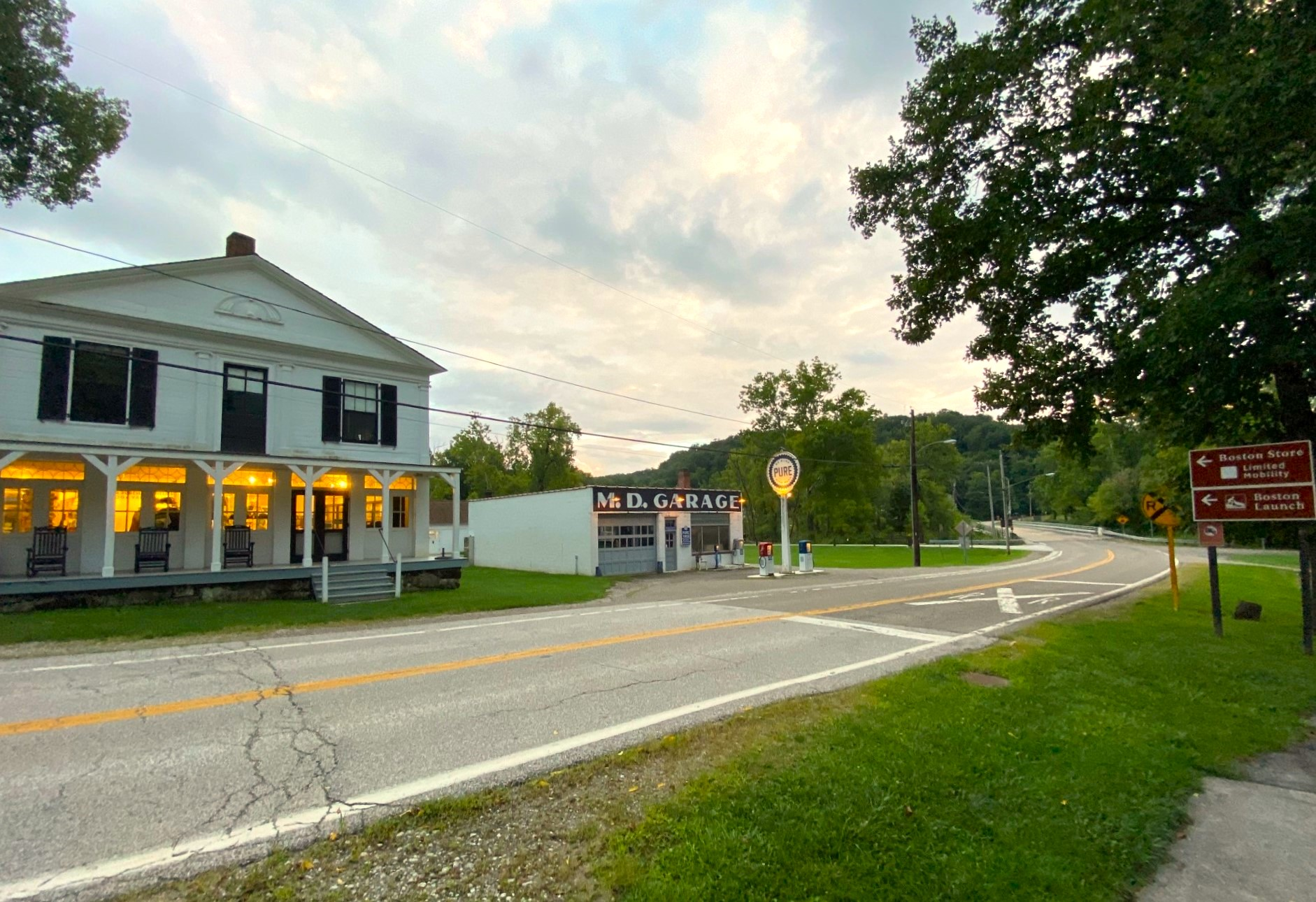
Boston Store and M.D. Garage

Boston is an unincorporated community in Summit County, in the U.S. state of Ohio.

== History ==
The community takes its name from Boston Township. The first settlement at Boston was made in 1820. A sawmill was built at Boston in about 1821. An early variant name was Boston Mills. A post office called Boston was established in 1825, and remained in operation until 1957.

In 1974, a significant portion of the area near Boston was added to what would become Cuyahoga Valley National Park. Owing to delays, several private homes and other buildings purchased by the US park service to be added to national park stood vacant for decades until demolished in 2016. The area is also known as Helltown or Hell Town in relation to this event.
