= Valley Railway =

Former railroad in Ohio, United States

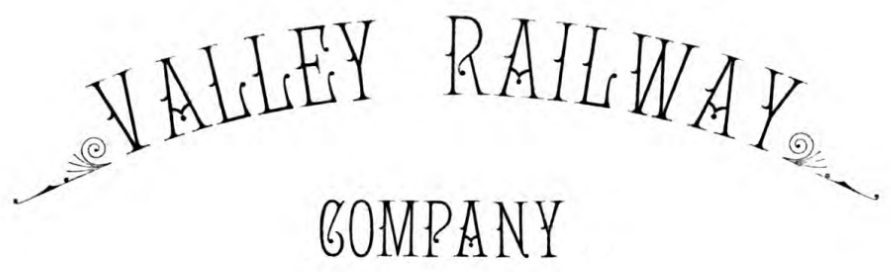

Overview
- Headquarters: Cleveland, Ohio, U.S.
- Dates of operation: August 21, 1871–June 1915
- Successor: Baltimore and Ohio Railroad

Technical
- Track gauge: 4 ft 8 1/2 in (1,435 mm) standard gauge
- Length: 75.47 miles (121.46 km)

The Valley Railway was a shortline railroad which operated between the city of Cleveland and small town of Zoarville in the U.S. state of Ohio. The railroad was founded in 1871, but the first segment of track did not open until 1880 and the line was not completed until 1884. The Baltimore and Ohio Railroad (B&O) obtained a controlling interest in the Valley Railway in 1890. The line went bankrupt in 1895, and was subsequently reorganized as The Cleveland Terminal and Valley Railroad Company (CT&V). The B&O took over operation of the CT&V in 1909, and the company was merged with the B&O in 1915.

Traffic on the road declined significantly after the 1920s. CSX, the B&O's successor, abandoned a third portion of the line in 1984.The National Park Service acquired the line three years later. Since 1975, the Cuyahoga Valley Scenic Railroad (CVSR) has operated seasonal tourist excursion trains on this portion of the line. CSX sold about 12 miles (19 km) of track south of Canton to the Wheeling and Lake Erie Railway in 1992, and 24 miles (39 km) the track between Akron and Canton to Akron's METRO Regional Transit Authority in 2000.

CSX continues some freight operations on the remaining track, which is referred to as the Cleveland, Terminal and Valley Subdivision. The Valley Railway Historic District (a National Register of Historic Places site) encompasses the former Valley Railway from Independence to Akron. The railway also passes through or is adjacent to a number of other sites listed on the National Register.

== Founding the company ==
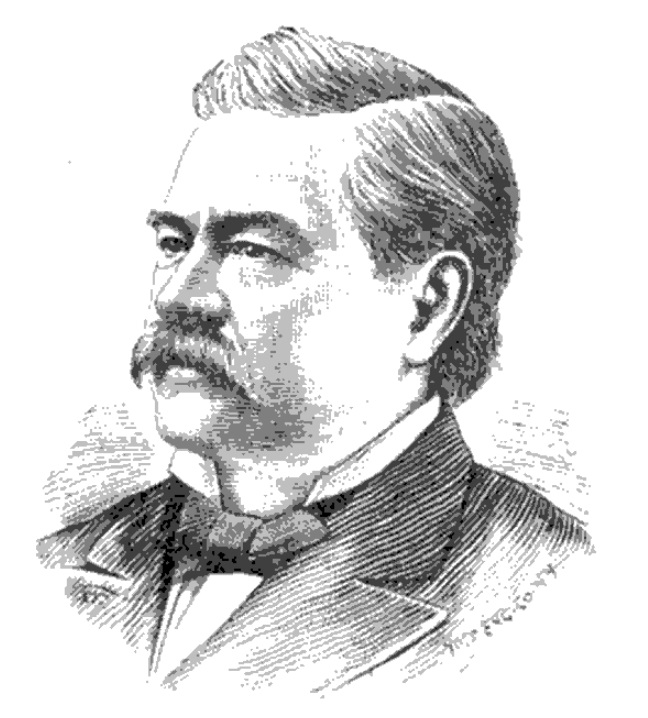
David L. King

The goal of the Valley Railway was to link the industrial centers of Cleveland and Akron, Ohio, with the coal fields of Stark and Tuscarawas counties.

The genesis of the railroad is somewhat unclear, however.

=== Possible antecedent efforts ===
Railway historians Sam Tamburro and Juliet Galonska have written that David L. King, a wealthy attorney in Akron, obtained a state charter for an "Akron and Canton Railway" in 1869. (Note: The state of Ohio lists no charter for an "Akron and Canton Railway" or any similarly named effort between January 1, 1867 and June 30, 1871.) This charter was turned over to the Valley Railway in 1871. Ohio state historian Simeon D. Fess, however, mentions no charter for the Akron & Canton effort. Rather, he says Akron and Canton residents attempted to persuade the B&O to build a line between those two cities. They raised $300,000 ($7,600,000 in 2025 dollars) in 1870 for the purchase of land and for construction. But when the railroad declined to build the line, the citizen-investors turned this money over to the Valley Railway in 1871.

Akron area historian Samuel A. Lane also discusses the fundraising attempt. He notes that King was a primary backer of the effort, but mentions no charter. Lane says the effort to build a railroad ended in the spring of 1871 for reasons which were unclear. The idea, however, gave rise to the Valley Railway. Canton railroad historian Craig Sanders also claims that area residents obtained a state charter for the Akron & Canton. However, Sanders says the line began construction 1873, and then ran out of funds. The route must have been different from the Valley Railway's route, as Sanders says both were being built in 1873. (Note: Elsewhere, Sanders says that another "Akron and Canton Railroad" was planned in the 1830s, but this project was never begun.)

=== Formation of the Valley Railway ===
Whether there were antecedent roads or not, the Valley Railway Company was incorporated in the state of Ohio on August 21, 1871. The incorporators consisted of Henry Chisholm, co-founder and primary investor in the Cleveland Rolling Mill (a steel mill); James Farmer, president of the Ohio National Bank; Samuel Augustus Fuller, founder of the Union Iron Works (a Cleveland iron foundry); David L. King; Nathan P. Payne, a Cleveland coal dealer; and Warrick B. Price, Midwestern real estate developer and former secretary and treasurer of the Milwaukee and Beloit Railroad and the Aetna Iron and Nail Company. The state-issued charter permitted the railroad to construct a line from the city of Cleveland on the shore of Lake Erie south-southeast to the village of Bowerston, Ohio.

The sale of Valley Railway stock began in January 1872. The intent was to sell $150,000 ($4,000,000 in 2025 dollars) in stock in both Akron and Canton, and $500,000 ($13,400,000 in 2025 dollars) in stock in Cleveland. King, the chief organizer of the corporation, raised $191,700 ($4,900,000 in 2025 dollars) from Akron area investors. Sales fell far short in Cleveland, even after the Cleveland Rolling Mill bought $50,000 ($1,300,000 in 2025 dollars) worth of stock.

The company was finally organized on April 24, 1872. Its directors were Farmer, King, and Payne, as well as George Cook (Akron-based director of agricultural implement manufacturer Aultman Miller & Co., and director of the First National Bank of Akron), James A. Saxton (Canton-based founder of the Stark County Bank), John Frederick Seiberling (Akron-based agricultural implement manufacturer), and Andros B. Stone (co-owner of the Cleveland Rolling Mill). The newly-constituted board on May 6 elected Farmer president, King vice president, and incorporator Warrick Price the secretary and treasurer.

== Constructing the Valley Railway ==
The board of directors appointed P.H. Dudley, engineer for the city of Akron, as chief engineer of the Valley Railway. Because the intent of the railroad was to carry very heavy loads of coal to Akron and Cleveland, the board of directors mandated that the route follow a downhill grade between the two cities and that track curves be extremely wide and easy. The board contemplated building a narrow-gauge railway because it would be cheaper. Pressured by King, the board instead opted for the more expensive standard gauge in order to better link with other railroads.

=== Initial construction efforts ===
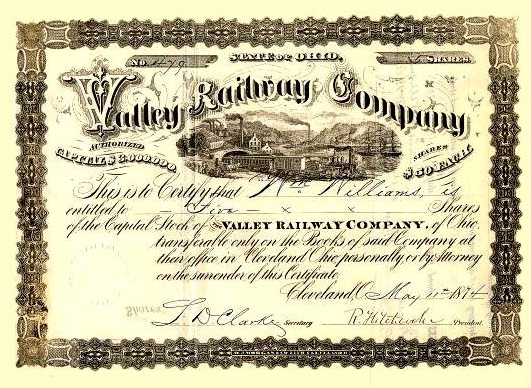
Stock certificate of the Valley Railway

The route was surveyed and land purchased during 1872. On February 3, 1873, the railway contracted with Arthur L. Conger and Nicholas E. Vansickle (both of Akron) to build the railroad. Ground was broken in Springfield Township in Summit County in March 1873. The work initially proceeded very swiftly. By mid-August, two-thirds of the line had been graded (from Canton north almost to Cleveland), contracts for all the bridges had been let, and some bridges had even been partially completed. A financial panic hit in September 1873, creating worldwide economic havoc. The Panic of 1873 forced the railroad to indefinitely suspend construction on May 14, 1874.

By fall 1874, the railroad had run out of money and incurred debts of $150,000 ($1,400,000 in 2025 dollars). To resolve the impasse and get construction going again, David L. King agreed to accept the position of president of the railway. He demanded, however, that the members of the board of directors personally assume financial responsibility for paying off the company's liabilities. The board agreed, and King was elected on September 25, 1874. To raise funds for construction, King traveled to Europe in February 1875, but failed to sell any bonds. Two years passed before King was able to interest bankers and investors in Cleveland and New York City to purchase the $6.5 million ($196,500,000 in 2025 dollars) in bonds the railroad needed to complete work.

Walsh & Moynahan, new contractors, were hired, and work resumed on August 7, 1878. Once grading was complete, track began to be laid. The first rail was laid near Old Forge in Akron (near the present-day intersection of N. Arlington Street and North Street) on October 26, 1878. From Akron, rails were laid north toward Cleveland and south toward Canton; in Cleveland, the company began laying rails south to meet the line coming up from Akron.

=== Completing the line to Canton ===
Work was once again suspended on January 25, 1879, in a dispute over the quality of work provided by Walsh & Moynahan. A new contractor, the firm of Strong & Carey, was hired, and work resumed on June 3, 1879. When the Valley ran low on cash again, the Lake Shore and Michigan Southern Railway (LS&MS) loaned it about $250,000 ($8,600,000 in 2025 dollars) to finish the track. (Note: The LS&MS had close relations with Standard Oil, and shipped much of its oil. The Valley Railway's tracks ran past Standard Oil's large Cleveland refinery, and linked with the LS&MS in downtown Cleveland.)

The 57-mile (92 km) line between Cleveland and Canton was completed on October 27, 1879. The first train (which carried important businessmen, civic leaders, clergy, industrialists, and politicians) ran on the line on January 28, 1880. Regular freight and passenger traffic began running on February 2, 1880.

=== Completing the line to Bowerston ===
Work on the remainder of the railroad slowed appreciably. The Valley Railway crossed the Pennsylvania Railroad's Fort Wayne Line in Canton, and followed the valleys of various streams and creeks to reach Mineral City, Ohio, which it did on July 15, 1882. There, it crossed the Pennsylvania Railroad's Tuscarawas Branch. It reached Valley Junction (Zoarville, Ohio) a few months later. Track work beyond Valley Junction was delayed because the Valley Railway had yet to negotiate trackage rights with the Wheeling and Lake Erie Railroad (W&LE). An agreement was finally reached in late 1882, and became effective January 1, 1883. The remainder of the line was completed swiftly, and in 1884 the Valley Railway between Bowerston and Valley Junction was completed—linking the Valley Railway with the W&LE and points east.

At the time of its completion, the Valley Railway had 75 miles (121 km) of main line track, 19 miles (31 km) of branch track, 35 miles (56 km) of siding, and a 2-mile (3.2 km) spur from Mineral City to a nearby Sieberling-owned coal mine. It linked northeast Ohio's three largest cities, creating a regional transportation corridor.

== Valley Railway operational history ==
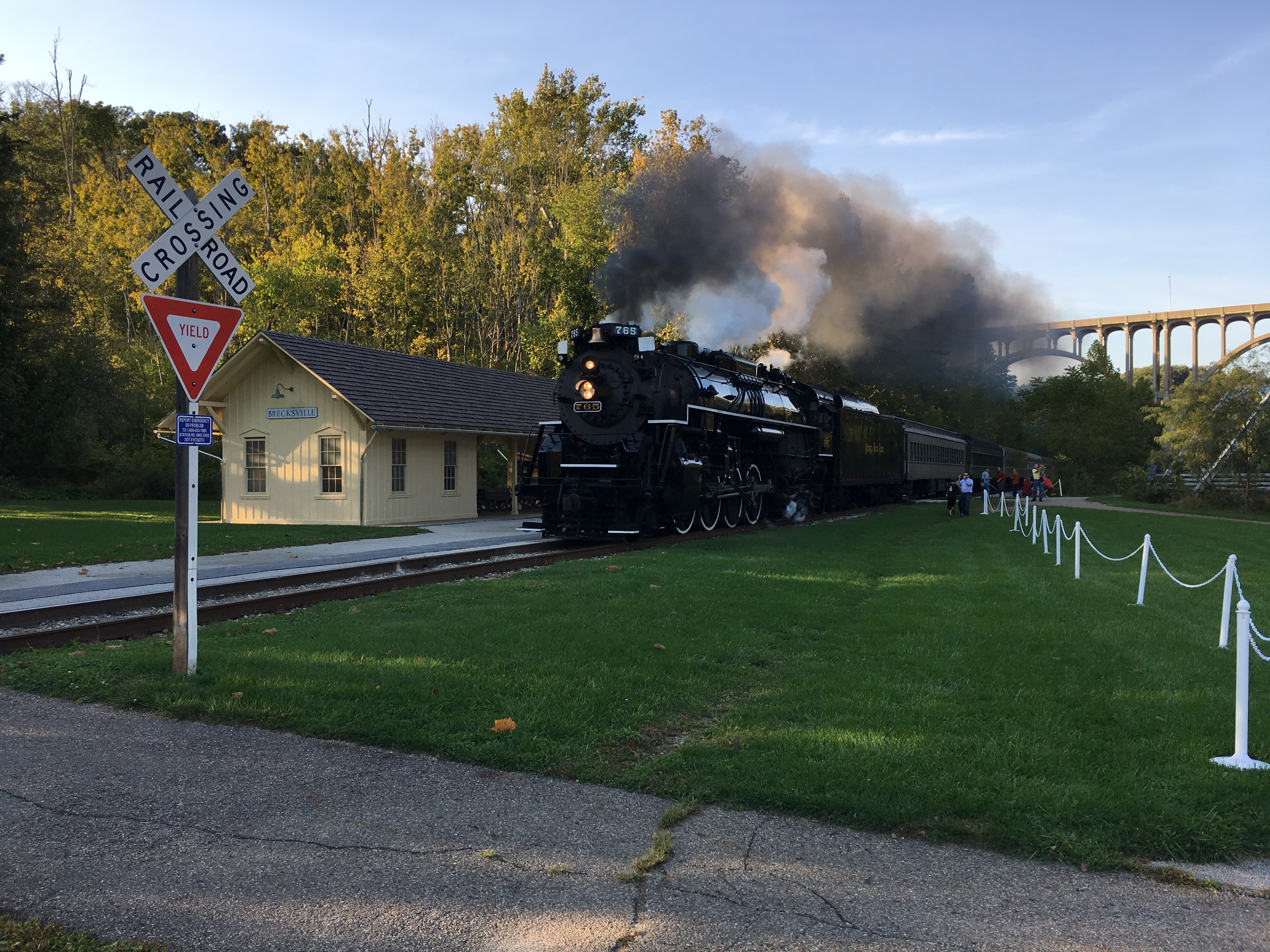
The restored Brecksville station on the Valley Railway. A Cuyahoga Valley excursion, led by Nickel Plate Road 765, passes the old station, on September 28, 2018

=== Depots ===
The Valley Railway originally built 16 depots. North to south, these were located at:

- Cleveland. (Note: The passenger depot was located on the south side of Canal Road just before it met Columbus Road. The company also owned about 1,900 feet (580 m) of docks on the Cuyahoga River just south of the passenger depot. A separate freight station existed on Merwin Avenue between West and James Streets.)
- Independence
- Tinker's Creek
- Brecksville
- Boston Mills
- Peninsula
- Johnny Cake Lock on the Ohio and Erie Canal (later renamed Unionville, and still later Everett) (Note: Unionville was renamed in honor of Sylvester T. Everett, the Valley Railroad's vice president and treasurer.)
- Hawkins (later renamed Ira; now no longer in existence) (Note: Ira was located at the intersection of Ira Road and Riverview Road.)
- Niles (later renamed Botzum)
- Akron at Howard and Ridge Streets
- Krumroy (south of Akron on Krumroy Road, between Marvo Drive and McChesney Road)
- Myersville
- Green

In 1884, Akron granted permission for the Valley to build a spur into the heart of the city. On this spur the railroad built a new, larger passenger depot at the intersection of Canal and West Market Streets in 1887. The railroad continued to use the old station at Howard and Ridge Streets until 1971.

=== Track bed lawsuit ===
A portion of the Valley Railway's route followed the bed of the abandoned Ohio and Erie Canal. The canal bed was originally owned by the state of Ohio. The railroad asked the Cleveland City Council if it would lease the canal bed to the company, and the council agreed to do so on March 24, 1879. On October 31, 1879, pursuant to previously enacted state law, Governor Richard M. Bishop transferred title to that portion of the canal within the city limits to the city of Cleveland. On November 4, 1879, the city formally leased the canal bed to the Valley Railway for 99 years. Although the value of the land was estimated to be $280,000 ($8,000,000 in 2025 dollars), the city agreed to a one-time payment of $265,000 ($7,500,000 in 2025 dollars), payable in Valley Railway corporate bonds. The railway filled the canal with ballast to create the track bed.

The state of Ohio was displeased that the city had leased the canal bed, and challenged the lease in 1879. A special joint committee was appointed by the Ohio Senate that year to examine the issue, but concluded that the city properly held title to the canal bed and could do with it as it wished. The joint committee's report was subsequently adopted by the Ohio Senate. This did not put an end to the dispute. In late 1895, Ohio Attorney General John K. Richards announced that, in his opinion, the lease to the railroad was illegal. The state then sued to recover the canal bed and evict the railroad. The state legislature adopted a resolution later that year in which it expressed its opinion that the transfer of title to the city had been proper under state law.

Discussions among the city, state, and Valley Railway continued until 1908. That year, an appraiser once more found in favor of the railway. Frustrated, the state attorney general filed a motion in state district court in early March 1908 demanding title to the canal bed. In October of that year, the railway filed a demurrer in the case. The case dragged on into 1910. The 1896 legislative resolution became an issue before the courts, with the state attorney general arguing that a resolution was inadequate to affirm the city's title to the canal bed. Only a bill could have confirmed title, the state argued in March 1910. The district court held for the state of Ohio. The railway appealed, and an appellate court held for the state of Ohio. The railway appealed to the Supreme Court of Ohio. In late January 1912, the Supreme Court of Ohio held in favor of the railway.

=== Baltimore and Ohio takeover ===
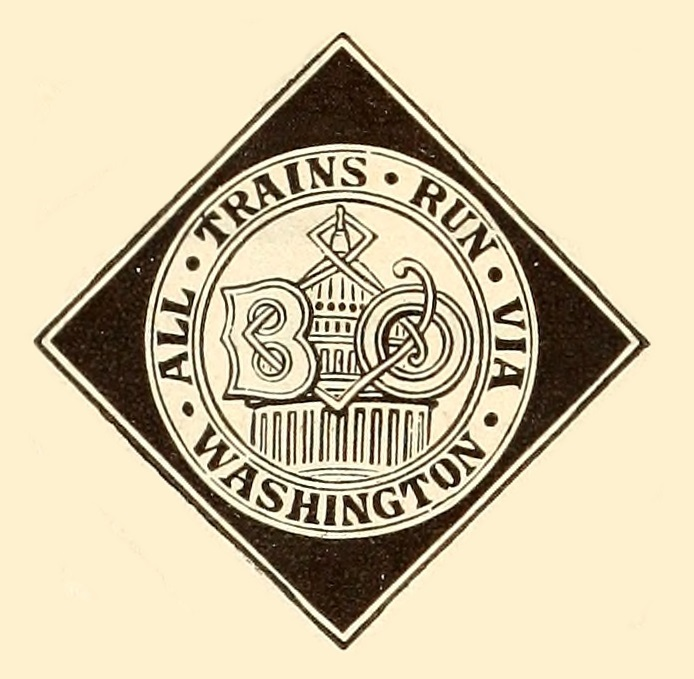
The B&O took majority ownership in the Valley Railway in 1889.

The Valley Railroad found itself in tight competition with the Connotton Valley Railway, which opened in January 1882 (Note: The Connotton Valley Railroad reached Mogadore (a hamlet east of Akron) in 1881, Cleveland in 1882, and Zanesville in 1889. It converted to standard gauge on November 18, 1888, and was renamed the Cleveland, Canton and Southern Railroad on May 17, 1890. It went into receivership on September 15, 1893, and was acquired by the W&LE on August 5, 1899.) and had a similar route into the Tuscarawas County coal fields. Yet, coal was the key to the Valley's financial success: By 1888, 75 percent of the Valley Railway's income came from freight, and 40 percent of its freight tonnage was coal.

The Baltimore & Ohio Railroad (B&O) wanted to gain access to Cleveland, but lacked a route of its own into the city. In the spring of 1889, Taintor & Holt, a New York City investment firm, began buying up the Valley Railroad's stock on behalf of the B&O. The firm turned this stock over to the B&O in the fall of 1889. With the assistance of Valley board member Sylvester T. Everett and Valley president Jeptha Wade, the B&O obtained majority ownership of the Valley Railroad in late 1889. At the board of directors meeting on January 8, 1890, the B&O installed three of its own candidates on the Valley's board of directors. Wade resigned as president, and the new board elected Thomas M. King (a B&O official from Baltimore) president in his place. Sylvester Everett was elected the railroad's new vice president.

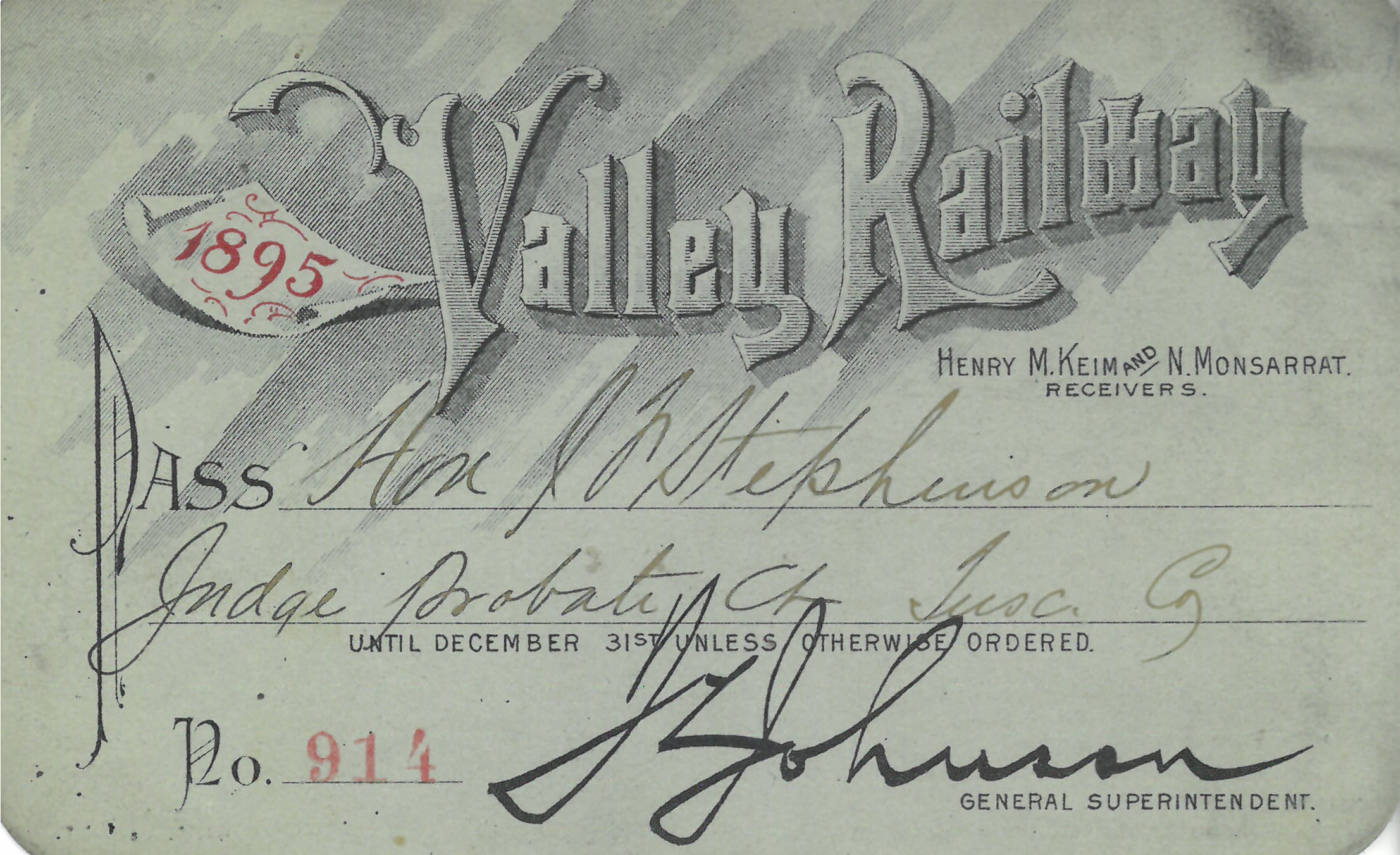

=== 1895 bankruptcy ===
The Valley Railway was financially successful. In its first decade, the railroad's main cargoes were coal, copper ore, iron ore, lime, sand, and stone, but it carried much less agricultural produce than had been estimated. By 1892, four trains a day ran the entire length of the railroad, with two additional trains running each day between Cleveland and Akron.

Worldwide financial difficulties led to the Valley Railway's collapse in 1892. They began with the Baring crisis in the United Kingdom, a banking panic which spread to the United States and caused a major recession in 1891. The Valley Railway went into receivership in 1892. The railroad might have recovered, but the Panic of 1893 led to another significant downturn in both passengers and freight traffic. The railroad tried to build revenue by constructing a 3-mile (4.8 km) branch from the main line at Willow (Old Brecksville Road) along Mill Creek to E. 76th Street, and then E. 76th Street and Jones Road to Broadway Avenue. This track was intended to serve the old Newburgh area's steel industry, and became known as the Newburgh Branch. (Note: It included two southwest spurs at Old Brecksville Road; a spur east through Bacci Park almost to Donovan Drive; and two spurs at about Bletch Ct., one parallel and north to the branch and the other east and then south (along Warner Road).)

Expansion proved unsuccessful. The Valley Railway had been the primary means of travel from Canton to Akron to Cleveland, but in 1895 the Northern Ohio Interurban Railroad opened. This inexpensive light rail service effectively destroyed the Valley Railway's passenger traffic between Cleveland and Akron, eliminating a major source of the company's revenue. The Valley defaulted on its bills and interest payments and went into full bankruptcy on August 2, 1895.

The company was reorganized as the Cleveland Terminal and Valley Railroad (CT&V) on October 3, 1895. As part of the reorganization, the Valley transferred property worth about $250,000 ($9,700,000 in 2025 dollars) to the LS&MS as payment for the 1879 loan.

== Cleveland, Terminal and Valley Railroad ==
=== New Cleveland passenger and freight facilities ===
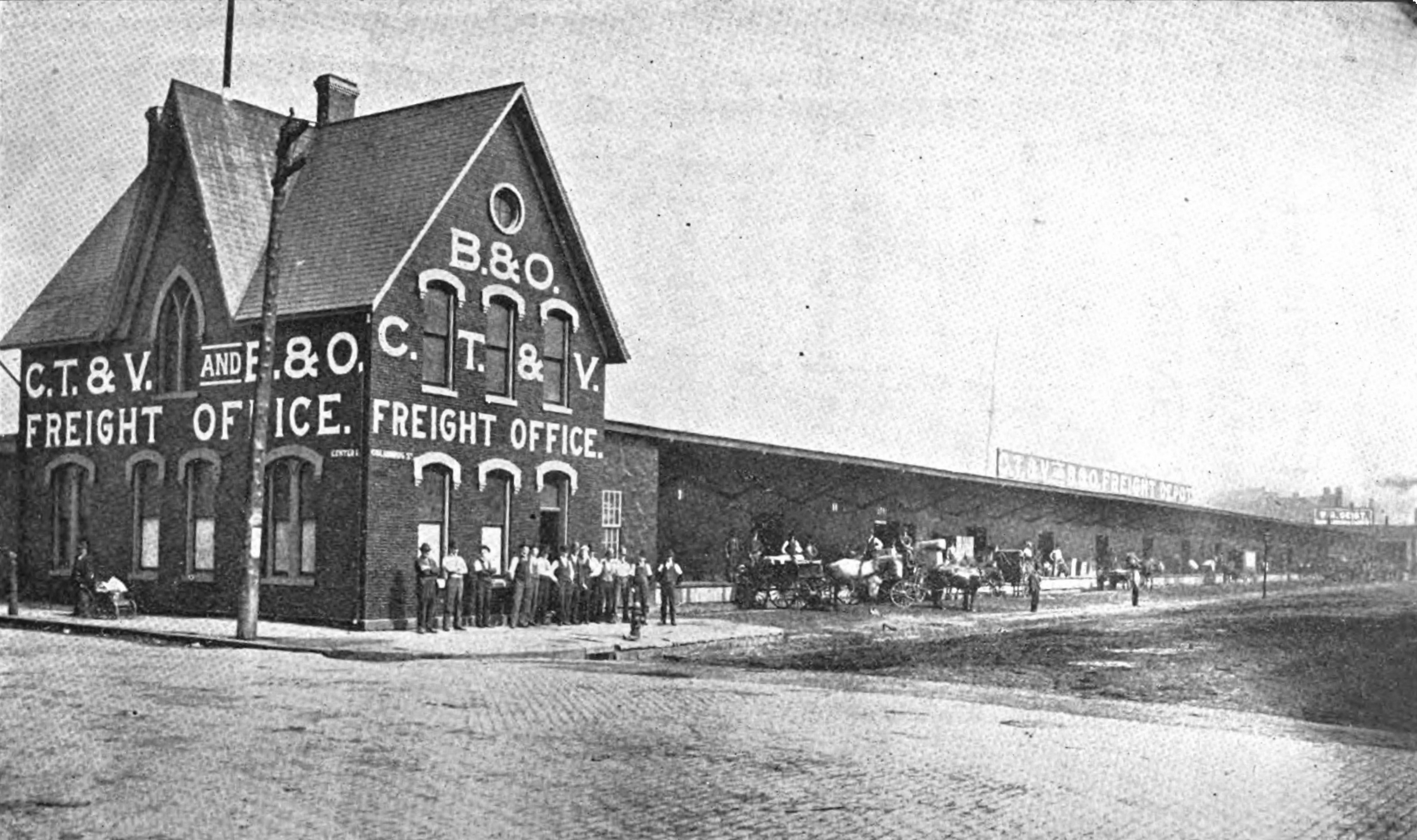
New 1896 freight depot

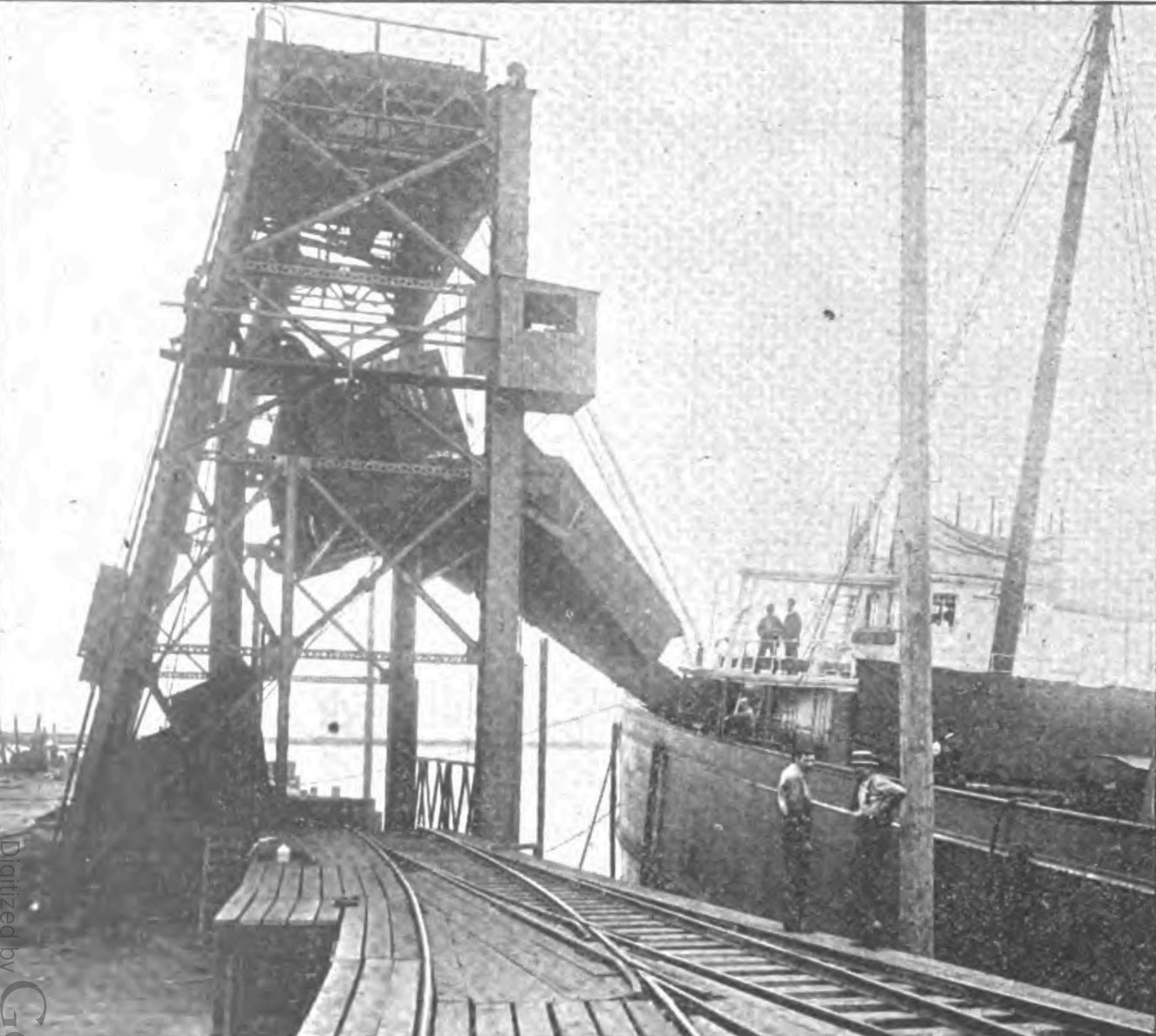
1896 Riverbed St. freight dock, with McMyler rotary coal hoist

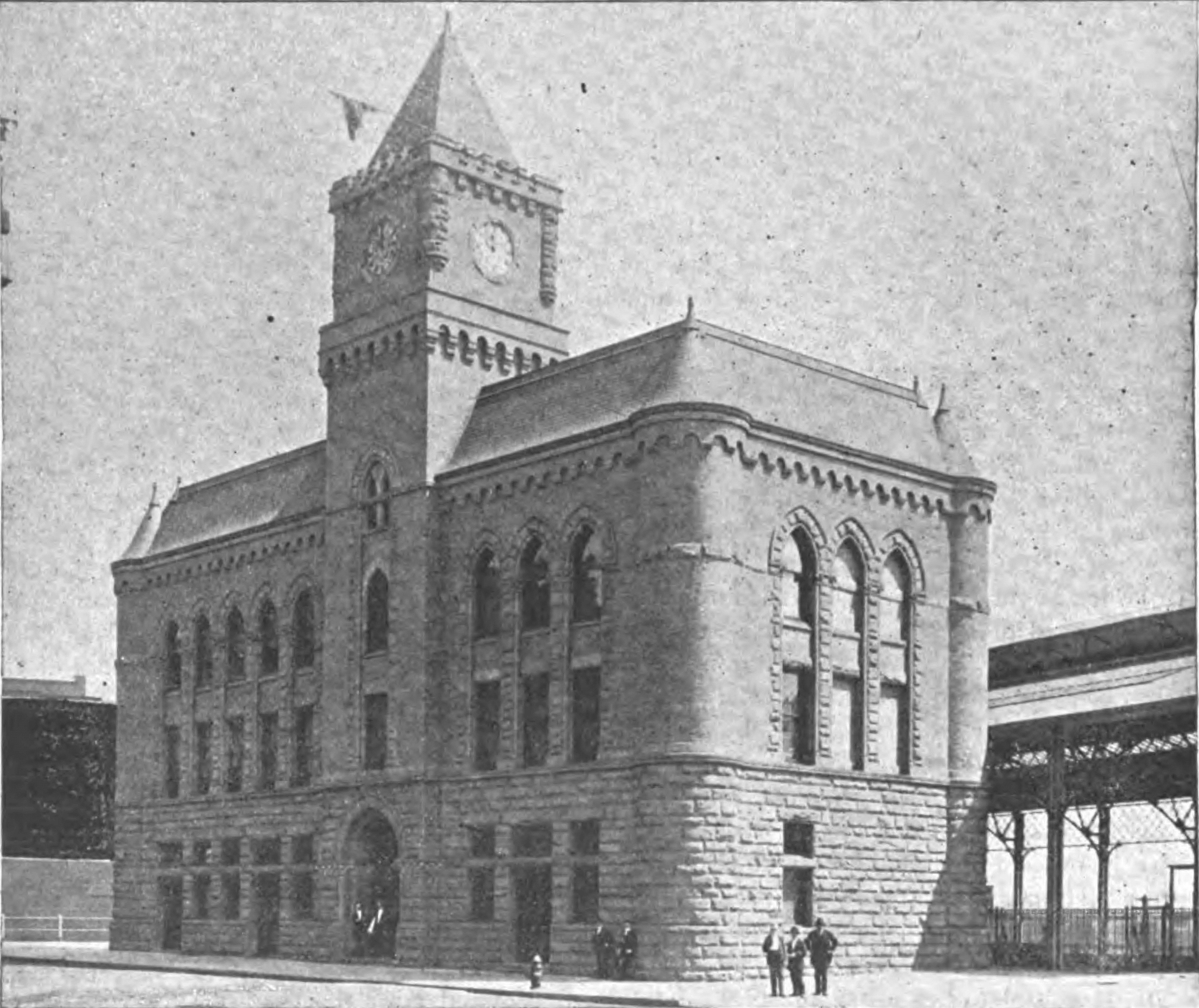
New 1898 passenger depot

In February 1896, the CT&V announced it would construct new, larger freight and passenger facilities in Cleveland to accommodate the increased business it was doing in the city. The existing passenger depot at the foot of Seneca Street (now W. 3rd Street) would be demolished and a 500-foot (150 m) long, 125-foot (38 m) deep, two-story station built on the same spot. A 700-foot (210 m) long train shed, parallel to the rear of the depot, would also be built. A trestle would bring the trains up to the level of the station and train shed. The CT&V also acquired 2,500 feet (760 m) of riverfront along Columbus Road, south of Center Street. The company said it would build a second freight station and extensive new docks there, complete with McMyler rotary car dumpers. To connect the new freight station and docks with the main tracks, the railway asked the city to close Lime Street. The total cost of the project was estimated at $500,000 ($19,400,000 in 2025 dollars). The freight station, which also featured derricks to assist with the loading of heavy cargo, was completed in June 1896 and the old freight depot retained as a storage facility. The steel-frame station was 50 feet (15 m) deep and 500 feet (150 m) long, with walls and roofing of sheet metal. There were 25 loading bays on the dock side alone, and traveling overhead cranes facilitated the movement of heavy loads onto pallets or into freight wagons.

As part of the freight expansion, the CT&V built a second freight depot and docks on the Cuyahoga River between Main Avenue and Cathan Avenue (just west of the Superior Avenue Viaduct Bridge). The city of Cleveland, however, wished to widen the Cuyahoga River by 80 feet (24 m) at this point. The city and the railway came to an agreement whereby the city would close West River Street and give this 80 feet (24 m) of land to the railroad. The 80 feet (24 m) of land on which the CT&V docks sat would be removed to allow for the widened river channel. Since the river was a "highway" under state law, the railway agreed to pay an assessment of about $16,500 ($600,000 in 2025 dollars) for "highway improvements"; in return, the city agreed to rebuild the CT&V's docks.

The new passenger depot began construction in September 1897. Designed by local structural engineer A. Lincoln Hyde and architect William Stillman Dutton in a modified Gothic Revival style, it was built by contractor C.N. Griffin. The structure was much different than originally projected, just 100-foot (30 m) long and 43-foot (13 m) deep but with three stories rather than two. The roof was of slate, mined in Virginia. The building's steel frame had a first floor facade of rock-faced blue sandstone, while the upper floors were of buff pressed brick trimmed with stone. Turrets at the corners helped to strengthen the building, and clock tower illuminated by floodlights rose from the steeply pitched roof. The clock mechanism was designed and built by the local firm of Scribner and Loehr. The baggage room on the lower level had an asphalt floor. At the main entrance on the first floor was a vestibule from which passengers could pass into the lobby. Men's and women's waiting rooms were located on either side of the lobby. First story flooring consisted of mosaic tile manufactured and installed by the Newcastle Block Pavement Co. of Pittsburgh. The walls were painted a reddish-orange and featured wood wainscoting painted dark green, with oak trim and moldings on the walls and ceiling. An elevator and stairs led from the vestibule to the upper floors. The second floor housed the CT&V's corporate headquarters, and featured mosaic tile flooring and walls painted ecru with oak trim. A large brick pillar, running through the building to the foundation, supported the heavy safes in the auditor's and engineer's offices. The third floor contained the railway's engineering and telegraphy offices, while the attic was used for records storage. The entire interior was electrically lit. The train shed was just 300-foot (91 m) and 90-foot (27 m) wide. The cost of the new passenger station was estimated at $100,000 ($3,900,000 in 2025 dollars). The train shed behind the new station was only the second of its kind erected in the United States. Constructed by the Massillon Bridge Company, it consisted of two levels—one for the receiving of incoming and outgoing passenger traffic, and the other for the making up of trains and the loading of special trains.

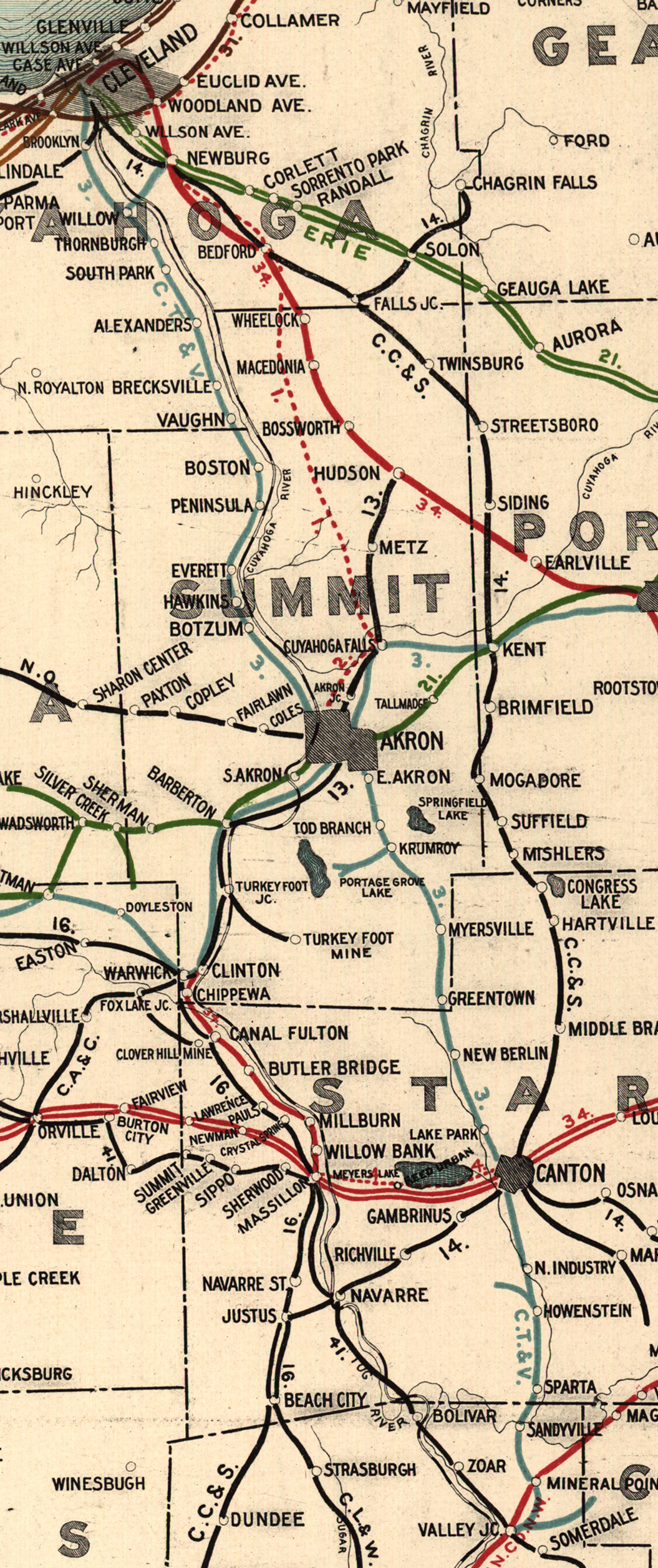
System map from 1898

=== Route changes, trackage right leases, and new spurs ===
With the depression caused by the Panic of 1896 ending, the CT&V did very well financially. It gave the Wheeling & Lake Erie trackage rights over the entire length of the CT&V, built a new freight depot in Cleveland on Seneca Street near the Central Viaduct (a block north of what is now W. 3rd Street and Harrison Street), and purchased 3.4 acres (14,000 m^{2}) between end of its tracks and Lake Erie for use as a rail yard. This land was obtained from the city of Cleveland for $6,000 ($200,000 in 2025 dollars). The CT&V subsequently built up the land so it would no longer flood.

On November 9, 1898, the Sandyville and Waynesburg Railroad was chartered to build a line between the C&TV line at Sandyville northeast about 3 miles (4.8 km) to Waynesburg, Ohio. The line was completed on July 1, 1899, and leased to the CT&V. (The line was originally intended to be 9.5 miles (15.3 km) long.)

In April 1899, the Davis Railway Co. constructed a 3.5-mile (5.6 km) extension of the spur at Mineral City. This branch pushed east along Huff Run to Linden (an unincorporated crossroads hamlet) and the Davis Mine No. 2 coal mine. The entire 4.9-mile (7.9 km) length of the spur from Valley Junction to the mine became known as the Huff Run Branch. Mining was so important in the area that the Huff Run Branch later added 2.63 miles (4.23 km) of second track and 7.53 miles (12.12 km) of sidings.

The B&O was threatened with losing access to many of the southern Ohio markets it relied on in 1899. The first threat came from the Cleveland and Marietta Railway. In 1872, it built a branch line from Marietta, Ohio, to the B&O main line at Harmer Junction. This allowed B&O and CT&V freight to be shipped on the Cleveland and Marietta (C&M) directly to Cleveland (or to be transferred at Canton and shipped to Cleveland). The Cleveland and Marietta said it would no longer accept freight for either railroad beginning January 1, 1900. That same year, the Wheeling & Lake Erie acquired the Cleveland, Canton and Southern Railroad, whose track from Cleveland to Canton and then to Coshocton and Zanesville. The W&LE said it would cancel the CT&V's trackage rights, which threatened to cut the CT&V completely off from all southern routes and markets. In response, the CT&V began to swiftly survey a route from Valley Junction to Canal Dover (now Dover) and then to Newark, Ohio, which would give it a link to the B&O's main line and threaten to eat significantly into traffic on both the C&M and the W&LE. To avoid construction of an independently owned new main line, the Pennsylvania Railroad agreed to give the B&O subsidiary trackage rights between Valley Junction and Canal Dover. At Canal Dover, the CT&V connected with the Lake Shore and Tuscarawas Valley Railroad (now operating as the Cleveland, Lorain and Wheeling Railroad).

The CT&V thrived financially, and so did business along its route—and the railway expanded to meet this demand. In 1900, the Cleveland-Boston Bag Co. built a large mill near the tiny hamlet of Boston Mills to take advantage of the railroad. Boston Mills soon grew into a town. In 1904, the railroad built a 4-mile (6.4 km) spur from Willow (the modern intersection of Fuhrmeyer Road and Old Brecksville Road) along Mill Creek to connect with the Cleveland Short Line Railway near what is now E. 73rd Street and Deveny Avenue in Cleveland. That same year, the railway spent $115,000 ($4,100,000 in 2025 dollars) strengthening all the bridges along its route, and even rebuilding some older ones, so that it could haul heavier loads and use new, heavier, more powerful locomotives. In 1905, the Jaite Paper Mill opened 2 miles (3.2 km) north of Boston Mills to take advantage of open land near the railroad as well.

=== New B&O rail yard ===
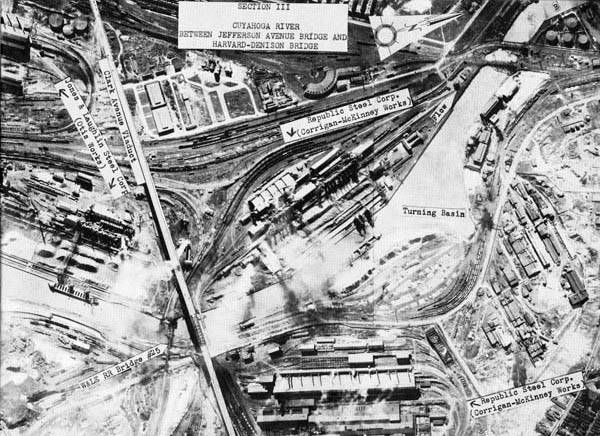
B&O rail yard in 1946 (top center) with roundhouse visible

In 1906, the B&O closed the existing CT&V roundhouse and built a $400,000 ($14,300,000 in 2025 dollars), much larger roundhouse and rail yard on W. 3rd Street in Cleveland. The 10-stall semicircular roundhouse measured 280 feet (85 m) on the outside and 145 feet (44 m) on the inside and cost $45,347 ($1,600,000 in 2025 dollars). Another $200,000 ($7,200,000 in 2025 dollars) was spent building the rail yard.

Other improvements included:

- A $12,500 ($400,000 in 2025 dollars), 150-by-50-foot (46 by 15 m), 14-foot (4.3 m) deep cinder pit located about 85 feet (26 m) south of the new roundhouse;
- A $26,370 ($900,000 in 2025 dollars), 725-by-30-foot (221.0 by 9.1 m) sand house and coal tipple located south of the new cinder pit;
- A two-story brick resthouse for trainmen northwest of the roundhouse, with second-floor reading and sleeping rooms;
- A one-story machine, blacksmith, and engine and boiler repair shop made of brick attached to the north end of the roundhouse;
- An $11,000 ($400,000 in 2025 dollars), 120-by-30-foot (36.6 by 9.1 m) storehouse and oilhouse north of the roundhouse; and
- $145,000 ($5,200,000 in 2025 dollars) in infrastructure improvements, which included a steam heating plant, smokestack, fresh water system, drain and sewer system, blow-off lines, and two 50,000-US-gallon (190,000 L) water tanks.

=== Bridge replacements in Cleveland ===
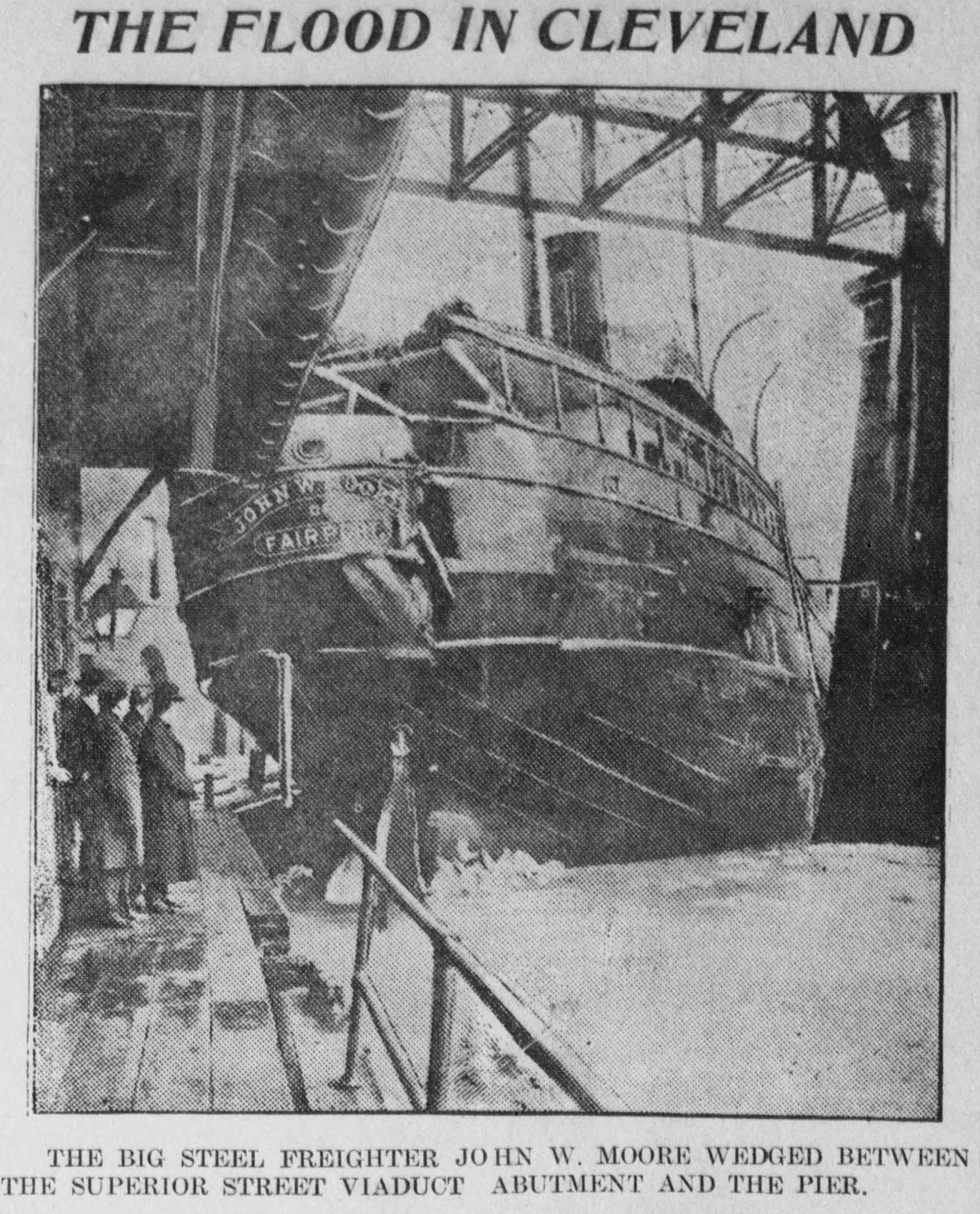
A freighter wedged against the CTV's Center Street swing bridge in 1904. The company's lawsuit over damage to the bridge went to the U.S. Supreme Court.

A controversy broke out in 1905 over whether the CT&V would be required to replace its railroad bridge over the Cuyahoga River. At issue was a swing bridge over the Old Ship Channel of the Cuyahoga River. (Note: When white settlers arrived in Ohio in 1796, the Cuyahoga River followed the Old Ship Channel, also known as the Old River Bed, before turning sharply to enter Lake Erie about 1 mile (1.6 km) west of its current mouth. The twisting mouth of the river inhibited ship traffic upstream, however, and in 1825 the current, straight mouth of the river was dug. This new mouth of the Cuyahoga was widened in 1854. Over time, sand bars built up which sealed off the old mouth of the river from the lake.) The Constitution of the United States and various federal court rulings gave the federal government control over all navigable waters, and the United States Army Corps of Engineers (tasked under federal law with improving navigable waters) asserted the right to regulate the bridge. The Corps wanted the bridge removed or replaced, since the center pier of the bridge hindered traffic in the Old Ship Channel and the embankment spans, when open, used up space which the Corps wished to use for new docks. The CT&V, however, argued that the 1825 changes to the river rendered the Old Ship Channel and the New Ship Channel man-made waterways and hence not subject to federal jurisdiction. Local hearings were held which documented the hindrance to water traffic, and the railroad agreed in April 1905 to remove the swing bridge no later than April 1, 1907. Secretary of War William Howard Taft then intervened, ordering the bridge gone by April 1, 1906. Although the railroad objected to the tight timeframe, it went ahead with plans for the new bridge as ordered. The railroad proposed a replacing the existing structure with a Scherzer rolling lift bridge, a plan which was approved in August 1905. The new bridge opened in September 1906. Designed by the Scherzer Rolling Lift Bridge Co., manufactured by the King Bridge Co., and erected by the Pittsburgh Construction Co., the double-track, 230-foot (70 m) bridge cost $180,000 ($6,400,000 in 2025 dollars).

The B&O, of its own accord, then rebuilt two more bridges in Cleveland. The first was over the Cuyahoga River near what is now Quigley Road and W. 3rd Street. The 230-foot (70 m) rolling lift bridge was built by the King Bridge Co. and completed in July. Planning for replacement of a second bridge, this one spanning the Cuyahoga at what is now Carter Road (on the west bank) and W. 3rd Street (on the east bank), began in June 1908. Originally, this rolling lift bridge was to be 160 feet (49 m) long and cost $200,000 ($7,200,000 in 2025 dollars). Construction of the bridge was delayed, however, when the city of Cleveland began planning for a new viaduct over the Cuyahoga River valley near the same location. By November 1908, the city had decided to widen the river at this location, and asked the railroad to construct a longer bridge. Discussions between the city and railroad ensued, and it was not until August 1909 that both sides agreed to a $275,000 ($9,900,000 in 2025 dollars), 200-foot (61 m) long rolling lift bridge. Built by the Pennsylvania Steel Co., construction took nearly 18 months. Taking into account its piers, abutments, and approaches, it was the largest rolling lift bridge in the world.

The company also repaired a swing bridge just downstream from what is now the Center Street Bridge. This swing bridge was severely damaged when floods sent three ships crashing against the bridge. The CT&V sued for damages, and the case went to the United States Supreme Court. The Supreme Court held in Cleveland Terminal and Valley R. Co. v. Cleveland S. S. Co., 208 U.S. 316 (1908), that bridge piers, bridge protective pilings, and docks were not "aids to navigation" and thus damage to them by a ship (even if on navigable waters) was not a cause for action under United States maritime law.

== B&O takeover ==
In June 1909, the B&O assumed active management of the CT&V. This ended a process initiated in 1901, when the parent company began unifying operations with the subsidiary (beginning with a single ticket structure). During this period of active management, the B&O built a CT&V rail yard at Canal Dover in 1911.

The B&O fully absorbed the CT&V in 1915.

=== CT&V operations under the B&O ===
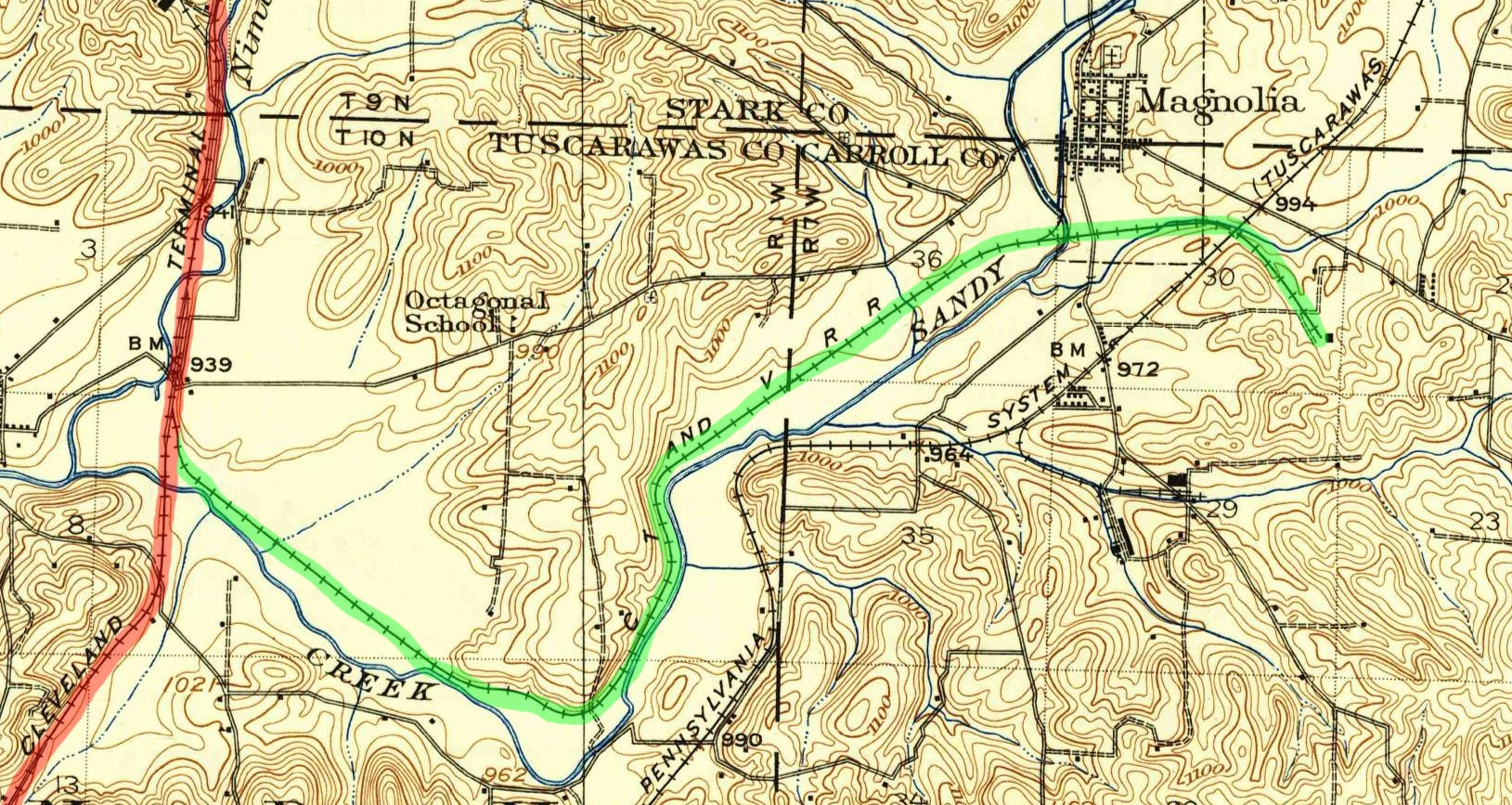
The CT&V's Magnolia Branch (in green), abandoned in 1924

In the early 20th century, the B&O offered three round-trip passenger trains a day between Cleveland and Canton on the CT&V tracks. One of these continued to Marietta. The high frequency of passenger trains was needed because the B&O's Chicago-to-Jersey City service ran through both Akron and Wheeling. The connection between Cleveland and Akron took on additional importance when, in January 1918, the B&O ceased to run passenger trains through Wheeling, and all of its passenger service went through Akron. The B&O attempted to make the line a better freight route, and in 1929, part of the line was relocated due to the construction of Akron Fulton Airport. However, the rapid availability of the automobile led to severe losses in passenger revenues, and the increasing use of trucks to move bulk goods significantly reduced freight traffic. Passenger service to Marietta ended on July 18, 1933.

Slowly, the B&O began reducing the reach of the old Valley Railway. The B&O abandoned the Magnolia Branch in January 1924. It abandoned its track between Valley Junction and Mineral City in 1936, due to construction of the Dover Dam flood control project and realigned another 2.5 miles (4.0 km) of track to avoid the new reservoir. (Note: The work extended from two miles north of East Sparta, Ohio, to a mile south of Sandyville, Ohio.) The new route involved building a four-span bridge over Sandy Creek. At Mineral City, the CT&V was forced to build two wooden trestles to accommodate flood control projects. One of these was 860 feet (260 m) long and crossed a tributary of Huff Run as well as two roads. The railroad abandoned and removed the Huff Run Branch from Valley Junction to Mineral City in 1938 following eight years of disuse.

In June 1934, the CT&V moved its passenger station to Cleveland's new Terminal Tower. The 1897 passenger station on Canal Road was converted into a freight depot.

Passenger travel on the former CT&V increased somewhat during World War II, but declined sharply again afterward. During the 1940s, the unprofitable passenger service to Valley Junction ended. The B&O ceased all passenger service on the line on December 7, 1962. The last passenger train to run on the old CT&V route was the Cleveland Night Express, which provided overnight service to Baltimore. It abandoned the Newburgh Branch in 1964.

== Post-B&O history of the line ==
The Chesapeake and Ohio Railway (C&O) took control of the B&O on February 4, 1963. The two railroads retained their separate identities until merging into the Chessie System on June 15, 1973. By this time, freight service on the Valley Division had been reduced to limited mixed freight trains and once-a-day ore trains between Cleveland and the New Castle steel mills.

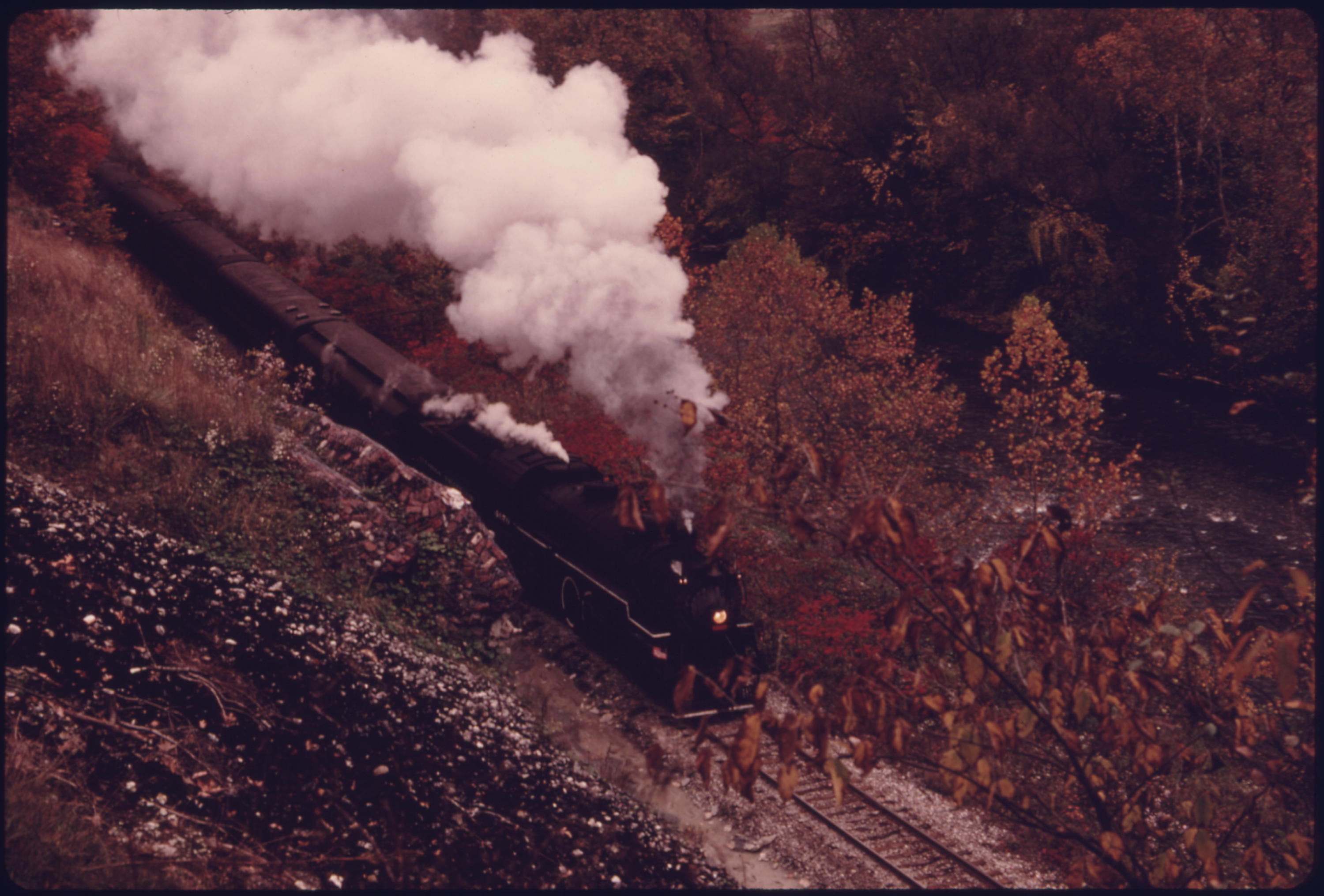
A Cuyahoga Valley Excursion led by Grand Trunk Western 4070 traveling along the Cuyahoga River near Akron, in October 1975

By 1967, interest was sparked in local communities for passenger train operations to be resurrected on the Valley Division. Henry Lucas (a lawyer and a director of the Cuyahoga County Fair), Siegfried Buerling (director of the Hale Farm historic site), members of the Midwest Railway Historical Foundation (MRHF), and the Western Reserve Historical Society proposed a tourist railroad operation to be allowed on the right-of-way, but the B&O initially refused. (Note: At the time, the Midwest Railway Historical Foundation was looking for a place to run their steam locomotive, Grand Trunk Western 4070.) Backers for a scenic railroad continued to press ahead, and in 1975, Chessie System chairman Cyrus S. Eaton generously gave his approval. The Cuyahoga Valley Preservation and Scenic Railway Association—now known as the Cuyahoga Valley Scenic Railroad (CVSR)—began operating the Cuyahoga Valley Line between Cleveland and Akron, on June 28, 1975.

=== CSX sales of the line ===
The Chessie System merged with the Seaboard Coast Line Railroad in November 1980 to form CSX. In 1984, CSX abandoned the remainder of the Huff Run Branch as well as all of its line between Sandyville and Mineral City. On September 5 of that year, CSX announced it would abandon the Valley Railway track between Akron and Independence. The National Park Service (NPS) subsequently began negotiating to buy the 26 miles (42 km) of trackage to add to the Cuyahoga Valley National Recreation Area (which had been established on December 29, 1974, and became a national park on October 11, 2000).

The sale was finalized on September 28, 1987, with the NPS paying $2.5 million for the right-of-way. The northern terminus of the NPS's track is at Independence (Granger Road and Interstate 77, approximately 1.5 miles (2.4 km) north of the Rockside station), after which CSX resumes ownership of the track. The southern terminus of the Park Service's track is at the Akron station, at which point CSX ownership of the track resumed. CSX subsequently sold two more portions of the old Valley Railway. In October 1992, CSX sold 12.26 miles (19.73 km) of track between Canton and Sandyville to a new Wheeling & Lake Erie Railroad (which had recently been spun off by the Norfolk Southern Railway).

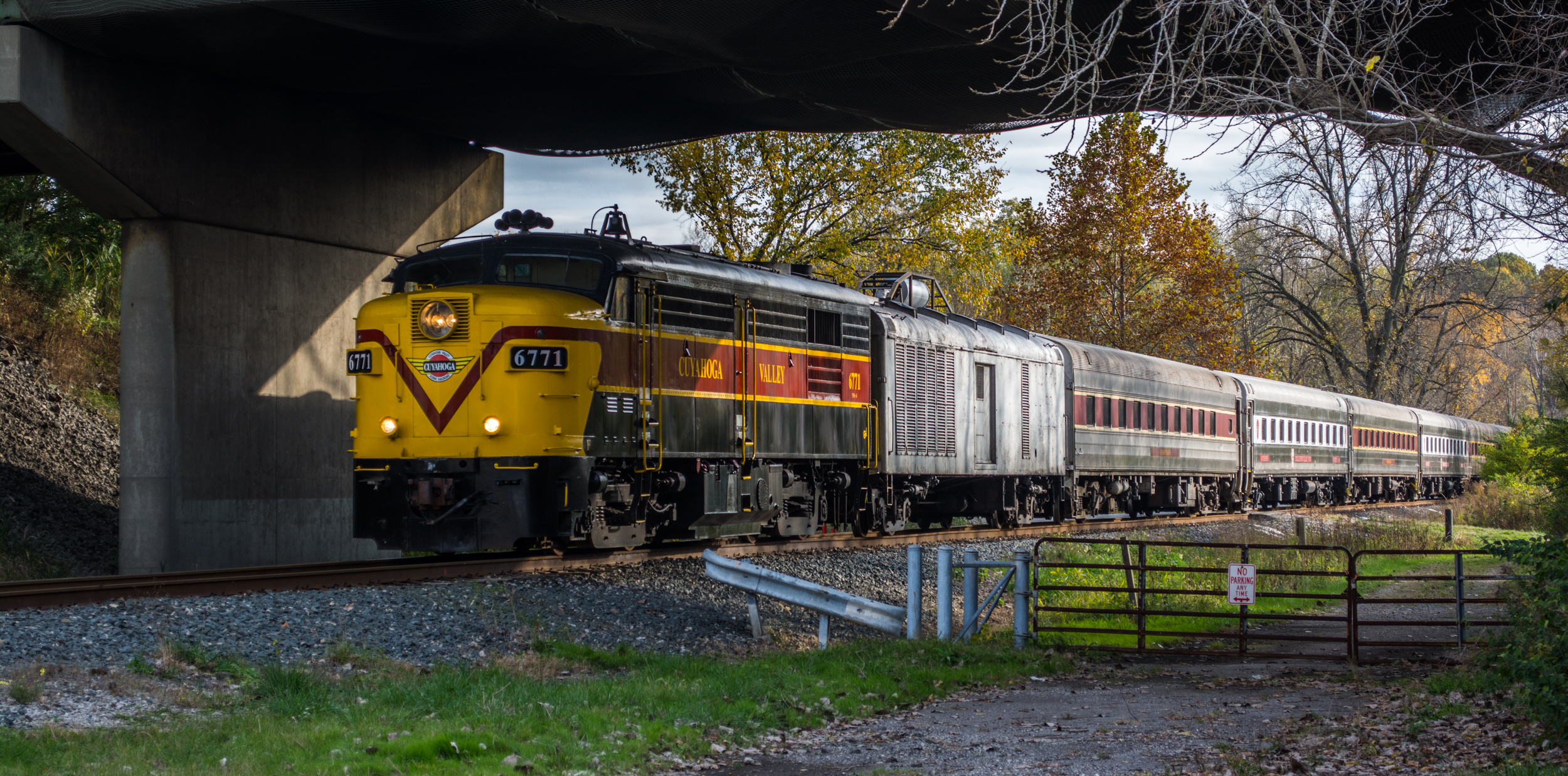
A Cuyahoga Valley Scenic Railroad train, led by FPA-4 diesel locomotive No. 6771, idles at Rockside Road in Independence, Ohio, on November 4, 2017

In May 2000, Akron's METRO Regional Transit Authority purchased 24 miles (39 km) of track between Akron and Canton from CSX in May 2000. (Note: This track begins at Howard Street in Akron, at the southern terminus of the National Park Service track. It travels 1.6 miles (2.6 km) east, 4.76 miles (7.66 km) south, and then 3.1 miles (5.0 km) southeast to the city of Green, Ohio. It continues another 11.7 miles (18.8 km) southeast before entering Canton. The line travels about 3.9 miles (6.3 km) through Canton before terminating at the Canton Crossing Diamond, where it connects to the W&LE and the Norfolk Southern.) Metro provides trackage rights to the Cuyahoga Valley Scenic Railroad and two freight railroads, the W&LE and the Akron Barberton Cluster Railway. (Note: W&LE's trackage rights stem from a 1992 lease of 10.25 miles (16.50 km) of this track between Canton and Aultman.) CSX still owns and uses for freight the remainder of the Valley Railway (which it calls the Cleveland Terminal and Valley Subdivision) between Independence and Cleveland. It is unclear when the 0.6 miles (0.97 km) of track between the end of the line (on Whiskey Island) and Literary Road (near W. 3rd Street), or the 26 miles (42 km) of track between Valley Junction and Bowerston, was abandoned.

The portion between Literary Road and Quigley Road (near Interstate 490), about 0.4 miles (0.64 km), was abandoned in 1983. Freight train use of the remaining portion of CT&V Subdivision is light, and as of 1992 the track was not in good enough condition to accommodate passenger trains.

== The Valley Railway line, as completed ==
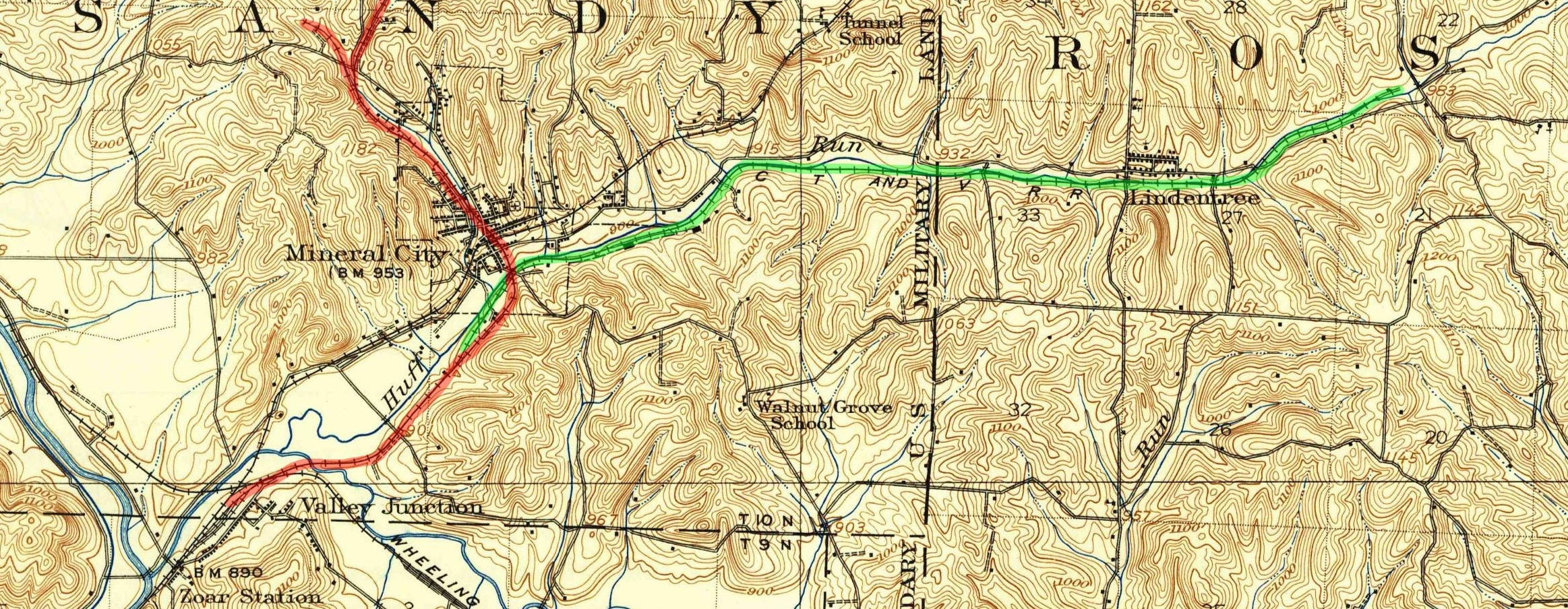
The Valley Railway's Huff Run Branch (in green) in 1912

As of 1906, the Valley Railway had 75.47 miles (121.46 km) of main track and 4.48 miles (7.21 km) of secondary track; 79.64 miles (128.17 km) of main and secondary track siding and yards; 11.3 miles (18.2 km) of branch and spur track; and 8.95 miles (14.40 km) of branch and spur track siding and yards. About 7 miles (11 km) of track were in the Cleveland city limits.

The railroad had three branch lines: the Huff Run Branch (about 1.5 miles (2.4 km) from Mineral City east to Lindentree), the Magnolia Branch (about 2.88 miles (4.63 km) from Sandyville along Sandy Creek to Magnolia), (Note: Although the CT&V leased a line from Magnolia to Waynesburg, it did not own this track and thus is not included in the description of the Magnolia Line in this article.) and the Newburg Branch (about 3 miles (4.8 km) from Granger Road, following Mill Creek, to Broadway Avenue).

The railroad had a number of spurs, which served: the Independence stone quarry, (Note: Located at what is now 8900 Hemlock Road in Independence, Ohio.) the Schumacher "State Quarry" at Deep Lock, (Note: Located at what is now Deep Lock Quarry Metro Park at 5779 Riverview Road in Summit County.) the Lawson Waterman quarry at Peninsula, (Note: Located at 1980 West Streetsboro Road in Peninsula, Ohio.) the Lawson Waterman quarry at Deep Lock, (Note: Also part of Deep Lock Quarry Metro Park.) the Jaite Paper Mill at Boston Mills, downtown Akron, and the Newburgh Line (through and north of what is now Bacci Park).

The railroad also owned at least three rail yards. The first was the Cleveland terminal yard, built at the end of the line opposite Whiskey Island in downtown Cleveland. It was replaced in 1906 by the B&O Clark Avenue yard on W. 3rd Street. The third rail yard was located in Dover, Ohio. It is unclear when this yard was abandoned.

== Historic sites and districts ==
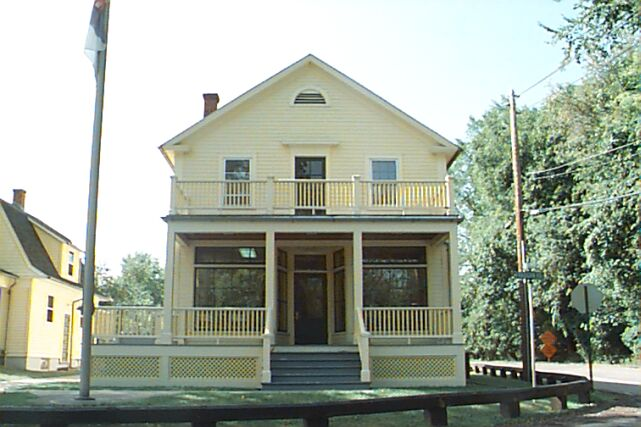
The Jaite Company Store at the Jaite Mill Historic District

The Valley Railway Historic District encompasses the former Valley Railway from Independence to downtown Akron. It was added to the National Register of Historic Places (NRHP) in 1985. Much of the railroad runs parallel or adjacent to the Ohio and Erie Canal (added to the NRHP in 1966). The railroad tracks also pass through the Everett Historic District (added to the NRHP in 1993) and the Peninsula Village Historic District (added to the NRHP in 1974) and adjacent to the Boston Mills Historic District (added to the NRHP in 1992) and the Cascade Locks Historic District (added to the NRHP in 1992).

A Valley Railway spur ran to the Jaite Mill Historic District (added to the NRHP in 1979), and the railway also passed close to Hale Farm and Village (added to the NRHP in 1973).

== See also ==
- Cleveland railroad history

== Bibliography ==
- Baltimore and Ohio Railroad Company (1902). Seventy-Sixth Annual Report of the President and Directors to the Stockholders of the Baltimore and Ohio Railroad Company, for the Year Ended June 30, 1902 (Report). Baltimore, Md.: Press of The John D. Lucas Printing Company.
- Bergmann Associates (February 2012). Metro Rail Freight System Study (PDF) (Report). Akron, Ohio: Metro Regional Transit Authority.
- Bluestone, Daniel M., ed. (1978). Cleveland: An Inventory of Historic Engineering and Industrial Sites. Washington, D.C.: Historic American Engineering Record, U.S. Department of the Interior. hdl:2027/uiug.30112024125988.
- Bruce, Alfred W. (1952). The Steam Locomotive in America. New York: Bonanza Books.
- Fess, Simeon D. (1937). Ohio Historical Gazetteer. Chicago: Lewis Publishing Co.
- Kennedy, J.H. (November 1885). "Early Railroad Interests of Cleveland". The National Magazine. pp. 26–42.
- Lane, Samuel A. (1892). Fifty Years and Over of Akron and Summit County. Akron, Ohio: Beacon Job Dept.
- Linsley, Ray K.; Franzini, Joseph B. (1974). "Water Law". In Black, Peter E. (ed.). Readings in Soil and Water Conservation. New York: MSS Information Corp. ISBN 9780842252041.
- Mansfield, John Brandt (1899). History of the Great Lakes. Volume I. Chicago: J.H. Beers & Co.
- Metzger, Lynn; Bobel, Peg (2009). Canal Fever: The Ohio & Erie Canal, From Waterway to Canalway. Kent, Ohio: Kent State University Press. ISBN 9781606350133.
- Miller, Fred (2000). Tuscarawas County, Ohio. Charleston, S.C.: Arcadia Publishing. ISBN 9780738507408.
- "A Model Passenger Station". The Railway Agent and Station Agent. Vol. 20, no. 1. September 1898. pp. 82–85.
- Ohio Commissioner of Railroads and Telegraphs (1868). Annual Report of the Commissioner of Railroads and Telegraphs, to the Governor of the State of Ohio, for the Year 1867. Columbus, Ohio: L.D. Myers & Bro., State Printers.
- Ohio Commissioner of Railroads and Telegraphs (1868). Annual Report of the Commissioner of Railroads and Telegraphs of the State of Ohio, With Tabulations and Deductions From Reports of the Railroad Corporations of the State, for the Year Ending June 30, 1868. Columbus, Ohio: Columbus Printing Company, State Printers. hdl:2027/uc1.b2896930.
- Ohio Commissioner of Railroads and Telegraphs (1870). Annual Report of the Commissioner of Railroads and Telegraphs of the State of Ohio, With Tabulations and Deductions From Reports of the Railroad Corporations of the State, for the Year Ending June 30, 1869. Columbus, Ohio: Columbus Printing Company, State Printers.
- Ohio Commissioner of Railroads and Telegraphs (1871). Annual Report of the Commissioner of Railroads and Telegraphs, for the Year Ending June 30, 1870, In Two Volumes. Volume II. Columbus, Ohio: Nevins and Myers, State Printers.
- Ohio Commissioner of Railroads and Telegraphs (1872). Fifth Annual Report of the Commissioner of Railroads and Telegraphs of the State of Ohio, for the Governor, for the Year Ending June 30, 1871. Columbus, Ohio: Nevins and Myers, State Printers.
- Ohio Commissioner of Railroads and Telegraphs (1883). Annual Report of the Commissioner of Railroads and Telegraphs of Ohio for the Year Ending June 30, 1882. Columbus, Ohio: Myers Brothers, State Printers. hdl:2027/uc1.b2896936.
- Ohio Commissioner of Railroads and Telegraphs (1906). Thirty-Eighth Annual Report of the Commissioner of Railroads and Telegraphs to the Governor of the State of Ohio for the Year 1905. Springfield, Ohio: Springfield Publishing Company.
- Ohio Co-operative Topographic Survey (1911). Progress Report of the Ohio Co-operative Topographic Survey to January 1, 1910. Springfield, Ohio: The Springfield Publishing Company.
- Ori, David P. (2006). Chessie System. St. Paul, Minn.: Voyageur. ISBN 9780760323397.
- Parsons Brinckerhoff (April 2002). Canton-Akron-Cleveland Inter-Regional Travel Corridor Major Investment Study. Final Report (PDF) (Report). Akron, Ohio. Archived from the original (PDF) on August 4, 2016.
- Price, Mark J. (2015). Lost Akron. Charleston, S.C.: The History Press. ISBN 9781626195769.
- Reese, John S. (2002). Guide Book for the Tourist and Traveler Over the Valley Railway: The Short Line Between Cleveland, Akron, and Canton. Kent, Ohio: Kent State University Press. ISBN 9780873387354.
- Sanders, Craig (2007). Akron Railroads. Charleston, S.C.: Arcadia Publishing. ISBN 9780738541419.
- Sanders, Craig (2014). Cleveland Mainline Railroads. Charleston, S.C.: Arcadia Publishing. ISBN 9781467111379.
- Sanders, Craig (2009). Canton Area Railroads. Charleston, S.C.: Arcadia Publishing. ISBN 9780738561110.
- Secretary of War (1904). "Appendix AAA: Technical Details of Engineering Methods on Fortifications, Rivers and Harbors, and Other Works". Annual Reports for the War Department for the Year Ended June 30, 1904. Volume VIII: Report of the Chief of Engineers. Part 4 (Report). Washington, D.C.: Government Printing Office.
- Surface Transportation Board (1998). Final Environmental Impact Statement. Finance Docket No. 33388. Proposed Conrail Acquisition. Volume 3. Chapter 5 (Report). Washington, D.C.: U.S. Government Printing Office. hdl:2027/ien.35556030194138.
- Tamburro, Sam; Galonska, Juliet (2002). "Introduction". Guide Book for the Tourist and Traveler Over the Valley Railway: The Short Line Between Cleveland, Akron, and Canton. Kent, Ohio: Kent State University Press. ISBN 9780873387354.
- Volpe National Transportation Systems Center (July 2013). Cuyahoga Valley National Park Comprehensive Rail Study. PMIS No. 160989 (PDF) (Report). National Park Service, U.S. Department of the Interior.
