= National Register of Historic Places listings in Ohio =

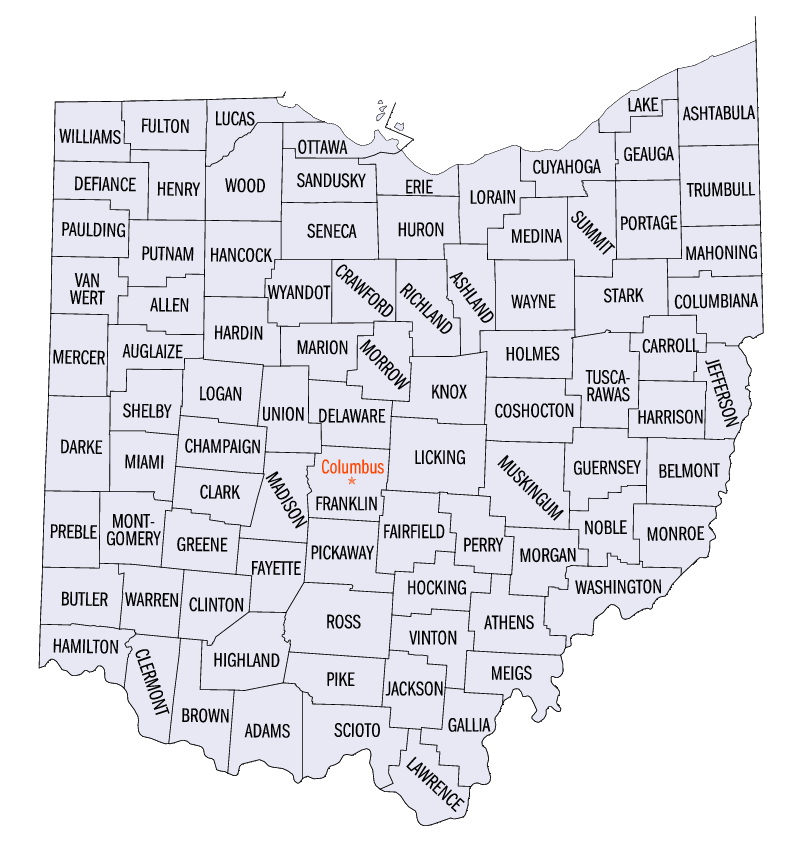
Ohio counties (clickable map)

This is a list of properties and districts in Ohio that are listed on the National Register of Historic Places. There are over 4,000 in total. Of these, 73 are National Historic Landmarks. There are listings in each of Ohio's 88 counties.

The locations of National Register properties and districts (at least for all showing latitude and longitude coordinates below), may be seen in an online map by clicking on "Map of all coordinates". (Note: The latitude and longitude information provided in this table was derived originally from the National Register Information System, which has been found to be fairly accurate for about 99% of listings. Some locations in this table may have been corrected to current GPS standards.)

This National Park Service list is complete through NPS recent listings posted October 23, 2026.

== Current listings by county ==
The following are approximate tallies of current listings by county. These counts are based on entries in the National Register Information Database as of April 24, 2008 and new weekly listings posted since then on the National Register of Historic Places web site. There are frequent additions to the listings and occasional delistings and the counts here are approximate and not official. New entries are added to the official Register on a weekly basis. Also, the counts in this table exclude boundary increase and decrease listings which modify the area covered by an existing property or district and which carry a separate National Register reference number.

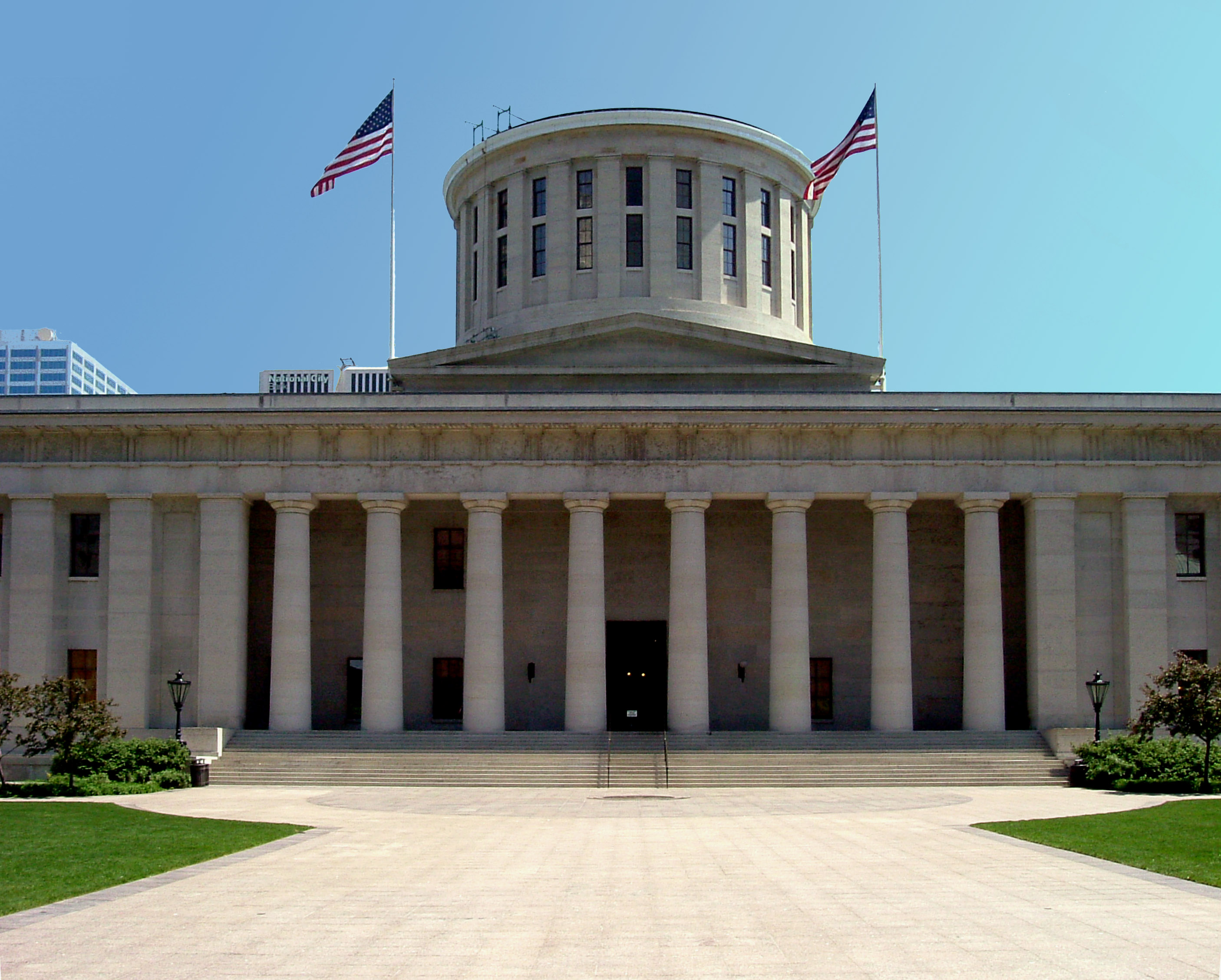
Ohio Statehouse, in Franklin County

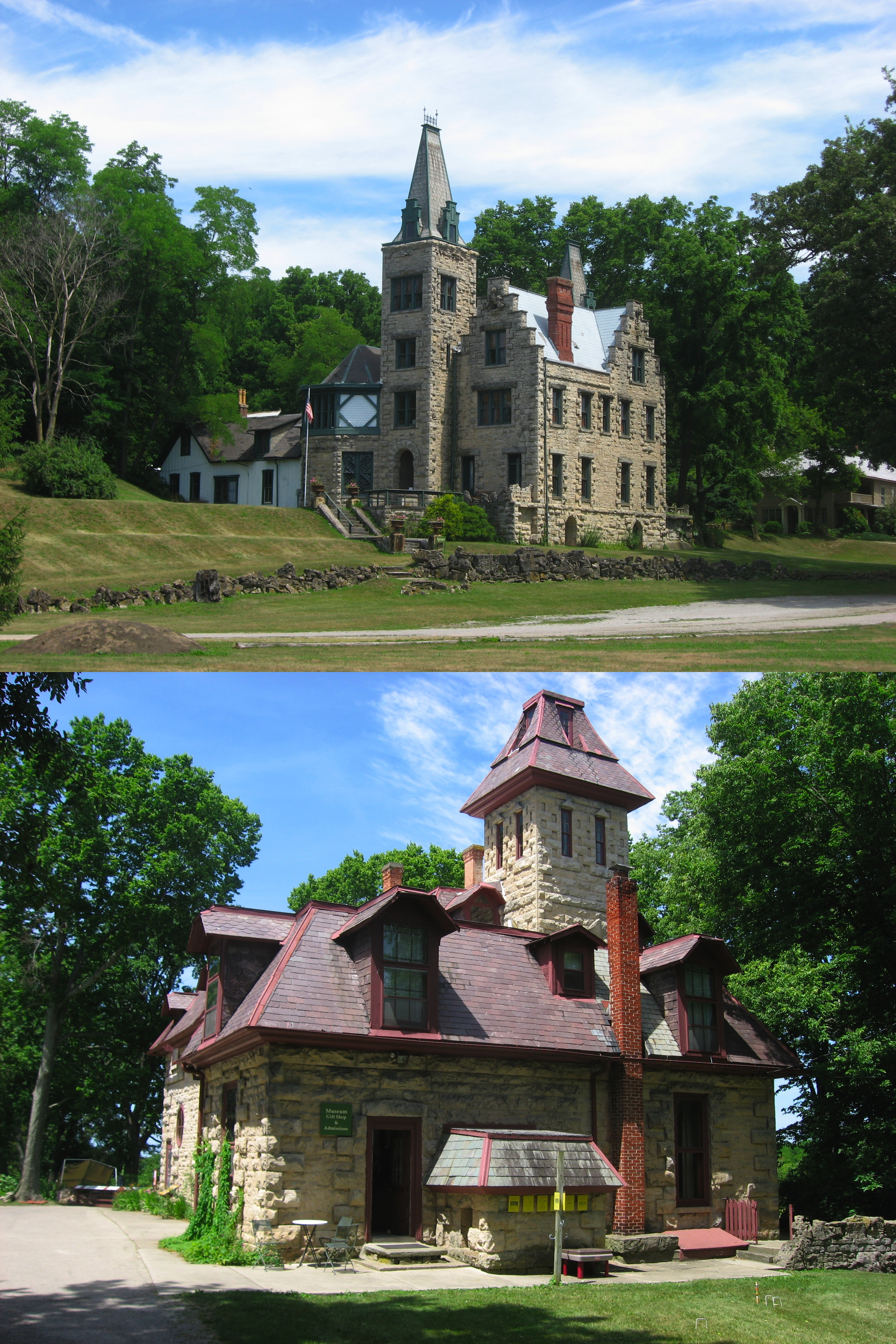
Abram S. Piatt House and Donn S. Piatt House, in Logan County

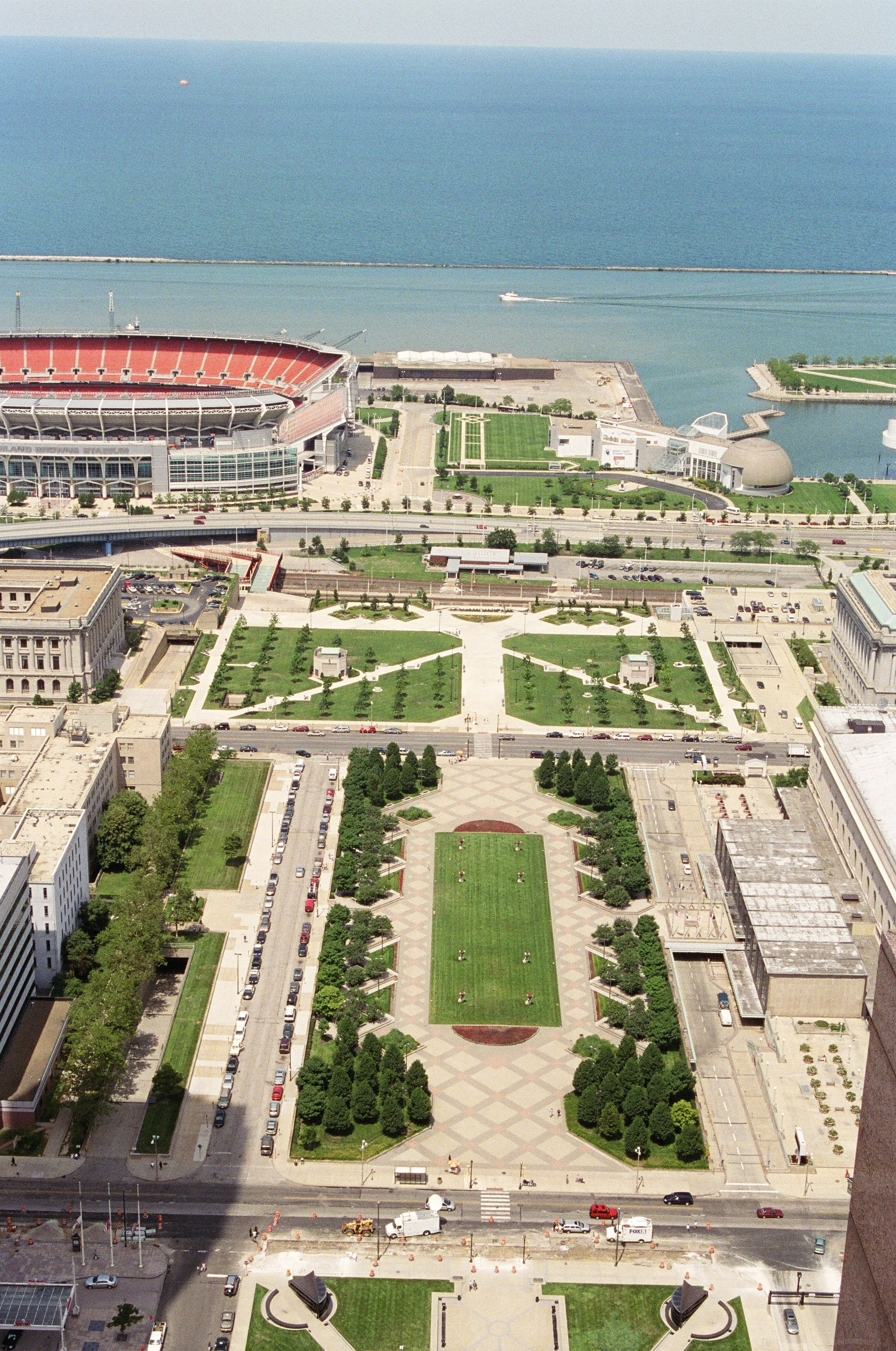
Cleveland Mall, in Cuyahoga County

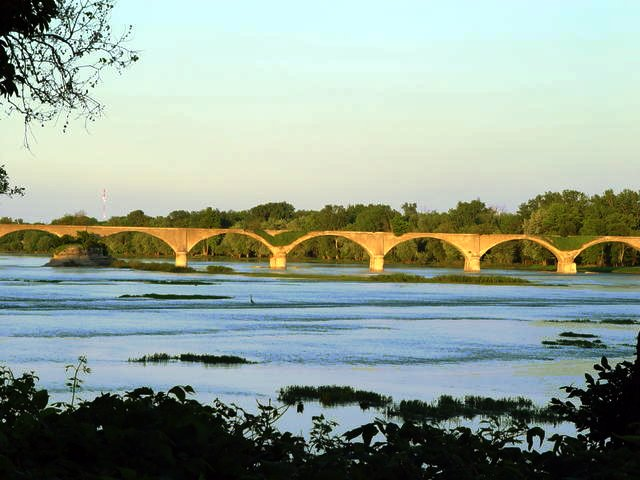
Interurban Bridge, in Wood County

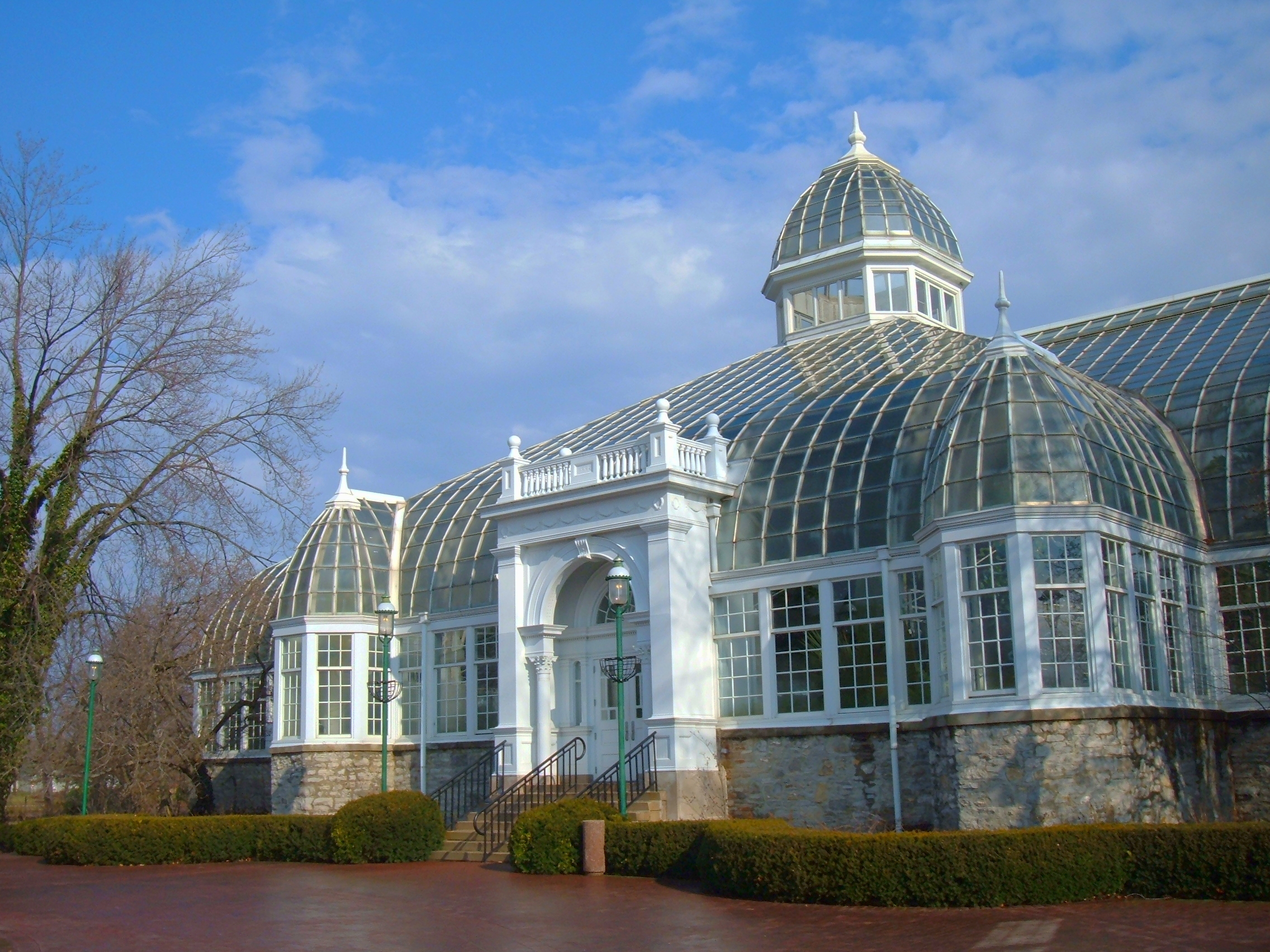
Franklin Park Conservatory, in Franklin County

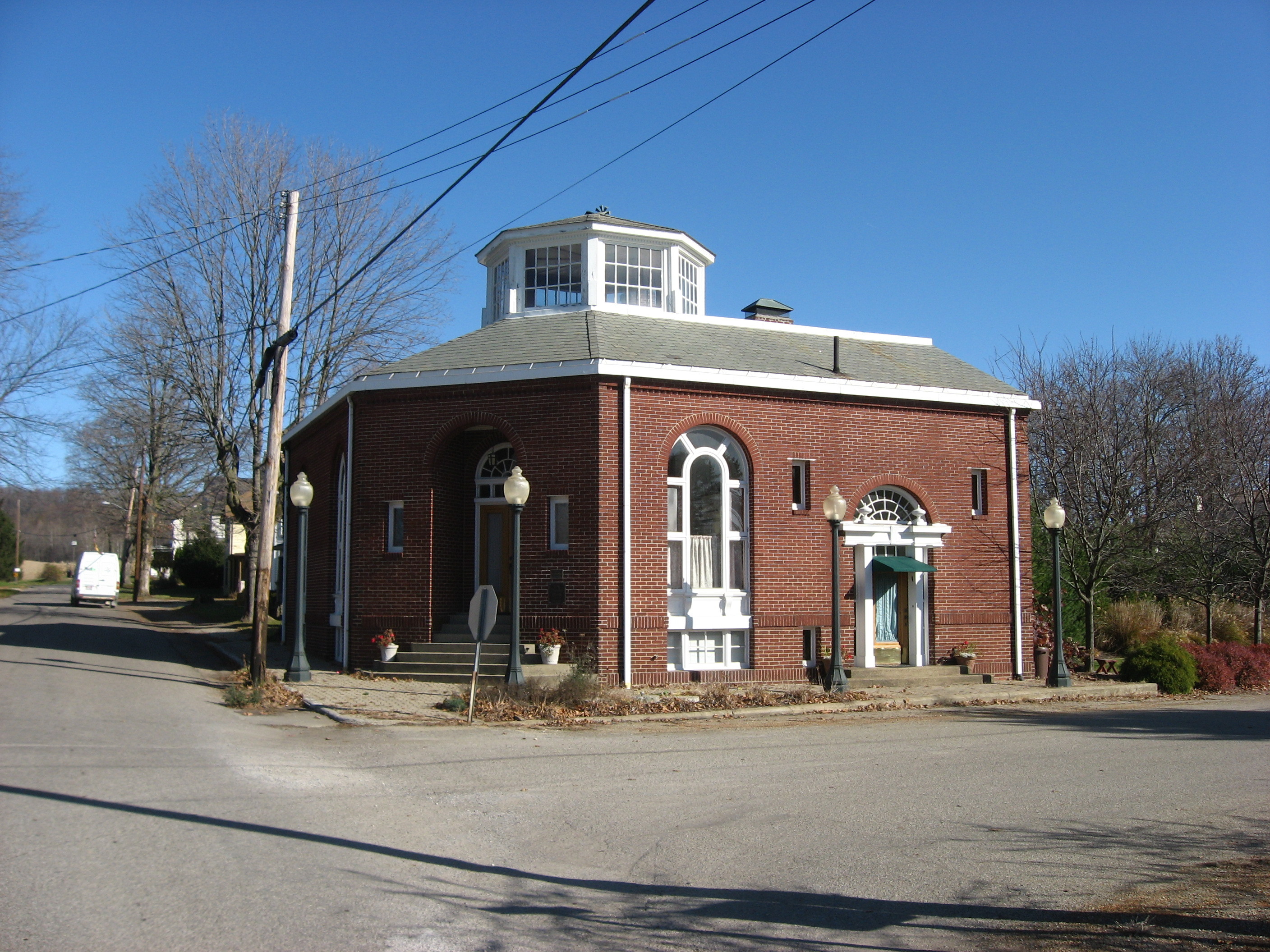
Glenford Bank, in Perry County

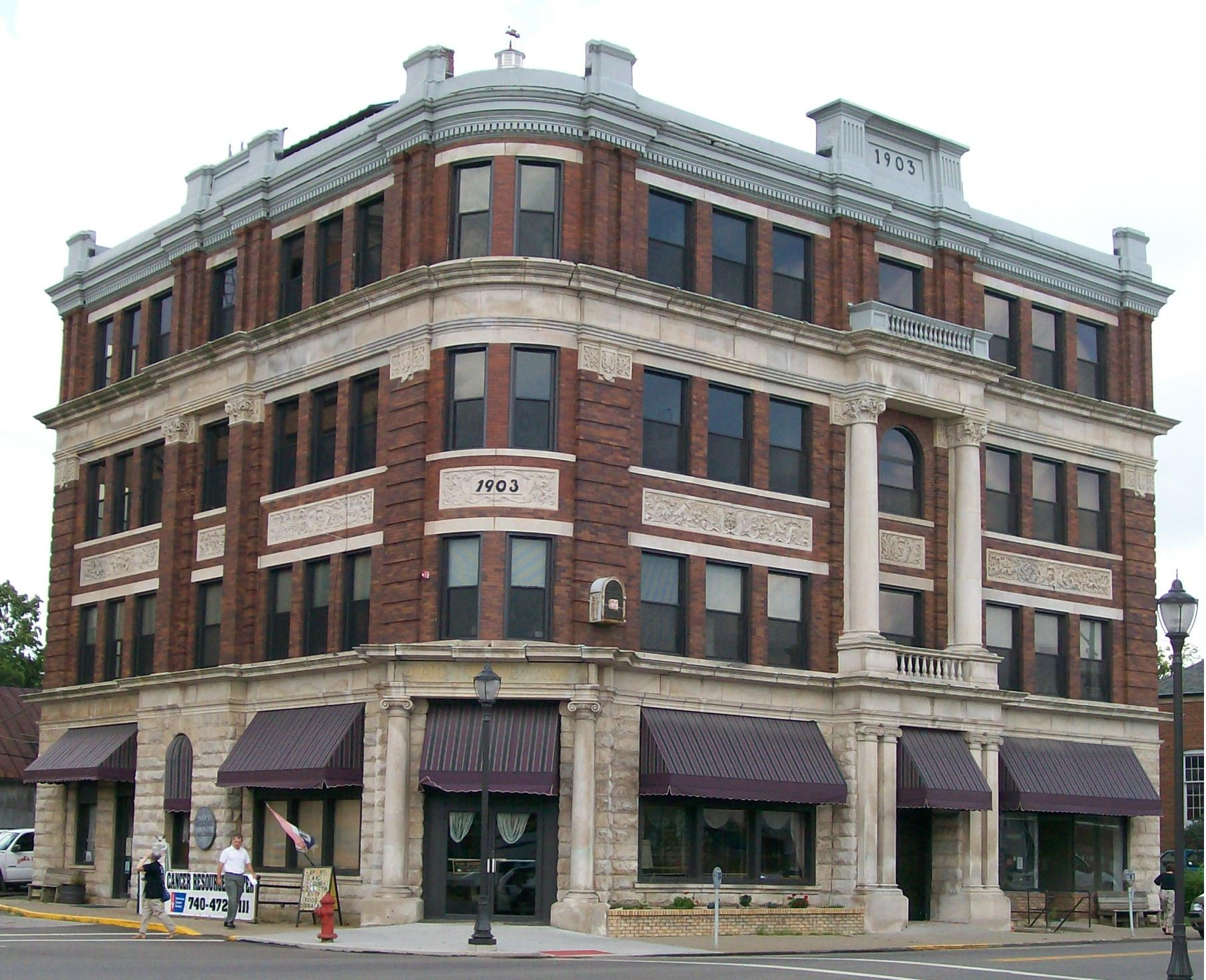
Monroe Bank, in Monroe County

	County	# of Sites
1	Adams	16
2	Allen	31
3	Ashland	19
4	Ashtabula	41
5	Athens	29
6	Auglaize	24
7	Belmont	29
8	Brown	26
9	Butler	93
10	Carroll	12
11	Champaign	35
12	Clark	43
13	Clermont	28
14	Clinton	18
15	Columbiana	45
16	Coshocton	20
17	Crawford	26
18.1	Cuyahoga: Cleveland	285
18.2	Cuyahoga: Other	166
18.3	Cuyahoga: Duplicates	4 (Note: Fairhill Road Village Historic District (Cleveland and Cleveland Heights), Garfield Memorial (Cleveland and Cleveland Heights), Shaker Village Historic District (Cleveland, Cleveland Heights, and Shaker Heights), Woodland-Larchmere Commercial Historic District (Cleveland and Shaker Heights))
18.4	Cuyahoga: Total	447
19	Darke	26
20	Defiance	12
21	Delaware	60
22.1	Erie: Sandusky	114
22.2	Erie: Other	65
22.3	Erie: Total	179
23	Fairfield	50
24	Fayette	17
25.1	Franklin: Columbus	185
25.2	Franklin: Other	177
25.3	Franklin: Total	362
26	Fulton	7
27	Gallia	8
28	Geauga	18
29	Greene	47
30	Guernsey	22
31.1a	Hamilton: Cincinnati: Downtown	62
31.1b	Hamilton: Cincinnati: East	137
31.1c	Hamilton: Cincinnati: West	99
31.1d	Hamilton: Cincinnati: Duplicates	(1) (Note: The Over-the-Rhine Historic District is split between eastern and western Cincinnati.)
31.1e	Hamilton: Cincinnati: Total	298
31.2	Hamilton: Other	100
31.3	Hamilton: Total	398
32	Hancock	14
33	Hardin	7
34	Harrison	7
35	Henry	4
36	Highland	28
37	Hocking	14
38	Holmes	16
39	Huron	18
40	Jackson	14
41	Jefferson	26
42	Knox	45
43	Lake	81
44	Lawrence	20
45	Licking	65
46	Logan	10
47	Lorain	124
48	Lucas	101
49	Madison	11
50	Mahoning	75
51	Marion	19
52	Medina	33
53	Meigs	9
54	Mercer	30
55	Miami	47
56	Monroe	11
57.1	Montgomery: Dayton	118
57.2	Montgomery: Other	44
57.2	Montgomery: Duplicates	(1) (Note: Miami Valley Golf Course and Clubhouse)
57.4	Montgomery: Total	161
58	Morgan	6
59	Morrow	15
60	Muskingum	84
61	Noble	11
62	Ottawa	31
63	Paulding	5
64	Perry	15
65	Pickaway	33
66	Pike	8
67	Portage	50
68	Preble	20
69	Putnam	10
70	Richland	70
71	Ross	45
72	Sandusky	12
73	Scioto	42
74	Seneca	45
75	Shelby	20
76	Stark	91
77.1	Summit: Akron	64
77.2	Summit: Other	125
77.3	Summit: Duplicates	1 (Note: The Valley Railway Historic District is split between Akron and several other communities in Summit County.)
77.4	Summit: Total	188
78	Trumbull	40
79	Tuscarawas	26
80	Union	11
81	Van Wert	8
82	Vinton	11
83	Warren	54
84	Washington	37
85	Wayne	21
86	Williams	7
87	Wood	33
88	Wyandot	10
(duplicates)		(21) (Note: The following sites are listed in multiple counties: Adams-Gray House (Coshocton and Muskingum), Brecksville-Northfield High Level Bridge (Cuyahoga and Summit), Dean Road Bridge (Erie and Lorain), Hocking Valley Railway Historic District (Athens and Hocking), Interurban Bridge (Lucas and Wood), Jaite Mill Historic District (Cuyahoga and Summit), Lockington Locks Historical Area (Miami and Shelby), Lynchburg Covered Bridge (Clinton and Highland), Miami and Erie Canal Deep Cut (Allen and Auglaize), Muskingum River Navigation Historic District (Coshocton, Morgan, Muskingum, and Washington), Ohio and Erie Canal (Cuyahoga and Summit), Plymouth Historic District (Huron and Richland), Seven Ranges Terminus (Carroll, Stark, and Tuscarawas), Station Road Bridge (Cuyahoga and Summit), and Valley Railway Historic District (Cuyahoga and Summit), Ohio & Erie Canal Southern Descent Historic District (Fairfield, Franklin, Pickaway and Scioto).)
Total:		4,214

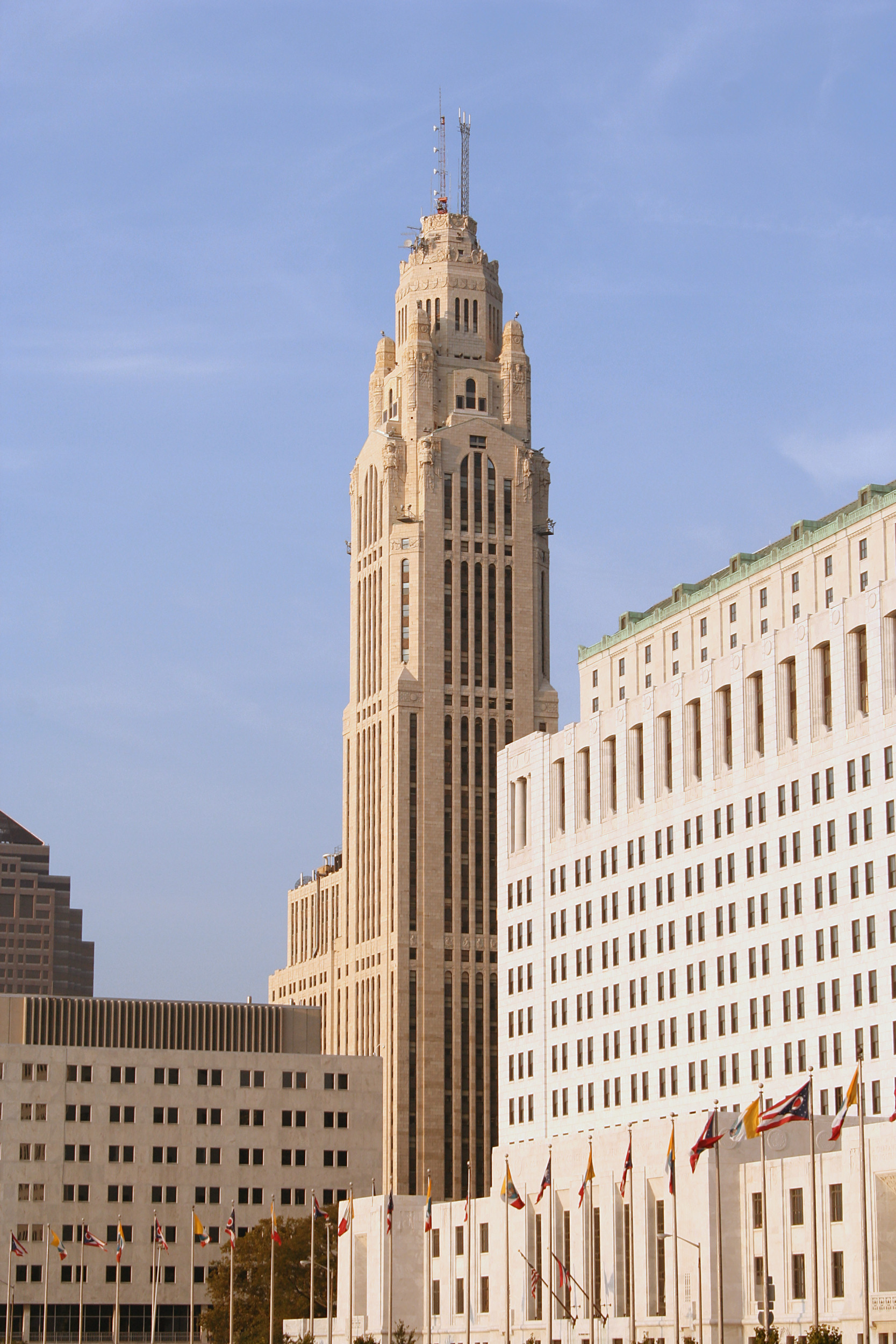
LeVeque Tower, in Franklin County

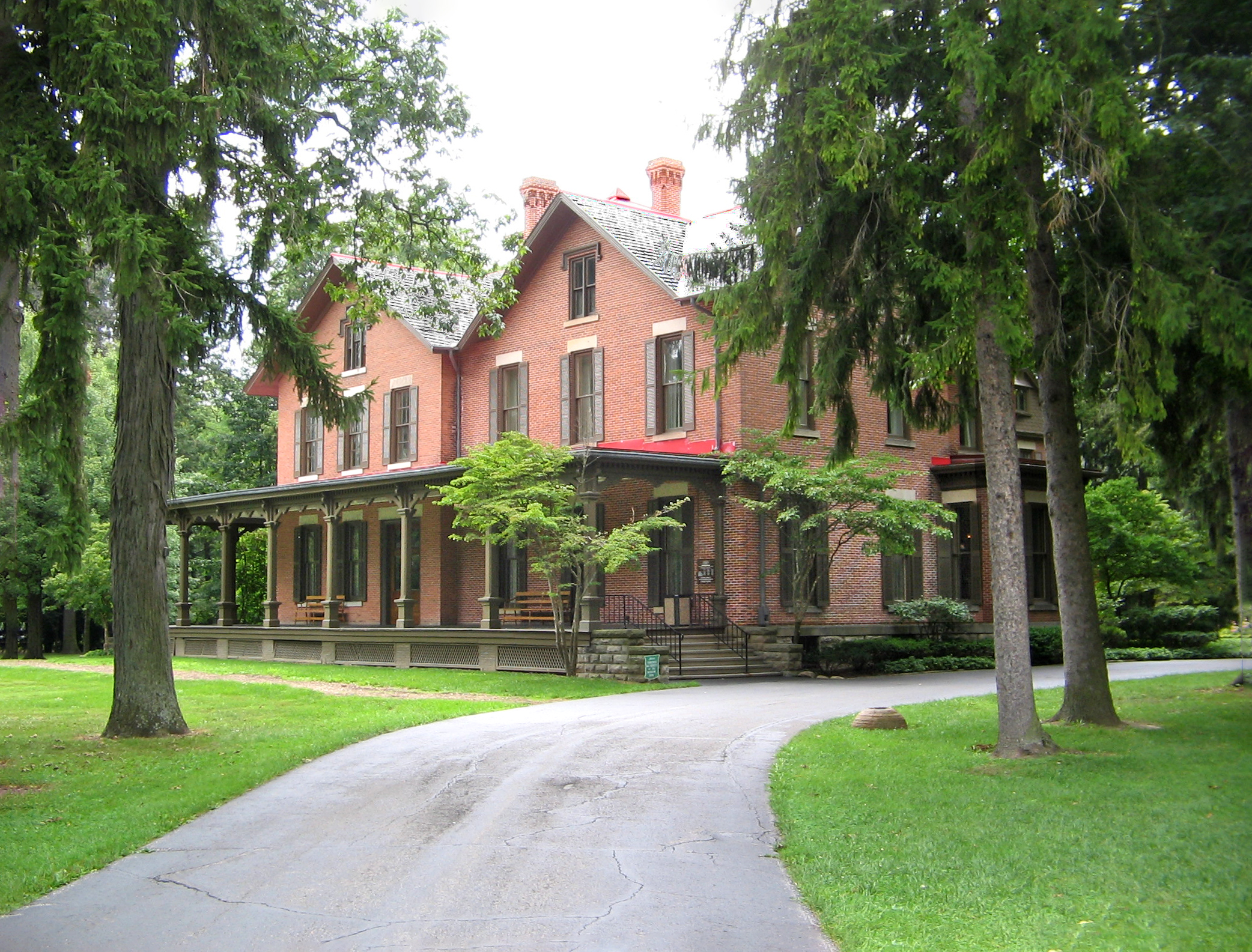
Rutherford B. Hayes House, National Historic Landmark in Sandusky County

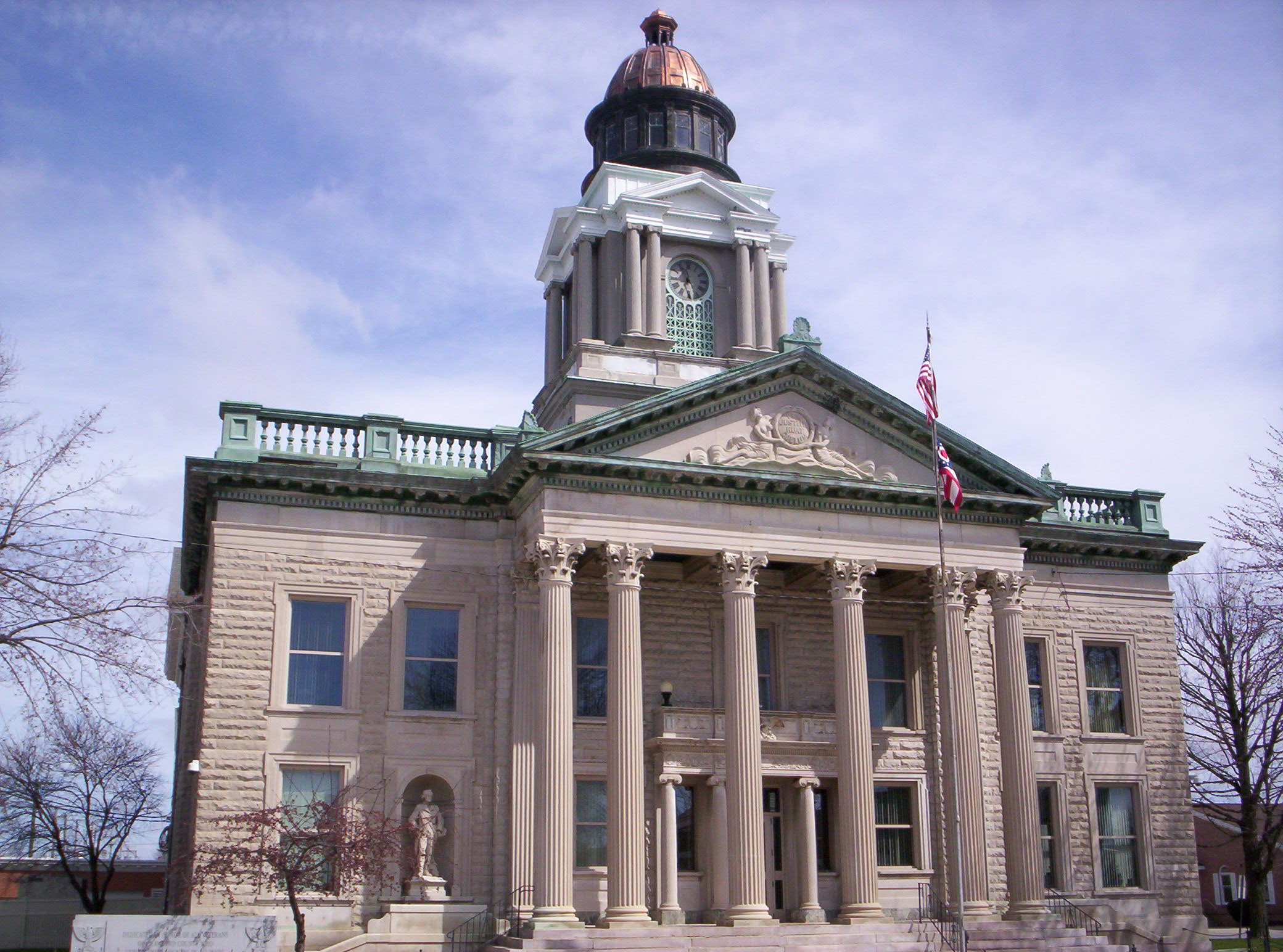
Bucyrus Commercial Historic District, in Crawford County

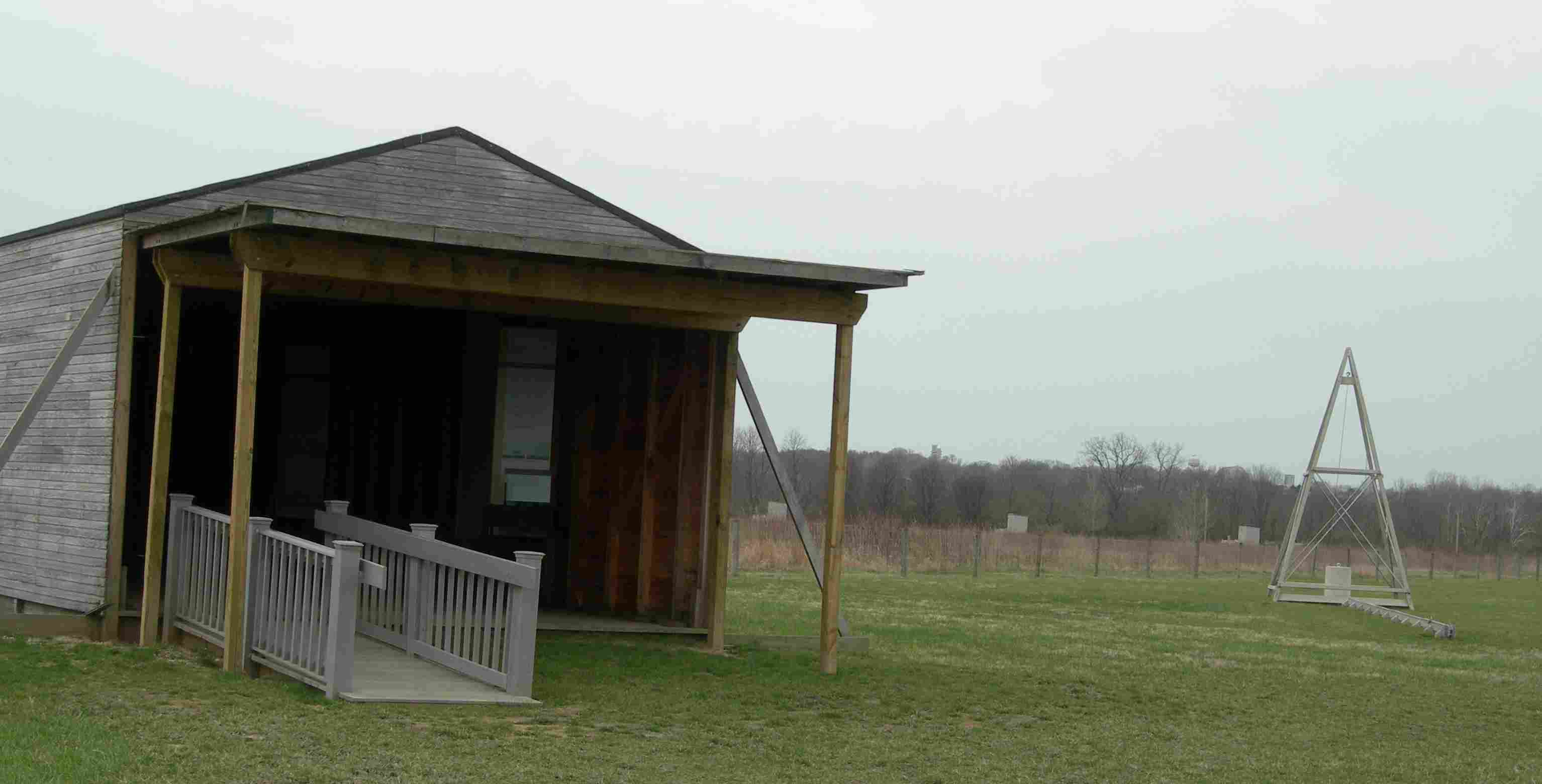
Huffman Field, National Historic Landmark in Greene County

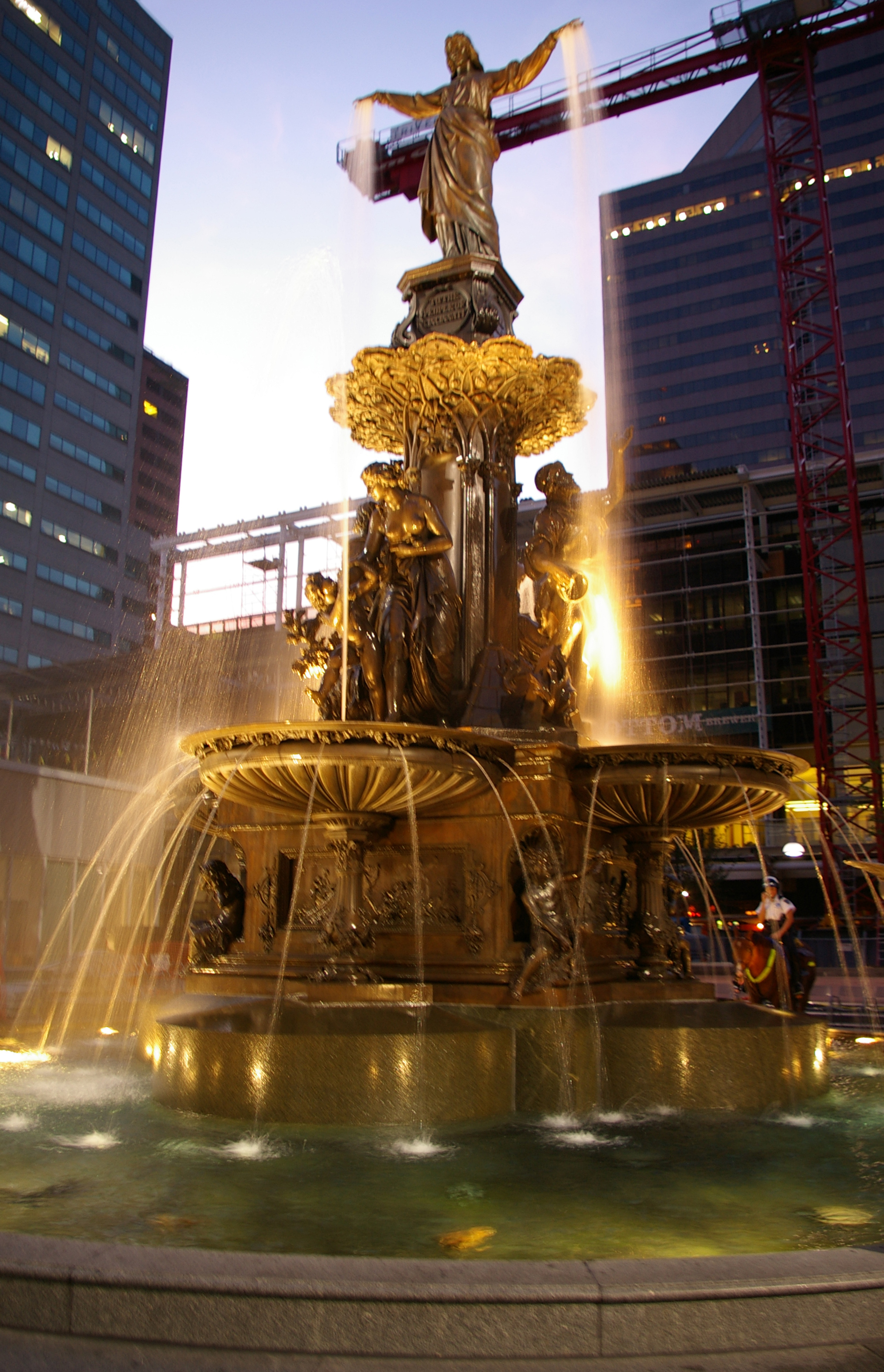
Tyler Davidson Fountain, in Hamilton County

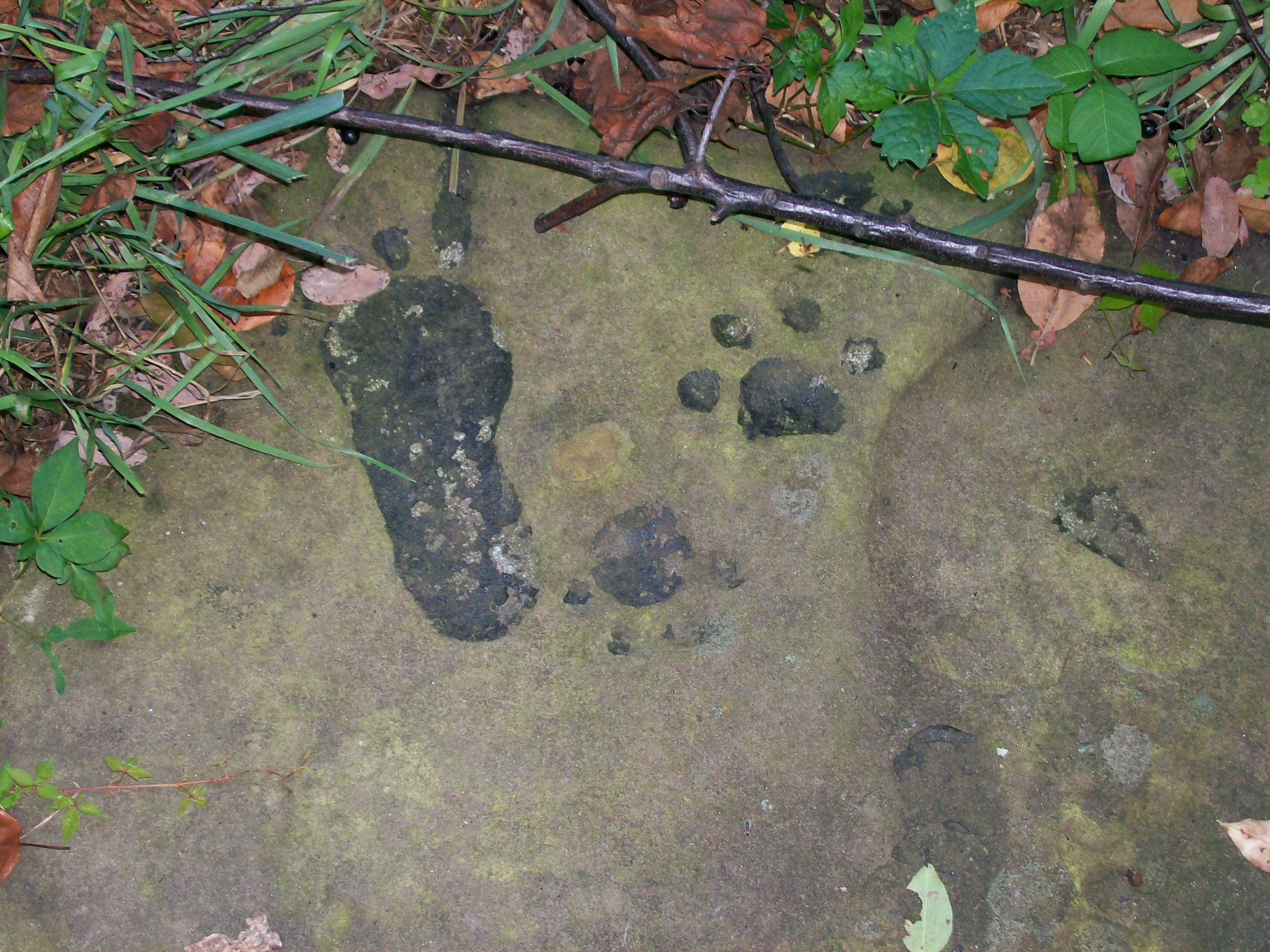
Barnesville Petroglyph, in Belmont County

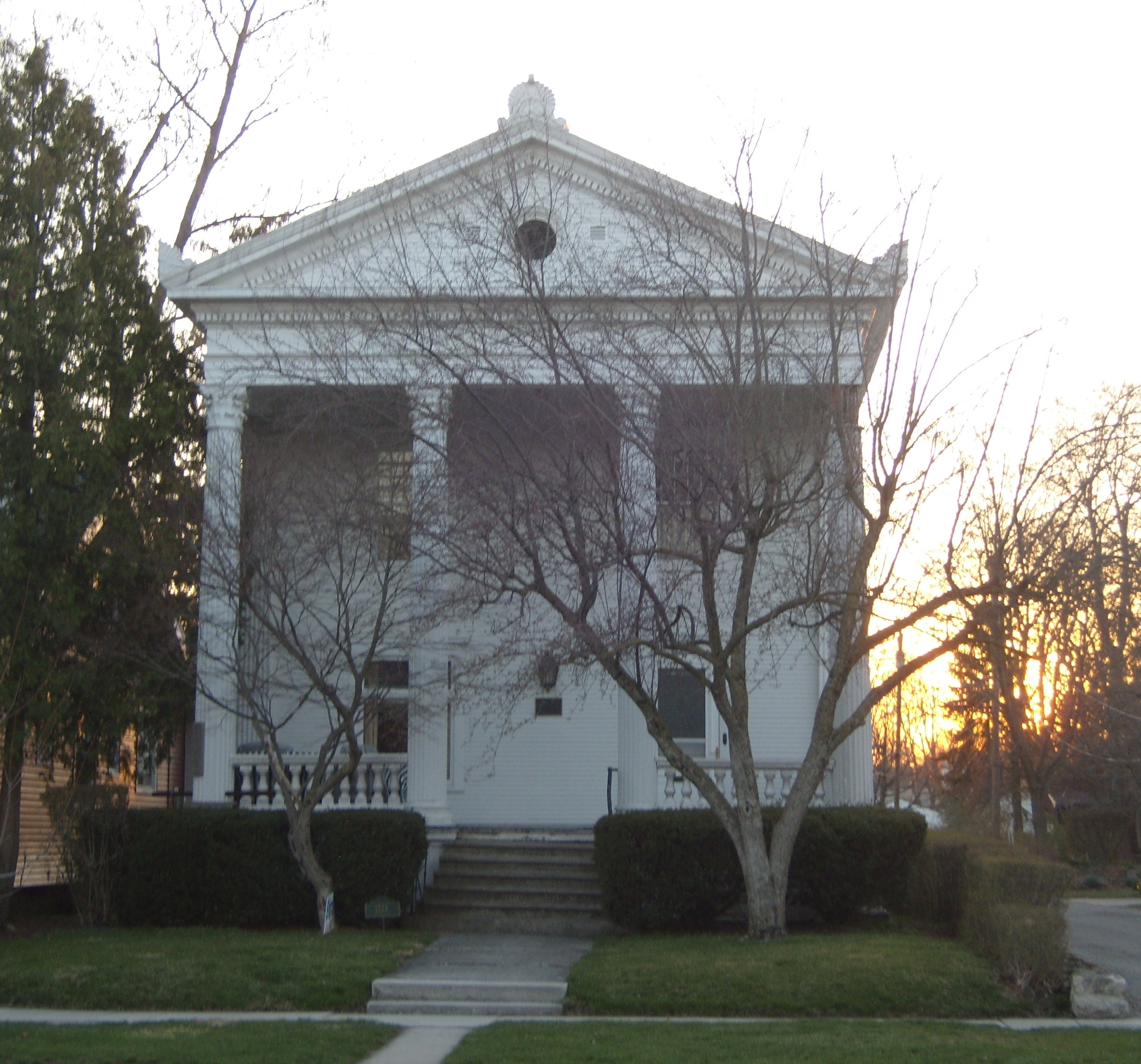
Dr. Albert Linaweaver House, in Hancock County

== See also ==
- List of National Historic Landmarks in Ohio
- List of bridges on the National Register of Historic Places in Ohio
- List of historical societies in Ohio
