= Valley Railway Historic District =

Historic district in Ohio, United States

- U.S. National Register of Historic Places
- U.S. Historic district
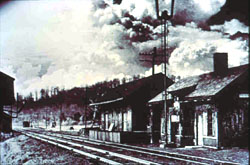
- Historic View of the Valley Railway

- Location within Ohio Location within the United States
- Location: Cuyahoga Valley between Rockside Rd. at Cuyahoga National Recreation Area and Howard St. at Little Cuyahoga Valley, Akron, Ohio
- Coordinates: 41°13′38″N 81°34′13″W
- Area: 178 acres (72 ha)
- Built: 1871
- Architect: Valley Railway
- NRHP reference No.: 85001123
- Added to NRHP: May 17, 1985

The Valley Railway Historic District is a historic district partially located in the Cuyahoga Valley National Park, extending from Independence to Akron, Ohio. It was added to the National Register of Historic Places in 1985.

== History ==
The Valley Railway was constructed in 1880 to link Cleveland's growing steel industry and the rich coal fields of the Tuscarawas River Valley, extending south to Zoarville. Although the first railroad came to Cleveland in 1854, the majority of the rail lines ran east–west and did not connect the metropolitan and industrial centers of Cleveland, Akron and Canton. The Valley Railway was built next to, and sometimes on top of, the Ohio and Erie Canal. The Valley Railway provided a faster transport for the coal needed to fuel the new industrial economy.

Although the railway primarily functioned as an industrial and freight carrier, the railway published "The Travelers and Tourists Guide to the Valley Railway!" to promote its passenger service. This guidebook describes the origins and character of many towns and notable natural features along the route. The Valley Railway brought an increase in noise and pollution to the quiet rural valley. The guidebook was a common promotional piece used to make the railway seem more recreational than industrial. Many believed that the presence of the railroad in pastoral landscapes all around the country, referred to as the "machine in the garden," represented a significant shift away from an agrarian society towards an industrial one.

In 1895 the Valley Railway became the Cleveland, Terminal and Valley Railway. In 1915 the line was absorbed into the Baltimore and Ohio system. Although many small independent lines from this era were absorbed into larger lines and acquired parallel tracks, the Valley Railway retains single track alignment and has been well preserved. A great deal of the track runs through the Cuyahoga Valley National Park, which has preserved the cultural landscape of the valley and prevented modern intrusions into it. Today the Cuyahoga Valley Scenic Railroad runs excursion service extending from Cuyahoga County to Canton.
