= Zoarville, Ohio =

Unincorporated community in Ohio, U.S.

Coordinates: 40°35′04″N 81°23′21″W

Zoarville is an unincorporated community in Tuscarawas County, in the U.S. state of Ohio.

== History ==
Zoarville was platted in 1882 under the name Valley City. Another variant name was Zoarville Station. A post office called Zoar Station was established in 1861, the name was changed to Zoarville in 1914, and the post office closed in 1983.
