= Jaite Mill Historic District =

Historic district in Ohio, United States

- U.S. National Register of Historic Places
- U.S. Historic district
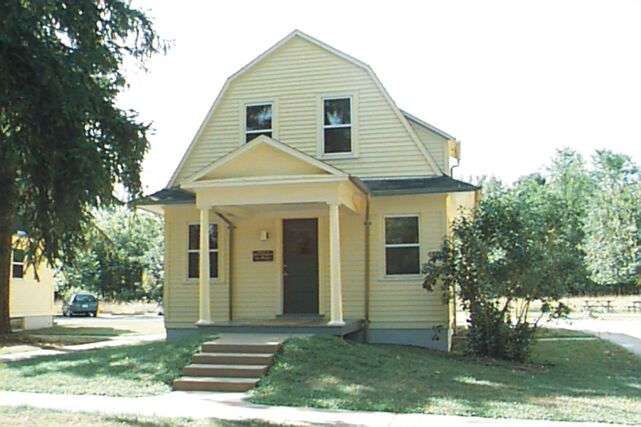
- Jaite Mill Worker's House

- Location within Ohio Location within the United States
- Nearest city: Brecksville, Ohio
- Coordinates: 41°17′10″N 81°34′6″W
- Area: 30 acres (12 ha)
- Built: 1903
- Architectural style: Classic Eclectic
- NRHP reference No.: 79000288
- Added to NRHP: May 21, 1979

The Jaite Mill Historic District, also known as Jaite, is a nationally recognized historic district in Cuyahoga and Summit counties in the U.S. state of Ohio. The Cuyahoga County portion of the district is located in the city of Brecksville, while the Summit County portion is located in Sagamore Hills Township. Built in 1903 as the Jaite Company Paper Mill, its center is at the intersection of Vaughn and Riverview roads, north of the crossing of Interstates 80 and 271.

On May 21, 1979, the former company town was added to the National Register of Historic Places. Today it is the trailhead of several hiking routes in the Cuyahoga Valley National Park, and is on the way to the Boston Mills and Brandywine ski resorts.

== History ==
The Jaite Company Paper Mill was the brain child of Charles Jaite, who founded the company on September 18, 1905. The mill remained in operation through 1951 and was then sold because of increasing competition in the south. After the property was sold to various owners, including Tecumseh who used the plant for making boxes, it ceased operation and was partially dismantled in 1984, some 5 years after the mill was included in the National Register of Historic Places. The remains of the factory can be seen on the Erie Canal Scenic Pathway somewhere around mile marker 19 or 20, between lock 31 and 32. When the factory's operation began to decline, the community of Jaite declined as well.

Charles Jaite purchased the section of land along Riverview Road in 1906 and along Vaughn Road in 1917 to provide housing for the workers of his paper mill. It had "houses and a dormitory, and also a general store, post office, and railway station". Today, most of the buildings of Jaite still exist, painted yellow. Some are occupied by businesses but most are occupied by operations of the National Park Service.

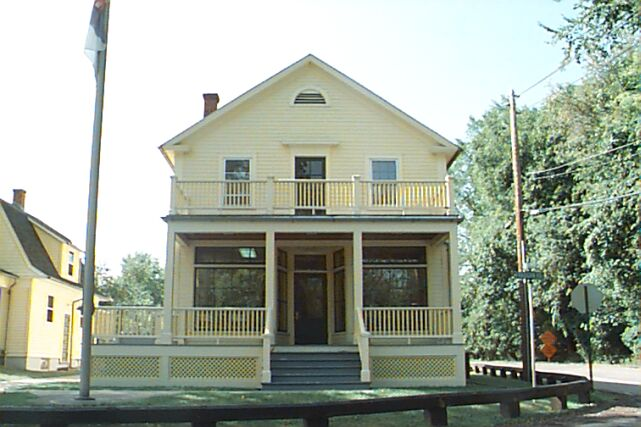
Jaite Company Store, now the Cuyahoga Valley National Park Headquarters

== See also ==
- National Register of Historic Places listings in Cuyahoga County, Ohio
- National Register of Historic Places listings in Summit County, Ohio
