= National Register of Historic Places listings in Paulding County, Ohio =

Location of Paulding County in Ohio

This is a list of the National Register of Historic Places listings in Paulding County, Ohio.

It is intended to be a complete list of the properties on the National Register of Historic Places in Paulding County, Ohio, United States. The locations of National Register properties for which the latitude and longitude coordinates are included below, may be seen in a Google map.

There are 5 properties listed on the National Register in the county.

This National Park Service list is complete through NPS recent listings posted March 14, 2025.

== Current listings ==
	Name on the Register	Image	Date listed	Location	City or town	Description
1	Antwerp Norfolk and Western Depot	Antwerp Norfolk and Western Depot	September 23, 1980 (#80003205)	W. River St. 41°10′45″N 84°44′51″W	Antwerp	
2	Paulding County Carnegie Library	Paulding County Carnegie Library	April 21, 1983 (#83002021)	205 S. Main St. 41°08′10″N 84°34′45″W	Paulding	
3	Paulding County Courthouse	Paulding County Courthouse	May 3, 1974 (#74001589)	Courthouse Sq. 41°08′15″N 84°34′49″W	Paulding	
4	Paulding Downtown Historic District	Paulding Downtown Historic District	March 28, 2024 (#100010114)	Centered on the Paulding County Courthouse and roughly bounded by Harrison, Water, Caroline and Cherry Streets; 41°08′18″N 84°34′51″W	Paulding	
5	Round Barn	Round Barn	April 17, 1980 (#80003206)	Northern side of Township Road 168, northeast of Paulding; 41°10′08″N 84°31′37″W	Emerald Township	

== See also ==
- List of National Historic Landmarks in Ohio
- Listings in neighboring counties: Allen (IN), Defiance, Putnam, Van Wert
- National Register of Historic Places listings in Ohio
