= National Register of Historic Places listings in Putnam County, Ohio =

Location of Putnam County in Ohio

This is a list of the National Register of Historic Places listings in Putnam County, Ohio.

This is intended to be a complete list of the properties and districts on the National Register of Historic Places in Putnam County, Ohio, United States. The locations of National Register properties and districts for which the latitude and longitude coordinates are included below, may be seen in a Google map.

There are 10 properties and districts listed on the National Register in the county.

This National Park Service list is complete through NPS recent listings posted August 28, 2026.

== Current listings ==
| | Name on the Register | Image | Date listed | Location | City or town | Description |
|---|---|---|---|---|---|---|
| 1 | Bridenbaugh District No. 3 Schoolhouse | Bridenbaugh District No. 3 Schoolhouse | April 28, 2005 (#05000343) | Junction of County Road 6 and Township Road M6, north of Pandora; 40°58′40″N 83°58′37″W | Riley Township | |
| 2 | Columbus Grove Municipal Pool | Columbus Grove Municipal Pool | May 30, 1997 (#97000511) | 47510 Road P, northeast of Columbus Grove; 40°55′37″N 84°01′31″W | Pleasant Township | |
| 3 | John Edwards House | John Edwards House | November 27, 1978 (#78002177) | 305 W. Main St. 41°06′05″N 83°59′27″W | Leipsic | |
| 4 | Gilboa Main Street Historic District | Gilboa Main Street Historic District | February 27, 1979 (#79001927) | Main St. 41°00′59″N 83°55′21″W | Gilboa | |
| 5 | Dr. H. Huber Block | Dr. H. Huber Block | June 4, 1980 (#80003213) | Main St. and Taft Ave. 41°01′09″N 84°02′52″W | Ottawa | |
| 6 | Leipsic City Hall | | June 20, 1979 (#79001928) | Belmore St. 41°05′52″N 83°59′06″W | Leipsic | Destroyed |
| 7 | Ottawa Waterworks Building | Ottawa Waterworks Building | September 13, 1976 (#76001519) | 1035 E. 3rd St. 41°01′17″N 84°02′12″W | Ottawa | |
| 8 | Putnam County Courthouse | Putnam County Courthouse | May 3, 1974 (#74001608) | Courthouse Sq. 41°01′11″N 84°02′47″W | Ottawa | |
| 9 | Round Barn | | April 17, 1980 (#80003212) | Road 17N south of Kalida; 40°57′00″N 84°11′38″W | Union Township | Destroyed |
| 10 | St. John the Baptist Roman Catholic Church | St. John the Baptist Roman Catholic Church | June 17, 1977 (#77001083) | State Route 694 and Main St. 41°01′50″N 84°04′46″W | Glandorf | |

== See also ==
- List of National Historic Landmarks in Ohio
- Listings in neighboring counties: Allen, Defiance, Hancock, Henry, Paulding, Van Wert, Wood
- National Register of Historic Places listings in Ohio
