= Paulding County Carnegie Library =

- U.S. National Register of Historic Places
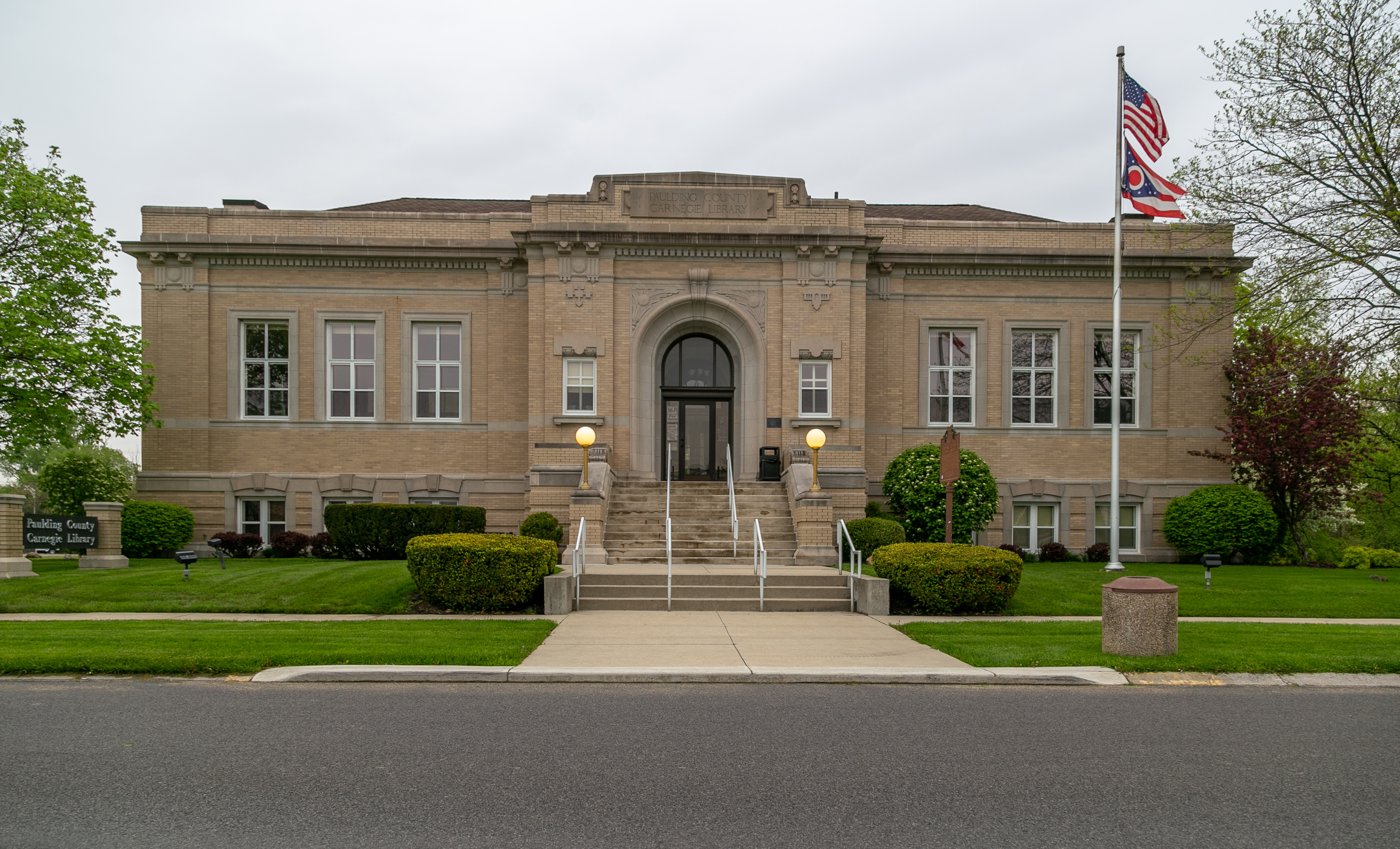
- Front of the library

- Location within Ohio Location within the United States
- Location: 205 S. Main St., Paulding, Ohio
- Coordinates: 41°8′10″N 84°34′45″W
- Area: Less than 1 acre (0.40 ha)
- Built: 1912
- Architect: Howard & Merriam
- Architectural style: Beaux-Arts
- NRHP reference No.: 83002021
- Added to NRHP: April 21, 1983

The Paulding County Carnegie Library is a historic Carnegie library in the village of Paulding, Ohio, United States. Constructed in the early twentieth century, it is a simple building that has served as the core of Paulding County's library system since its construction, and it has been designated a historic site.

== History ==
As late as the 1890s, Paulding lacked a library of any sort. Finding this situation undesirable, members of a local women's club subscribed money to establish a small collection in 1893. Ten years later, multiple groups of local citizens met to organize a public library, which began with a collection of six hundred books. In its earliest years, the library had no fixed home: it itinerated among downtown storefronts and different homes, including the house of the librarian herself.

In the late nineteenth and early twentieth centuries, the construction of public libraries was proceeding rapidly, due in part to the generosity of steel tycoon Andrew Carnegie. Many large and small cities, such as the Ohio communities of Columbus and East Liverpool, constructed libraries with money donated by Carnegie, but none had been built in small villages such as Paulding. Nevertheless, local residents worked to secure money from Carnegie, and their efforts succeeded where all before them had failed: his grant provided for the establishment of a library to serve the entirety of Paulding County. Built with this donation, the Paulding County Carnegie Library was the first Carnegie library to serve an entire county instead of a single city.

The process of obtaining the money for the library and constructing the building with the resulting funds occupied approximately three years, beginning in 1912 and concluding in 1914. Since its completion, the library has never been significantly modified, and it remains a significant part of the community. Located on South Main Street near downtown, the library remains one of Paulding's most important community buildings and a center of local pride.

== Architecture ==
In 1911, Andrew Carnegie's private secretary, James Bertram, published a set of guidelines that he saw as ideal for library architecture. Since three years previously, he had required libraries to submit plans for his approval before releasing money, due to what he saw as overly ornate designs being built with his employer's money. The Paulding County Carnegie Library is one of the best examples of Bertram's guidelines: instead of ornate entryways and runaway detailing, its design maximizes the amount of space devoted to the interior, and the floor plan is designed for maximum efficiency. The library board chose a design submitted by a Columbus company, Howard and Merriam, which had already produced the design for the Rutherford B. Hayes Presidential Center.

Howard and Merriam chose a design built primarily with brick walls and elements of stone. Although the main floor is elevated above ground level, the building is a single-story structure; its full basement is elevated partially above the surface of the ground. The brickwork is primarily built in a French fashion; the gray bricks are matched by details of similarly colored limestone from Bedford, Indiana. Patrons enter the library by climbing a stairway with a stone balustrade to a central entrance that sits within a stone archway; small Palladian windows with stone pediments are placed on each side of the entrance. Among the details visible on the building's exterior are pilasters on all of its corners, string courses that parallel the lintels, multiple cartouches, and an elaborate cornice. Inside, the library features six rooms: three large book rooms, a vestibule, a lobby, and an office. The design of the interior includes elements such as marble in the vestibule, oak panels and decorations in the reading rooms, fireplaces, and Tuscan pilasters. Although its architecture is restrained, the library remains a fine example of Neoclassical architecture with a Beaux-Arts influence.

== Historic designation ==
In 1983, the Paulding County Carnegie Library was listed on the National Register of Historic Places, qualifying because of its historically significant architecture and its place in local history. Most important to its place in local history was its role as the first county-level Carnegie library: its establishment prompted many other small communities to apply for library grants from the Carnegie Corporation, making it an example of the spread of the self-improvement and adult education movements to rural areas in the early twentieth century. Today, the library is one of four Paulding County historic sites on the National Register, along with the nearby Paulding County Courthouse, the former train station in Antwerp, and a round barn near Paulding.

The Paulding County Carnegie Library is the center of the Paulding County library system, which also operates branches in the villages of Antwerp, Oakwood, and Payne.
