= National Register of Historic Places listings in Van Wert County, Ohio =

Location of Van Wert County in Ohio

This is a list of the National Register of Historic Places listings in Van Wert County, Ohio.

It is intended to be a complete list of the properties on the National Register of Historic Places in Van Wert County, Ohio, United States. The locations of National Register properties for which the latitude and longitude coordinates are included below, may be seen in an online map.

There are 8 properties listed on the National Register in the county. Another property was once listed but has been removed.

This National Park Service list is complete through NPS recent listings posted May 1, 2026.

== Current listings ==
| | Name on the Register | Image | Date listed | Location | City or town | Description |
|---|---|---|---|---|---|---|
| 1 | Bredeick-Lang House | Bredeick-Lang House | April 7, 1982 (#82003663) | 508 W. 2nd St. 40°50′38″N 84°20′43″W | Delphos | |
| 2 | Brumback Library | Brumback Library | January 29, 1979 (#79001973) | 215 W. Main St. 40°52′12″N 84°35′06″W | Van Wert | |
| 3 | Convoy Opera House-City Hall-Firehouse Building | | February 22, 2021 (#100006162) | 111 South Main St. 40°54′59″N 84°42′27″W | Convoy | |
| 4 | Downtown Van Wert Historic District | | February 16, 2021 (#100006140) | Roughly bounded by Jackson St., Town Creek, Central Ave., and Cherry St. 40°52′11″N 84°34′52″W | Van Wert | |
| 5 | Round Barn | Round Barn | April 17, 1980 (#80003240) | Off U.S. Route 224 west of Van Wert; 40°51′06″N 84°45′46″W | Harrison Township | |
| 6 | George H. Marsh Homestead and the Marsh Foundation School | George H. Marsh Homestead and the Marsh Foundation School | November 28, 1980 (#80003239) | 1229 Lincoln Highway; 40°52′17″N 84°33′53″W | Van Wert | |
| 7 | Van Wert Bandstand | Van Wert Bandstand | October 14, 1982 (#82001493) | On the grounds of the Van Wert County Historical Museum, 602 N. Washington St. 40°52′34″N 84°34′58″W | Van Wert | |
| 8 | Van Wert County Courthouse | Van Wert County Courthouse | July 30, 1974 (#74001639) | 121 E. Main St. 40°52′12″N 84°34′55″W | Van Wert | |

== Former listings ==
| | Name on the Register | Image | Date listed | Date removed | Location | City or town | Description |
|---|---|---|---|---|---|---|---|
| 1 | Willshire School | | November 25, 1980 (#80003241) | January 25, 2001 | Green St. | Willshire | |

== See also ==
- List of National Historic Landmarks in Ohio
- Listings in neighboring counties: Adams (IN), Allen, Allen (IN), Auglaize, Mercer, Paulding, Putnam
- National Register of Historic Places listings in Ohio
