= National Register of Historic Places listings in Defiance County, Ohio =

Location of Defiance County in Ohio

This is a list of the National Register of Historic Places listings in Defiance County, Ohio.

This is intended to be a complete list of the properties and districts on the National Register of Historic Places in Defiance County, Ohio, United States. The locations of National Register properties and districts for which the latitude and longitude coordinates are included below, may be seen in an online map.

There are 12 properties and districts listed on the National Register in the county. Another property was once listed but has been removed.

This National Park Service list is complete through NPS recent listings posted March 14, 2025.

== Current listings ==
	Name on the Register	Image	Date listed	Location	City or town	Description
1	Brooke Site	Brooke Site	January 1, 1976 (#76001412)	Between Watson Rd. and the Auglaize River, east of the Ohio Power Dam; 41°14′18″N 84°23′43″W	Defiance Township	
2	Defiance High School		September 9, 2019 (#100004356)	629 Arabella St. 41°16′54″N 84°21′54″W	Defiance	Former school, now houses school administration.
3	Defiance Public Library	Defiance Public Library	October 31, 1985 (#85003446)	320 Fort St. 41°17′16″N 84°21′31″W	Defiance	
4	Dey Road Bridge	Dey Road Bridge	February 5, 1999 (#99000095)	0.35 miles east of U.S. Route 24, west of Defiance; 41°17′25″N 84°23′08″W	Noble Township	
5	East Side Fire Station	East Side Fire Station	December 12, 1976 (#76001413)	Douglas and Hopkins Sts. 41°16′51″N 84°21′05″W	Defiance	
6	Fort Defiance Park	Fort Defiance Park	June 23, 1980 (#80002989)	Fort St. 41°17′15″N 84°21′24″W	Defiance	
7	Holgate Avenue Historic District	Holgate Avenue Historic District	October 11, 1990 (#90001497)	328-716 Holgate Ave. 41°17′09″N 84°22′10″W	Defiance	
8	Judge Alexander Latty House	Judge Alexander Latty House	January 25, 1991 (#90002214)	718 Perry St. 41°16′50″N 84°22′22″W	Defiance	
9	Riverside Chapel	Riverside Chapel	April 11, 1977 (#77001058)	S. Clinton St. in Riverside Cemetery; 41°16′24″N 84°22′42″W	Defiance	
10	Charles Speaker House	Charles Speaker House	April 25, 1997 (#97000374)	912 Holgate Ave. 41°16′57″N 84°22′28″W	Defiance	
11	St. Paul's Episcopal Church	St. Paul's Episcopal Church	June 7, 1976 (#76001414)	High St. 41°17′31″N 84°45′49″W	Hicksville	

== Former listing ==
	Name on the Register	Image	Date listed	Date removed	Location	City or town	Description
1	Sauer-Watson House	Sauer-Watson House	April 12, 1978 (#78002054)	July 6, 1981	530 Washington Street; 41°16′58″N 84°21′37″W	Defiance	

== See also ==
- List of National Historic Landmarks in Ohio
- Listings in neighboring counties: Allen (IN), DeKalb (IN), Henry, Paulding, Putnam, Williams
- National Register of Historic Places listings in Ohio
