= E. O. Fallis =

American architect

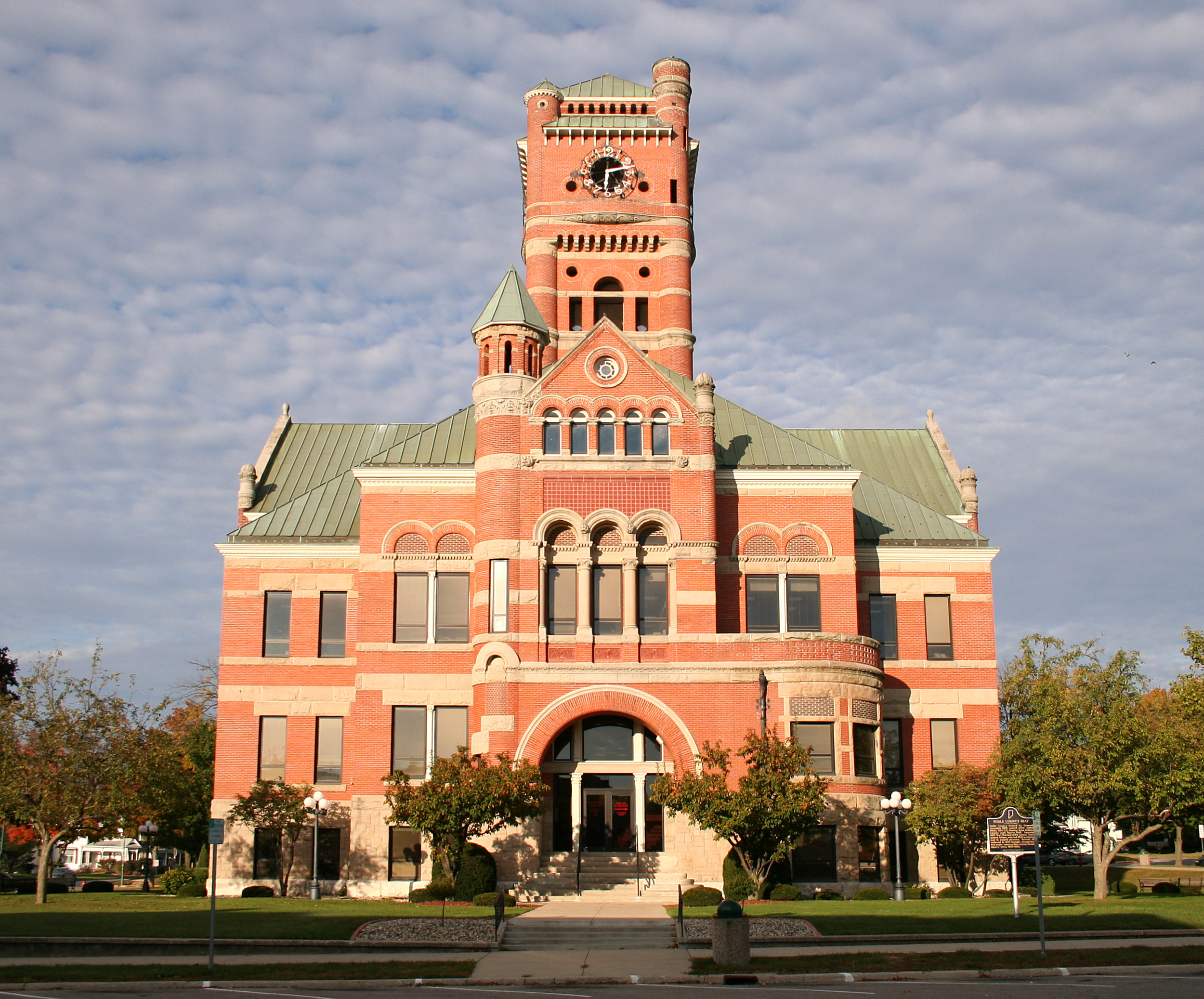
Noble County Courthouse, Albion, Indiana

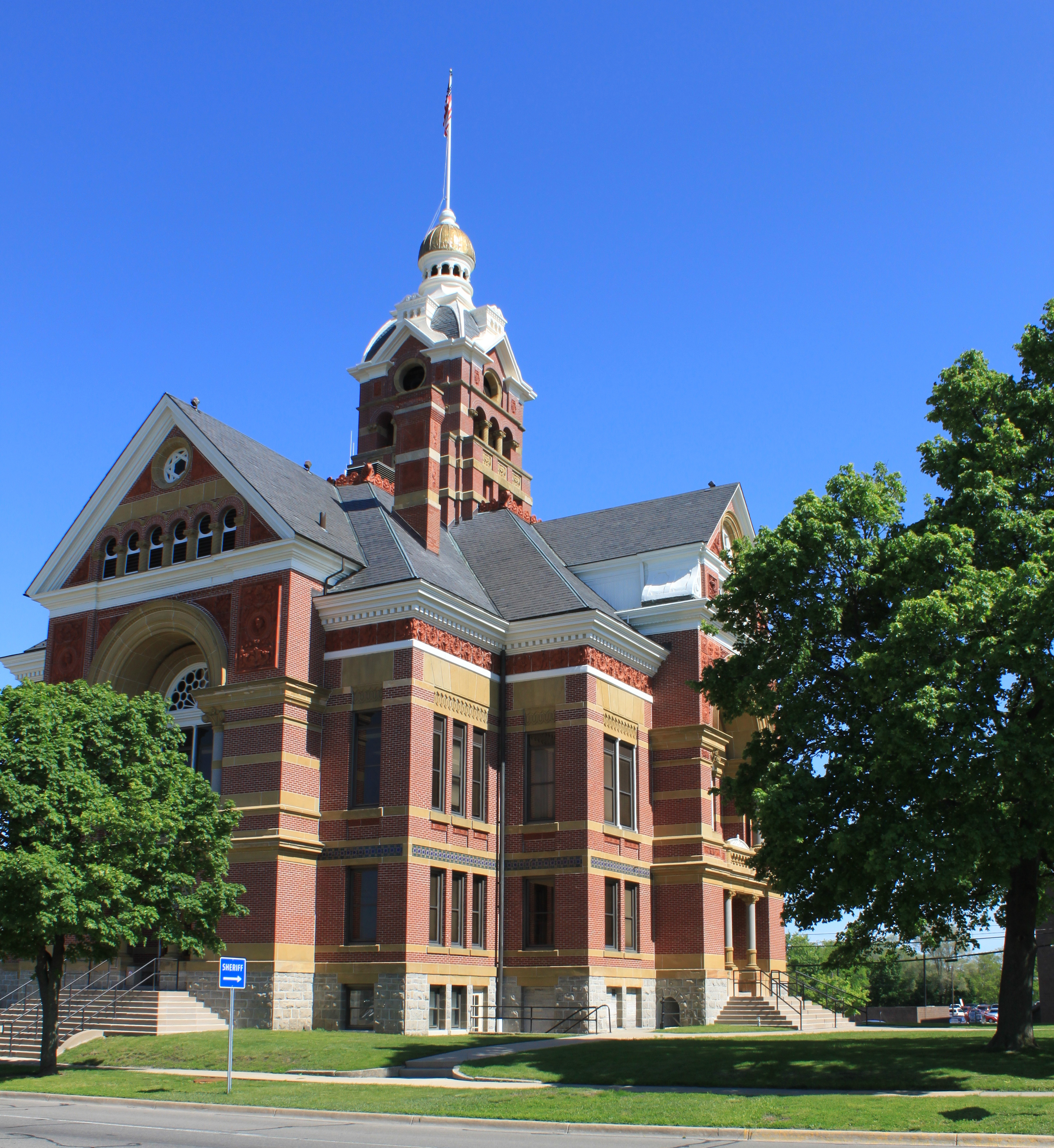
Lenawee County Courthouse

Edward Oscar Fallis, often known as E.O. Fallis, was an American architect of Toledo, Ohio.

A number of his works are listed on the U.S. National Register of Historic Places.

Works include (with attribution):

- First Church of Christ, Scientist, 2704 Monroe St. Toledo, OH (Fallis, E.O.;Yost & Packard), NRHP-listed
- One or more works in Fountain City Historic District, roughly bounded by Butler, Lynn, W. Wilson, Center, Portland and Beech Sts. Bryan, OH (Fallis, E.O.), NRHP-listed
- Benjamin F. Kerr House, 17605 Beaver St. Grand Rapids, OH (Fallis, Edward O.), NRHP-listed
- Lenawee County Courthouse, 309 N. Main St. Adrian, MI (Fallis, Edward O.), NRHP-listed
- Noble County Courthouse, Courthouse Sq. Albion, IN (E. O. Fallis & Co.), NRHP-listed
- Paulding County Courthouse, Courthouse Sq. Paulding, OH (Fallis, E.O. & Co.), NRHP-listed
- Valentine Theater Building, 405-419 Saint Clair and 402-412 Adams Toledo, OH (Fallis, Edward Oscar), NRHP-listed
- Williams County Courthouse, Main and High Sts. Bryan, OH (Fallis, E.O.), NRHP-listed
- Wood County Home and Infirmary, N of Bowling Green at 13660 County Home Rd. Bowling Green, OH (Fallis, E.O.), NRHP-listed
- Nasby Building, Madison Av and Huron St Toledo, Ohio.

== See also ==
- Egyptian Theater, 452 Main St. Delta, CO M.S. Fallis Architect Co.), NRHP-listed
- Sacred Heart Church, 1025 N. Grand Ave. Pueblo, CO Willison & Fallis), NRHP-listed
