= Paulding County Courthouse (Ohio) =

Local government building in the United States

- U.S. National Register of Historic Places
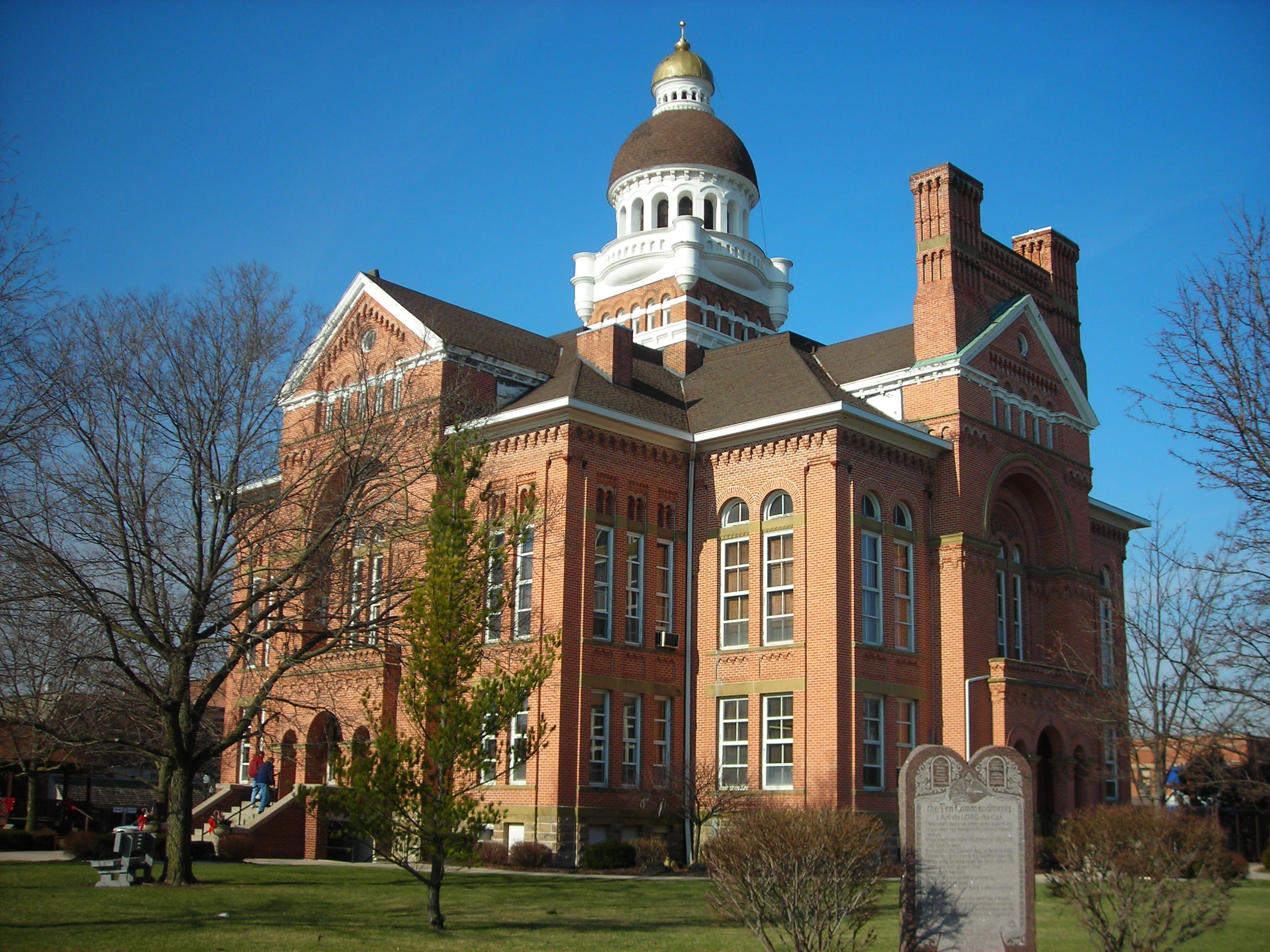
- Southern and eastern sides of the courthouse

- Location within Ohio Location within the United States
- Location: Courthouse Sq., Paulding, Ohio
- Coordinates: 41°8′15″N 84°34′49″W
- Area: 1.5 acres (0.61 ha)
- Built: 1886
- Built by: Rudolph Ehrhart
- Architect: E.O. Fallis & Co.
- Architectural style: Richardsonian Romanesque
- NRHP reference No.: 74001589
- Added to NRHP: May 3, 1974

The Paulding County Courthouse is a historic governmental building in downtown Paulding, Ohio, United States. A Richardsonian Romanesque building erected in 1886, it is the third courthouse to serve the residents of Paulding County.

When Paulding County was established in 1820, the small community of Charloe was named the county seat. This arrangement proved to be short-lived: the community of Paulding grew significantly while Charloe stagnated, and the county seat was eventually moved to the larger village. Once Paulding had been named the county seat, the county's second courthouse was erected on the village's central square in 1837. After approximately fifty years of service, this frame structure was demolished, and the present structure was built on the same location in 1886.

Designed by the E.O. Fallis Company and built by workers under the direction of general contractor Rudolph Ehrhart, the courthouse is a brick structure with a stone foundation and a roof of asphalt. Two-and-one-half stories tall with a central tower, the courthouse features nearly identical entrances on each of its four sides. Measuring 60 feet (18 m) square, and 163 feet (50 m) tall at the tip of its domed tower, the courthouse was patterned after the Lenawee County Courthouse in Michigan, which was also designed by the Fallis architects.

In 1974, the Paulding County Courthouse was listed on the National Register of Historic Places, due to its well-preserved architecture that was deemed significant statewide. It is one of four buildings in Paulding County on the Register, along with a rural round barn, a former train station in the village of Antwerp, and the Carnegie library in Paulding.
