= First Church of Christ, Scientist (Toledo, Ohio) =

Historic church in Ohio, United States

- U.S. National Register of Historic Places
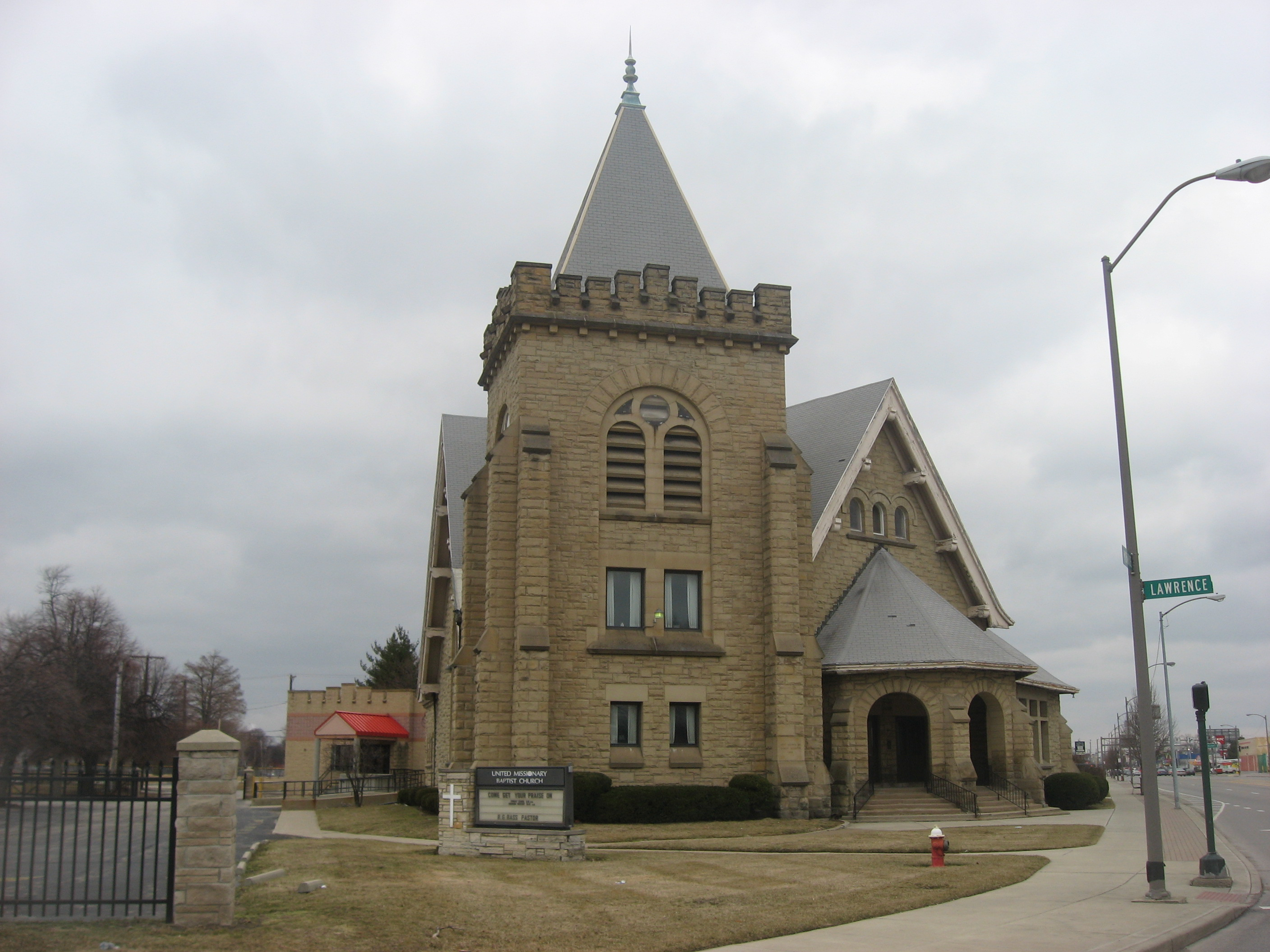
- Original church on Monroe Street
- Interactive map of First Church of Christ, Scientist
- Location: 2704 Monroe Street Toledo, Ohio
- Coordinates: 41°39′42″N 83°33′56″W
- Built: 1898
- Architect: Fallis, E.O.; Yost & Packard
- Architectural style: Romanesque
- NRHP reference No.: 78002125
- Added to NRHP: November 29, 1978

The former First Church of Christ, Scientist, located at 2704 Monroe Street, in Toledo, Ohio, is an historic building built in 1898. It was added to the National Register of Historic Places in 1978, at which date the building was Universal Community Church. First Church of Christ, Scientist, Toledo, now holds services at 4647 West Central Avenue at Corey Road in Ottawa Hills.

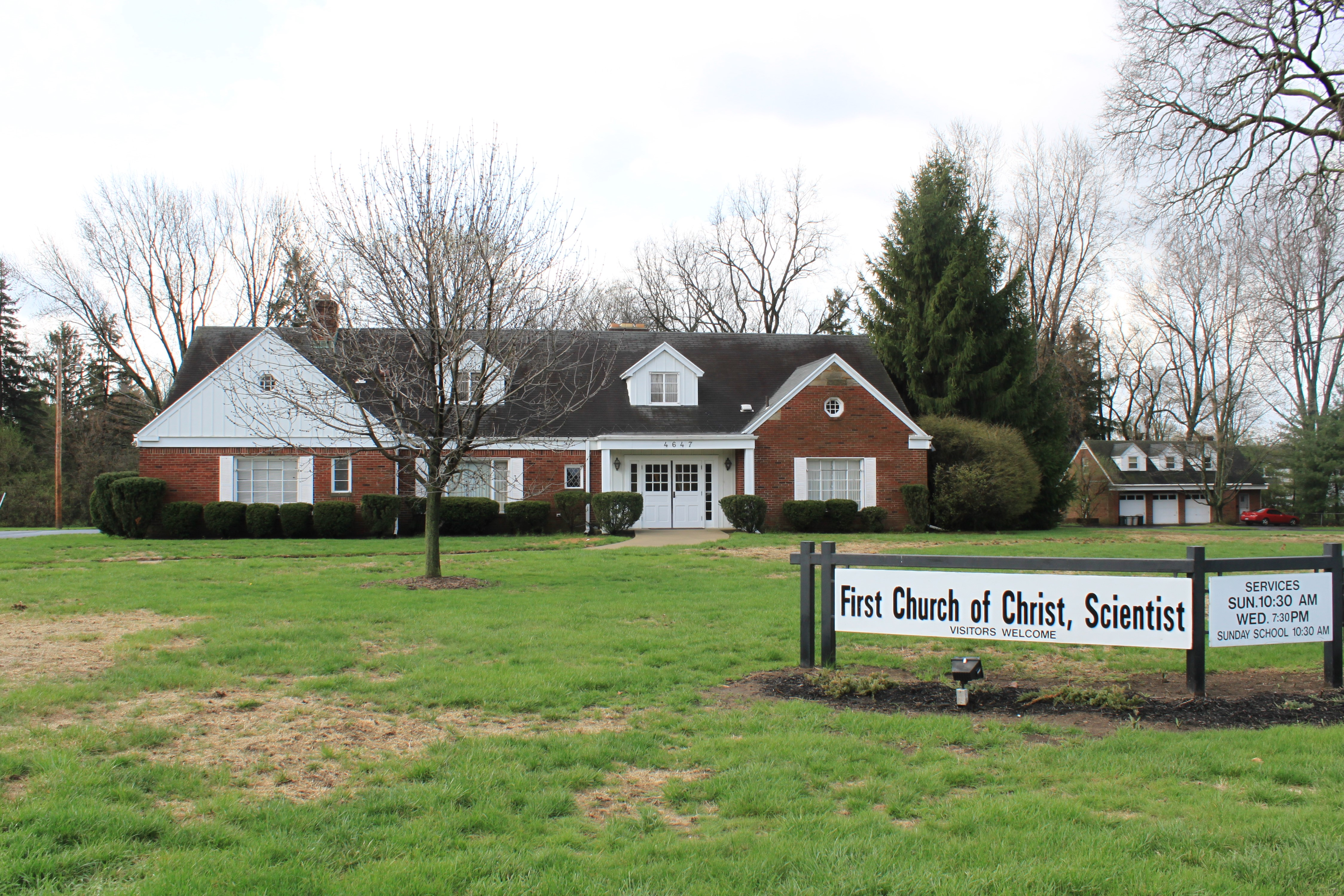
First Church's current location in Ottawa Hills

== See also ==
- List of Registered Historic Places in Ohio
- List of former Christian Science churches, societies and buildings
- First Church of Christ, Scientist (disambiguation)
