= John Edwards House =

Historic house in Ohio, United States

- U.S. National Register of Historic Places
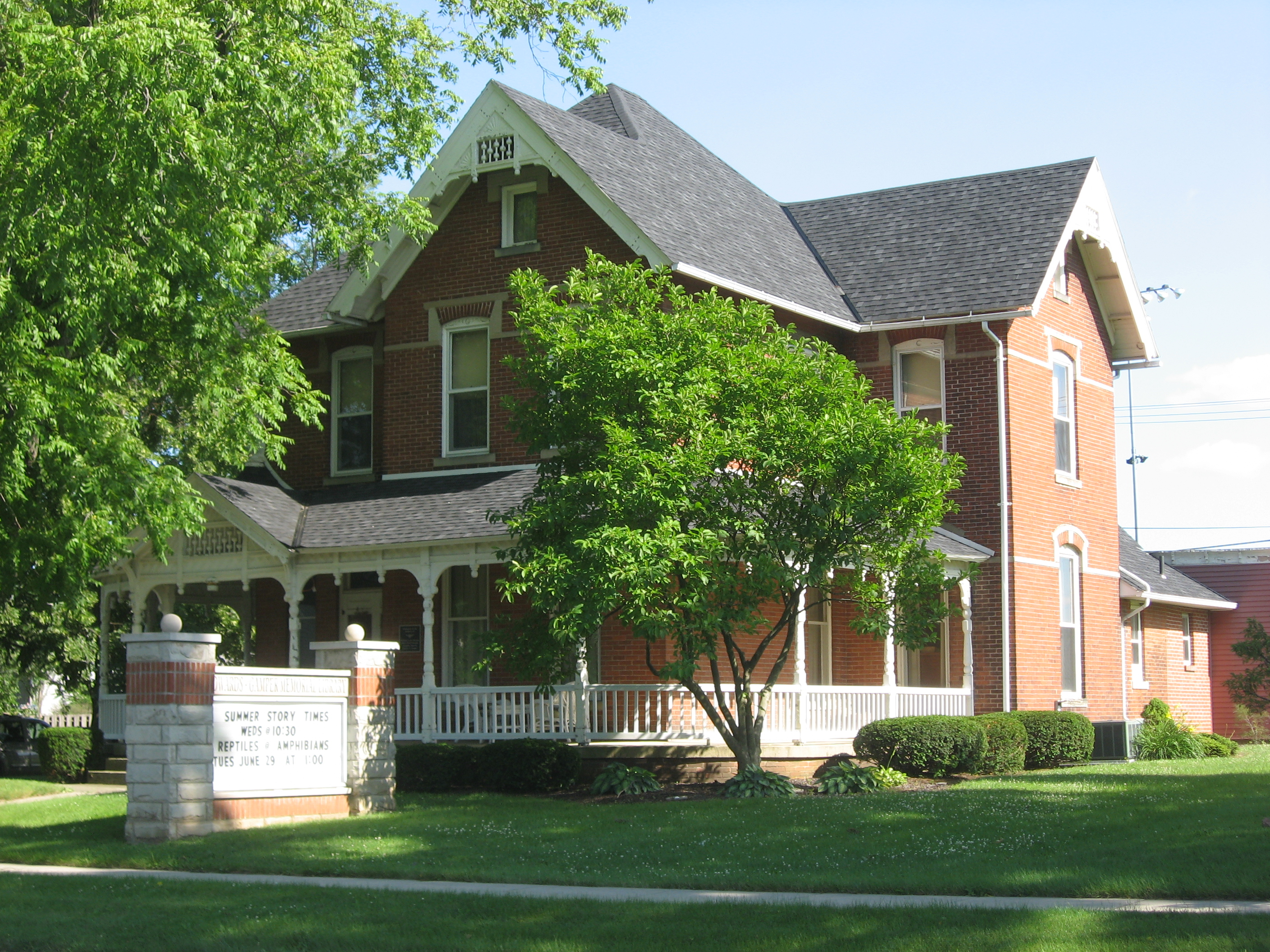
- Front and western side of the house

- Location within Ohio Location within the United States
- Location: 305 W. Main St., Leipsic, Ohio
- Coordinates: 41°6′5″N 83°59′27″W
- Area: less than one acre
- Built: 1894
- Architectural style: Late Victorian
- NRHP reference No.: 78002177
- Added to NRHP: November 27, 1978

The John Edwards House is a historic building in the village of Leipsic in Putnam County, Ohio, United States. Located at 305 W. Main Street, the house is a fine example of Victorian architecture.

In 1861, Thomas and Isabella Edwards began farming a short distance east of Leipsic. As their four sons grew to manhood, they entered local industry in 1886, and their Buckeye Stave Company soon became one of the most prosperous corporations in the rural Black Swamp of northwestern Ohio. By the mid-1890s, the company was one of the largest landowners in Defiance, Henry, and Putnam counties, and the wealth it produced enabled one of the Edwards brothers to build a mansion on Leipsic's west side.

John Edwards paid approximately $21,000 to construct his Leipsic house in 1894. Built with brick walls and a slate roof, this Late Victorian mansion was ornamented with elements such as elaborate stencilling, molds of the heads of lions, and embossed gold.

In 1978, the Edwards House was listed on the National Register of Historic Places because of its well-preserved historic architecture. It is one of two Leipsic places on the Register, along with the former Leipsic Village Hall. One year prior to listing on the Register, the house was purchased by Harriett Gamper, an Edwards descendant, and donated to the village of Leipsic for conversion into a library. Today, the house is the location of the Leipsic Edwards Gamper Memorial Library; it is a part of the Putnam County District Library system.
