= Lenawee County Courthouse =

- U.S. National Register of Historic Places
- Michigan State Historic Site
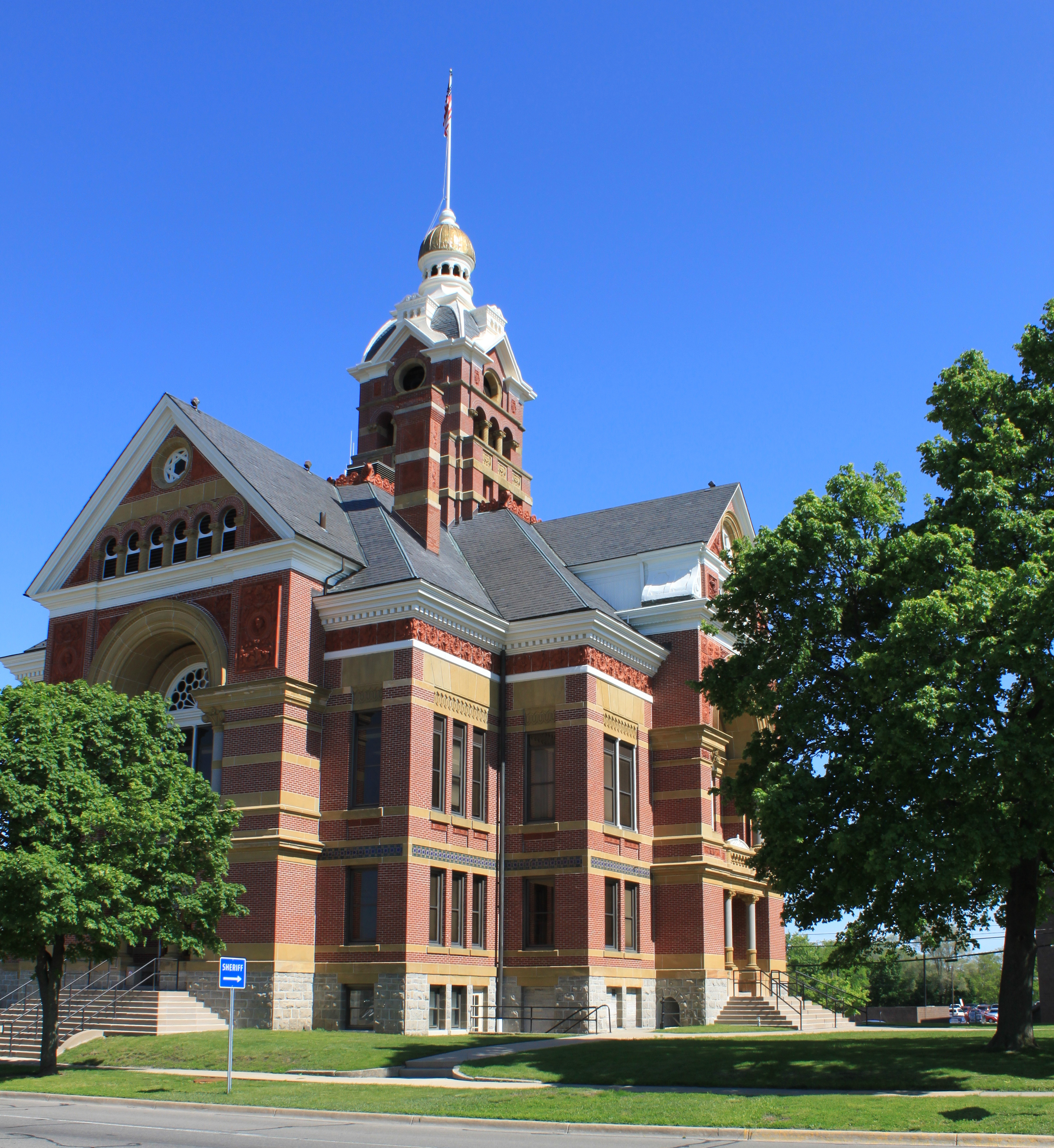

- Location within Michigan Location within the United States
- Interactive map showing the location for Lenawee County Courthouse
- Location: 309 North Main Street; Adrian, Michigan
- Coordinates: 41°54′07″N 84°02′06″W
- Built: 1885
- Architect: Edward Fallis
- Architectural style: Romanesque Revival
- NRHP reference No.: 91000212

Significant dates
- Added to NRHP: February 28, 1991
- Designated MSHS: November 14, 1974

The Lenawee County Courthouse is a county courthouse located at 309 North Main Street (M-52) in the city of Adrian in central Lenawee County, Michigan. It was designated as a Michigan Historic Site on November 14, 1974, and later added to the National Register of Historic Places on February 28, 1991. The Lenawee County Courthouse is located at the corner of M-52 (known locally at this point as North Main Street) and West Front Street. West Front Street also carries the M-52 signage as it turns to form the northern edge of the U.S. Route 223 business loop around the Downtown Adrian Commercial Historic District.

== History ==
When Lenawee County was first organized in 1826, its county seat was the newly established village of Tecumseh. When Tecumseh lost the county seat to Adrian in 1838, a new courthouse was built in Adrian. That courthouse burned down in 1852, and court was held in a series of temporary locations until the funds were raised to build a permanent replacement. However, ballot proposals to raise the funds were several times defeated, until in 1882 the necessary money was finally committed. The new courthouse was designed by Toledo, Ohio native Edward Fallis, who designed many courthouses in several states. In 1884, the county hired Allen & VanTassel of Ionia to construct the building for $47,460. However, costs were overrun, and Allen & VanTassel turned the work over to their bondsmen, Knapp, Avery & Co. Despite some legal wrangling, the courthouse was completed the next year.

Since then, it has served as the seat of the county government. Despite its numerous interior alterations, the courthouse remains one of the most impressive of Michigan's surviving late nineteenth-century courthouses.

== Description ==
The Lenawee County Courthouse was built in the style of Romanesque Revival architecture, and one year after its construction, Fallis used it as a model for his design of Ohio's Paulding County Courthouse. The building measures 134 feet by 108 feet, and has a central tower rising 132 feet above the ground. A main hipped roof is crossed by a secondary hipped roof; the tower rises from the juncture of the gables and is capped with a mansard roof and a domed cupola.

The foundation is of rusticated stone, and rises six feet from the ground. Above the foundation is a beltcourse of Stony Point sandstone, and above that is the main brickwork, formed of red brick with white mortar. The building entryways are gabled with large arches below. The arches contain a double window topped by a semicircular fanlight. The entrance is through a set of carved double doors.

In the interior, the layout is cruciform in shape. The first floor has a floor made of tiles laid in geometric patterns. Two grand staircases lead to the second floor, located on each side of the center hallway.
