= Reservoir war =

1887 minor conflict in Ohio, US

Date	1887
Location	Six Mile Reservoir Paulding County, Ohio
Result	Six Mile Reservoir damaged beyond repair.

Belligerents
Ohio militia; Reservoir guards	Local "Dynamiters"

Casualties and losses
1	None

The Reservoir war was a minor insurrection in Paulding County, Ohio, United States, in 1887.

== Background ==
Just east of Antwerp, Ohio, was the Six Mile Reservoir of the Wabash and Erie Canal. The reservoir, about 2000 acres (8 km^{2}) in size, had been built in 1840 by damming and diking a creek. It was used to provide water for the canal.

The Wabash Canal was completed in 1843 and the Miami and Erie Canal in 1845, but they only operated for about ten years before they started shutting down. The last canalboat on the Wabash canal made its final docking in 1874 in Huntington, Indiana, but other sections shut down years earlier. For instance, the section through Fort Wayne, Indiana, had been sold in 1870, and filled in so the Pennsylvania Railroad could lay tracks.

For twenty years, the reservoir provided little for area residents but a mosquito-breeding ground for the spread of "ague", an archaic term for what was later recognized as malaria. The decaying reservoir also created issues for nearby agriculture and produced a noxious smell. An effort had been made to have the State of Ohio abandon the reservoir, but the bill failed to pass.

== Conflict ==
Local residents attempted to cut the dike and drain the reservoir one night in March 1887, but wet work in cold weather being treacherous, they did an incomplete job. Governor Joseph B. Foraker issued a proclamation requiring the rioters to disperse, and ordered General Axline with several companies of militia to the site to protect the state's property and preserve the peace. When the militia arrived, however, there was nobody there. Residents of the county were in favor of draining the reservoir, and investigators were unable to discover who had damaged the reservoir.

On the night of April 25, 1887, a band of between 200 and 400 men, residents of the county, proceeded to the lower end of the reservoir. They captured the guard and tended to his minor self-inflicted gunshot wounds; nobody else fired a shot. The band dynamited two locks, and spent the entire night cutting the dikes with pick and spade. Although this still did not entirely drain the reservoir, it was permanently damaged. The reservoir and canal were later abandoned by the state.

The only victim of the war was Fred Reeves, aged nineteen, private in Company II. He accidentally shot himself through the head while on guard duty at Cecil an hour or two after the first arrival of the troops at that place. He died instantly and his remains were taken to Toledo the following day for burial, escorted by a corporal and two of his comrades. The citizens and soldiers alike mourned the sad and untimely fate of young Reeves. Fred is buried in Section OC of Forest Cemetery in Toledo, Ohio; see Find A-Grave Memorial #208663218.

== Aftermath ==
The band attacking the reservoir wall carried a flag bearing the slogan: "No Compromise!" Paulding County, Ohio, still uses this motto as of 2021.

A historical marker for the site was dedicated in 2021.
