= Leipsic, Ohio =

- Village
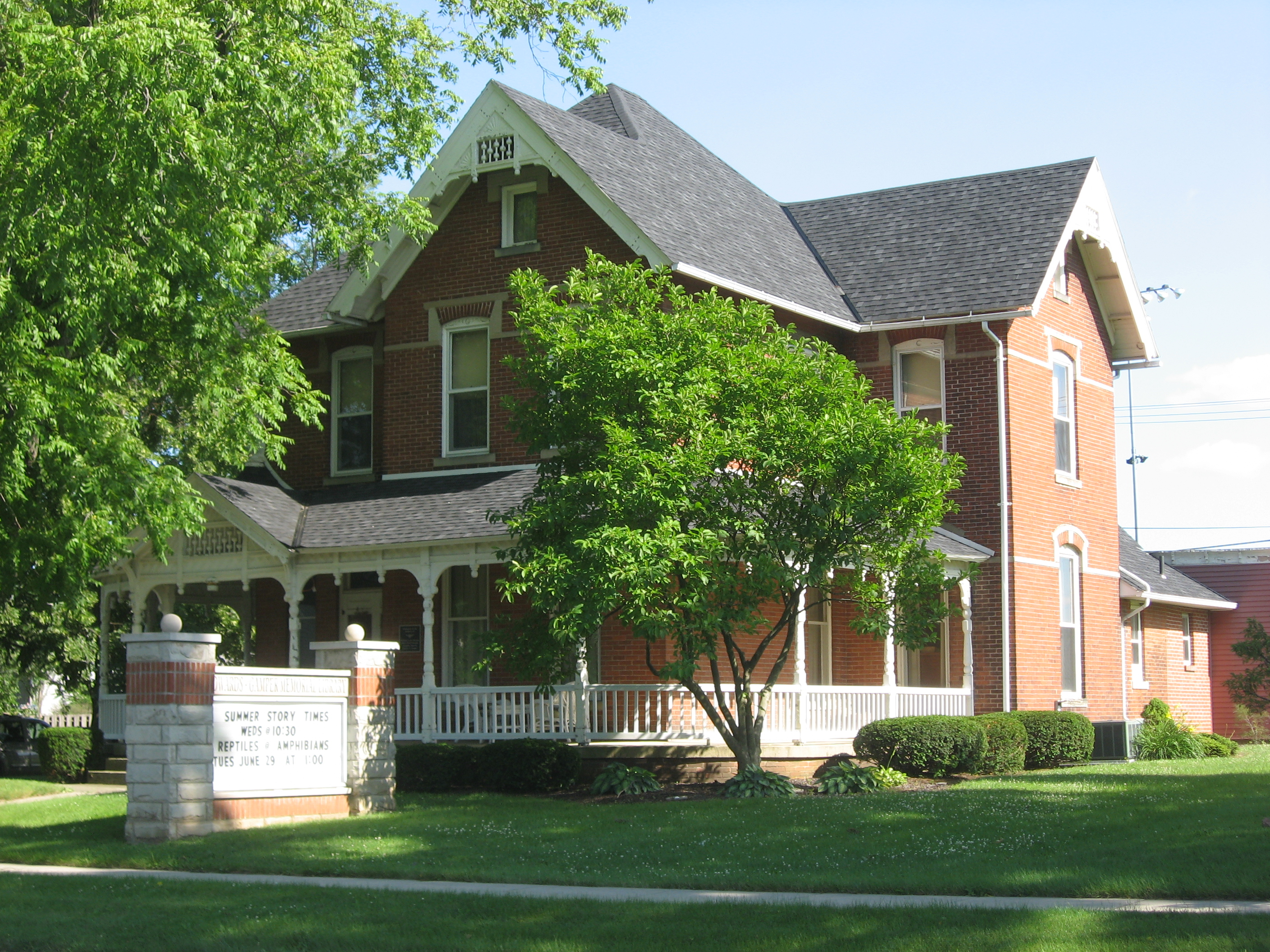
- Village public library
- Motto: "Seeds of Growth Are Sown Here"
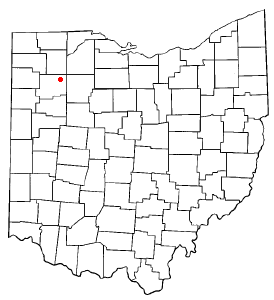
- Location of Leipsic, Ohio
- Coordinates: 41°06′50″N 83°57′45″W
- Country: United States
- State: Ohio
- County: Putnam

Area
  - Total: 3.69 sq mi (9.57 km^{2})
  - Land: 3.68 sq mi (9.54 km^{2})
  - Water: 0.012 sq mi (0.03 km^{2})
- Elevation: 748 ft (228 m)

Population (2020)
  - Total: 2,177
  - Density: 590.9/sq mi (228.15/km^{2})
- Time zone: UTC-5 (Eastern (EST))
  - Summer (DST): UTC-4 (EDT)
- ZIP codes: 45815, 45856
- Area code: 419
- FIPS code: 39-42602
- GNIS feature ID: 2398415
- Website: http://www.villageofleipsic.com/

Leipsic (/ˈlɪpsɪk/ LIP-sick) is a village in Putnam County, Ohio, United States. The population was 2,177 at the 2020 census.

== History ==
Leipsic was platted in 1857. The name is a variant spelling of Leipzig, one of the largest cities in eastern Germany.

Two buildings in Leipsic are listed on the National Register of Historic Places: the old village hall and the John Edwards House.

== Geography ==
According to the United States Census Bureau, the village has a total area of 3.66 square miles (9.48 km^{2}), of which 3.65 square miles (9.45 km^{2}) is land and 0.01 square miles (0.03 km^{2}) is water.

== Demographics ==
Historical population
Census	Pop.	Note	%±
1880	681		—
1890	1,353		98.7%
1900	1,726		27.6%
1910	1,773		2.7%
1920	1,788		0.8%
1930	1,571		−12.1%
1940	1,525		−2.9%
1950	1,706		11.9%
1960	1,802		5.6%
1970	2,072		15.0%
1980	2,171		4.8%
1990	2,203		1.5%
2000	2,236		1.5%
2010	2,093		−6.4%
2020	2,177		4.0%
U.S. Decennial Census

=== 2010 census ===
As of the census of 2010, there were 2,093 people, 801 households, and 513 families living in the village. The population density was 573.4 inhabitants per square mile (221.4/km^{2}). There were 905 housing units at an average density of 247.9 per square mile (95.7/km^{2}). The racial makeup of the village was 77.8% White, 0.2% African American, 0.6% Native American, 0.4% Asian, 18.1% from other races, and 2.9% from two or more races. Hispanic or Latino of any race were 31.3% of the population.

There were 801 households, of which 34.6% had children under the age of 18 living with them, 44.7% were married couples living together, 14.1% had a female householder with no husband present, 5.2% had a male householder with no wife present, and 36.0% were non-families. 31.6% of all households were made up of individuals, and 17.4% had someone living alone who was 65 years of age or older. The average household size was 2.58 and the average family size was 3.25.

The median age in the village was 37 years. 27.9% of residents were under the age of 18; 8.1% were between the ages of 18 and 24; 24% were from 25 to 44; 23.8% were from 45 to 64; and 16.1% were 65 years of age or older. The gender makeup of the village was 47.6% male and 52.4% female.

=== 2000 census ===
As of the census of 2000, there were 2,236 people, 819 households, and 559 families living in the village. The population density was 693.4 inhabitants per square mile (267.7/km^{2}). There were 878 housing units at an average density of 272.3 per square mile (105.1/km^{2}). The racial makeup of the village was 80.64% White, 0.40% African American, 0.40% Native American, 0.36% Asian, 15.65% from other races, and 2.55% from two or more races. Hispanic or Latino of any race were 23.93% of the population.

There were 819 households, out of which 34.4% had children under the age of 18 living with them, 51.6% were married couples living together, 12.0% had a female householder with no husband present, and 31.7% were non-families. 28.3% of all households were made up of individuals, and 16.4% had someone living alone who was 65 years of age or older. The average household size was 2.60 and the average family size was 3.22.

In the village, the population was spread out, with 27.3% under the age of 18, 8.1% from 18 to 24, 25.2% from 25 to 44, 18.1% from 45 to 64, and 21.3% who were 65 years of age or older. The median age was 38 years. For every 100 females there were 89.2 males. For every 100 females age 18 and over, there were 85.1 males.

The median income for a household in the village was $36,250, and the median income for a family was $42,798. Males had a median income of $31,743 versus $20,208 for females. The per capita income for the village was $16,029. About 5.6% of families and 14.7% of the population were below the poverty line, including 22.0% of those under age 18 and 21.8% of those age 65 or over.

== Education ==
Leipsic Local Schools is the school district including Leipsic. It includes an elementary school and Leipsic High School.

Leipsic is also home to St. Mary's Catholic School, located at 129 St. Marys Street. Offering education from grades K-8.

Leipsic has a public library, a branch of the Putnam County District Library.

== Notable people ==
- Karl Joseph Alter, a Roman Catholic Bishop of Cincinnati
- James Cloyd Bowman, Newbery Honor winner
- Charles N. Haskell, former Oklahoma governor
- Charles Makley, bank robber
- Harry Pierpont, bank robber
- Rich Reese, MLB player
