= Charloe, Ohio =

Unincorporated community in Ohio, U.S.

Coordinates: 41°07′53″N 84°26′02″W

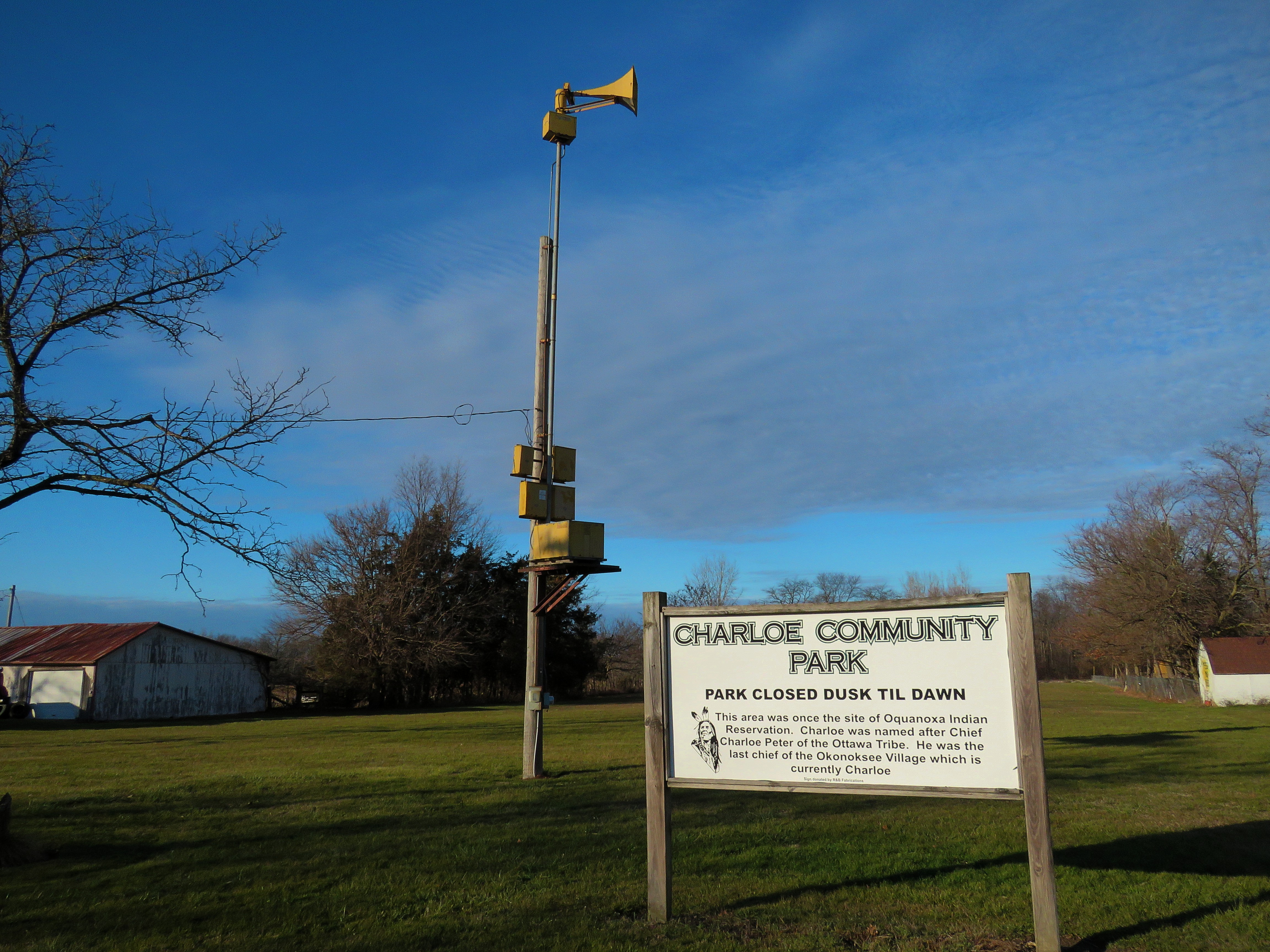
The Charloe Community Park sign and the town's tornado siren behind it

Charloe is an unincorporated community in Paulding County, Ohio.

== History ==
An Ottawa Indian village stood at the site of Charloe, and the community was named for Charloe Peter, an Indian chief.

Charloe was the county seat of Paulding County in the 1840s, but lost its county seat status to Paulding in 1851, prompting the former community's decline.

A post office was also established at Charloe in 1840, and remained in operation until it was discontinued in 1905.

On May 12, 2023, a fire started at Charloe Store at around 10:30 p.m. local time and heavily damaged the store. The store has since been closed, and is planned to be rebuilt and reopened.
