= Marsh Foundation School =

Historic school in Ohio, United States

- George H. Marsh Homestead and the Marsh Foundation School
- U.S. National Register of Historic Places
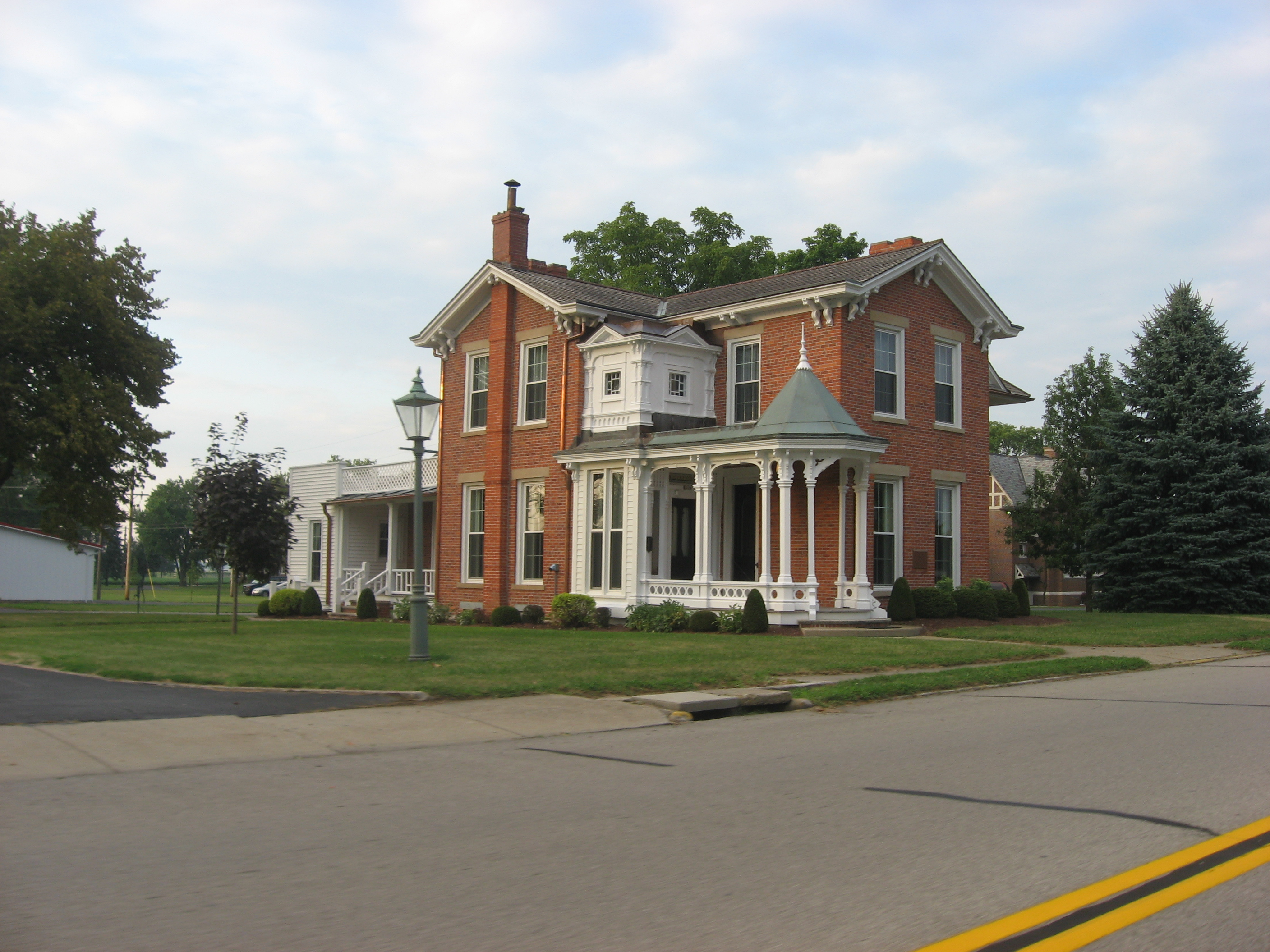
- Front of Marsh's house

- Location within Ohio Location within the United States
- Location: 1229 Lincoln Highway, Van Wert, Ohio
- Coordinates: 40°52′20″N 84°33′53″W
- Area: 300 acres (120 ha)
- Built: 1861
- Architect: Langdon, Hohly, and Gram
- Architectural style: Tudor Revival, Jacobean Revival
- NRHP reference No.: 80003239
- Added to NRHP: November 28, 1980

The Marsh Foundation School is an alternative school in Van Wert, Ohio, United States. Housed in a complex of historic buildings along the former Lincoln Highway, the school and an associated children's home were founded to serve impoverished children throughout northwestern Ohio.

Born in 1833, George H. Marsh settled in Van Wert at the age of twelve with his father. Growing to adulthood, he erected the present farmhouse in the first half of the 1860s; a two-story brick structure, it is a built in the plan of a cross. As the years passed, Marsh became very wealthy, and he became determined to use his wealth to help others. According to locals, Marsh and his family were returning home from Fort Wayne, Indiana on a winter night and saw two impoverished children, and consequently his wife Hilinda suggested dedicating their estate to children such as those two.

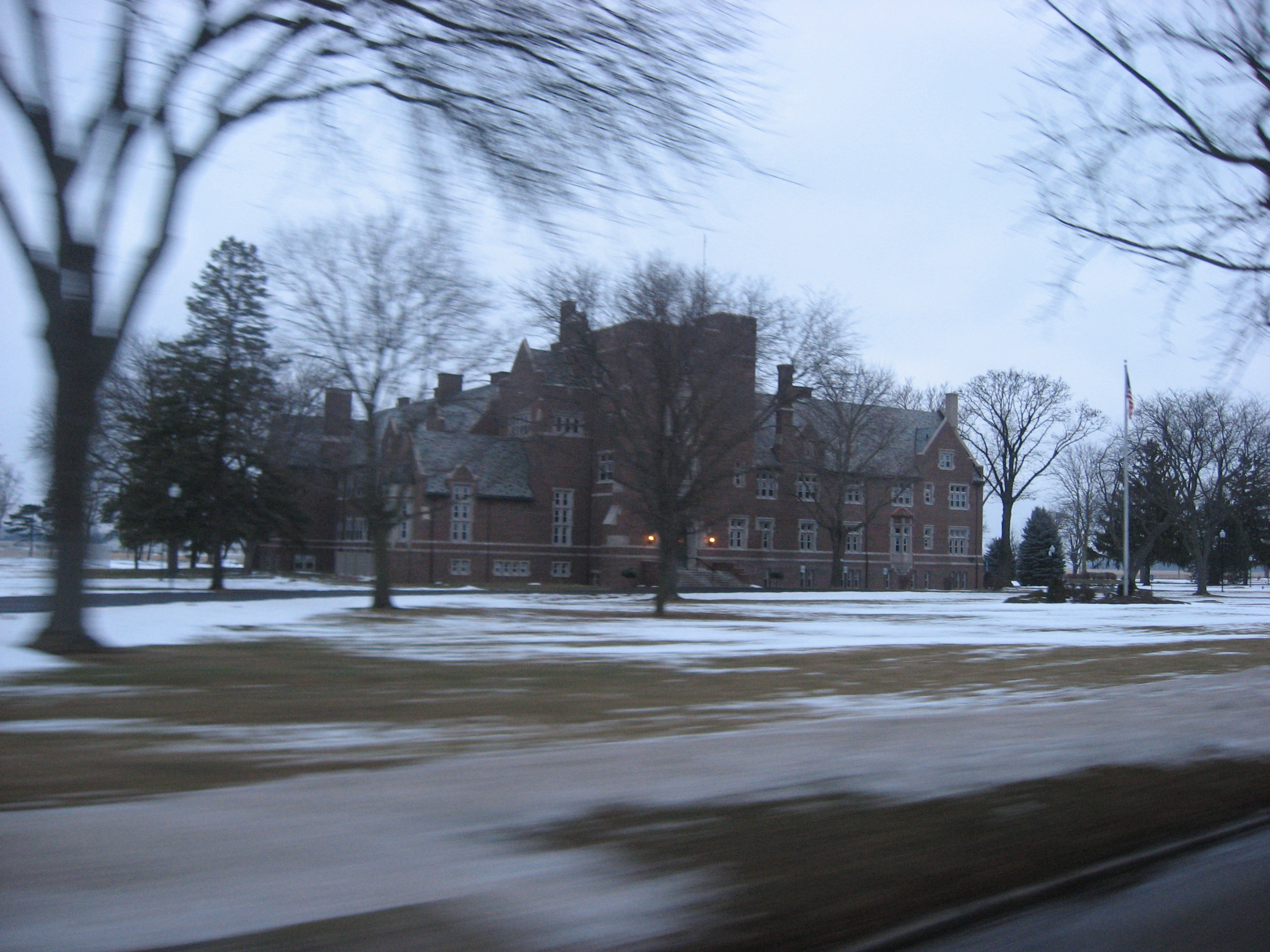
One of the school buildings

After Marsh's death, his will provided more than $5,000,000 for the establishment of a foundation to administer the school. In 1923, the trustees contracted with Langdon, Hohly, and Gram, a Toledo architectural company, to build six school buildings on the Marsh farm. Since that time, the school and home have served the community of Van Wert, while the original house has been converted into a museum.

In 1980, the Marsh homestead and school buildings were listed on the National Register of Historic Places; twenty-one buildings across the complex qualified as contributing properties. The property qualified for inclusion on the Register both because of its distinctive architecture and because of its connection to Marsh: he was one of Van Wert's leading citizens, and the school buildings are among the best Jacobethan structures in western Ohio.
