= Van Wert Bandstand =

- U.S. National Register of Historic Places
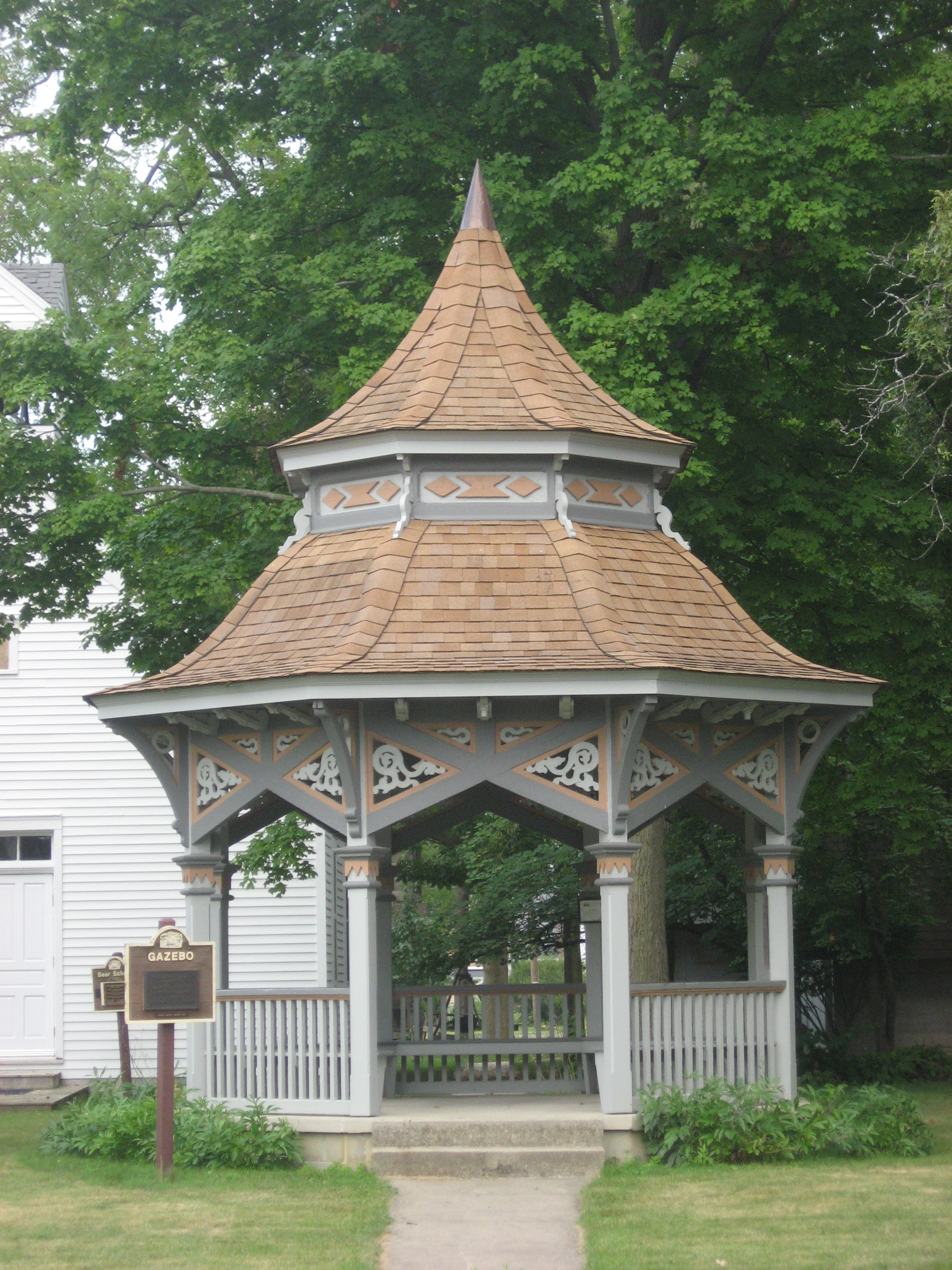
- Front of the bandstand

- Location within Ohio Location within the United States
- Location: On the grounds of the Van Wert County Historical Museum, 602 N. Washington St., Van Wert, Ohio
- Coordinates: 40°52′33.5″N 84°34′58.1″W
- Area: Less than 1 acre (0.40 ha)
- Built: 1874
- Architectural style: Gothic Revival
- NRHP reference No.: 82001493
- Added to NRHP: October 14, 1982

The Van Wert Bandstand is a historic gazebo in Van Wert, a city in the far western portion of the U.S. state of Ohio. Built in 1874, this octagonal bandstand is a wooden structure crafted in the High Gothic Revival style. Among its most distinctive elements is its two-part roof: rising to a central point, the steep roof is split between upper and lower portions by a double cornice with an ornate frieze. Elaborate design continues down below the roof: the eaves underneath the roof's base rest upon carven brackets, which are secured to pillars whose capitals are trimmed with a sawtooth pattern. Finally, the entire roof is supported by a cross-shaped structure that features elements such as three musical notes.

Besides its unusual design, the bandstand is significant for its place in local history. In the 1870s, such structures fulfilled the role of the third place in many communities such as Van Wert: they hosted political rallies, served as community bulletin boards, and became the starting points for citywide parades and musical events. Because of its role in the community, the bandstand has been relocated multiple times: it was built on the lawn of the county courthouse, moved to a local park in 1880, and was again moved to the Van Wert County Fairgrounds in 1906. After more than seventy years at the fairgrounds, the bandstand was listed on the National Register of Historic Places in 1982, both because of its distinctive architecture and because of its place in local history. It has not remained in this location — ten years after its addition to the Register, the bandstand was again moved; this time, it was placed on the grounds of the Van Wert County Historical Society Museum, where it remains today. Although structures that have been moved from their original locations are generally not eligible for inclusion on the National Register, an exception was made for the Van Wert Bandstand: its architecture and craftmanship have been exceptionally well preserved, and it is the only historic bandstand still in existence in rural western Ohio.
