= Round Barn (Paulding, Ohio) =

- U.S. National Register of Historic Places
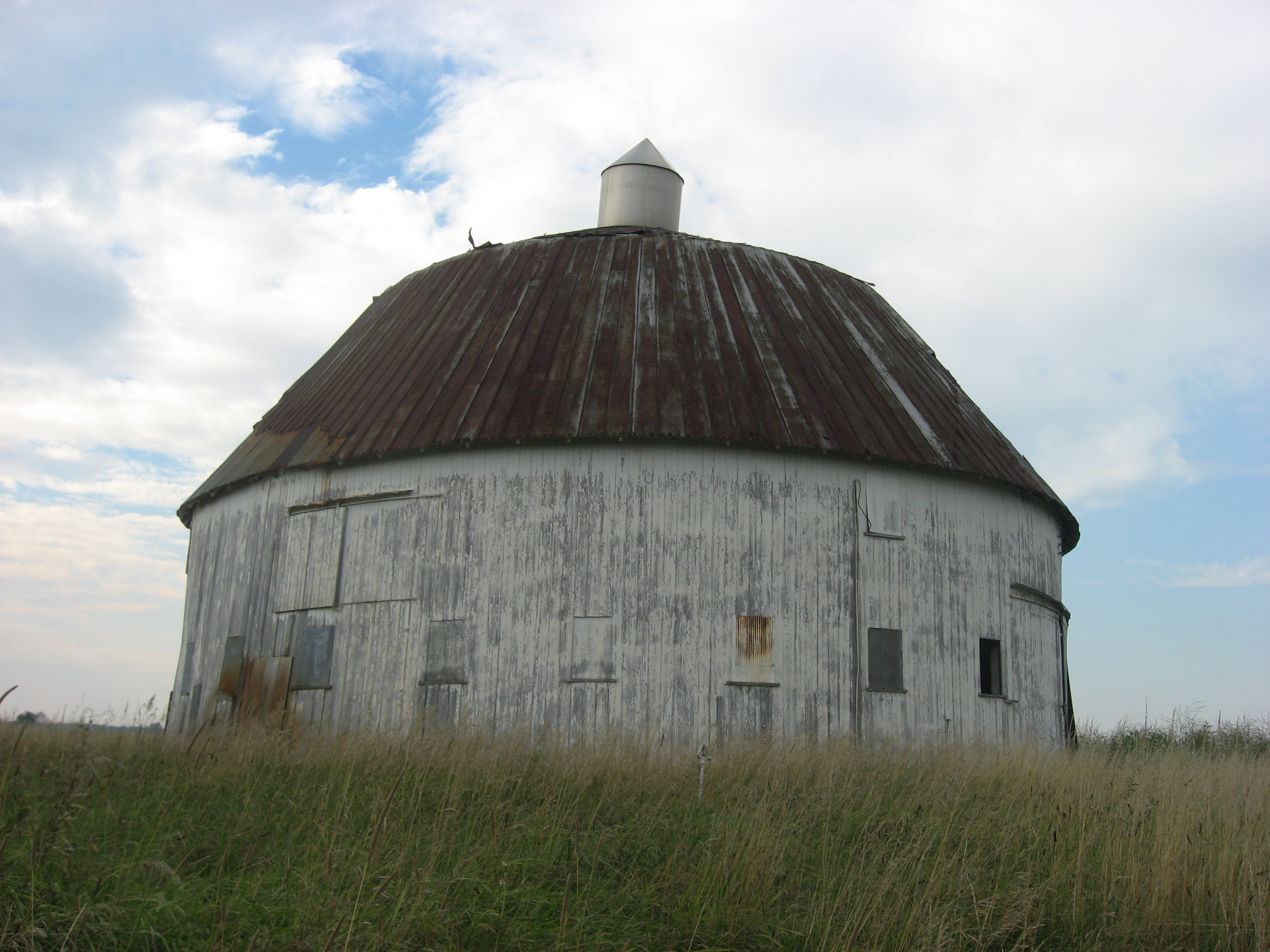

- Location within Ohio Location within the United States
- Location: North side of Township Road 168 northeast of Paulding in Emerald Township, Paulding County, Ohio
- Nearest city: Paulding, Ohio
- Coordinates: 41°10′8″N 84°31′37″W
- Area: less than one acre
- Built: 1911
- Architectural style: Round Barn
- MPS: Round Barns in the Black Swamp of Northwest Ohio TR
- NRHP reference No.: 80003206
- Added to NRHP: April 17, 1980

The Round Barn near Paulding, Ohio, listed on the U.S. National Register of Historic Places simply as Round Barn, is in the area of Paulding, Ohio. It is a round barn that was built in 1911. It may also have been known as William Sinn Round Barn.

It was owned originally or at some later date by Ohio Wesleyan University. It is a 60-foot (18 m) diameter barn, which rises to a height of 55 feet (17 m). It was one of six round barns in the Black Swamp area of northwest Ohio that were nominated for NRHP listing together. The listed area for this one, as for several of the others, was just the area of the barn itself plus 50 feet extended out, so making a 160-foot (49 m) diameter circular area.

The barn was listed on the National Register of Historic Places in 1980. Unfortunately, this barn is no longer standing.

William Sinn was one of the trustees of the barn property.

== See also ==
- List of round barns
