= Brooke Site =

Historical site in Defiance, Ohio, United States

- U.S. National Register of Historic Places
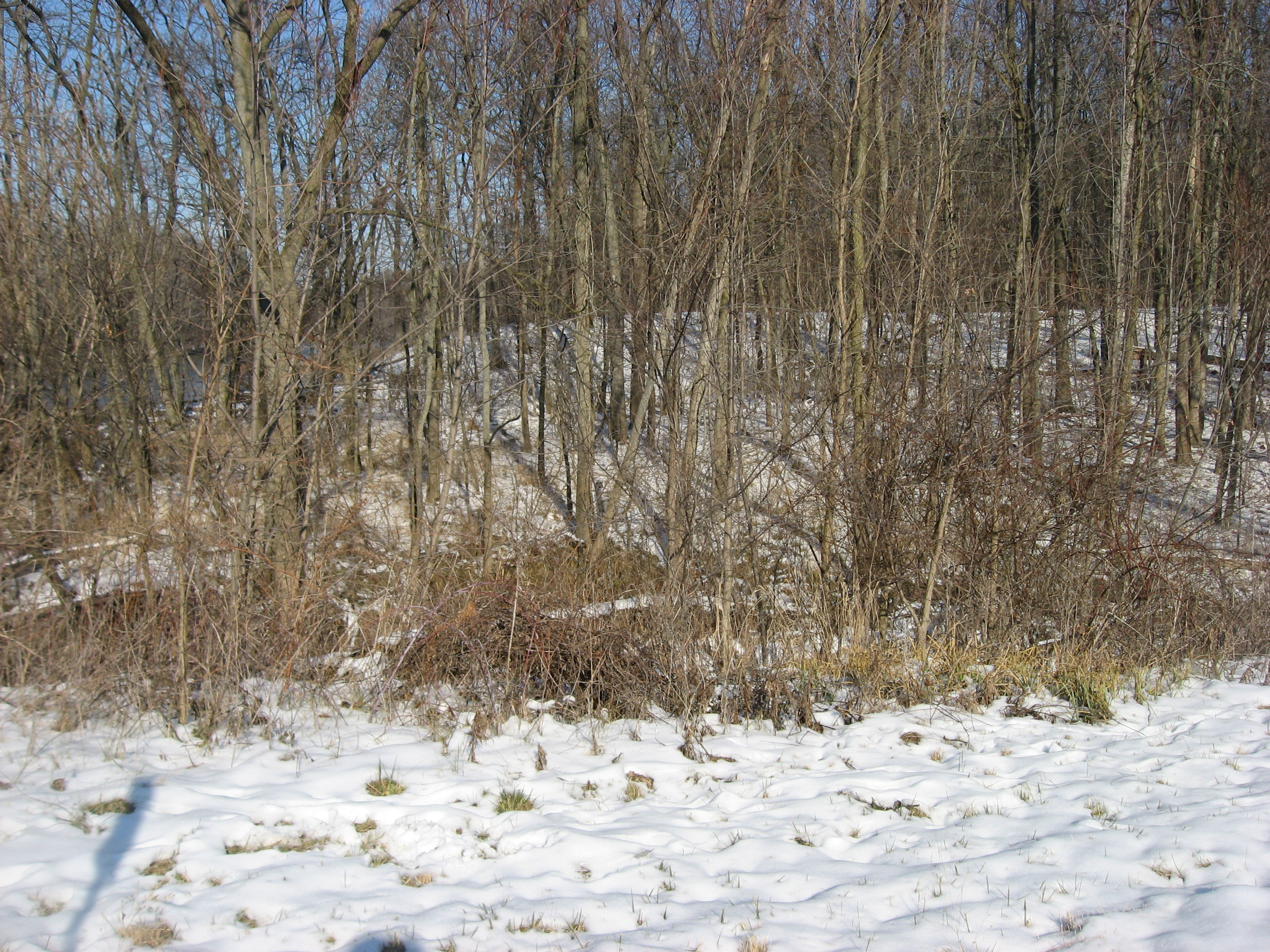
- Looking into the ravine in the site's eastern portion

- Location within Ohio Location within the United States
- Location: Between Watson Rd. and the Auglaize River, east of the Ohio Power Dam
- Nearest city: Defiance, Ohio
- Coordinates: 41°14′18″N 84°23′43″W
- Area: 1 acre (0.40 ha)
- NRHP reference No.: 76001412
- Added to NRHP: January 1, 1976

The Brooke Site (designated 33DE3) is an archaeological site in the northwestern portion of the U.S. state of Ohio. Located south of the city of Defiance in Defiance County, the site encompasses approximately 1 acre (0.40 ha) at the bottom of a ravine, along the Auglaize River. It was occupied by Late Woodland peoples of the Ontario and Younge Traditions.

Archaeology students from Defiance College took part in field schools at the site during the summers of 1968 through 1973. Excavations conducted by these field schools resulted in the discovery of a wide range of artifacts, such as bits of flint, bone, and pottery, a midden, fire pits, and a piece of copper. Although only half of the site was excavated by these field schools, the knowledge gained was significant because it highlighted the connection between the different peoples who occupied the site, and because the excavations revealed the inhabitants' varying seasonal uses of the site.

In 1976, the Brooke Site was added to the National Register of Historic Places because of its archaeological significance.
