= Dr. H. Huber Block =

- U.S. National Register of Historic Places
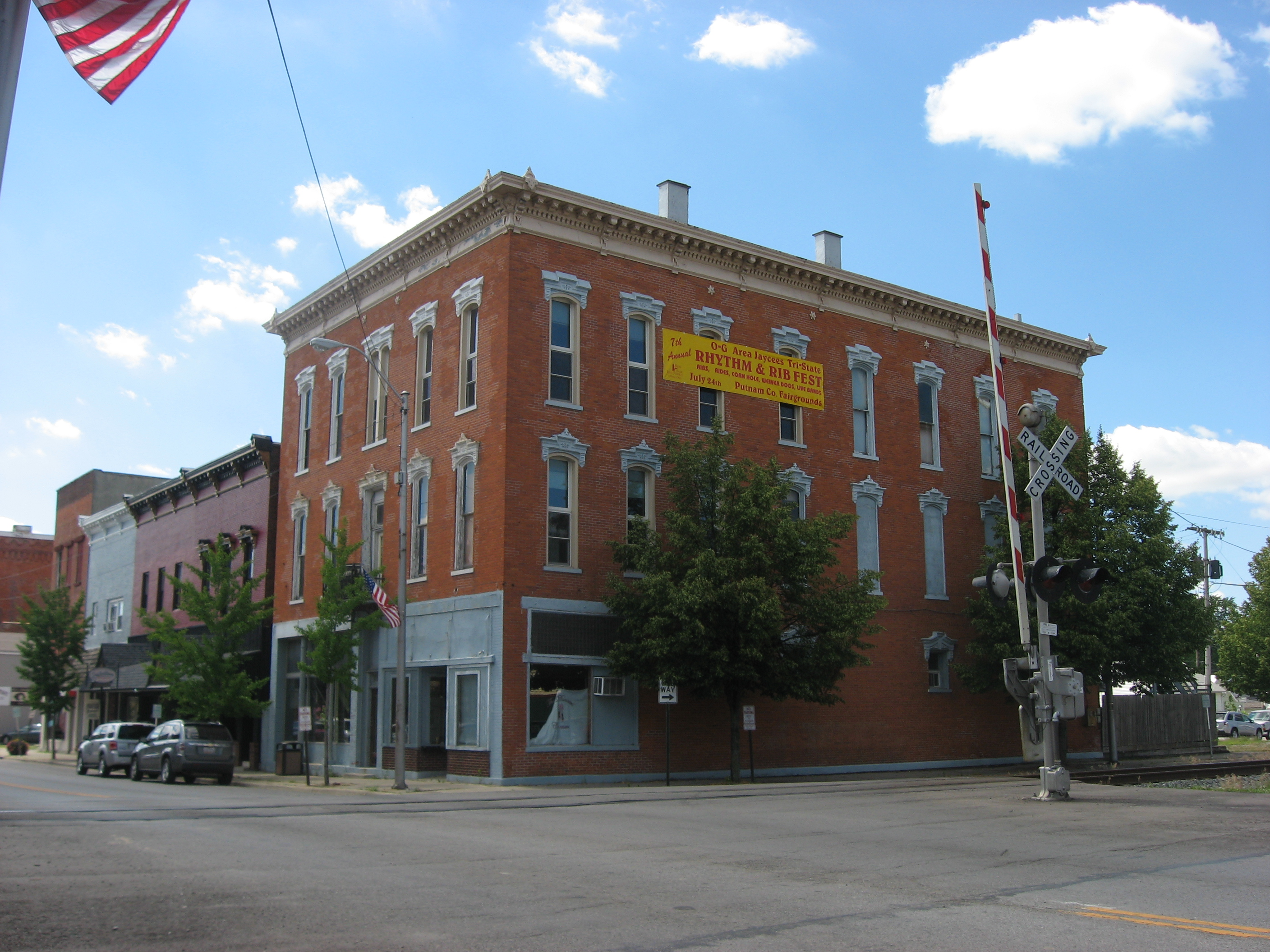
- Front and side of the block

- Location within Ohio Location within the United States
- Location: Main St. and Taft Ave., Ottawa, Ohio
- Coordinates: 41°1′9″N 84°2′54″W
- Area: less than one acre
- Built: 1882 Torn down = 2015
- Architectural style: Italianate
- NRHP reference No.: 80003213
- Added to NRHP: June 4, 1980

The Dr. H. Huber Block was a historic commercial building in downtown Ottawa, Ohio, United States. Built in 1882, it was erected for Dr. Hubert Huber, a native of Germany who immigrated to the nearby village of Glandorf in 1853. This Italianate three-story brick building is typical of many commercial buildings constructed in villages such as Ottawa in the late nineteenth century: as prosperity increased, building owners sought to rebuild their structures in the style of those in large cities. Besides maintaining a medical practice in the building, Huber also operated a pharmacy on the first story that continued in operation long after his death; the second floor consisted of residential apartments that he rented out to others, and the third floor was used for nearly a century as a meeting place for the local Knights of Columbus lodge.

In 1980, the Huber Block was listed on the National Register of Historic Places. It qualified for inclusion because of its well-preserved historic architecture, which was seen as significant in the local community. Building was torn down in 2015 due to the 2007 flood damages.
