= Ottawa Waterworks Building =

- U.S. National Register of Historic Places
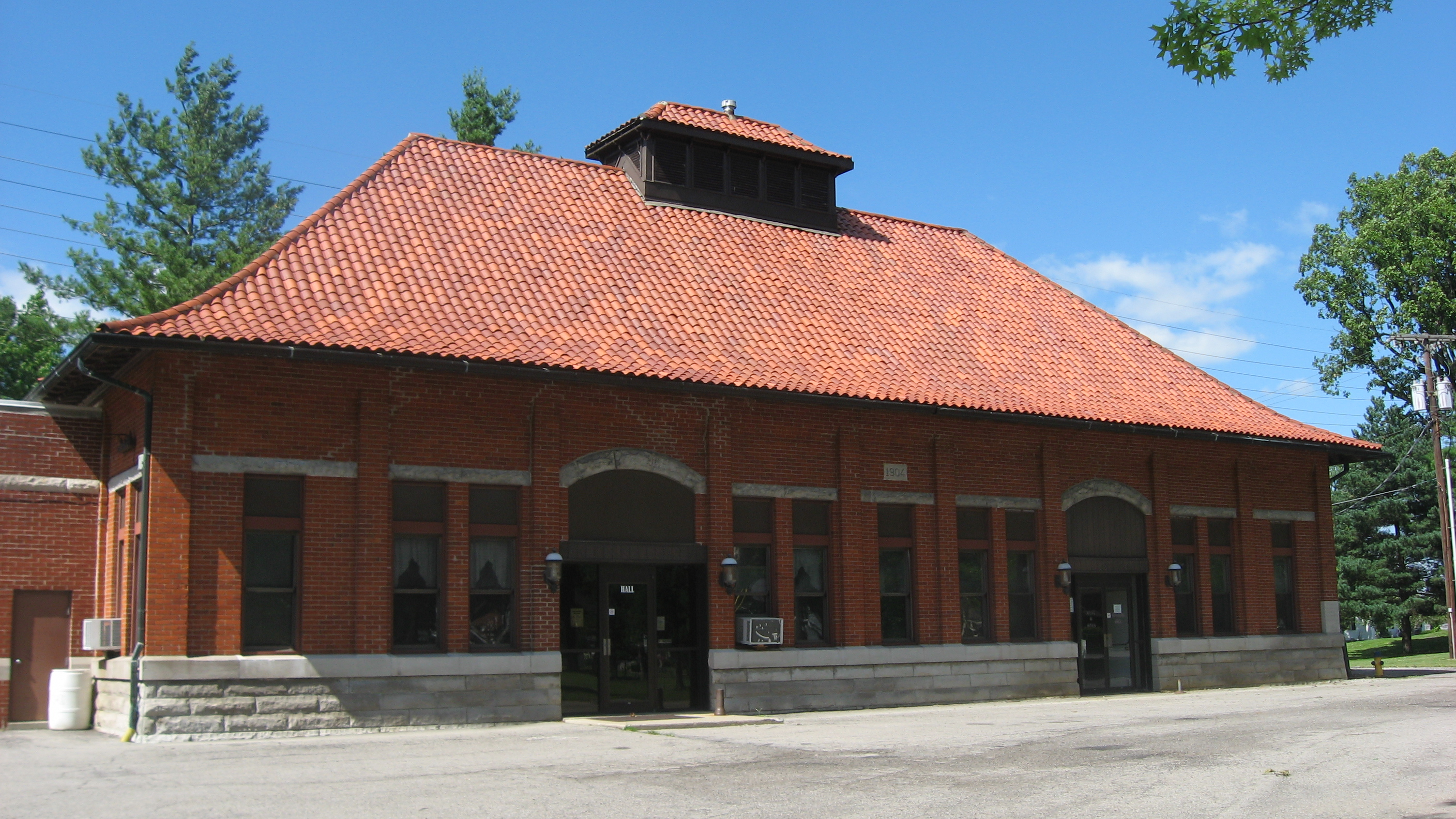
- Front of the waterworks

- Location within Ohio Location within the United States
- Location: 1035 E. 3rd St., Ottawa, Ohio
- Coordinates: 41°1′17″N 84°2′12″W
- Area: 3.5 acres (1.4 ha)
- Built: 1904
- Architect: Board of Public Affairs for the Village of Ottawa
- NRHP reference No.: 76001519
- Added to NRHP: September 13, 1976

The Ottawa Waterworks Building is a historic waterworks in eastern Ottawa, Ohio, United States. Built in 1904, it is Putnam County's oldest water pumping facility; as the first significant water-related public works project in Ottawa, it enabled the creation of a municipal water system in the village. In its earliest years, the waterworks sheltered equipment used to pump water from municipal wells.

A single-story structure, the Ottawa Waterworks Building is a brick structure, nine bays wide, which rests on a stone foundation. Protected by a roof of ceramic tiles, the building is decorated with stone and wooden elements. The Waterworks Building served as Ottawa's primary water pumping facility for approximately seventy years, remaining active until a new waterworks was completed in the mid-1970s. Since that time, it has been used as storage for equipment and spare machinery for the water system.

In 1976, the Ottawa Waterworks Building was listed on the National Register of Historic Places. It qualified for inclusion both because of its architecture and because of its place in local history: it was deemed a fine example of a local public works building, and its role as the area's first water pumping station has made it a leading example of the development of early twentieth-century Putnam County. Today, the Waterworks Building lies in a municipal park.
