= East Side Fire Station =

- U.S. National Register of Historic Places
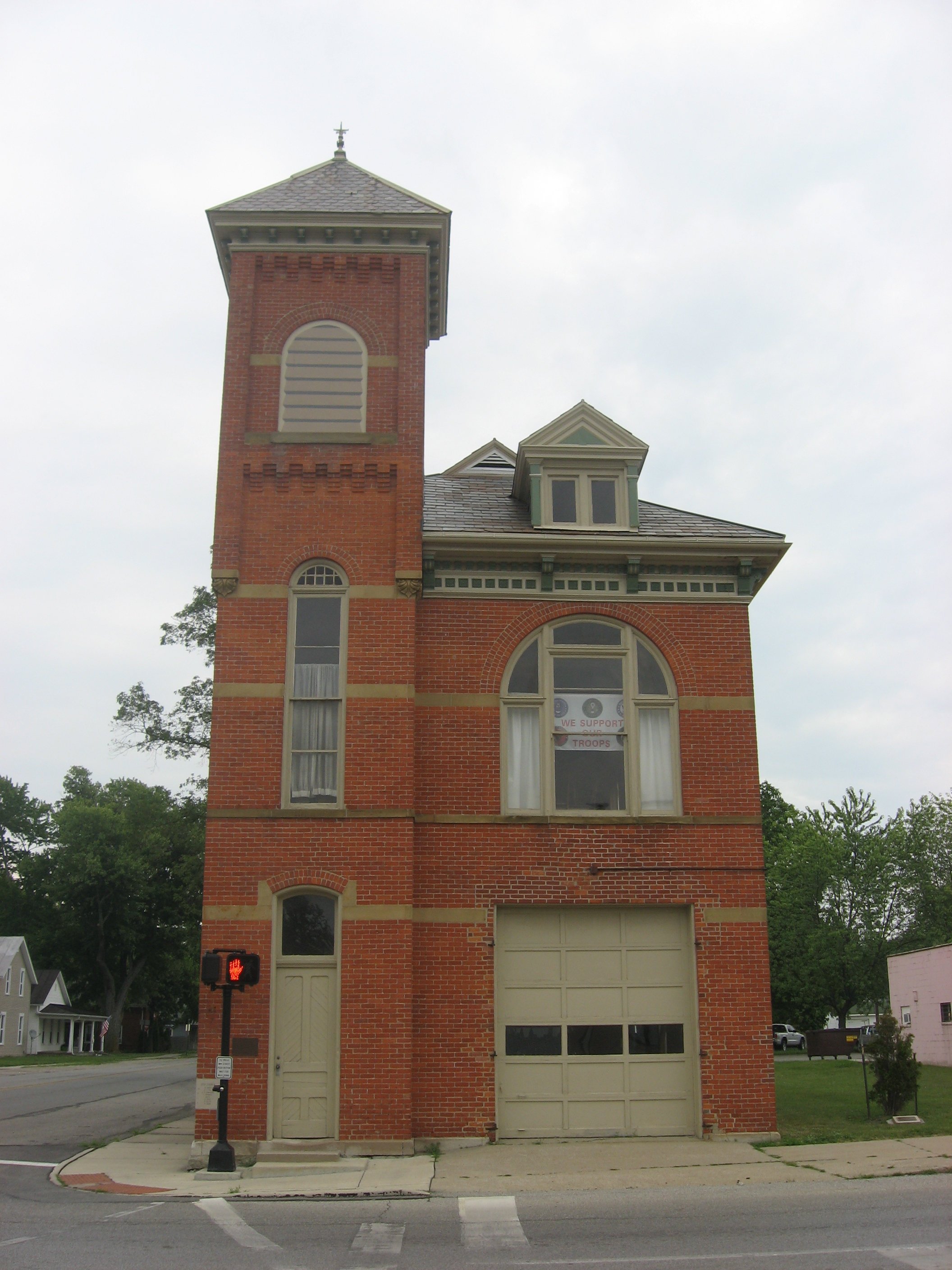

- Location within Ohio
- Interactive map showing the location of East Side Fire Station
- Location: Douglas and Hopkins Sts., Defiance, Ohio
- Coordinates: 41°16′51″N 84°21′05″W
- Area: less than one acre
- Built: 1889
- Built by: Miller, George
- NRHP reference No.: 76001413
- Added to NRHP: December 12, 1976

The East Side Fire Station, at Douglas and Hopkins Sts. in Defiance, Ohio, was built in 1889. It was listed on the National Register of Historic Places in 1976.

It has also been known as Fourth Ward Building and served as a ward voting place. It also served as a police station. It was later a city maintenance building.
