= Antwerp station =

- Antwerp Norfolk and Western Depot
- U.S. National Register of Historic Places
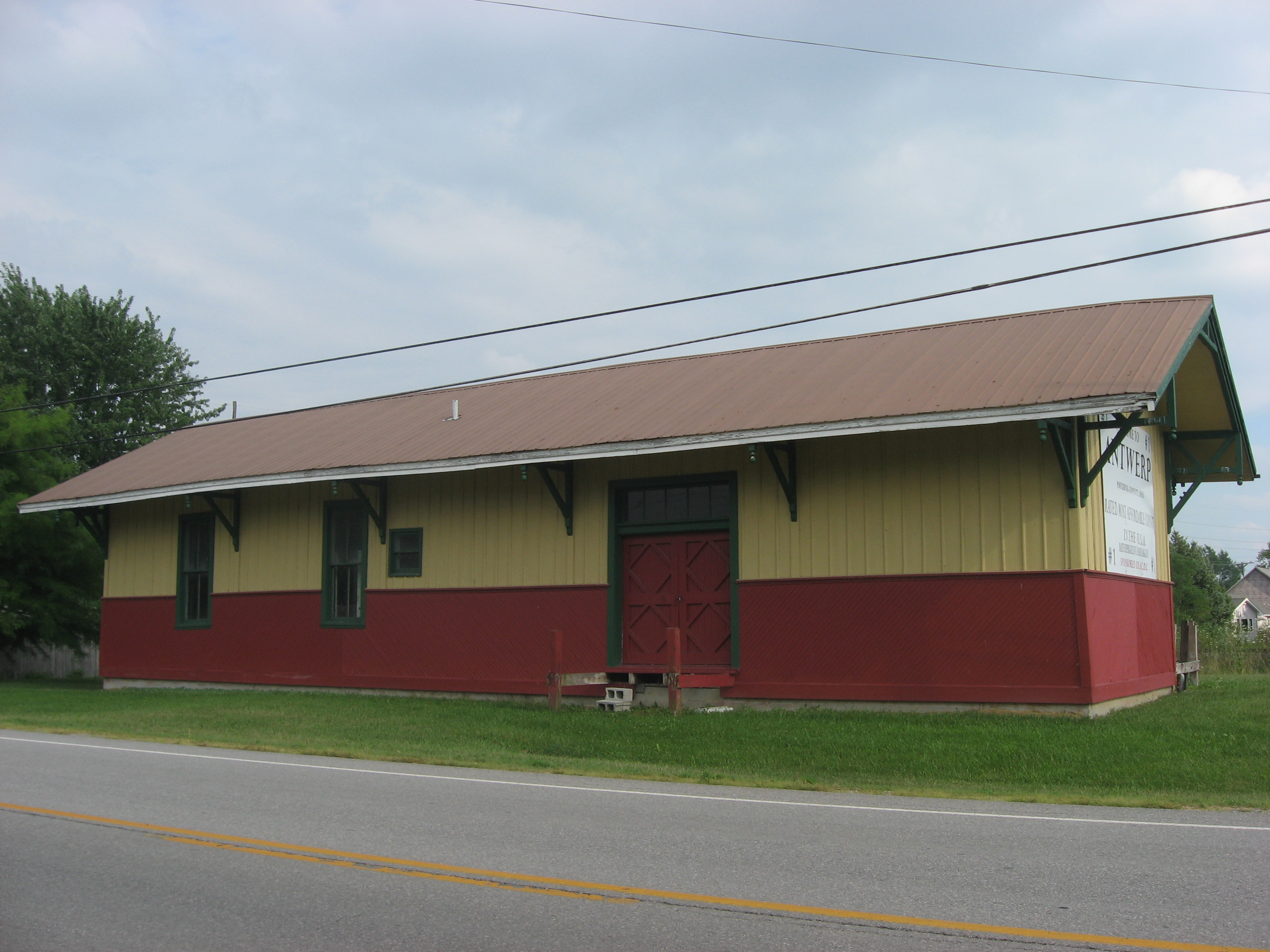
- Front of the depot

- Location within Ohio Location within the United States
- Location: W. River St., Antwerp, Ohio
- Coordinates: 41°10′44″N 84°44′53″W
- Area: less than one acre
- Built: 1880
- Architect: Wabash, St. Louis & Pacific Railroad
- NRHP reference No.: 80003205
- Added to NRHP: September 23, 1980

Antwerp station is a historic former train station in the village of Antwerp in the far western portion of the U.S. state of Ohio. Built in 1880 by the Wabash, St. Louis and Pacific Railway, it is a primarily wooden structure with weatherboarded walls. Its roof features a distinctively large overhang.

When the depot was built, Antwerp was the largest community in Paulding County, due to an active logging industry. Accordingly, the depot was built to be larger than most train stations in small northwestern Ohio communities. Inside, the station is divided into several distinct areas: freight, ordinary passengers, mail and express packaging, and internal railroad offices; each possess their own rooms. Other than its size, the depot is typical of late nineteenth-century train stations in northwestern Ohio, which frequently served as commercial hubs for their communities.

After the station closed in 1976, the Antwerp Historical Society purchased it from the Norfolk and Western Railway; having no use for the station, the railroad asked the society to relocate it, and the depot was moved to its present location, approximately 2,000 feet (610 m) to the west of its original site. Four years later, the depot was listed on the National Register of Historic Places as the Antwerp Norfolk and Western Depot, both because of its distinctive architecture and because of its significance in local history. This designation is unusual, for buildings that have been moved from their original locations are not normally eligible for inclusion on the National Register.

Preceding station	Wabash Railroad	Following station
Woodburn toward Fort Wayne	Fort Wayne – Toledo	Knoxdale toward Toledo
