= Leipsic Village Hall =

- Leipsic City Hall
- U.S. National Register of Historic Places
- Location within Ohio Location within the United States
- Location: Belmore St., Leipsic, Ohio
- Coordinates: 41°5′52.4″N 83°59′6″W
- Area: less than one acre
- Built: 1904
- Architect: Charles Henry & Sons
- NRHP reference No.: 79001928
- Added to NRHP: June 20, 1979

The Leipsic Village Hall was a historic village and township hall in the village of Leipsic in the northwestern part of the U.S. state of Ohio. Built in 1904, the village hall was a large three-story brick building with a corner tower. For a community as small as Leipsic (population 2,236 at the 2000 census), it was a very elaborate building: the tower was crowned with battlements, and corbelling was used to support a significant portion of the roofline. At one time, the building served a wide range of municipal purposes: besides meeting rooms for elected village and township leaders, it contained space for a jail, the fire station, a community center, municipal offices, a library, and the mayor's courtroom.

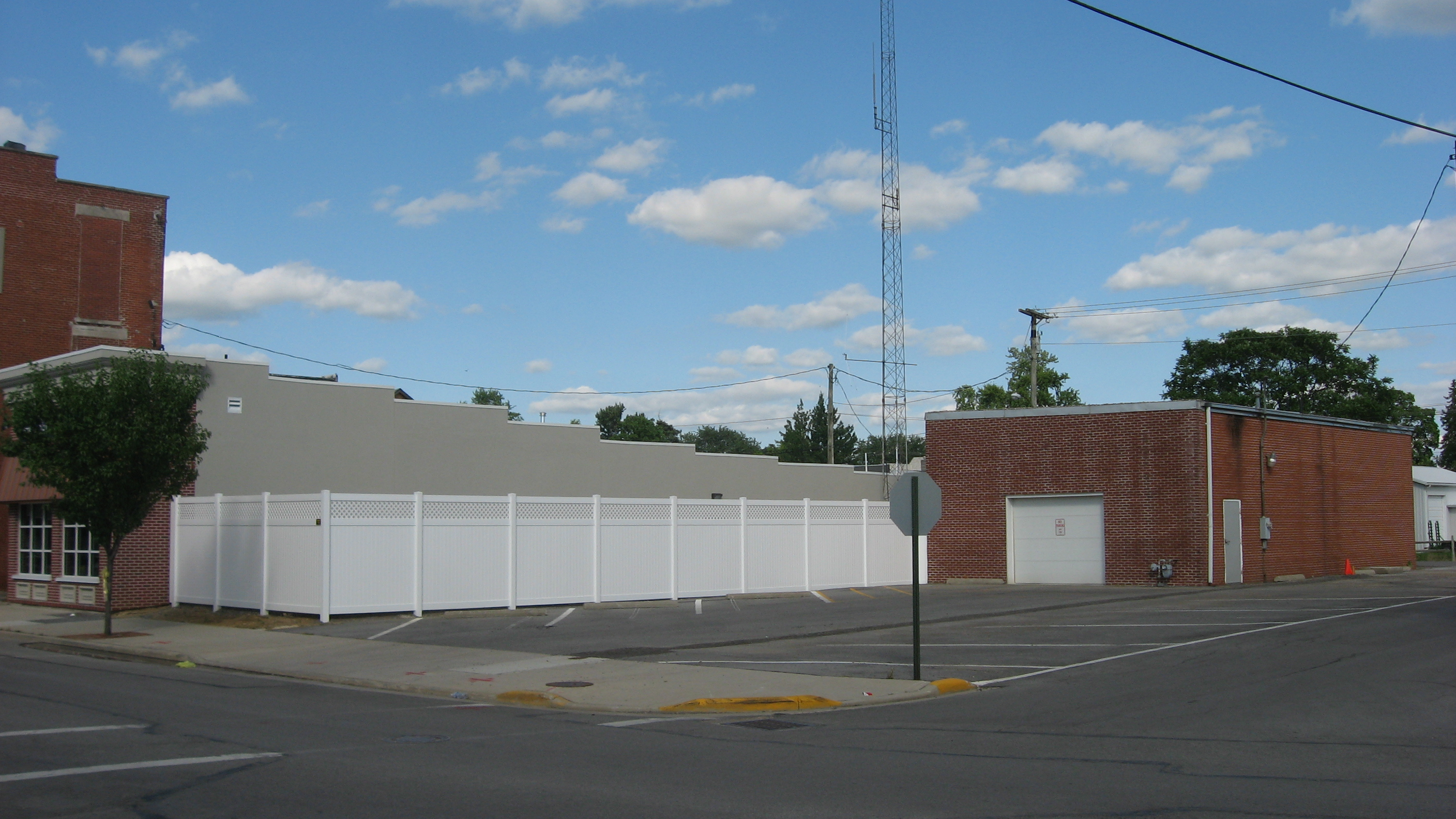
Site of the demolished village hall

In 1979, the building was listed on the National Register of Historic Places as the "Leipsic City Hall," even though Ohio law provides that communities with fewer than five thousand residents are villages. Designation as a historic site on the federal level does not affect the rights of property owners, including their right to demolish the property; therefore, the village of Leipsic has been able to destroy the building. Although the site of the village hall is now occupied by a parking lot, the building remains listed on the National Register.
