= Paulding, Ohio =

- Village
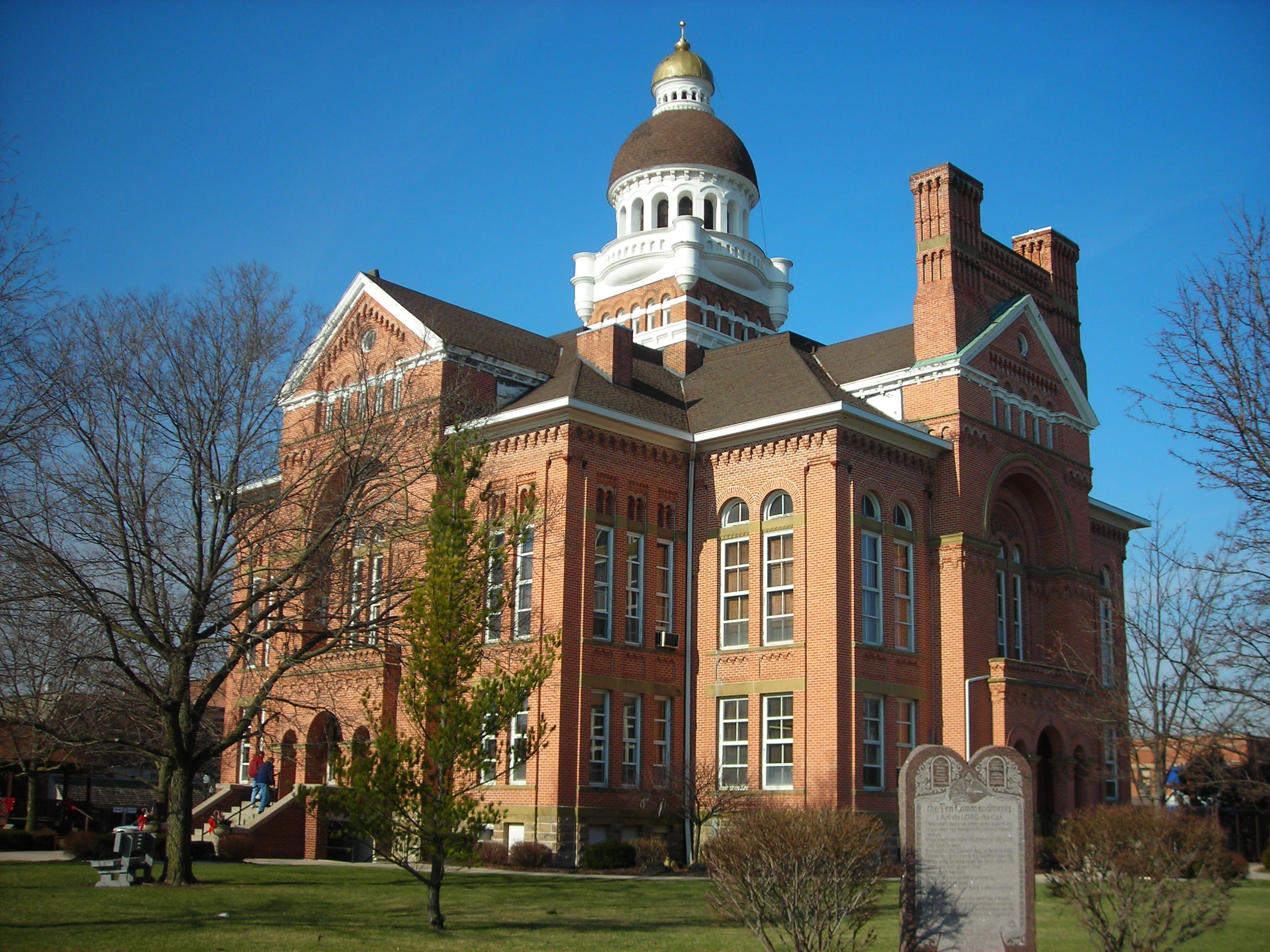
- Paulding County Courthouse
- Interactive map of Paulding, Ohio
- Location within Ohio Location within the United States
- Coordinates: 41°07′53″N 84°35′08″W
- Country: United States
- State: Ohio
- County: Paulding

Government
  - Mayor: Greg White

Area
  - Total: 2.49 sq mi (6.46 km^{2})
  - Land: 2.40 sq mi (6.21 km^{2})
  - Water: 0.097 sq mi (0.25 km^{2})
- Elevation: 722 ft (220 m)

Population (2020)
  - Total: 3,555
  - Density: 1,482.9/sq mi (572.55/km^{2})
- Time zone: UTC-5 (Eastern (EST))
  - Summer (DST): UTC-4 (EDT)
- ZIP code: 45879
- Area code: 419
- FIPS code: 39-61252
- GNIS feature ID: 2399632
- Website: http://villageofpaulding.com/

Paulding is a village in and the county seat of Paulding County, Ohio, United States. It is located predominantly in Paulding Township about 64 miles (103 km) southwest of Toledo. The population was 3,555 at the 2020 census.

== History ==
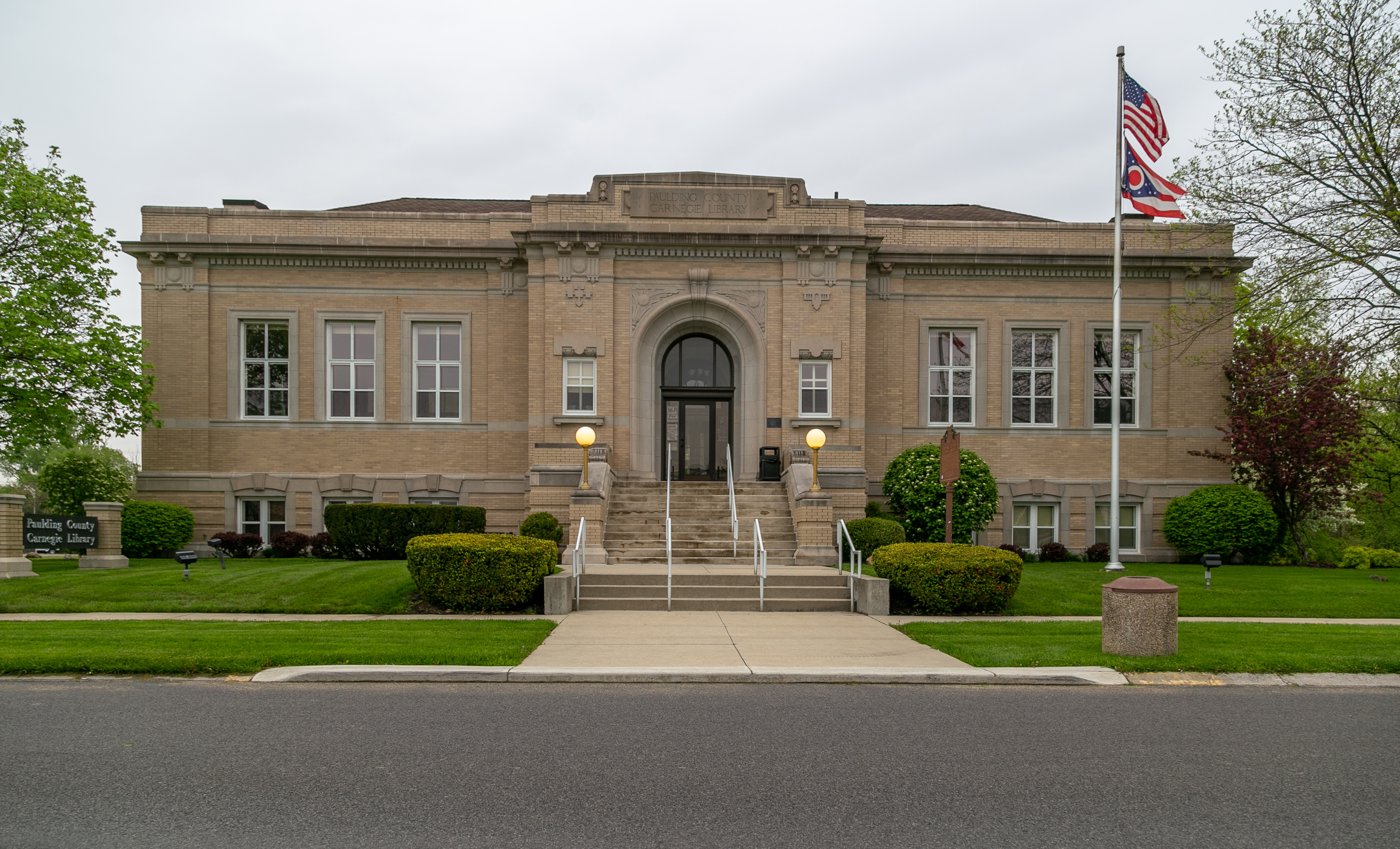
Paulding County Carnegie Library

Paulding was a planned community, founded in 1848 at the center of the county, and named after the county by speculators who expected to profit by moving the county seat. In 1851, the county seat was moved from Charloe, which had been the county seat for a decade; prior to that, court was held at New Rochester.

The town square is devoted to the courthouse, an orange brick structure surrounded by trees upon a spacious lawn. In the centennial year of 1876, the county commissioners determined to build a new courthouse, and visited many courthouses, finally deciding to erect a duplicate of the courthouse in Adrian, Michigan at a cost of $40,000. The courthouse was finished in 1886.

Built in the 1910s, the Paulding County Carnegie Library was the first Carnegie library to serve an entire county instead of a single city.

== Geography ==
According to the United States Census Bureau, the village has a total area of 2.46 square miles (6.37 km^{2}), of which 2.36 square miles (6.11 km^{2}) is land and 0.10 square miles (0.26 km^{2}) is water. It is 723 feet above sea level.

=== Climate ===
Climate data for Paulding, Ohio (1991–2020)
Month	Jan	Feb	Mar	Apr	May	Jun	Jul	Aug	Sep	Oct	Nov	Dec	Year
Mean daily maximum °F (°C)	32.5 (0.3)	36.0 (2.2)	47.1 (8.4)	60.7 (15.9)	72.3 (22.4)	81.4 (27.4)	85.1 (29.5)	83.0 (28.3)	77.5 (25.3)	64.6 (18.1)	49.7 (9.8)	37.8 (3.2)	60.6 (15.9)
Daily mean °F (°C)	24.7 (−4.1)	27.3 (−2.6)	37.2 (2.9)	49.0 (9.4)	60.7 (15.9)	70.5 (21.4)	73.7 (23.2)	71.5 (21.9)	65.2 (18.4)	53.1 (11.7)	40.7 (4.8)	30.4 (−0.9)	50.3 (10.2)
Mean daily minimum °F (°C)	16.8 (−8.4)	18.6 (−7.4)	27.2 (−2.7)	37.3 (2.9)	49.1 (9.5)	59.7 (15.4)	62.4 (16.9)	60.0 (15.6)	52.9 (11.6)	41.6 (5.3)	31.7 (−0.2)	22.9 (−5.1)	40.0 (4.4)
Average precipitation inches (mm)	2.43 (62)	2.03 (52)	2.56 (65)	3.47 (88)	4.44 (113)	4.01 (102)	3.64 (92)	3.62 (92)	2.92 (74)	2.80 (71)	2.78 (71)	2.30 (58)	37 (940)
Average snowfall inches (cm)	7.3 (19)	7.5 (19)	4.1 (10)	0.1 (0.25)	0.0 (0.0)	0.0 (0.0)	0.0 (0.0)	0.0 (0.0)	0.0 (0.0)	0.0 (0.0)	0.9 (2.3)	3.7 (9.4)	23.6 (59.95)
Source: NOAA

== Demographics ==
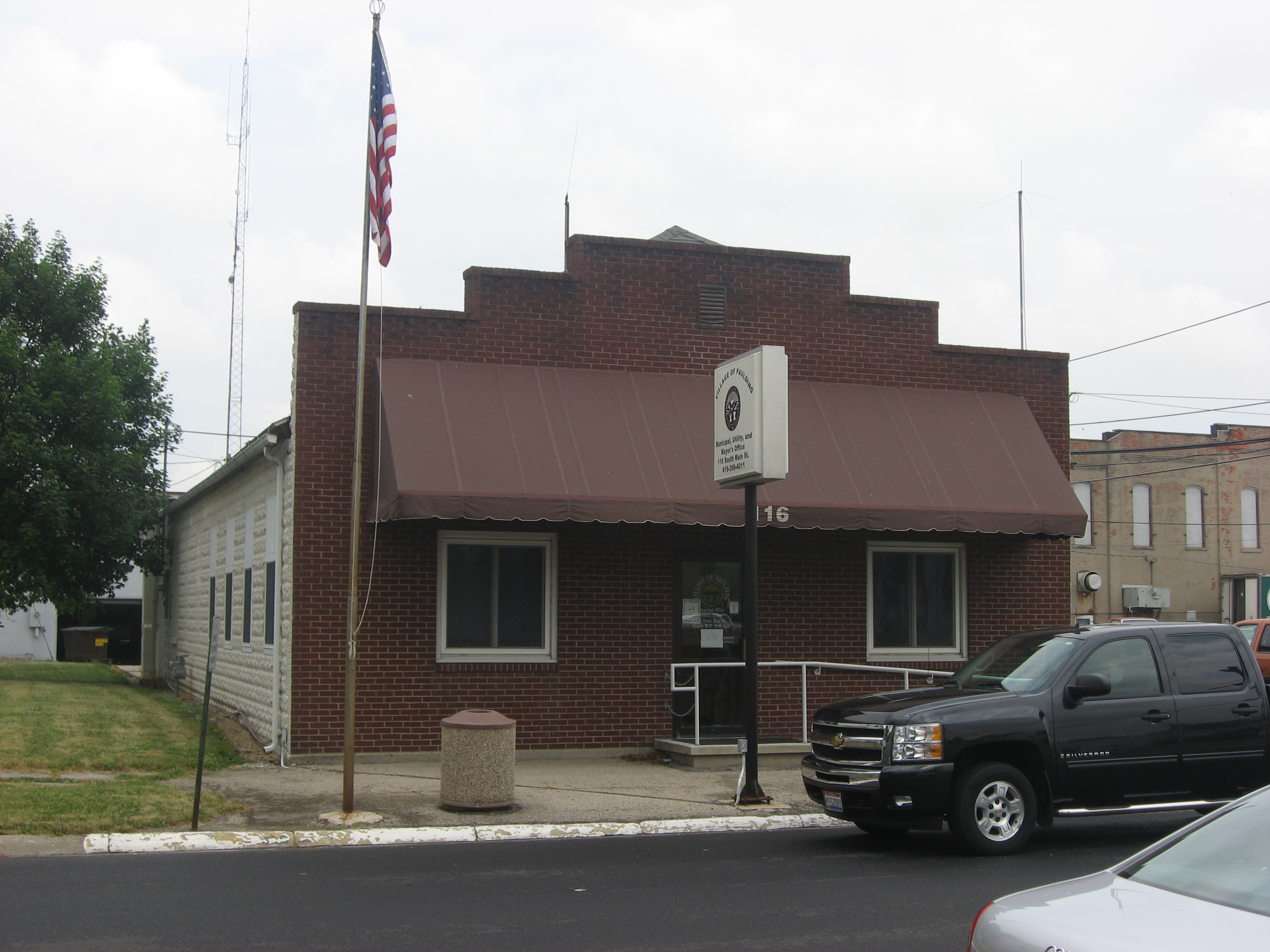
Paulding Village Hall

Historical population
Census	Pop.	Note	%±
1880	454		—
1890	1,879		313.9%
1900	2,080		10.7%
1910	2,081		0.0%
1920	2,106		1.2%
1930	1,904		−9.6%
1940	2,044		7.4%
1950	2,352		15.1%
1960	2,936		24.8%
1970	2,983		1.6%
1980	2,754		−7.7%
1990	2,605		−5.4%
2000	3,595		38.0%
2010	3,605		0.3%
2020	3,555		−1.4%
U.S. Decennial Census

=== 2020 census ===
As of the 2020 census, Paulding had a population of 3,555. The median age was 39.3 years. 23.6% of residents were under the age of 18 and 19.3% of residents were 65 years of age or older. For every 100 females there were 84.8 males, and for every 100 females age 18 and over there were 80.9 males age 18 and over.

0.0% of residents lived in urban areas, while 100.0% lived in rural areas.

There were 1,528 households in Paulding, of which 29.6% had children under the age of 18 living in them. Of all households, 39.7% were married-couple households, 17.5% were households with a male householder and no spouse or partner present, and 35.5% were households with a female householder and no spouse or partner present. About 34.0% of all households were made up of individuals and 15.5% had someone living alone who was 65 years of age or older.

There were 1,671 housing units, of which 8.6% were vacant. The homeowner vacancy rate was 1.9% and the rental vacancy rate was 9.2%.

Racial composition as of the 2020 census
Race	Number	Percent
White	3,051	85.8%
Black or African American	64	1.8%
American Indian and Alaska Native	21	0.6%
Asian	9	0.3%
Native Hawaiian and Other Pacific Islander	2	0.1%
Some other race	160	4.5%
Two or more races	248	7.0%
Hispanic or Latino (of any race)	368	10.4%

=== 2010 census ===
As of the census of 2010, there were 3,605 people, 1,510 households, and 957 families living in the village. The population density was 1,527.5 inhabitants per square mile (589.8/km^{2}). There were 1,718 housing units at an average density of 728.0 per square mile (281.1/km^{2}). The racial makeup of the village was 91.6% White, 2.4% African American, 0.3% Native American, 0.3% Asian, 2.8% from other races, and 2.6% from two or more races. Hispanic or Latino of any race were 8.5% of the population.

There were 1,510 households, of which 31.4% had children under the age of 18 living with them, 43.6% were married couples living together, 14.2% had a female householder with no husband present, 5.6% had a male householder with no wife present, and 36.6% were non-families. 31.5% of all households were made up of individuals, and 14.6% had someone living alone who was 65 years of age or older. The average household size was 2.35 and the average family size was 2.93.

The median age in the village was 38.4 years. 25.2% of residents were under the age of 18; 8.5% were between the ages of 18 and 24; 23.4% were from 25 to 44; 27% were from 45 to 64; and 16% were 65 years of age or older. The gender makeup of the village was 46.6% male and 53.4% female.

=== 2000 census ===
As of the census of 2000, there were 3,595 people, 1,466 households, and 988 families living in the village. The population density was 1,577.1 inhabitants per square mile (608.9/km^{2}). There were 1,583 housing units at an average density of 694.4 per square mile (268.1/km^{2}). The racial makeup of the village was 91.04% White, 2.56% African American, 0.22% Native American, 0.28% Asian, 3.81% from other races, and 2.09% from two or more races. Hispanic or Latino of any race were 6.93% of the population.

There were 1,466 households, out of which 33.0% had children under the age of 18 living with them, 51.7% were married couples living together, 11.1% had a female householder with no husband present, and 32.6% were non-families. 28.4% of all households were made up of individuals, and 13.7% had someone living alone who was 65 years of age or older. The average household size was 2.42 and the average family size was 2.96.

In the village, the population was spread out, with 25.6% under the age of 18, 9.5% from 18 to 24, 27.5% from 25 to 44, 22.1% from 45 to 64, and 15.3% who were 65 years of age or older. The median age was 37 years. For every 100 females there were 90.5 males. For every 100 females age 18 and over, there were 87.0 males.

The median income for a household in the village was $35,943, and the median income for a family was $41,962. Males had a median income of $33,042 versus $22,103 for females. The per capita income for the village was $17,383. About 6.3% of families and 9.0% of the population were below the poverty line, including 12.1% of those under age 18 and 5.3% of those age 65 or over.

== Economy ==
Paulding is largely a bedroom community.

At one point, Paulding had a factory processing sugar from beets, and another processing ketchup from tomatoes, but both factories have ceased production and neighboring farms no longer produce those crops. At one point, Paulding boasted of three local elevators - Equity Exchange, Paulding Grain and Seed, and the Farm Bureau - but the loss of rail service, most grain is trucked elsewhere. Paulding was once home to Betty Zane popcorn, but that disappeared in the early 20th century.

Many manufacturing facilities have come and gone, producing such products as glass mailboxes, ink wells, and brake linings. A number of small factories exist, but the largest single employer in the Village is the government, with Paulding Exempted Village Schools being the largest organization. Many residents commute to industrial jobs, often in neighboring counties.

== Education ==
Paulding High School sports participate in the Green Meadows Conference, an athletic body sanctioned by the Ohio High School Athletic Association (OHSAA).

The school on Water Street is one of the largest schools in the state providing elementary education. In many districts, elementary schools are kept small so students can walk to school. The graduating class of 1970 included the last Paulding students who experienced a one-room schoolhouse, as they had attended the first grade at Emerald. That was a fairly pleasant transition, unlike 1971, when many county residents were outraged to learn Dr. Martin Essex of the Ohio State Board of Education had revoked the charters of 4 of the 6 Paulding County schools, asserting that they were too small to offer a good education. Auglaize-Brown asked to join the Paulding Exempted Village School district, while the Grover Hill, Blue Creek, and Payne Local School Districts merged into the new Wayne Trace school district.

== Media ==
The dominant daily newspaper is the Defiance Crescent-News with some readers choosing the Fort Wayne Journal-Gazette, Toledo Blade, and Lima News, in that order. The local weekly is the Paulding County Progress. Paulding residents are part of the Fort Wayne, Indiana television market. The local radio station is WMYW-FM broadcasts at 102.7 FM. WPAU is an online streaming radio station offering a commercial-free format of oldies and Paulding County high school sports. Also licensed to Paulding is WKSD 99.7 FM, a commercial oldies and sports radio station based in Van Wert.

== Transportation ==
Paulding is at the intersection of US Highway 127 and State Route 111 and the terminus of State Route 500. It was formerly on the Cincinnati Northern Railroad, but the tracks were removed in the 1980s.

== Notable people ==
- Jesse B. Jackson, American Consul and witness to the Armenian genocide
- David Smith, sculptor (born in Decatur, grew up in Paulding)
