= Antwerp, Ohio =

- Village
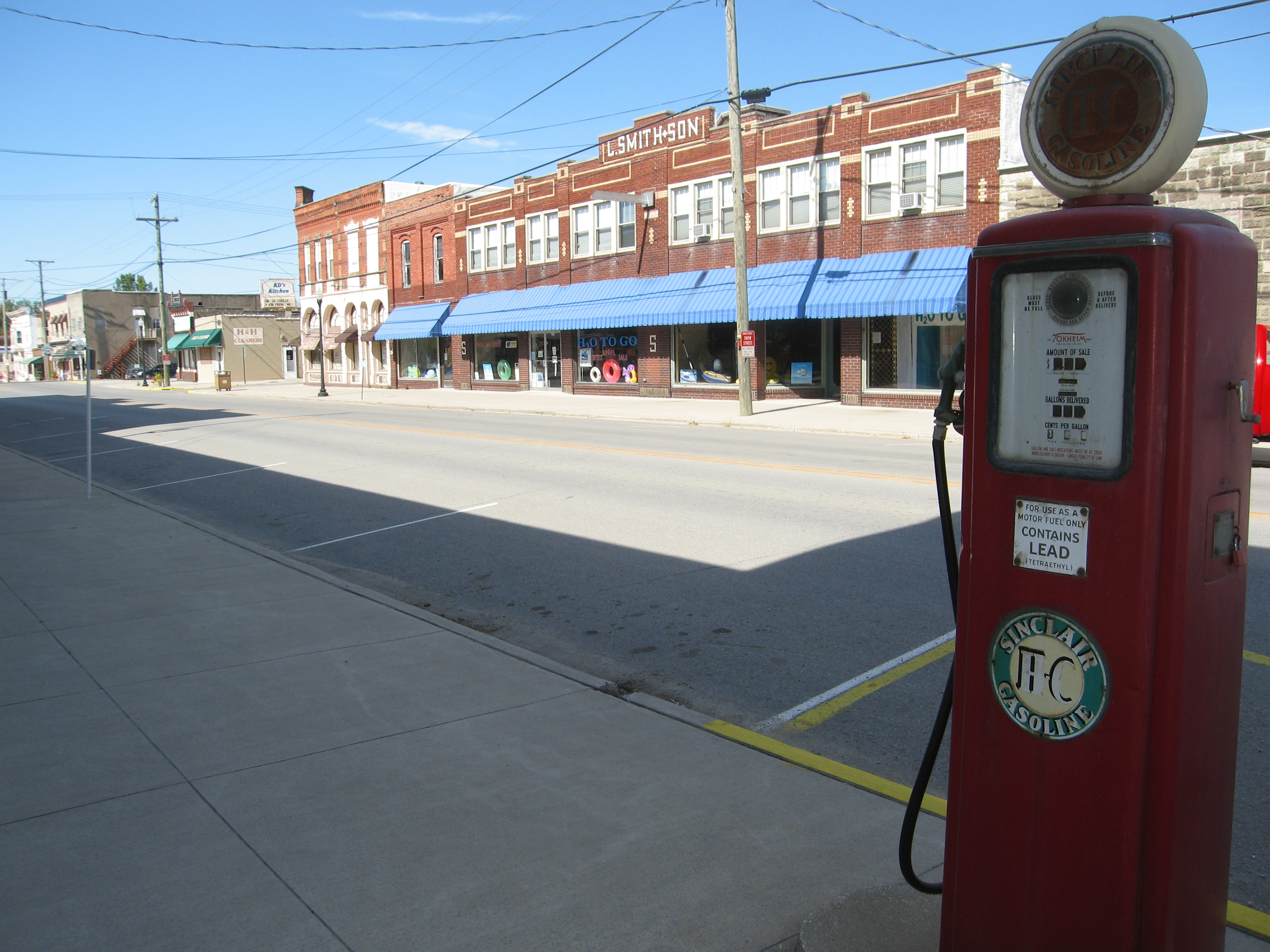
- Main Street downtown

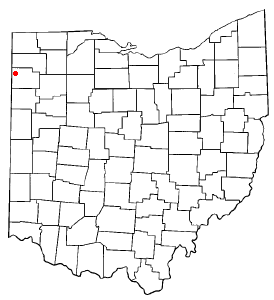
- Location of Antwerp, Ohio

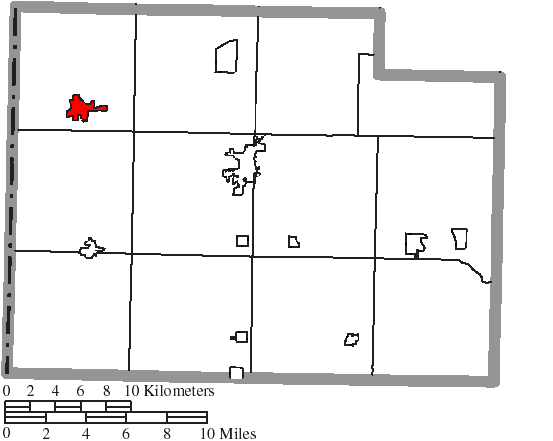
- Location of Antwerp in Paulding County
- Coordinates: 41°10′40″N 84°44′41″W
- Country: United States
- State: Ohio
- County: Paulding
- Township: Carryall

Area
  - Total: 1.33 sq mi (3.45 km^{2})
  - Land: 1.33 sq mi (3.45 km^{2})
  - Water: 0 sq mi (0.00 km^{2})
- Elevation: 728 ft (222 m)

Population (2020)
  - Total: 1,676
  - Estimate (2023): 1,681
  - Density: 1,258.1/sq mi (485.76/km^{2})
- Time zone: UTC-5 (Eastern (EST))
  - Summer (DST): UTC-4 (EDT)
- ZIP code: 45813
- Area code: 419
- FIPS code: 39-02204
- GNIS feature ID: 2397971
- Website: https://villageofantwerp.com/

Antwerp is a village in Paulding County, Ohio, United States, along the Maumee River. The population was 1,676 at the 2020 census.

Antwerp is the nearest village to the Six Mile Reservoir, the site of the Reservoir War in 1887. Antwerp is the birthplace of Asa Long, the checkers player. The place is named after the Belgian city of Antwerp.

== History ==
Antwerp is located in the former wetland region known until the 19th century as the Great Black Swamp. Antwerp was founded in 1841 on the Wabash and Erie canal and the center of town moved to its present location when the railroad was extended to that point. The village was named after Antwerp, in Belgium.

In the late 19th century, Antwerp was the largest village in Paulding County; its economy was driven by lucrative local logging and tile mill industries. Accordingly, when the Wabash, St. Louis and Pacific Railway decided to erect a train station in the village, it was built larger than stations in most other communities in the region. After the train station closed in 1976, it was purchased by the local historical society; today, it is listed on the National Register of Historic Places as the Antwerp Norfolk and Western Depot.

== Geography ==
According to the United States Census Bureau, the village has a total area of 1.33 square miles (3.44 km^{2}), all land.

== Demographics ==
Historical population
Census	Pop.	Note	%±
1870	717		—
1880	1,275		77.8%
1890	1,331		4.4%
1900	1,206		−9.4%
1910	1,187		−1.6%
1920	1,096		−7.7%
1930	1,024		−6.6%
1940	1,086		6.1%
1950	1,162		7.0%
1960	1,465		26.1%
1970	1,735		18.4%
1980	1,765		1.7%
1990	1,677		−5.0%
2000	1,740		3.8%
2010	1,736		−0.2%
2020	1,676		−3.5%
2023 (est.)	1,681	▲	0.3%
U.S. Decennial Census

=== 2010 census ===
As of the census of 2010, there were 1,736 people, 752 households, and 464 families residing in the village. The population density was 1,305.3 inhabitants per square mile (504.0/km^{2}). There were 838 housing units at an average density of 630.1 per square mile (243.3/km^{2}). The racial makeup of the village was 96.6% White, 0.7% African American, 0.1% Native American (U.S. Census), 0.1% Asian, 1.2% from other races, and 1.4% from two or more races. Hispanic or Latino of any race were 4.8% of the population.

There were 752 households, of which 32.8% had children under the age of 18 living with them, 44.0% were married couples living together, 12.4% had a female householder with no husband present, 5.3% had a male householder with no wife present, and 38.3% were non-families. 33.1% of all households were made up of individuals, and 13.8% had someone living alone who was 65 years of age or older. The average household size was 2.31 and the average family size was 2.90.

The median age in the village was 37.9 years. 26.3% of residents were under the age of 18; 7.3% were between the ages of 18 and 24; 24.1% were from 25 to 44; 26.5% were from 45 to 64; and 15.7% were 65 years of age or older. The gender makeup of the village was 48.2% male and 51.8% female.

=== 2000 census ===
As of the census of 2000, there were 1,740 people, 739 households, and 487 families residing in the village. The population density was 1,500.1 inhabitants per square mile (579.2/km^{2}). There were 784 housing units at an average density of 675.9 per square mile (261.0/km^{2}). The racial makeup of the village was 97.82% White, 0.34% African American, 0.34% Native American, 0.69% from other races, and 0.80% from two or more races. Hispanic or Latino (U.S. Census) of any race were 2.18% of the population.

There were 739 households, out of which 32.3% had children under the age of 18 living with them, 50.5% were married couples living together, 12.0% had a female householder with no husband present, and 34.1% were non-families. 31.4% of all households were made up of individuals, and 12.9% had someone living alone who was 65 years of age or older. The average household size was 2.35 and the average family size was 2.97.

In the village, the population was spread out, with 26.3% under the age of 18, 9.5% from 18 to 24, 28.9% from 25 to 44, 20.7% from 45 to 64, and 14.7% who were 65 years of age or older. The median age was 36 years. For every 100 females, there were 90.8 males. For every 100 females age 18 and over, there were 89.8 males.

The median income for a household in the village was $33,139, and the median income for a family was $40,441. Males had a median income of $33,684 versus $23,158 for females. The per capita income for the village was $18,785. About 5.6% of families and 8.9% of the population were below the poverty line, including 12.1% of those under age 18 and 6.6% of those age 65 or over.

== Education ==
Antwerp Local School District operates one elementary school and Antwerp High School.

Antwerp has a public library, a branch of the Paulding County Carnegie Library.
