= Loomis Observatory =

Coordinates: 41°14′38″N 81°26′14″W

- U.S. National Register of Historic Places
- A three-room Flemish bond brick building, 37 feet by 16 feet, domed in copper over the central section.

- Location within Ohio Location within the United States
- Location: Aurora St and College St, Hudson, Ohio
- Area: less than one acre
- Built: 1838
- Architect: Simeon Porter
- NRHP reference No.: 75001539
- Added to NRHP: June 30, 1975

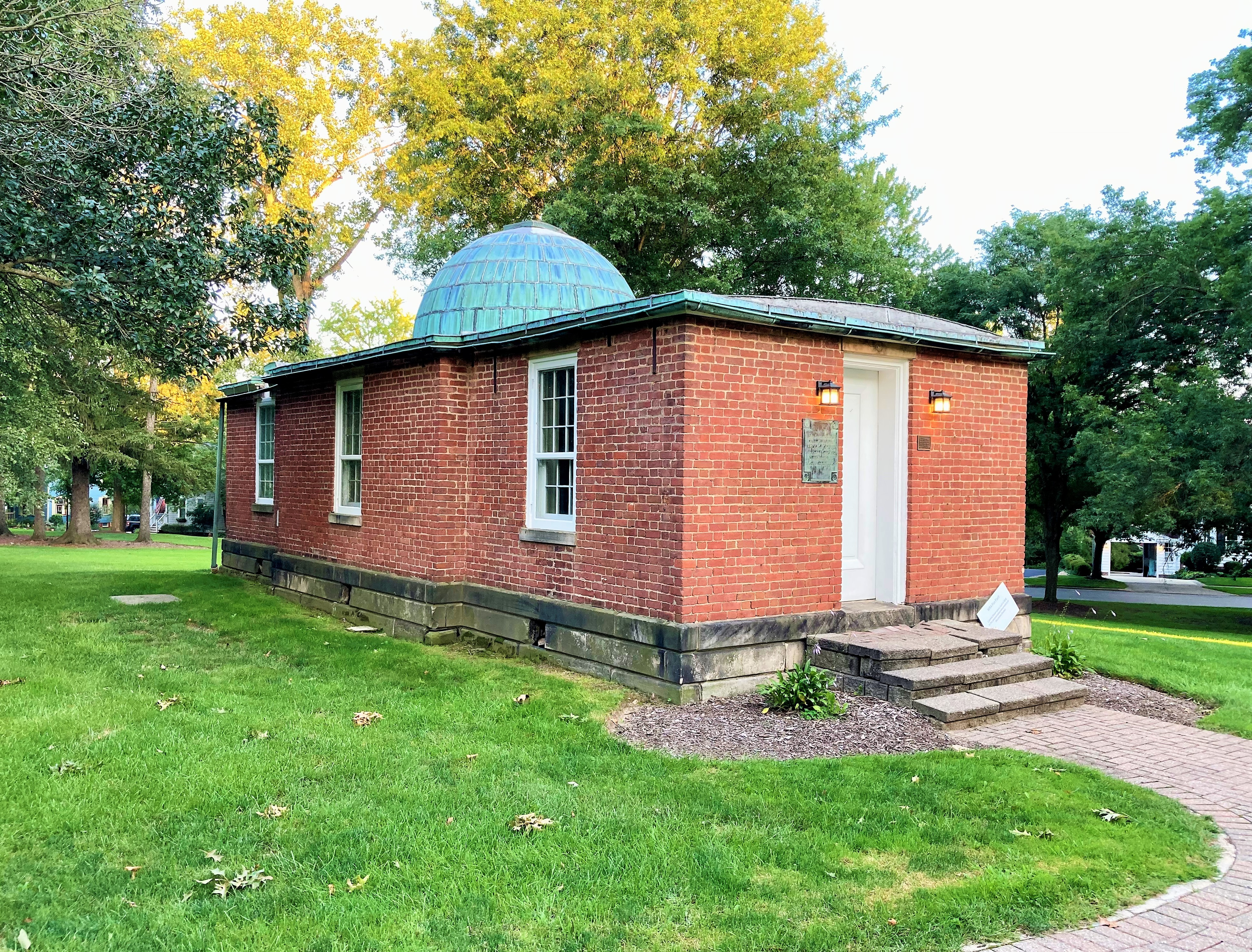

Loomis Observatory (also known as the Elias Loomis Observatory) is the second oldest observatory in the United States, located in Hudson, Ohio. Construction was completed in 1838. It is on the campus of Western Reserve Academy, a college preparatory school. When the observatory was constructed the school was Western Reserve College, which later relocated to Cleveland and is now known as Case Western Reserve University.

The Loomis Observatory is the oldest observatory in the United States still sitting in its original location. The oldest American observatory, the Hopkins Observatory at Williams College, also completed in 1838, has been relocated twice in its history.

Under the influence and design of Professor Elias Loomis, who purchased the necessary instruments in England after studying in Europe, the observatory was built by architect Simeon Porter. The original Troughton & Simms equatorial telescope and Robert Molyneux-built astronomical clock remain in the observatory dating to 1837.

An inscription on the historic marker reads: "Elias Loomis and Charles Augustus Young worked in this Observatory, built in 1838, the third to be erected in the United States, the second oldest standing (1926)."

James Ellsworth restored the observatory in 1908, and it was again restored in 1963.
