= Western Reserve Academy =

Private school in Hudson, Ohio, US

Location
- 115 College Street; Hudson, Ohio 44236-2999; United States; 41.248685°N 81.435494°W

Information
- Former name: Western Reserve College and Preparatory School
- Type: Independent college-preparatory boarding and day high school
- Motto: Latin: Lux et Veritas (Light and Truth)
- Established: 7 February 1826; 200 years ago
- Founder: David Hudson
- Status: Currently operational
- Trust: Board of Trustees
- CEEB code: 362655
- NCES School ID: 01064121
- President: Martin D. Franks '68; Nathaniel E. Leonard '82
- Head of school: Suzanne Walker Buck
- Faculty: 51.4 (on an FTE basis)
- Grades: 9–12
- Gender: Coeducational
- Enrollment: 390 (2019-2020)
  - Grade 9: 84
  - Grade 10: 103
  - Grade 11: 84
  - Grade 12: 119
- Average class size: 11
- Student to teacher ratio: 7.6:1
- Hours in school day: 7.2
- Campus size: 190 acres (77 ha)
- Campus type: Suburban
- Colors: Hunter Green and White
- Athletics: 23 interscholastic
- Nickname: Pioneers
- Rivals: University School; The Kiski School; Linsly School
- Accreditation: HLC
- SAT average: 1340
- Endowment: $64.42 million
- Annual tuition: $71,250 (boarding) $46,000 (day)
- Revenue: $38.11 million
- Affiliation: GCSDAC, NAIS, and TABS
- Website: www.wra.net
- Western Reserve Academy
- U.S. National Register of Historic Places
- U.S. Historic district
- Location within Ohio Location within the United States
- Location: Roughly bounded by Aurora St. and both sides of Oviatt, High, Hudson, Ohio
- Area: 58 acres (23 ha)
- Architect: Porter, Simeon; Et al.
- Architectural style: Greek Revival, Federal
- NRHP reference No.: 75001539
- Added to NRHP: June 30, 1975

Western Reserve Academy (WRA), or simply Reserve, is a private, midsized, coeducational boarding and day college preparatory school located in Hudson, Ohio, United States. Western Reserve Academy is largely a residential campus, with 280 of 390 students living on campus and the remainder attending as day students. Students from over 20 states and 15 countries attend.

== History ==
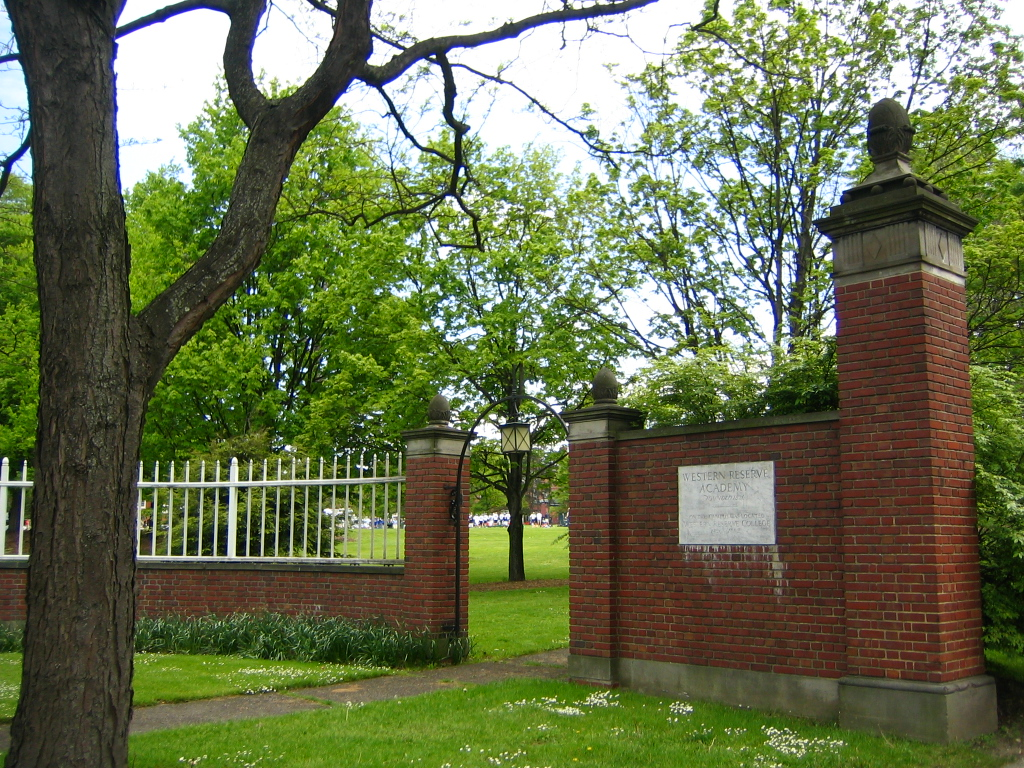
The gates at Chapel Street

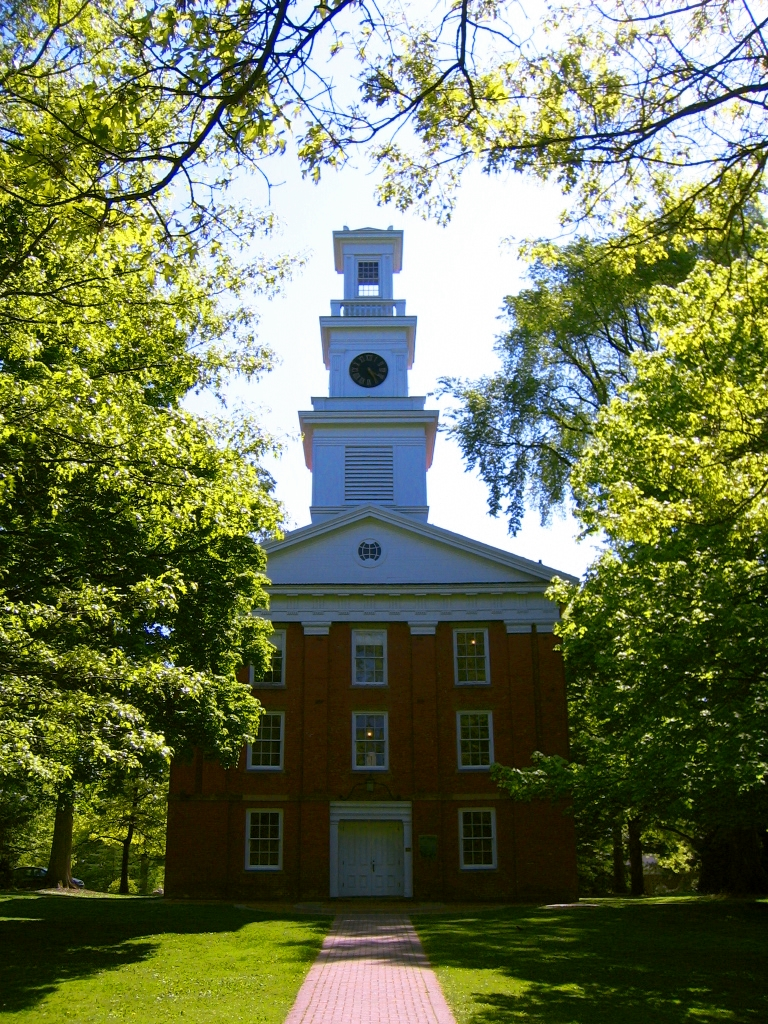
The chapel

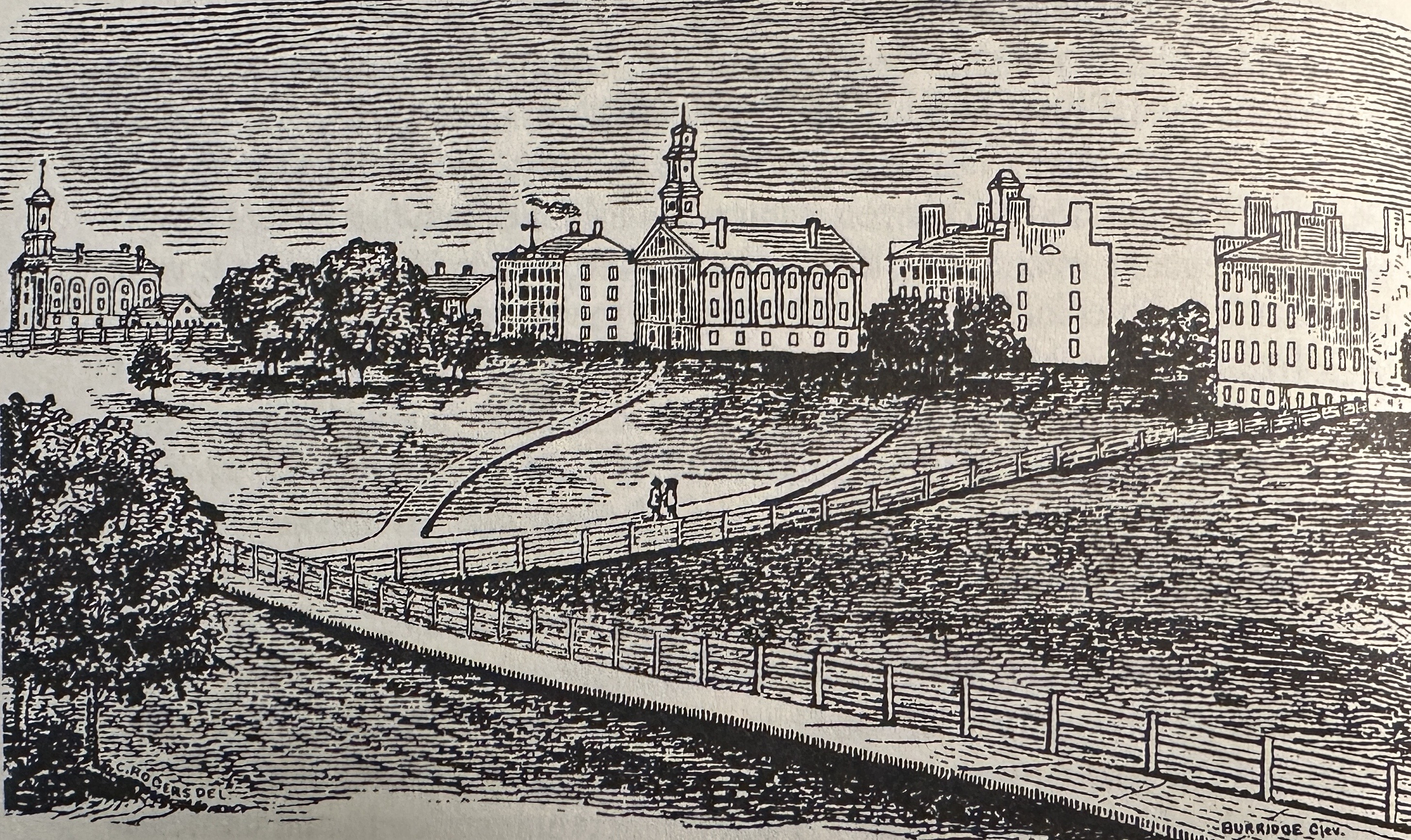
Western Reserve College in 1856

Western Reserve Academy was established on February 7, 1826, as the Western Reserve College and Preparatory School in Hudson, Ohio, on a 190-acre (77 ha) plot of land set aside by charter by the Ohio legislature. Reserve is the 27th oldest preparatory boarding school in the United States, and the oldest outside of the Northeast.

The institution's name comes from the area in which it was built, the Connecticut Western Reserve, as it was the first of its kind in Northern Ohio. The settlers from Connecticut wanted to build a school on a par with Yale College. They selected the same architectural design, with brick buildings and the same motto, Lux et Veritas. People called it "the Yale of the West." The first cohort included eleven students at the college level and eight at the preparatory level. In 1882, the college section moved north to Cleveland and became Western Reserve University, later merging with the Case Institute of Technology to become Case Western Reserve University. Western Reserve Academy remained open for another twenty-one years until 1903, when it closed due to financial problems.

In 1916, however, the school reopened with the support of James Ellsworth, a former student and Hudson resident who had returned after becoming wealthy in the coal industry. The "Ellsworth Era" was marked by significant construction: Seymour Hall (the newly appointed academic building), the Bicknell Gymnasium, and Ellsworth Hall (a dormitory and dining hall). In 1922, Western Reserve Academy became an all-boys institution, remaining so for 50 years until 1972, when girls were admitted to the junior class, once again becoming a co-ed institution.

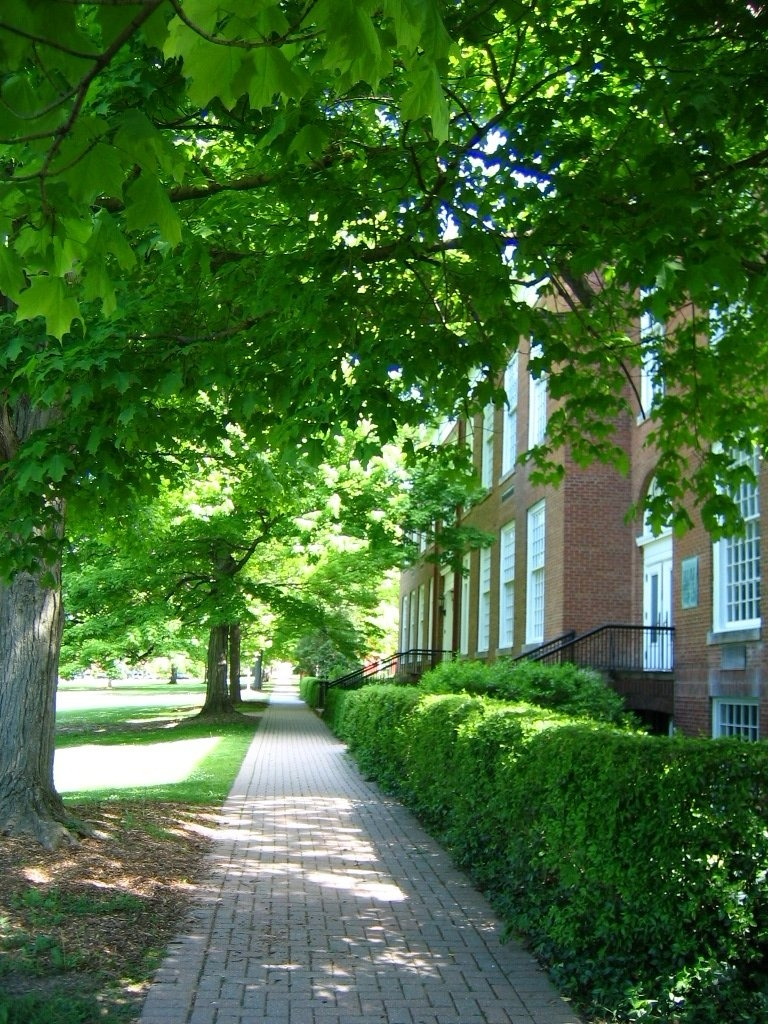
The historic "Brick Row"

In 2001, Western Reserve Academy was recognized by U.S. News & World Report as one of the top boarding schools in the country.

== Extracurricular activities ==
=== Athletics ===
The school offers various sports, including soccer, golf, cross-country, field hockey, volleyball, swimming and diving, basketball, wrestling, rifle, baseball, softball, track and field, tennis, fencing, and lacrosse.

Western Reserve Academy has become one of the top high school lacrosse teams in the United States. In 2006 and 2009, WRA won the Midwest Scholastic Lacrosse Championship and respectively finished ranked 27th and 28th nationally according to LaxPower.com. Only three different teams have won the Midwest Championships since 1992: Brother Rice High School, Western Reserve Academy, and Upper Arlington High School. Inside Lacrosse ranked the 2009 WRA lacrosse team number one in the Midwest.

The track and cross-country teams achieved success from the 1940s through the 1980s, winning many Interstate League championships, with the cross-country team once boasting a streak of 179–1. The WRA track is named after track and cross country coach Frank Longstreth and hosts the annual Frank Longstreth Relays.

In 2012, the girls' and boys' soccer teams achieved state rankings, with the boys' team going undefeated and the girls' teams, both JV and varsity, breaking the record for most wins in a season. The boys tied the top Ohio Division I team St. Ignatius High School and finishing the year atop the Ohio Division III rankings.

Traditionally, a rivalry with University School has existed, with the two first playing each other in 1895. Other notable rivalries include The Kiski School, Linsly School, and Hawken School.

=== Arts ===
Reserve offers over 20 classes for students interested in the arts. Courses are available through the school's music, dance, theater, and visual arts programs. 2D and 3D art rooms are always available to students, as are a graphic design computer lab and a woodworking workshop. Most fine arts programs are housed in the Knight Fine Arts Center (KFAC), with the music program headquartered in Hayden Hall. KFAC contains several classrooms, a theater, and a dance studio. The Moos Gallery, also in KFAC, features students' work and exhibits from established artists.

KFAC is also home to the Wang Innovation Center (WIC), allowing students to take classes as part of WRA's interdisciplinary curriculum.

=== Traditions ===
Western Reserve Academy has several traditions. One of the most popular is Vespers, a Christmas Concert and sit-down meal right before students leave for winter break. Another is sit-down meals. The entire faculty and student body have a sit-down lunch each Wednesday. Students alternate eating the family-style meal with their academic advisors and in randomly selected mixed groups. These intimate "mixed sit-down" settings allow students to form connections with peers. Another frequent tradition is the victory bell. Almost lost after the construction of the Murdough Athletic Center, this tradition was rekindled when the bell was reinstalled in 2012. After each Reserve athletic victory, the players on the winning team take turns ringing the bell loud enough for the entire campus to hear. Reserve students also participate in artistic and musical traditions, including the annual "Messiah Sing" concert. The Academy String Orchestra and Academy Choir perform Handel's Messiah and invite the audience to join in for many songs. Although this is a celebrated tradition, "Messiah Sing" has not taken place since 2021.

Finally, the last tradition Reserve students experience, Commencement, is set just outside the historic chapel. The graduating men wear Reserve green-and-white pants, while the women wear white dresses. They are led through campus by bagpipers and followed by the faculty. As each student is called up, they receive their diploma and the alum tie (for men) or pin (for women).

==== Dress code ====
Western Reserve Academy enforces a relatively strict dress code daily. On Mondays and Fridays, the "Reserve Green" dress code is enforced, in which all students are required to wear a green blazer with the Academy crest or a "Reserve Captain Sweater" over a white collared shirt. Boys must wear khaki pants and a green-and-white striped tie or bow tie. Girls are permitted to wear either a green kilt or khaki pants. On Tuesdays, Wednesdays, and Thursdays, students wear the more relaxed "School Dress". Coats, sweaters, and ties are optional. Students are permitted to wear blouses or collared dress shirts, including polo shirts, and are required to wear dress pants, skirts, or dresses.

== Campus ==
=== Chapel and Loomis Observatory ===
WRA's campus houses many old buildings. However, two in particular stand out: the Loomis Observatory and the chapel, both listed on the National Register of Historic Places. Initially built in 1836 and most recently updated in 2021, the chapel is still used today for Morning meetings twice weekly, as well as the yearly Commencement ceremony. In addition, marriages, concerts, and gatherings take place inside the chapel. Even though the school itself is nondenominational, the chapel had a cross hanging front and center, which is a replica of one that used to hang in the Spanish monastery Santa Maria de La Rabida (La Rábida Friary). It is said that Christopher Columbus prayed before that cross before he voyaged to the New World. During the 2021 renovation, the organ at the altar was removed and replaced with a restoration of the original windowed façade. The cross and other WRA antiquities were put on display on the first floor of the building, while the chapel itself takes up the second and third floor.

The Loomis Observatory, initially named The Observatory, was built in 1838. It was the third observatory built in the country and is currently the second oldest observatory in the United States, only behind the Hopkins Observatory at Williams College. The Hudson building was named for astronomer Elias Loomis. This three-room observatory still stands, sitting close to the edge of the campus near the music building, Hayden Hall. The building itself is closed from public view, as well as the telescope housed in the observatory, which is no longer used (in favor of a newer and more secluded observatory on Cross Country Hill).

=== Ong Library ===
Named after Ambassador John D. Ong, the Ong Library is a 21,000 sq ft. building located on the south end of campus. It contains nearly 23,000 books, 3,000 DVDs and CDs, and 110 periodicals. Open to students all day through study hours, the library features two computer labs and a dozen group study rooms. The basement also contains the Western Reserve Academy Archives Collection, which traces the 200-year history of the school and town.

=== Dormitories ===
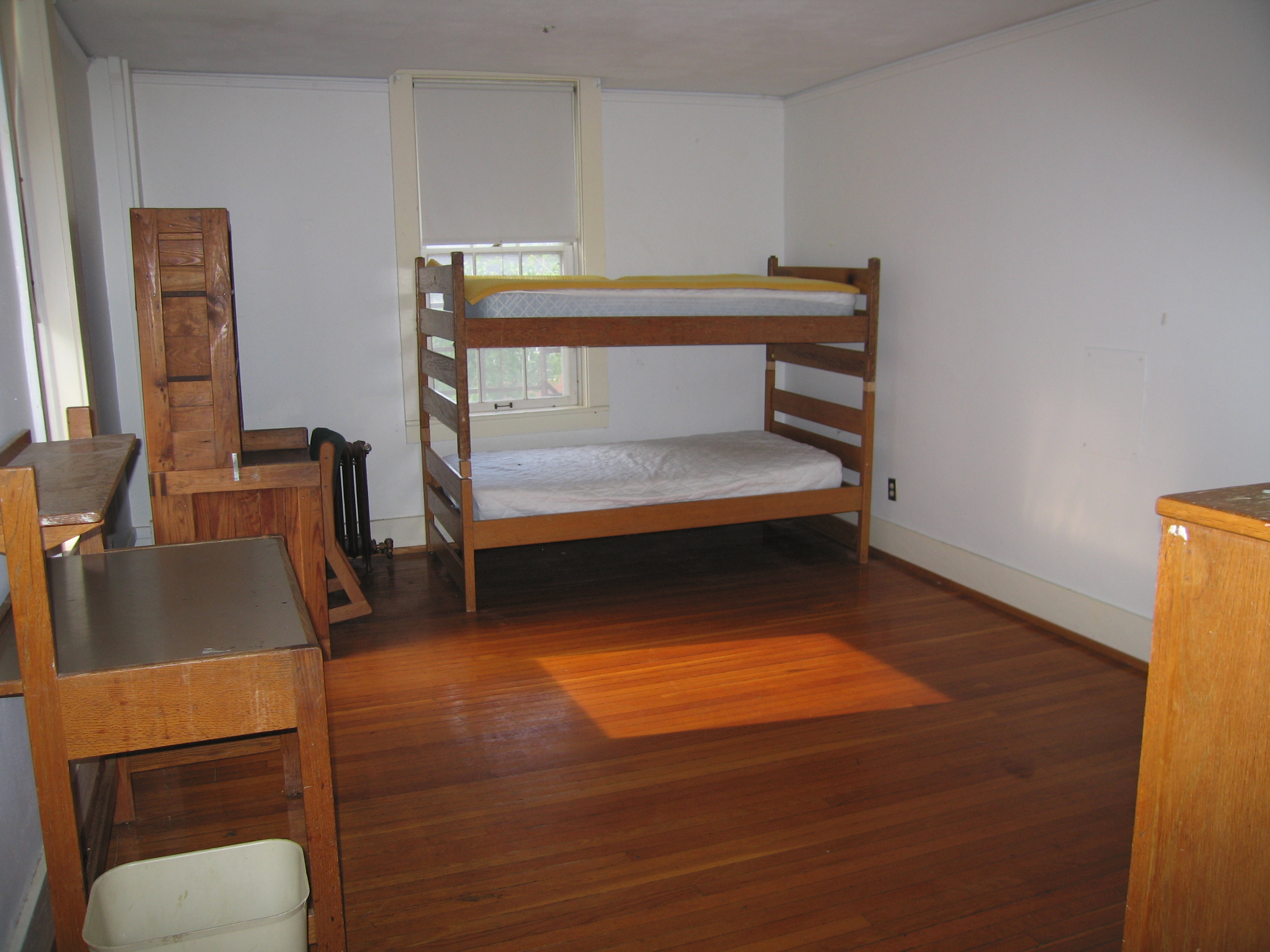
A typical Reserve male dorm room in the old Athenaeum

There are ten dormitories in which over 200 boarding students reside during the school year. The oldest is North Hall, erected in 1838, and the newest is Bicknell House. Each dorm houses students in single, double, triple, or quad rooms, with shared bathrooms.

Each dorm has 2-3 faculty residents, one serving as Dorm Head, all of whom live in connected apartments. Approximately 85% of the faculty members reside on campus in either faculty homes or dormitory apartments.

== Notable alumni ==
Individuals with a † next to their name were enrolled in either or both institutions before Western Reserve College moved from the Hudson campus to Cleveland in 1882 and became Western Reserve University. The degree to which they were affiliated with both institutions may vary. Individuals with a * next to their name did not complete their studies.

=== Politics, government, and law ===
- William B. Allison† — U.S. senator from Iowa
- David R. Paige† — U.S. representative from Ohio
- Mark Hanna*† — U.S. senator from Ohio, campaign manager for President William McKinley, chairman of Republican National Committee
- Louis P. Harvey† — 7th governor of Wisconsin
- William H. Upson† 1842 — U.S. representative from Ohio, lawyer
- George Hoadly† — 36th governor of Ohio
- James W. Dawes† — sixth governor of Nebraska
- George K. Nash† 1860 — 41st governor of Ohio
- John Hessin Clarke† — Associate justice of the U.S. Supreme Court
- Walter Folger Brown 1888 — U.S. postmaster general
- William R. Hopkins 1892 — Politician, first city manager of Cleveland, Ohio, namesake of Cleveland Hopkins International Airport
- David S. Dennison '36 — U.S. representative from Ohio, member of Federal Trade Commission
- Ronald B. Cameron '45 — U.S. representative from California
- James Robertson '55 — Federal District Court judge; former Foreign Intelligence Surveillance Court judge; presided over Hamdan v. Rumsfeld
- Daniel W. Christman '61 — Former assistant to the chairman of the Joint Chiefs of Staff, former superintendent of the U.S. Military Academy at West Point; current senior vice president for international affairs for the U.S. Chamber of Commerce
- Oliver Everett '62 — Royal librarian to Elizabeth II of the United Kingdom
- Thomas C. Sawyer* '63 — U.S. Representative from Ohio, former member of the Ohio State Senate
- Martin R. Hoke '69 — U.S. Representative from Ohio
- Neel Kashkari '91 — Head of the U.S. Office of Financial Stability, assistant secretary of the Treasury, candidate for Governor of California in 2014

=== Literature and journalism ===
- Rupert Hughes 1888 — Novelist, film director, historian, composer
- Lucien Price 1901 — Journalist for The Boston Globe, author
- R. W. Apple Jr. '52 — Associate editor for The New York Times
- Martin Perlich '55 — Radio broadcaster and writer
- Ted Gup '68 — Author of A Secret Gift
- Chris Gulker '69 — Photojournalist, writer, two-time Pulitzer Prize nominee
- Ian Frazier '69 — Nonfiction author and essayist
- Andrew Meldrum '70 — Senior editor at GlobalPost; former Zimbabwe correspondent for The Economist, The Guardian
- John Yang '75 — PBS Newshour correspondent, former NBC News and ABC News correspondent, Peabody Award winner, former writer for The Washington Post and The Wall Street Journal
- Kevin Prufer '88 — Poet, novelist, essayist, editor. 2024 Rilke Prize for American poetry.

=== Arts and entertainment ===
- D.M. Marshman Jr. '41 — Academy Award-winning screenplay writer for Sunset Boulevard.
- Frederick Coffin '61 — Film and television actor
- Jeff Schaffer '87 — Film director, TV show writer (Seinfeld, Curb Your Enthusiasm, The League)
- Richard Brake '83 — Film actor (Batman Begins)
- Macy Gray* '84 — Grammy Award-winning musician/singer
- Ted Humphrey '87 — Emmy Award-nominated television and film writer and producer

=== Business ===
- James Ellsworth† 1868 — Coal mine owner, banker
- James L. Knight '29 — Newspaperman and philanthropist, founder of Knight Ridder newspaper group
- William D. Perez '65 — CEO of Wm. Wrigley Jr. Company, former CEO of Nike, Inc.

=== Sports ===
- Keith Carter '48 — Olympic swimmer; silver medalist at 1948 Summer Olympic Games
- Brandon Collier '05 – Professional football player
- Joel Dalgarno '05 — Professional lacrosse player for the Colorado Mammoth; all-time scoring leader for Ohio State Buckeyes
- Chris Livingston, professional basketball player

=== Miscellaneous ===
- John Strong Newberry — Geologist, physician, explorer
- Frederic de Forest Allen — Philologist, classics scholar
- Lincoln Ellsworth — U.S. explorer; first undisputed sighting of North Pole; Two-time recipient of the Congressional Gold Medal
- Scott E. Forbush '20 — Physicist, discoverer of the Forbush decrease, member of the National Academy of Sciences
- George Kubler '29 — Art historian
- Lee Morin '70 — NASA astronaut
- Thomas Day Seymour 1870 - educator

== Notable faculty ==
- Beriah Green, taught at Western Reserve College and the Prefatory Academy
- Edward Morley, taught at Western Reserve College and the Prefatory Academy
- Joseph Frederick Waring, taught at Western Reserve Academy for 32 years; had an award named in his honor
