= Elias Loomis =

American science writer (1811–1889)

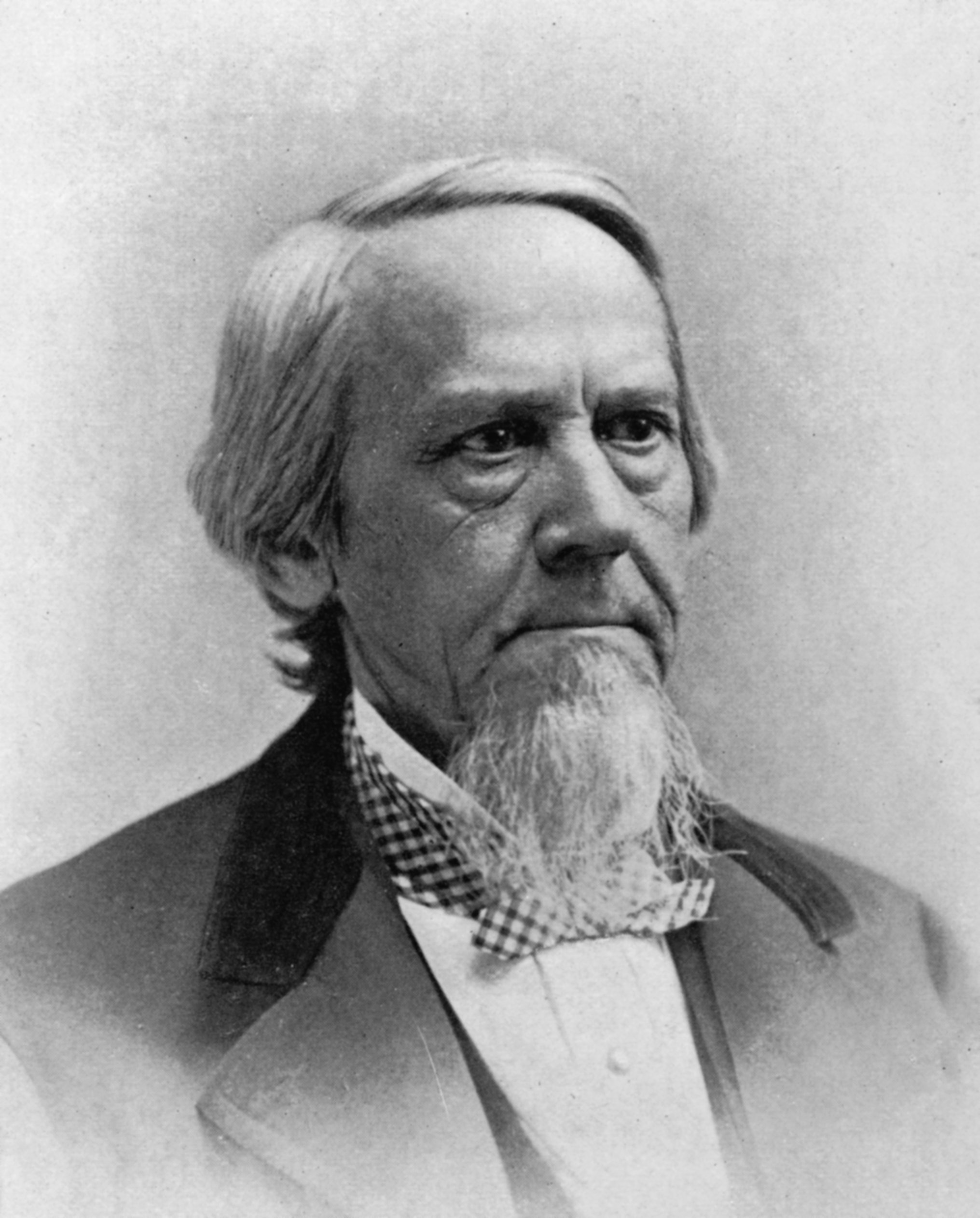
- Born: August 7, 1811; Willington, Connecticut, United States
- Died: August 15, 1889 (aged 78); New Haven, Connecticut, United States
- Education: Yale College
- Scientific career
- Fields: Mathematics, Terrestrial Magnetism
- Workplaces: Western Reserve College, New York University, Yale College

Elias Loomis (August 7, 1811 – August 15, 1889) was an American mathematician. He served as a professor of mathematics and natural philosophy at Western Reserve College (now Case Western Reserve University), the University of the City of New York and Yale University. During his tenure at Western Reserve College in 1838, he established the Loomis Observatory, currently the second oldest observatory in the United States.

== Life and work ==
Loomis Observatory, completed in 1838, is the oldest observatory in the United States still in its original location.

Loomis was born in Willington, Connecticut in 1811. He graduated at Yale College in 1830, was a tutor there for three years (1833–36), and then spent the next year in scientific investigation in Paris. On his return, Loomis served as professor of mathematics and natural philosophy for eight years (1836–44) at Western Reserve College in Hudson, Ohio, now Case Western Reserve University. During his tenure, he opened up the Loomis Observatory in 1838, currently the second oldest observatory in the United States. From 1844 to 1860 he held the professorship of natural philosophy and mathematics in the University of the City of New York, and in the latter year became professor of natural philosophy in Yale. Professor Loomis published (besides many papers in the American Journal of Science and in the Transactions of the American Philosophical Society) many textbooks on mathematics, including Analytical Geometry and of the Differential and Integral Calculus, published in 1835.

In 1859 Alexander Wylie, assistant director of London Missionary Press in Shanghai, in cooperation with fellow Chinese scholar Li Shanlan, translated Elias Loomis's book on Geometry, Differential and Integral Calculus into Chinese. The Chinese text was subsequently translated twice by Japanese scholars into Japanese and published in Japan. Loomis's writings thus played an important role in the transfer of analytical mathematical knowledge to the Far East.

== Great Auroral Exhibition of 1859 ==
In his memoir of Loomis, Hubert Anson Newton summarized Loomis's work on the historical Geomagnetic Storm of 1859.

Closely connected with terrestrial magnetism, and to be considered with it, is the Aurora Borealis. In the week that covered the end of August and the beginning of September, 1859, there occurred an exceedingly brilliant display of the Northern Lights. Believing that an exhaustive discussion of a single aurora promised to do more for the promotion of science than an imperfect study of an indefinite number of them, Professor Loomis undertook at once to collect and to collate accounts of this display. A large number of such accounts were secured from North America, from Europe, from Asia, and from places in the Southern Hemisphere; especially all the reports from the Smithsonian observers and correspondents, were placed in his hands by the Secretary, Professor Henry.

These observations and the discussions of them were given to the public during the following two years, in a series of nine papers in the American Journal of Science.

Few, if any, displays on record were as remarkable as was this one for brilliancy or for geographical extent. Certainly about no aurora have there been collected so many facts. The display continued for a week. The luminous region entirely encircled the North Pole of the earth. It extended on this continent on the 2d of September as far south, as Cuba, and to an unknown distance to the north. In altitude the bases of the columns of light were about fifty miles above the earth's surface, and the streamers shot up at times to a height of five hundred miles. Thus over a broad belt on both continents this large region above the lower atmosphere was filled with masses of luminous material. A display similar to this, and possibly of equal brilliancy, was at the same time witnessed in the Southern Hemisphere.

The nine papers were mainly devoted to the statements of observers. Professor Loomis, however, went on to collect facts about other auroras, and to make inductions from the whole of the material thus brought together. He showed that there was good reason for believing that not only was this display represented by a corresponding one in the Southern Hemisphere, but that all remarkable displays in either hemisphere are accompanied by corresponding ones in the other.

He showed also that all the principal phenomena of electricity were developed during the auroral display of 1859; that light was developed in passing from one conductor to another, that heat in poor conductors, that the peculiar electric shock to the animal system, the excitement of magnetism in irons, the deflection of the magnetic needle, the decomposition of chemical solutions, each and all were produced during the auroral storm, and evidently by its agency. There were also in America effects upon the telegraph that were entirely consistent with the assumption previously made by Walker for England, that currents of electricity moved from northeast to southwest across the country. From the observations of the motion of auroral beams, he showed that they also moved from north-northeast to south-southwest, there being thus a general correspondence in motion between the electrical currents and the motion of the beams.

The following are the nine papers published by Professor Loomis pertaining to the Geomagnetic Storm of 1859.

The great auroral exhibition of August 28 to September, 1859.
Am. Jour. Sci. (2), vol. 28, pp. 385–408. November, 1859.

The great auroral exhibition of August 28 to September 4, 1859—2nd article.
Am. Jour. Sci. (2), vol. 29, pp. 92–97. January, 1860.

The great auroral exhibition of August 28 to September 4, 1859—3rd article.
Am. Jour. Sci. (2), vol. 29, pp. 249–266. February, 1860.

The great auroral exhibition of August 28 to September 4, 1859—4th article.
Am. Jour. Sci. (2), vol. 29, pp. 386–399. May, 1860.

The great auroral exhibition of August 28 to September 4, 1859, and the geographical distribution of auroras and thunder storms—5th article.
Am. Jour. Sci. (2), vol. 30, pp. 79–100. July, 1860.

The great auroral exhibition of August 28 to September 4, 1859—6th article.
(Selected from the Smithsonian papers.)
Am. Jour. Sci. (2), vol. 30, pp. 339–361. November, 1860.

The great auroral exhibition of August 28 to September 4, 1859—7th article.
Am. Jour. Sci. (2), vol. 32, pp. 71–84. July, 1861.

On the great auroral exhibition of August 28 to September 4, 1859, and auroras generally—8th article.
Am. Jour. Sci. (2), vol. 32, pp. 318–335. September, 1861.

On electrical currents circulating near the earth's surface and their connection with the phenomena of the aurora polaris—9th article.
Am. Jour. Sci. (2), vol. 34. pp. 34–45. July, 1862.
(On the action of electrical currents and the motion of auroral beams.)

As part of a 2006 review of the Geomagnetic Storm of 1859, M. A. Shea and D. F. Smart edited a compendium of eight articles published by Elias Loomis in the American Journal of Science from 1859 to 1861. The ninth and final paper was omitted and not referenced. Of the eleven pages in the ninth paper, only half a page deals with the great auroral exhibition of 1859, previously reported by Loomis, while the bulk of the paper deals with auroral events predating 1859.

In the Compendium, for the 5th article in the series, the section on thunderstorms totaling six pages, is omitted with footnotes documenting the removal by the editors. In the citation to the 5th article the page range is given as 79–94, the correct range is 79–100.

The citations for the 3rd and 4th articles gives the page ranges as 249–265 and 386–397; the correct values are 249–266 and 386–399, but the content is complete for both articles in the Compendium.

In a November 21, 1861, paper to the Royal Society Balfour Stewart acknowledged the work of Professor E. Loomis.

It is unnecessary to enter into further particulars regarding this meteor, as the description of it given by observations at places widely apart have been collected together by Professor E. Loomis, and published in a series of papers communicated to the American Journal of Science and Arts. I shall only add that, both from the European, the American, and the Australian accounts, there appear to have been two great displays, each commencing at nearly the same absolute time, throughout the globe, —the first on the evening of 28 August, and the second on the early morning of 2 September, Greenwich time.

=== Great Auroral Exhibition of 1859, Other Reports ===
Reports Associated With the 28 August, 1859, Geomagnetic Storm

Balfour Stewart reported that a large magnetic storm began at 22:30 GMT on the evening of August 28, 1859, as measured by self-recording magnetometer at the Kew Observatory.

- THE AURORA BOREALIS.; THE BRILLIANT DISPLAY ON SUNDAY NIGHT. PHENOMENA CONNECTED WITH THE EVENT.
  Mr. Meriam's Observations on the Aurora—E. M. Picks Up a Piece of the Auroral Light.
  The Aurora as Seen Elsewhere—Remarkable Electrical Effects.;
  The New York Times, August 30, 1859, Tuesday; Page 1, 3087 words

The New York Times report on 30 August, 1859, on the magnetic storm of August 28, 1859, was on page one, above the fold, upper right corner and two full columns in length. This was a major news story for that date. The later reports on the magnetic storm and auroral displays associated with the Carrington Solar Flare did not enjoy the same level of coverage, even though some of the displays may have been more spectacular given the timing of the second storm close after the 28 August storm.

Reports Associated With the Carrington White Light Solar Flare Geomagnetic Storm

Balfour Stewart reported that the magnetic storm from the Carrington solar flare began at 05:00 GMT on the morning of September 2, 1859, as measured by the self-recording magnetometer at the Kew Observatory. This was equivalent to approximately midnight 00:00 EST in New York City. In all areas of the United States, not obscured by clouds, viewing conditions would have been ideal while the magnetic storm was at maximum intensity. Note that some locations in the Western United States could have reported events for late in the evening of September 1, 1859.

- AURORA AUSTRALIS.; Magnificent Display on Friday Morning.
  Mr. Merlam's Opinions on the Bareul Light—One of his Friends Finds a Place of the Aurora on his Lion-corp.
  The Aurural Display in Boston.;
  The New York Times, September 3, 1859, Saturday; Page 4, 1150 words

The New York Times report from Boston is of particular note because it may provide enough information to calculate the minimum illumination generated by the aurora.

The Auroral Display in Boston
Boston, Friday, Sept. 2
There was another display on the aurora last night, so brilliant that at about one o'clock ordinary print could be read by the light. The effect continued through this forenoon considerably affecting the working of the telegraph lines. The auroral currents from east to west were so regular that the operators on the Eastern lines were able to hold communication and transmit messages over the line between this city and Portland, the usual batteries being discontinued from the wire. The same effects were experienced upon the Cape Cod and other lines.

One o'clock Boston time on Friday September 2, would have been 6:00 GMT and the self-recording magnetograph at the Kew Observatory was recording the geomagnetic storm, which was then one hour old, at its full intensity.

- AURORAL PHENOMENA.; Remarkable Effect of the Aurora Upon the Telegraph Wires.;
  The New York Times, September 5, 1859, Monday; Page 2, 1683 words

Reports Associated With Both Geomagnetic Storms

- History, Theory, and Practice of the Electric Telegraph
  By George Bartlett Prescott (1860); 468 pages

In George Bartlett Prescott's book, Chapter XIX on Terrestrial Magnetism (pp. 305–332) contains multiple reports of Auroral events disrupting telegraph communications, the times for which are in good agreement with the times reports by Balfour Stewart for the two magnetic storms between August 28 and September 2, 1859. Detailed descriptions of the events and stations involved are provided in the narratives.

- The Telegraph in America: Its Founders, Promoters and Noted Men
  By James D. Reid (1879); 846 pages;
- The Telegraph in America: Its Founders, Promoters and Noted Men
  By James D. Reid (2015); 846 pages;

== Writings ==
See pages i – xxii of The American Journal of Science (1890, volume 39, number 234) for a list of Loomis's publications. Among these are the following:

- The recent progress of astronomy; especially in the United States (1850)
- Elements of Analytical Geometry and of the Differential and Integral Calculus (1851)
- The Elements of Geology Adapted to the Use of Schools and Colleges (1852)
- Elements of Natural Philosophy Designed for Academies and High Schools (1858)
- An Introduction to Practical Astronomy With a Collection of Astronomical Tables (1860)
- Elements of Geometry and Conic Sections (1861)
- Elements of Plane and Spherical Trigonometry (1862)
- Tables of Logarithms of Numbers and of Sines and Tangents (1862)
- A Treatise on Algebra (1868)
- A treatise on meteorology : with a collection of meteorological tables (1868)
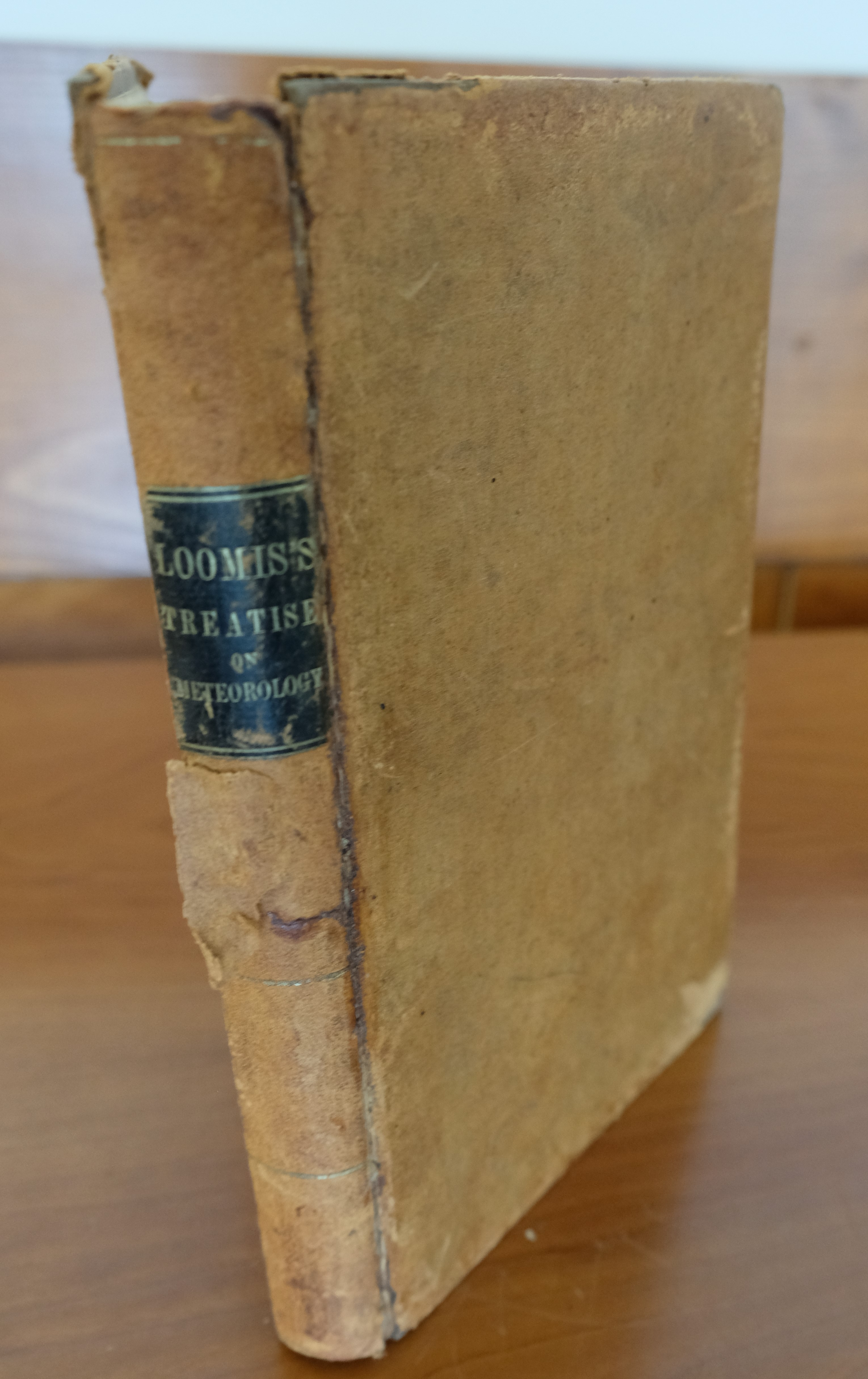
1877 copy of "A treatise on meteorology: with a collection of meteorological tables"

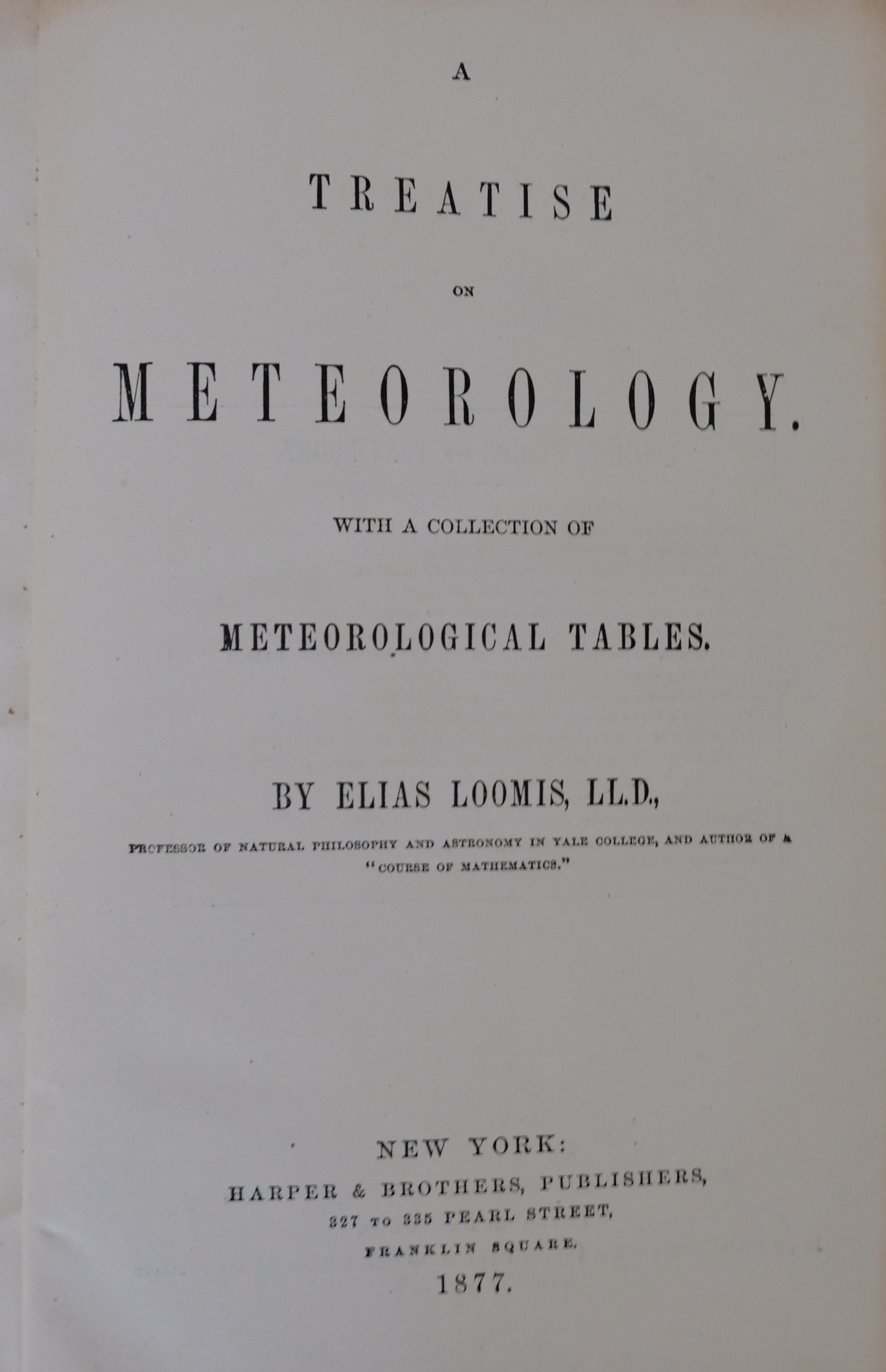
Title page to an 1877 copy of "A treatise on meteorology: with a collection of meteorological tables

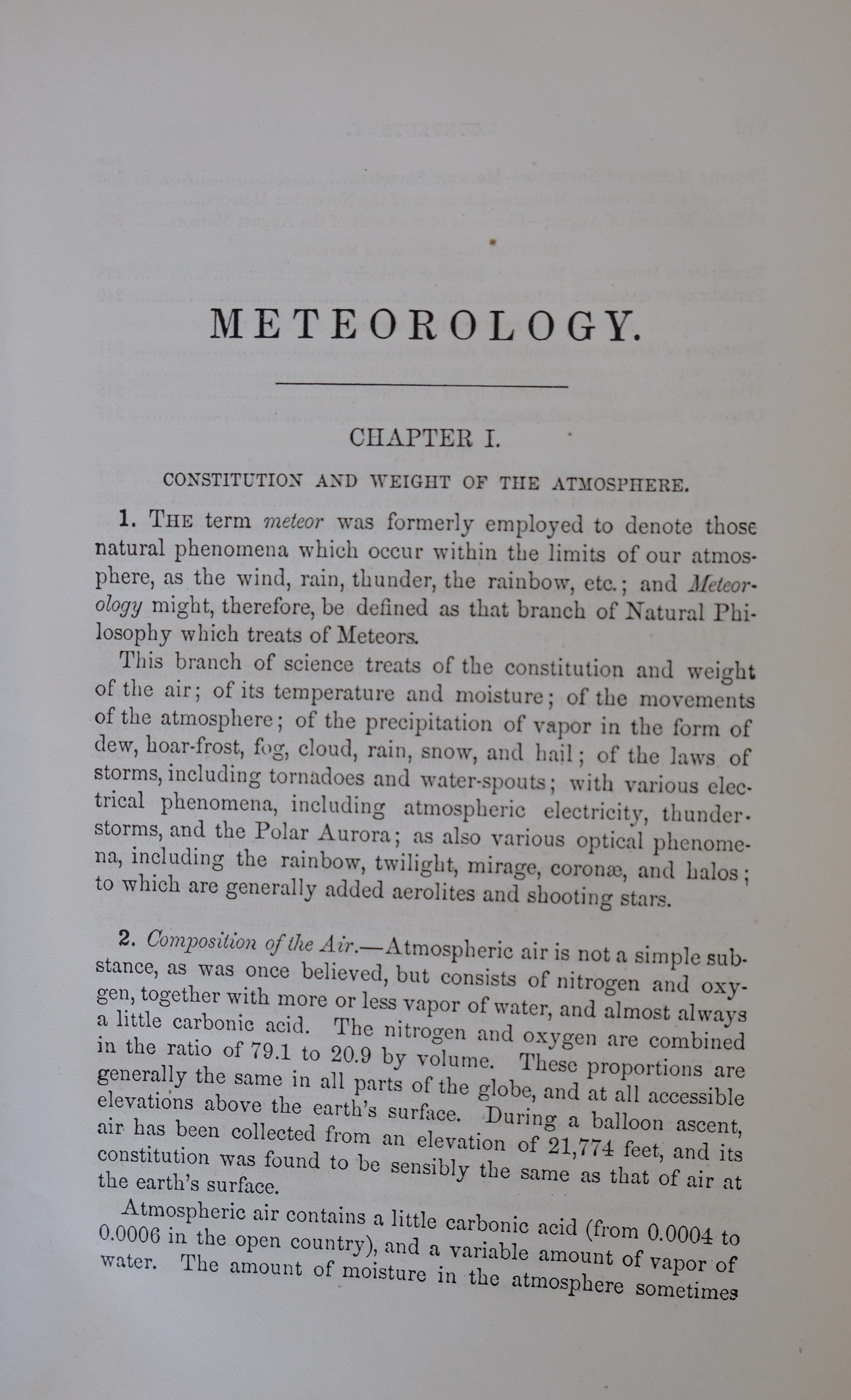
First page of "A treatise on meteorology: with a collection of meteorological tables

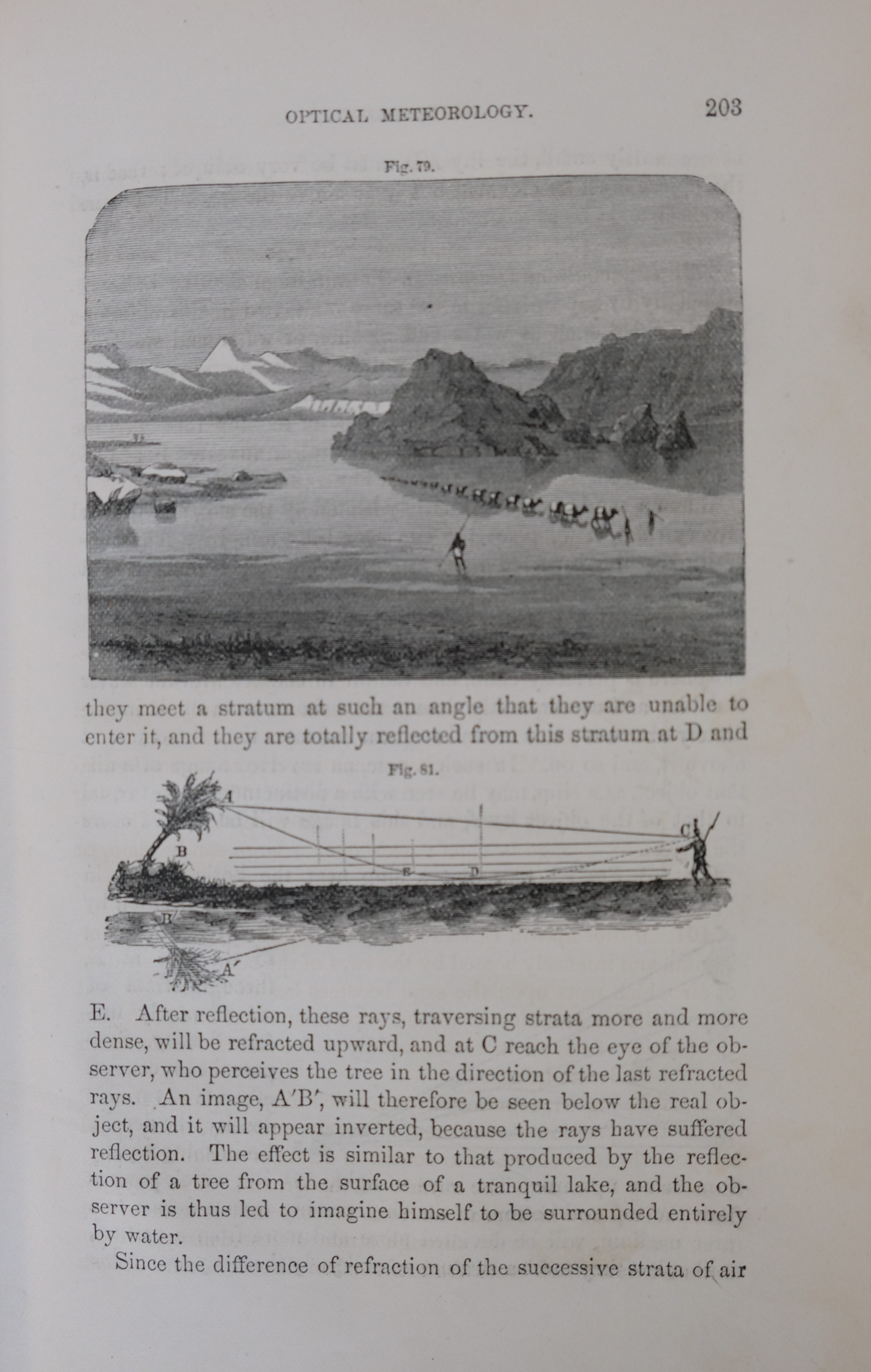
Figure from "A treatise on meteorology: with a collection of meteorological tables
