= Hopkins Observatory =

Observatory in Massachusetts, US

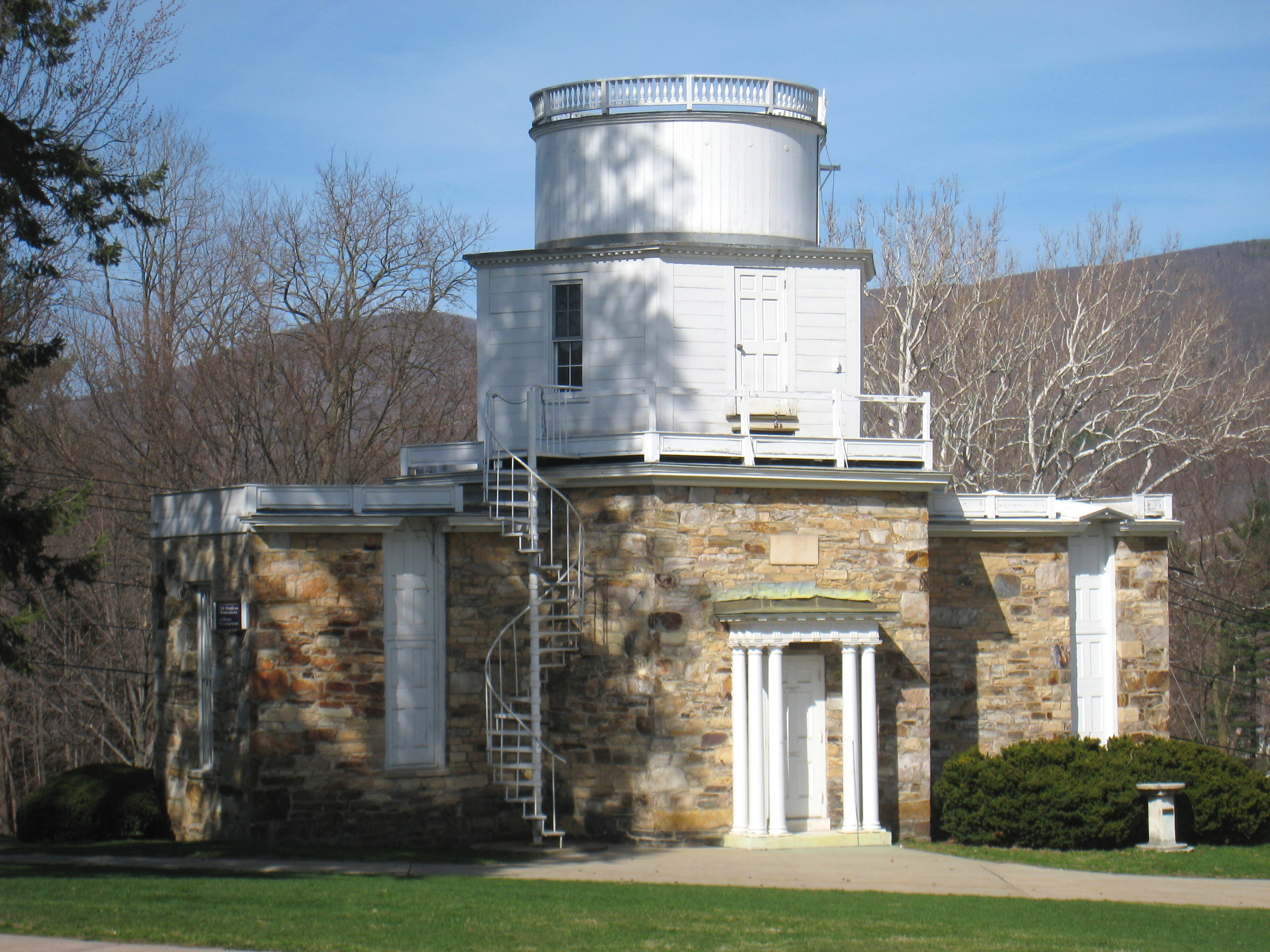
- Hopkins Observatory.
- Alternative names: Milham Planetarium
- Named after: Albert Hopkins
- Organization: Williams College
- Location: Williamstown, Massachusetts, USA
- Coordinates: 42°42′42″N 73°12′06″W
- Altitude: ? m (? ft)
- Established: 1838
- Website: Hopkins Observatory

Telescopes
- Main telescope: 7" refractor
- Related media on Commons

Hopkins Observatory is an astronomical observatory owned and operated by Williams College in Williamstown, Massachusetts (USA). Constructed in 1838 by Albert Hopkins, it is the oldest extant observatory in the United States.

The observatory dates to 1834 when Prof. Albert Hopkins traveled to England to obtain astronomical equipment. His students constructed the observatory 1836-1838 in the center of the quad. It was moved once in 1908 and again to its present location in 1961, where it now serves as a planetarium. Today's building still contains the original transit, regulator with mercury-compensated pendulum, and rule.

The museum's second director, Truman Henry Safford, was a calculating prodigy. In 1852 the firm of Alvan Clark (Cambridge, Massachusetts) built a 7" refracting telescope, which was restored for the observatory's sesquicentennial. In 1963 the planetarium projector was installed and named in memory of Willis Milham, professor of astronomy 1901-1942. The observatory's side rooms have become the Mehlin Museum of Astronomy in memory of Theodore Mehlin, professor of astronomy 1942-1971.

== See also ==
- List of astronomical observatories
