= James Ellsworth (industrialist) =

American industrialist (1849–1925)

James W. Ellsworth
- James Ellsworth, October 1897
- Born: James William Ellsworth; 13 October 1849; Hudson, Ohio, US
- Died: 2 June 1925 (aged 75); Florence, Italy
- Occupation: Industrialist
- Children: 2; including Lincoln Ellsworth

James William Ellsworth (October 13, 1849 – June 2, 1925) was an American industrialist and a Pennsylvania coal mine owner. The coal town of Ellsworth, Pennsylvania is named after him. He also served as president of the Caxton Club and the Jekyll Island Club.

Ellsworth married Eva Francis Butler on November 4, 1874. They had two children, Lincoln and Claire, before his wife died in 1888 at the age of 36. In 1895, Ellsworth married Julia Clarke Fincke, who died in 1921 at the age of 74.

In 1907, following the completion of the Monongahela Railway, Ellsworth sold the coal mines to Bethlehem Steel and purchased the Villa Palmieri, Fiesole, in Florence, Italy, in part to further his interests as a collector of art and rare coins.

His son, Lincoln Ellsworth, was a pilot in the Amundsen-Ellsworth Polar Flying Expedition of May 1925 which Ellsworth sponsored. In 1925, Ellsworth died of bronchial pneumonia at his villa near Florence, while awaiting the news of his son's safety.
