= Goshen Historic District =

Goshen Historic District may refer to:

- Goshen Historic District (Goshen, Connecticut), listed on the National Register of Historic Places (NRHP) in Goshen, Connecticut
- West Goshen Historic District, also listed on the NRHP in Goshen, Connecticut
- Goshen Historic District (Goshen, Indiana), listed on the NRHP in Elkhart County, Indiana
- Goshenville Historic District, in East Goshen Township, Pennsylvania, listed on the NRHP in Chester County, Pennsylvania
