= Hudson, Ohio =

- City
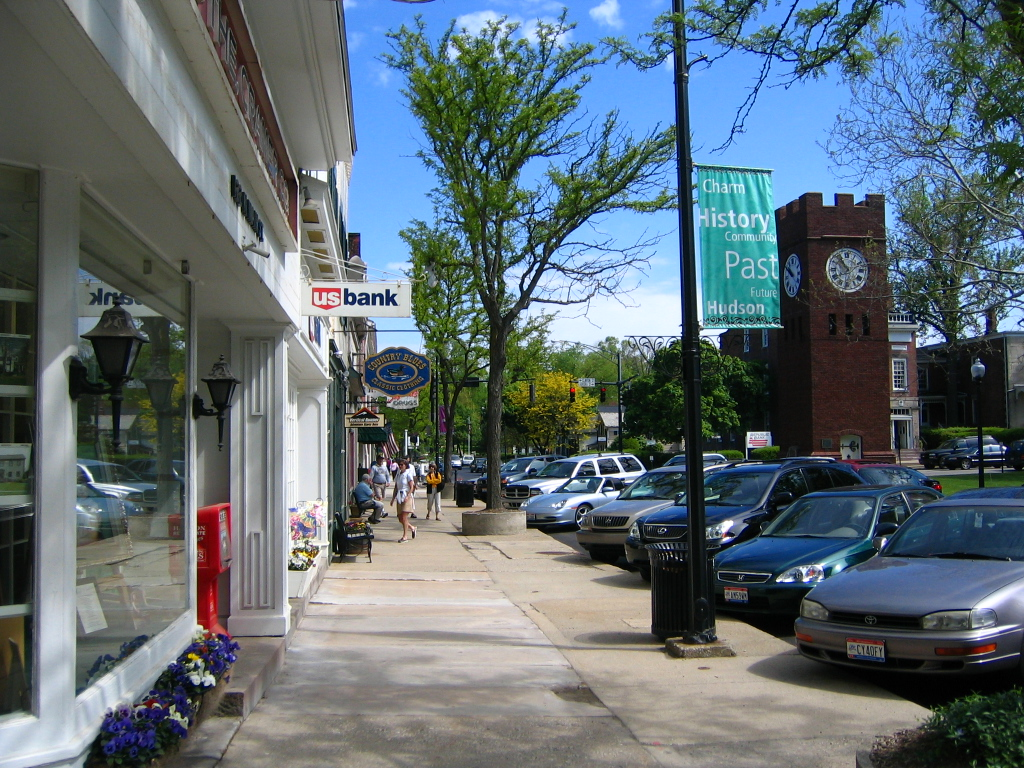
- North Main Street, Hudson Historic District

- Flag
- Interactive map of Hudson, Ohio
- Location within Ohio Location within the United States
- Coordinates: 41°14′40″N 81°26′27″W
- Country: United States
- State: Ohio
- County: Summit
- Settled: 1799
- Incorporated: 1837
- Village/Township Merger: 1994
- Founder: David Hudson
- Named for: David Hudson

Government
  - Type: Council–manager

Area
  - Total: 25.88 sq mi (67.04 km^{2})
  - Land: 25.63 sq mi (66.37 km^{2})
  - Water: 0.26 sq mi (0.67 km^{2})
- Elevation: 1,066 ft (325 m)

Population (2020)
  - Total: 23,110
  - Density: 901.9/sq mi (348.21/km^{2})
- Demonym: Hudsonite
- Time zone: UTC-5 (EST)
  - Summer (DST): UTC-4 (EDT)
- ZIP code: 44236
- Area codes: 330, 234
- FIPS code: 39-36651
- GNIS feature ID: 2394437
- Website: hudson.oh.us

Hudson is a city in northern Summit County, Ohio, United States. The population was 23,110 at the 2020 census. It is a suburban community in the Akron metropolitan area. John Brown made his first public vow to destroy slavery here and the city later became part of the Underground Railroad. The Village of Hudson and Hudson Township were formerly two separate governing entities that merged in 1994.

== History ==
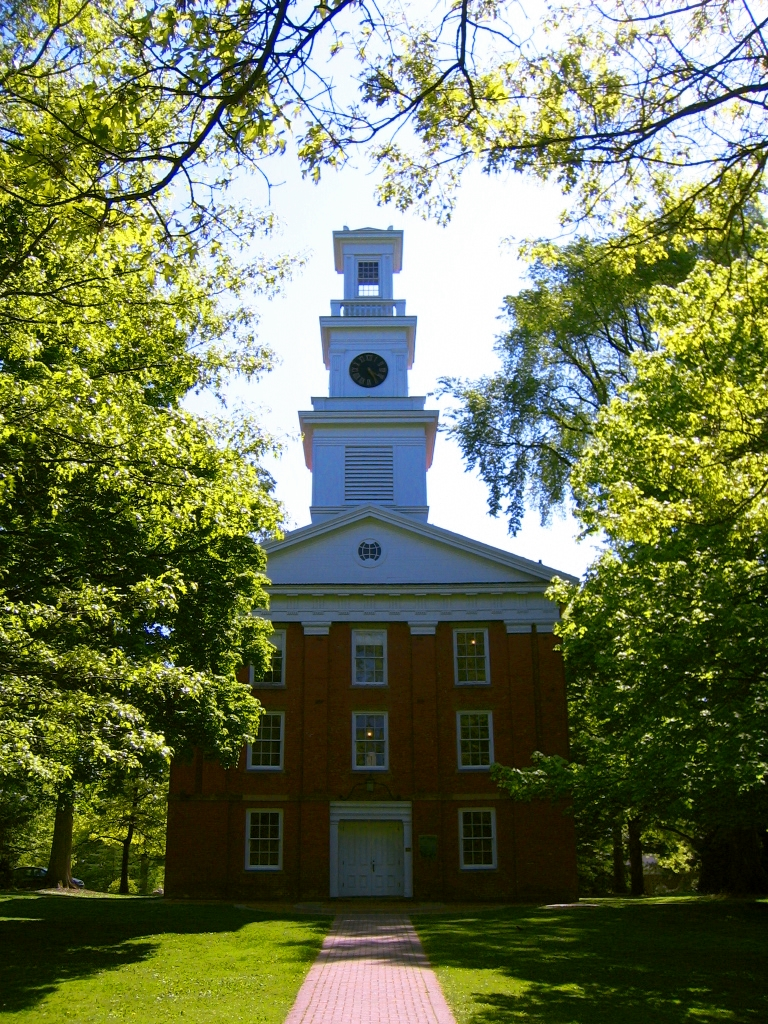
The chapel of Western Reserve Academy

The city is named after its founder, David Hudson, who settled there from Goshen, Connecticut, in 1799, when it was part of the Connecticut Western Reserve. The village of Hudson, located in the center of Hudson Township, was incorporated in 1837. In Hudson, David Hudson built the first log house in Summit County, Ohio. There is a marker at the intersection of Baldwin Street and North Main Street (Ohio State Route 91), on the right when traveling east on Baldwin Street. The marker is embedded in the west face of the boulder.

Hudson, which had a distinctly New England character from its early settlers, was the home of Western Reserve College and Preparatory School, founded in 1826 by David Hudson among others. It was spoken of as the "Yale of the West". The college moved to Cleveland in 1882 and later, as Western Reserve University, merged with the Case Institute of Technology to form the modern Case Western Reserve University. The Yale-inspired red brick buildings are now the Western Reserve Academy. The Loomis Observatory was built in 1838 and is the oldest observatory in the U.S. still in its original location.

The Cleveland and Pittsburgh Railroad began service to Hudson in 1852. In 1861, President-elect Abraham Lincoln spoke to about 6,000 people for 2 to 3 minutes from the last train car at the old Hudson Depot, near the south end of College Street. The railroad ended passenger service at Hudson in 1965. A former train station (built in the 1910s) that was located near the intersection of West Streetsboro and Library Streets was demolished in 2013.

East of Morse Road, there is an unfinished Clinton Air Line Railroad bridge (over Hurricane Creek near the power line from Morse Road to W. Prescott Road).

There was a fire on the west side of Hudson's Main Street in 1892. The fire destroyed the buildings between Park Lane and Clinton Street. A. W. Lockhart's saloon and the Mansion House [Hotel] burned. The Hudson-born Pennsylvania coal mine owner James Ellsworth assisted in the rebuilding of Main Street after the street had been destroyed by fire in 1903. Ellsworth also refinanced the bankrupt Western Reserve Academy, housed on the former campus of Western Reserve College, which had been closed from 1903 until 1916.

In 1882, Gustave H. Grimm established the G.H. Grimm Manufacturing Company to build and sell corrugated tin-pan evaporators for use in maple syrup production. That area, now called "The Evaporator Works", is on the south of Ravenna Street and just east of Ohio Route 91.

The Hudson Clock Tower was built in 1912 by James Ellsworth who was born in Hudson in 1849. The original clock movement was supplied by the E. Howard Clock Company of Boston. The energy from 3000-pound weights powered the movement of the clocks and Westminster chimes. The town marshall was responsible for entering the tower every few days and winding (lifting) the weights.

Lincoln Ellsworth was the son of James Ellsworth. Lincoln Ellsworth is the only Hudsonite on a U.S. postage stamp. The Ellsworth Mountains are named after Lincoln Ellsworth. Lincoln was born in Chicago and lived in Hudson when he was a child. Lincoln was awarded two Congressional Gold Medals.

In 1941, John F. Morse, Jr. establish the Morse Instrument Company (later renamed Morse Controls), in Hudson. The company manufactured aviation, automotive, and maritime devices, and by 1969, employed over 600 individuals, with annual sales of $12 million. The plant closed in 2020.

From 1957 until the late 1980s, General Motors had a factory of almost one thousand workers in Hudson that built crawler tractor earth-moving equipment. The factory was beside and east of Ohio State Route 91 and it was south of Terex Road. The original 1958 factory had 660,000 square feet. In 1961, GM added 340,000 square feet for a total of 1 million square feet of factory. In 1970, GM renamed their earth-moving equipment division as Terex. Currently Jo-Ann Stores uses most of the former GM factory. Hudson had an airport from mid-1920s until 1957, known as the Hudson Mid-City Airport, near the former General Motors Euclid Division.

On November 28, 1973, a large area of the village, "roughly bounded by College, Streetsboro, S. Main, and Baldwin" streets, was listed on the National Register of Historic Places as the Hudson Historic District. The historic district was expanded on October 10, 1989, to also include the area "roughly bounded by Hudson St., Old Orchard Dr., Aurora St., Oviatt St., Streetsboro St., and College St. to Aurora (street)". In addition to the Hudson Historic District, there are several additional properties in Hudson listed on the Register. The City of Hudson came about in 1994 when voters approved the merger of Hudson Township and Hudson Village, which had previously been two separate governing entities.

In July 2003, Hudson received over 17 inches (430 mm) of rain from three storm events within 24 hours. Hudson had flood damage within all its three watersheds ... Mud Brook, Brandywine Creek and Tinker's Creek. The Brandywine Creek Watershed experienced the most flood damage in 2003. Two men drowned in an underground parking garage of a condominium complex on July 21, 2003. State Routes 91 and 303 flooded where the highways dip low to pass under the train tracks and the highways were closed by 7:40 PM on July 21.

=== An abolitionist center ===
Ohio's Western Reserve "was probably the most intensely antislavery section of the country". Hudson, with the Reserve's first college, was for a time its intellectual capital. The founders of Hudson were abolitionists, although founder David Hudson favored the soon-to-be-discarded strategy of "colonization": sending free Blacks "back to Africa". Another founder, Owen Brown, father of John Brown, also from Connecticut, was a fervent abolitionist. The latter, who arguably did more to end slavery in the United States than any other person, grew up and was educated in Hudson from 1805 to 1825. There is a marker at the site of his family's home, at the intersection of Ravenna and South Main Streets.

There is also a historical marker at the location of the first meetinghouse of the First Congregational Church, at East Main and Church Streets, reading: "In August, 1835, church members unanimously adopted a resolution declaring that slavery is 'a direct violation of the law of Almighty God.' At a November 1837 prayer meeting, church member and anti-slavery leader John Brown made his first public vow to destroy slavery."

Thousands of fugitive slaves, heading for freedom in Canada, passed through Hudson; it was a stop on the Underground Railroad. Owen Brown was very active in assisting the fugitives. As of 2019, 21 locations in and around Hudson associated with the Underground Railroad have been identified. and in 1992 there appeared a book by James Caccamo, Hudson and the Underground Railroad.

Hudson's period of anti-slavery leadership ended in the early 1830s. Beriah Green, the lone professor of theology at the college, was influenced by William Lloyd Garrison's new newspaper, The Liberator, and his Thoughts on African Colonization. He preached four fiery anti-slavery sermons, which so inflamed the college that nothing else was being discussed, the president said, and the town was torn apart. Green, expecting to be fired, left to become president of the Oneida Institute, on condition Blacks be admitted on the same terms as whites. Oneida, near Utica, New York, replaced Hudson as the nation's leading abolitionist center.

== Geography ==
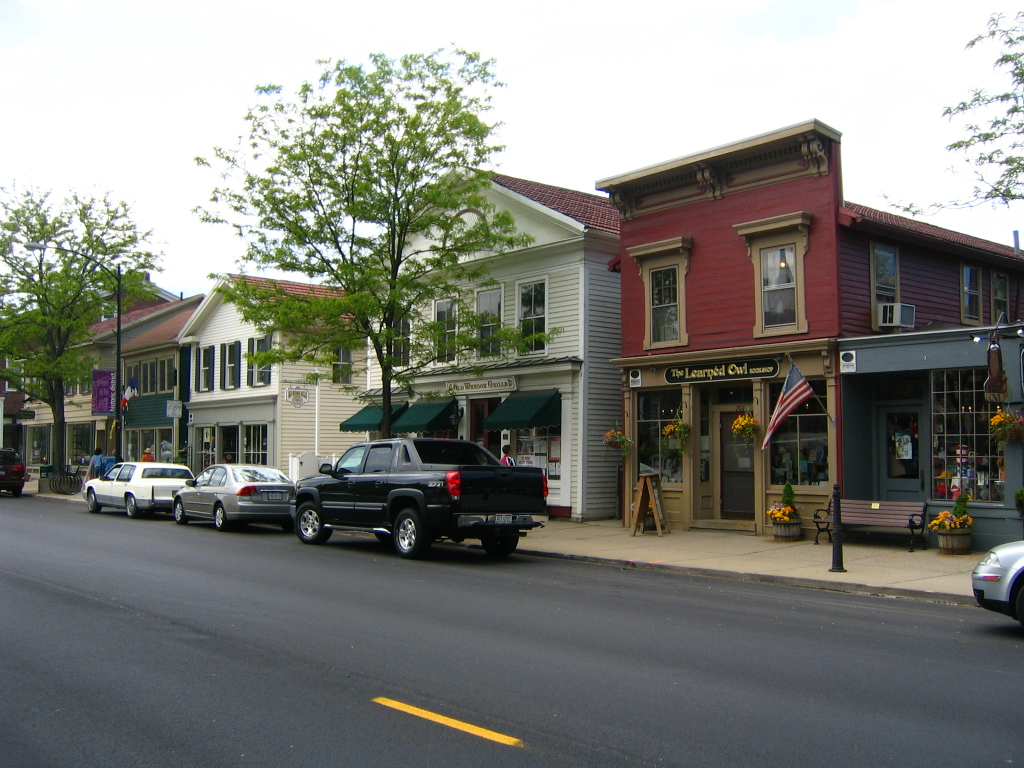
North Main Street

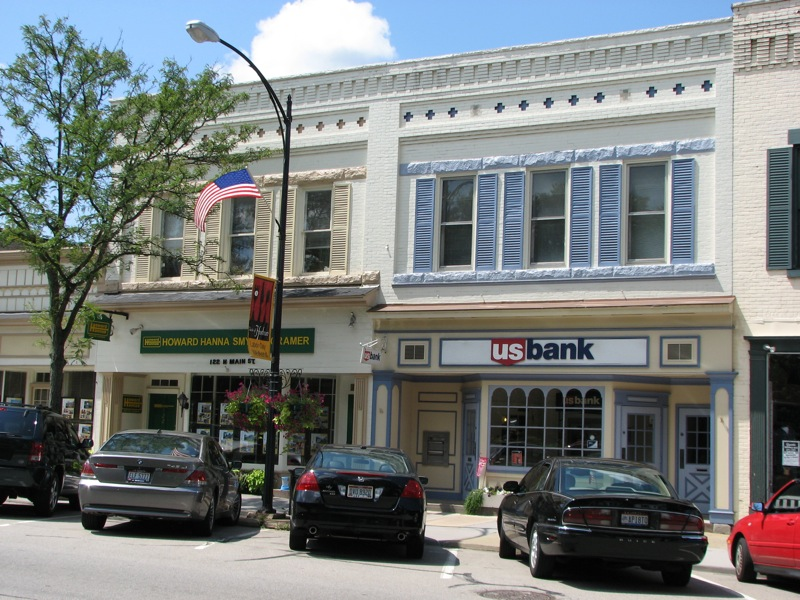
Howard Hanna and US Bank

Hudson is located in northeastern Summit County. According to the United States Census Bureau, the city has a total area of 25.87 square miles (67.00 km^{2}), of which 25.60 square miles (66.30 km^{2}) is land and 0.27 square miles (0.70 km^{2}) is water.

=== Neighboring communities ===
Hudson's neighbors are, starting at the northern corporate boundary and proceeding clockwise:

- Northfield Center Township (meets at Hudson's northwest corner)
- Macedonia (western quarter of Hudson's northern boundary)
- Twinsburg Township (remainder of Hudson's northern boundary)
- Aurora (meets at northeast corner)
- Streetsboro (entire eastern boundary)
- Franklin Township (meets at southeast corner)
- Stow (entire southern boundary)
- Cuyahoga Falls (meets at southwest corner)
- Boston Township (southern third of Hudson's western boundary)
- Boston Heights (remainder of western boundary)

=== Watersheds ===
Hudson's surface water flows into five major watersheds. The three most prominent are Brandywine Creek, Mud Brook, and Tinkers Creek. A small part of the western edge of town drains into the Cuyahoga River, and the southeastern corner of the city drains into Fish Creek.

== Demographics ==
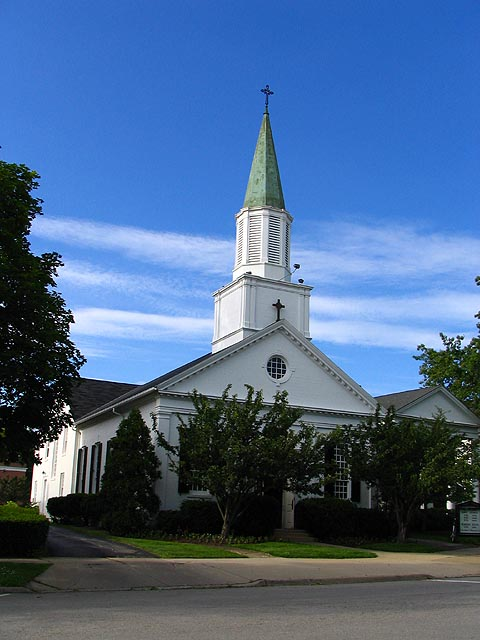
Christ Church Episcopal in downtown Hudson

Historical population
Census	Pop.	Note	%±
1870	868		—
1890	1,143		—
1900	933		−18.4%
1910	1,031		10.5%
1920	1,134		10.0%
1930	1,324		16.8%
1940	1,417		7.0%
1950	1,538		8.5%
1960	2,438		58.5%
1970	3,933		61.3%
1980	4,612		17.3%
1990	5,159		11.9%
2000	22,439		334.9%
2010	22,262		−0.8%
2020	23,110		3.8%

Of the city's population over the age of 25, 68.0% held a bachelor's degree or higher. According to a 2007 estimate, the median income for a household in the city was $112,740, and the median income for a family was $128,727. Males had a median income of $87,169 versus $38,226 for females. The per capita income for the city was $40,915. About 1.3% of families and 1.7% of the population were below the poverty line, including 2.2% of those under age 18 and 2.0% of those age 65 or over.

Note: Historical Population figures before 2000 are for the former Village of Hudson only and do not include the former Hudson Township.

=== 2020 census ===
As of the 2020 census, Hudson had a population of 23,110, a median age of 44.2 years, 25.7% of residents under the age of 18, and 18.3% of residents 65 years of age or older. For every 100 females there were 96.1 males, and for every 100 females age 18 and over there were 94.8 males age 18 and over.

95.3% of residents lived in urban areas, while 4.7% lived in rural areas.

There were 8,049 households in Hudson, of which 38.4% had children under the age of 18 living in them. Of all households, 74.1% were married-couple households, 8.4% were households with a male householder and no spouse or partner present, and 15.1% were households with a female householder and no spouse or partner present. About 15.6% of all households were made up of individuals and 9.7% had someone living alone who was 65 years of age or older.

There were 8,379 housing units, of which 3.9% were vacant. The homeowner vacancy rate was 0.8% and the rental vacancy rate was 5.7%.

Racial composition as of the 2020 census
Race	Number	Percent
White	20,421	88.4%
Black or African American	299	1.3%
American Indian and Alaska Native	20	0.1%
Asian	1,128	4.9%
Native Hawaiian and Other Pacific Islander	2	0.0%
Some other race	115	0.5%
Two or more races	1,125	4.9%
Hispanic or Latino (of any race)	560	2.4%

=== 2010 census ===
As of the 2010 census there were 22,262 people, 7,620 households, and 6,301 families residing in the city. The population density was 869.6 inhabitants per square mile (335.8/km^{2}). There were 8,002 housing units at an average density of 312.6 per square mile (120.7/km^{2}). The racial makeup of the city was 92.7% White, 1.3% African American, 0.1% Native American, 4.3% Asian, 0.3% from other races, and 1.3% from two or more races. Hispanic or Latino of any race were 1.7% of the population.

There were 7,620 households, of which 43.2% had children under the age of 18 living with them, 74.9% were married couples living together, 5.9% had a female householder with no husband present, 1.9% had a male householder with no wife present, and 17.3% were non-families. 15.3% of all households were made up of individuals, and 8.4% had someone living alone who was 65 years of age or older. The average household size was 2.87 and the average family size was 3.21.

The median age in the city was 42.5 years. 30.1% of residents were under the age of 18; 5.5% were between the ages of 18 and 24; 18.5% were from 25 to 44; 34% were from 45 to 64; and 11.8% were 65 years of age or older. The gender makeup of the city was 49.1% male and 50.9% female.

=== 2000 census ===
As of the 2000 census, there were 22,439 people, 7,357 households, and 6,349 families residing in the city. The population density was 876.9 inhabitants per square mile (338.6/km^{2}). There were 7,636 housing units at an average density of 298.4 per square mile (115.2/km^{2}). The racial makeup of the city was 94.65% White, 2.82% Asian, 1.48% African American, 0.09% Native American, 0.20% from other races, and 0.75% from two or more races. Hispanic or Latino of any race were 0.82% of the population.

There were 7,357 households, out of which 49.5% had children under the age of 18 living with them, 79.7% were married couples living together, 5.1% had a female householder with no husband present, and 13.7% were non-families. 12.3% of all households were made up of individuals, and 6.5% had someone living alone who was 65 years of age or older. The average household size was 3.01 and the average family size was 3.30.

In the city the population was spread out, with 33.5% under the age of 18, 4.1% from 18 to 24, 25.4% from 25 to 44, 27.7% from 45 to 64, and 9.4% who were 65 years of age or older. The median age was 39 years. For every 100 females, there were 98.5 males. For every 100 females age 18 and over, there were 93.0 males.

=== Religion ===
There are many churches and other places of worship in Hudson. There are several Christian denominations present, including the Eastern Orthodox, Episcopal Church, United Church of Christ, Lutheran, Christian Science, Presbyterian, United Methodist, Anglican, and Roman Catholic, and non-denominational congregations as well as a Jewish temple.

== Economy ==
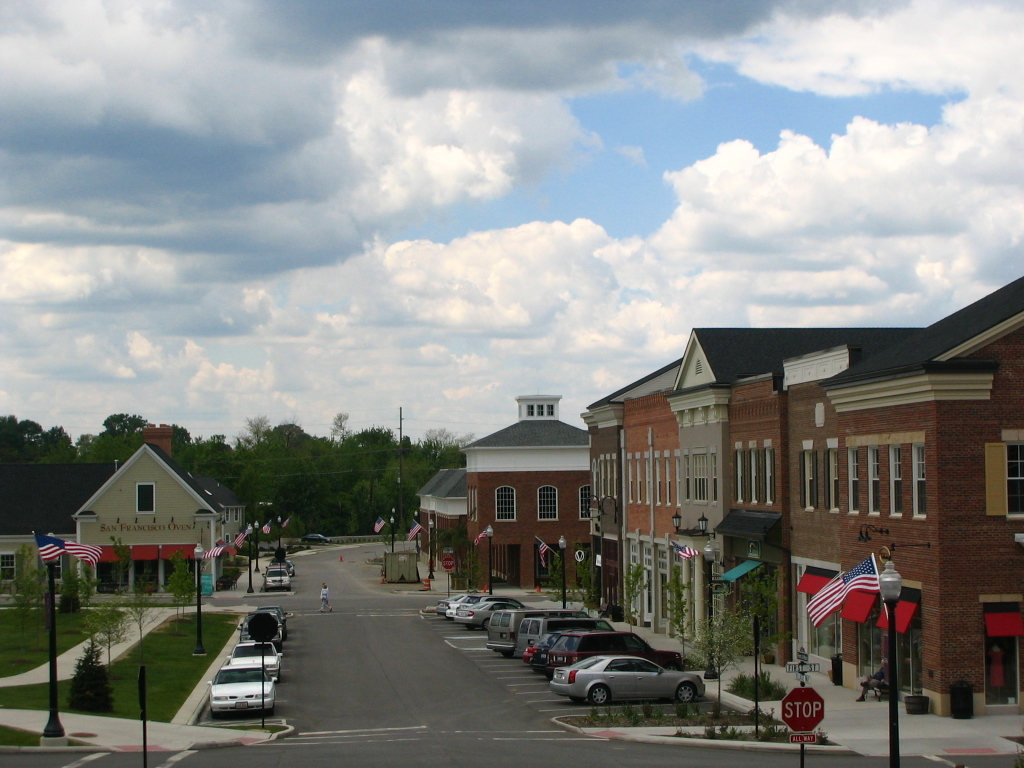
The "First and Main" shopping district

In November 2002, Hudson was the first community in the U.S. to launch a citywide electronic gift card. The card was introduced by the Hudson Chamber of Commerce to help stimulate and keep shopping dollars with the independent merchants in town.

=== Commercial ===
- Jo-Ann Stores had its corporate headquarters in Hudson. Jo-Ann went through a bankruptcy and complete liquidation, shuttering all operations including the corporate office in Hudson.
- Allstate Insurance Company established a call center/data center in Hudson in 1971. In 1991, it expanded the Hudson facility and now employs more than 1,300.

=== Retail ===
- Most of Hudson's retail outlets are located in concentrated areas. Most notable are the two downtown blocks of historic buildings located on North Main Street. The original center of business in Hudson, the stores and offices located "downtown" still stand today in continued commercial use.
- In 1962, the first part of the Hudson Plaza shopping center opened on West Streetsboro Street. It has always been anchored by the Acme grocery store, which moved there from its former location on North Main Street. Expansions of the plaza continued through the 1990s. A unique McDonald's restaurant, resembling a house, opened in 1985. The original building, housing Acme, was extensively renovated in 2000 and again in 2023-24.
- 2004 marked the opening of First & Main, a mixed-use development just west of North Main Street. The Hudson Library & Historical Society relocated there in 2005.

== Parks and recreation ==
The Hudson Park Board oversees more than one thousand acres (4 km^{2}) of parkland in the city. The most prominent property is Hudson Springs Park, which has a 50-acre lake open to kayaks, canoes and small motorized boats. Boat storage is available to residents only for an annual fee. The lake is stocked with fish and encircled by walking trails based around a 1.8 mile loop that ventures into the woods that stretch along a large portion of the lake. The park also has a disc golf course, docks, sand volleyball pit and permanent corn-hole boards (bring your own bean bags). Cascade Park, Barlow Farm Park, and Colony Park are large neighborhood parks used for sports and general family recreation. Other properties, such as Doc's Woods, MacLaren Woods, Trumbull Woods, and Bicentennial Woods, are kept as forested nature preserves. The first Hudson Park, Wildlife Woods, is actually located west of the city in the Cuyahoga Valley National Park.

== Government ==
The city is governed by a seven-member city council. There are four council representatives representing the four wards in Hudson, and three representatives at-large. Hudson has a council-manager government. At present, the Council President is Dr. Michael Bird. The current City Manager is Thomas J. Sheridan. The Mayor's office is held by Jeffrey Anzevino.

== Education ==
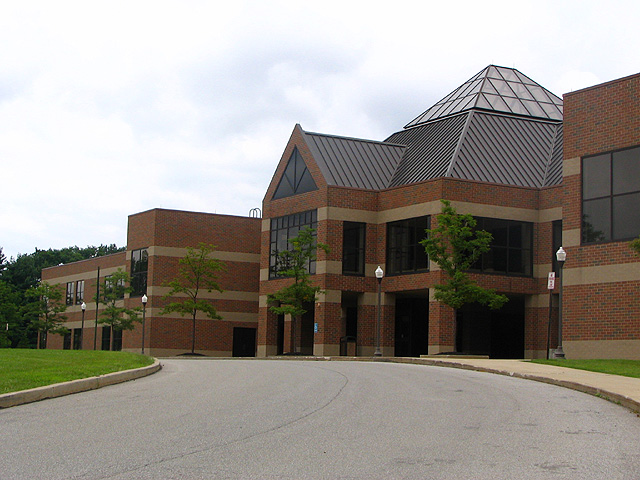
Hudson High School

=== Public education ===
Public schools are included in the Hudson City School District. The largest school in the district is Hudson High School. Hudson City Schools provides education for approximately 4,600 children. Hudson City School District Sports teams are a part of the Suburban League. The sports teams are called the Hudson Explorers.

=== Private ===
There are also many private schools in the area. Seton Catholic School is one. Founded in 1962, Hudson Montessori School is the 13th oldest Montessori school in the United States. Hudson is the original home of what would become Case Western Reserve University in Cleveland and remains home to the Western Reserve Academy, a coeducational boarding and day college preparatory school housed on the original campus of Western Reserve College.

== Infrastructure ==
=== Transportation ===
Ohio's State Route 303, State Route 91, and State Route 8 pass through Hudson. Interstate 480 cuts through the extreme northeast corner of the city, and Interstate 80, the Ohio Turnpike, bisects the city from west to east.

Hudson, unlike many surrounding communities, has retained two-lane roadways in much of its downtown. This has helped preserve the open spaces, historical buildings, and trees that the city values. Much of Hudson is accessible by foot or bike. Hudson was recognized as a Bike Friendly America Bronze City in 2016, and connectivity has improved through successive iterations of what's now known as the Walk & Bike plan.

Downtown is serviced by Metro RTA Bus Route 32, while the Park-and-Ride along Route 8 is serviced by Route 31. The Cleveland Line (Norfolk Southern) runs from Rochester, Pennsylvania to Cleveland, Ohio going through locations such as Ravenna, Hudson, and Maple Heights. There is a spur rail line for local freight from Little Tikes.

=== Healthcare ===
The University Hospitals Hudson Health Center, affiliated with University Hospitals of Cleveland, offers primary and specialty care services, laboratory and general diagnostic radiology services. Also located at this facility are outpatient rehabilitation services.

=== Public Safety ===
==== Fire Department ====
The City of Hudson is protected by a combination volunteer and full-time fire department. Hudson Fire holds the title to many firsts in Summit County. The department was founded in 1849, the first volunteer fire department in Summit County, and celebrated its 175th Anniversary in 2024. Prior to 1886, Hudson Fire was one of two fire departments in all of Summit County, and was the first department in the county to be mechanized, purchasing a hand-powered, horse-drawn pumper in 1859. Unlike most other departments in the area, the Hudson Fire Department does not provide Emergency Medical Services, this service is provided by Hudson EMS, a separate, third-service department, similar to the City of Cleveland. This model provides the benefit of allowing EMS and Fire resources to operate independently; units responding to EMS calls have no negative effect on Fire Department staffing or response, and Fire unit deployment does not deplete EMS resources. Hudson Fire utilizes a primarily on-call response model, where part-time firefighters respond to the station in their personal vehicles before deploying to the scene of an emergency. In 2024, the City of Hudson hired a consultant to review Fire/EMS staffing and facility needs and make recommendations for future operations.

==== Emergency Medical Service ====
Prior to 1977, emergency ambulance service was not available locally in Hudson, requiring a response from Akron instead. After the Police and Fire Departments expressed little interest or ability to aid in the creation of an ambulance service, several women in the area collaborated on the idea that led to the foundation of Hudson Volunteer Medical Service in 1977. In the beginning, volunteer EMTs fielded calls from a single station in the center of town. Unlike the Fire Department, EMS staffing has always been around-the-clock, with at least one crew on station 24/7. As of 2024, Hudson EMS remains a volunteer department, staffed by volunteer EMTs and supported by career and part-time Paramedics.

==== Police ====
As of January 2025, the Hudson Police Department employs 32 full-time police officers and also operates the City of Hudson's 911 call center. Hudson Police dispatchers take 911 calls for Hudson and parts of Twinsburg Township, Boston Heights, Boston Township, and the Village of Peninsula. The dispatch center handles calls and dispatching for all Police, Fire, and EMS units as well as Valley Fire District. In addition to patrol and detective service, the Hudson Police Department also provides School Resource Officers to the local schools, as well as numerous community services such as Safety Town, prescription medication disposal, a vacation watch program, and the SAFER Hudson program for senior citizens. The current Police Chief is Perry Tabak.

== Notable people ==
- Elmer Brandt, also known as Buzz Clic, guitarist for punk rock band the Rubber City Rebels
- John Brown, abolitionist who led the 1859 raid on Harpers Ferry
- John Brown, Jr., son of John Brown
- Owen Brown, father of John Brown.
- Owen Brown, son of John Brown, named after his grandfather
- John Edwards, professional basketball player in the National Basketball Association
- James Ellsworth, industrialist helped modernize Hudson in the early twentieth century
- Lincoln Ellsworth, polar explorer
- Ian Frazier, author and contributor to The New Yorker
- Ben Gedeon, professional football player in the NFL
- Beriah Green, professor of sacred literature at Western Reserve College and Preparatory School
- John Hart, Broadway and Hollywood producer
- Matt Kaulig, founder of LeafFilter and Kaulig Racing.
- David Kirkpatrick, film producer, screenwriter, and studio executive
- Kramies, folklore songwriter/singer-songwriter
- Dante Lavelli, professional football player in the National Football League
- Brad Lepper, archaeologist
- Drew Louis, record producer, songwriter, and singer
- Liam Lynch, musician
- Bill McCreary Jr., professional ice hockey player in the National Hockey League
- Bill Nagy, professional football player in the NFL
- Brian Winters, professional football player in the NFL

== Sister cities ==
- Landsberg am Lech, Bavaria, Germany since 1984
