= Owen Brown (abolitionist, born 1771) =

Father of abolitionist John Brown (1771–1856)

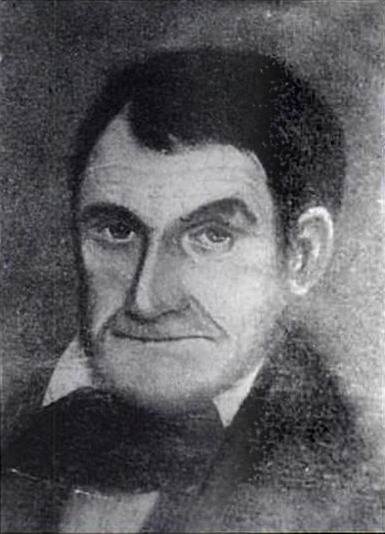
- Born: February 16, 1771; Torrington, Connecticut, British America
- Died: May 8, 1856 (aged 85); Hudson, Ohio, U.S.
- Resting place: Old Hudson Township Burying Ground; 41.24530°N 81.43920°W
- Other name: Squire Brown
- Spouses: Ruth Mills (m. 1793–1808) Sally Root (m. 1809–1840) Lucy Hinsdale (m. 1841–1856)
- Children: 8, including John Brown
- Relatives: Owen Brown, John Brown Junior, Watson Brown (grandsons)

Owen Brown (February 16, 1771 – May 8, 1856), father of abolitionist John Brown, was a wealthy cattle breeder and land speculator who operated a successful tannery in Hudson, Ohio. He was also a civil servant and a fervent, outspoken abolitionist. Brown was a founder of multiple institutions including the Western Reserve Anti-Slavery Society, Western Reserve College, and the Free Congressional Church. Brown gave speeches advocating the immediate abolition of slavery, and organized the Underground Railroad (and served as Stationmaster) in the town of Hudson, Ohio.

His brother Frederick was the father of Rev. Edward Brown who conducted the wedding of Laura Ingalls and Almanzo Wilder in or about 1885 and whose good friend, Ida Brown (birth name Wright), was his adopted daughter.

In 1793, he, Owen Brown, married Ruth Mills, a minister's daughter.

Someone whose father was an intimate friend of Owen remembered him as "a very kind, genial, whole-souled sort of person. He stuttered badly."

Owen wrote two brief autobiographic statements that have survived to the present.

"No one mistook Owen's speech impediment for weakness, or his lack of schooling for ignorance."

== Early life and education ==
One of 10 children, Owen Brown was born on February 16, 1771, to Revolutionary War Capt. John Brown (1728–1776) and Hanna Owen Brown, in Torrington, Connecticut. A lifetime admirer of the Founding Fathers, Owen's first memory was of the departure of his father's militia company to engage the British in New York during the summer of 1776.

== Career ==
A wealthy tanner, cattle breeder, and land speculator, Brown was a dedicated civil servant and was integral to the early growth of Hudson, Ohio. Famed for his resourcefulness and energy, he was known locally as Squire Brown. He was the third wealthiest man in Hudson in the 1830s. Brown served in a multitude of positions in the community including County Commissioner and Justice of the Peace. Brown was deeply rooted in the abolitionist movement. He was personal friends with leaders such as Frederick Douglass, who often stayed with the Brown family when he was lecturing in the area. Owen, in collaboration with David Hudson, was integral in establishing one of the earliest way stations along the Underground Railroad, and personally arranged passage into Canada for many escaped slaves.

Brown left the only church in Hudson over racial issues to form the Free Congregational Church or “Oberlin Church.” An oath against slavery was required for admission to this church.

== Colleges ==
Owen was never a trustee of Western Reserve College, but he was involved in it since its founding. He is credited for securing its location in Hudson as well as overseeing the construction of its first building, a venture on which he made money. During Brown's tenure (1825–1835), Western Reserve College became known as a hotbed of abolitionist ideals. After the death of the institution's first president, Charles Backus Storrs, in 1833 the university elected a more conservative president, George E. Pierce, in an attempt to distance itself from the politics of slavery.

In 1835 Brown resigned his position and along with several faculty, staff, and students of Western Reserve College, and a trustee, a professor, and a large number of students from Lane Theological Seminary in Cincinnati, moved to Oberlin Collegiate Institute (since 1850, Oberlin College) in Oberlin, Ohio. Owen served as trustee there from 1835 to 1844. Brown and others were successful in making Oberlin the first institution of higher learning to admit women and one of the first to admit black students. Owen's daughter, Florella Brown, studied at Oberlin from 1835 to 1839, where she met her husband, Samuel Lyle Adair.

== Death and burial ==
Brown died in Hudson, Ohio, on May 8, 1856, and was buried at Old Hudson Township Burying Ground. His death in Hudson was a "public event": "there was never so large a funeral procession."

== See also ==
- Abolitionism
- Underground Railroad
