= Hudson Historic District =

Hudson Historic District may refer to:

in the United States

(by state then town)

- Hudson Downtown Historic District, Hudson, Michigan, listed on the National Register of Historic Places (NRHP)
- Hudson River Heritage Historic District, a National Historic Landmark District in Barrytown, Germantown, Rhinecliff, Staatsburg, and Tivoli, in New York State
- Hudson Historic District (New York), Hudson, New York, listed on the NRHP
- Hudson Falls Historic District, Hudson Falls, New York, listed on the NRHP in Washington County
- Hudson Historic District (Ohio), listed on the NRHP in Summit County
- Hudson Avenue Historic District, Newark, Ohio, listed on the NRHP in Licking County
