= Connecticut Agricultural Fair =

Until 2006, the Connecticut Agricultural Fair was held annually during the last full weekend of July on the Goshen Fairgrounds in Goshen, Connecticut. A total community event, the Connecticut Agricultural Fair was a not-for-profit event run solely by over 300 volunteers from all corners of Connecticut and beyond. The Connecticut Agricultural Fair offered three days of family-oriented recreation including contests; livestock exhibits; commercial displays; live national, regional, and local entertainment; youth and junior fair activities; equipment displays; and tractor pulls.

The Connecticut Agricultural Fair was designated as a “major” fair in Connecticut, a member of the International Association of Fairs and Expositions (IAFE), as well as the Connecticut Association of Fairs.

== History ==
The Connecticut Agricultural Fair was founded in 1967 by the members and granges of the Connecticut State Grange. Their mission then, and today, is to promote agriculture and to educate the public about its importance in everyone's lives. The first Connecticut Agricultural Fair was held on the Durham Fairgrounds. It was held there until the mid-1980s when the fair moved to its final location on the Goshen Fairgrounds in Litchfield County, in the foothills of the Berkshire Mountains. In 2006, the Connecticut State Grange canceled the fair permanently.
