= West Goshen =

West Goshen can refer to:

- West Goshen, California
- West Goshen, Connecticut
- West Goshen Township, Pennsylvania
