= Hudson Historic District (Ohio) =

Historic district in Ohio, United States

- U.S. National Register of Historic Places
- U.S. Historic district
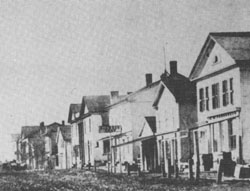
- Historic view of Hudson from the late 1880s

- Location within Ohio Location within the United States
- Location: Roughly bounded by College, Streetsboro, S. Main, and Baldwin Streets; Hudson, Ohio
- Coordinates: 41°14′37″N 81°26′31″W
- Area: 70 acres (28 ha)
- Built: 1806
- Architect: Lemuel Porter Et al.
- Architectural style: Greek Revival, Federal
- NRHP reference No.: 73001542

Significant dates
- Added to NRHP: November 28, 1973
- Boundary increases: October 5, 1989; June 30, 2022

The Hudson Historic District is a historic district located in Hudson, Ohio. It was added to the National Register of Historic Places in 1973.

== History ==
Hudson was established in 1802 and named in honor of its founder, David Hudson, who led a settlement party from Goshen, Connecticut, to Connecticut's Western Reserve. This area of land had been part of the State of Connecticut during the colonial era, and even after Connecticut gave up its claims to western lands of the United States, it retained a portion of northeastern Ohio known as the Connecticut Western Reserve. Noted for its prominent role in the early settlement of northeast Ohio, the Village of Hudson retains much of its New England heritage. Centered by a town green, the town contains outstanding examples of Greek Revival architecture with some regional adaptations. High style examples of Victorian architecture are also found in Hudson.

When the Ohio and Erie Canal started operations through Peninsula, Hudson started to grow and flourish as the canal brought trade, industry and development to the region. Through the efforts of David Hudson, the Western Reserve College was established in 1826 and acquired the reputation of being “the Yale of the West.” Now a private preparatory school, Western Reserve Academy built an early observatory (1838), one of the first built in North America. Master builders Lemuel Porter and his son Simeon worked extensively in Hudson during the early 19th century. Many of their buildings bear a distinctive detail—a truss of wheat fanlight surround. This semi-elliptical element, mimicking cut wheat being held in the middle and dropping down on the ends, is found on the façade of the Bliss House (1831) which faces the town green. The Brewster Mansion, 1853, is an unusual Moorish influenced building that also fronts the green.

After the Civil War, the town prospered with the arrival of railroad related commerce, but many citizens in Hudson over-speculated in the railroads and were financially ruined. In 1882 the college moved to Cleveland and a devastating fire (rumored as the result of a bar fight in the Lockhart Saloon, now Kepner's Tavern) in 1892 destroyed Hudson's downtown area. Salvation for Hudson arrived in the form of returning son James W. Ellsworth. After making millions in the coal industry, Ellsworth returned to Hudson and decided to make it a “model town.” He planted trees, brought electrical service, paved streets, established a water and sewer system and in 1912 built the clock tower in the town green. The town has prospered ever since.
