= Goshen Players =

Community theatre

- Formation: 1949
- Founded at: Goshen, Connecticut, U.S.
- Purpose: Community theatre group

The Goshen Players is a community theatre in Goshen, Connecticut. They occupy the Old Town Hall, located at the intersections of Routes 4 and 63. The Players are one of the oldest continuously performing theatre group in the state.

== History ==
In 1949 a small group gathered in Goshen, Connecticut, to produce an operetta. A few members had professional experience but the majority were amateurs with varying stage experience. Their presentation of Trial By Jury was a success, and they gave request performances in Cornwall, Litchfield, and West Torrington. Proceeds were divided between the Church of Christ, Congregational, and St. Thomas' Church, both of Goshen.

The Goshen Players inaugurated their 2005 season with a production of Blithe Spirit in the fall and Urinetown the Musical in the spring of 2006. A staged reading of Tom Dudzick's comedy Greetings! was performed in November 2006. They chose Neil Simon's Rumors as their fall production of the 2006–2007 season.
