= Twinsburg Township, Summit County, Ohio =

Township in Ohio, US

- Township
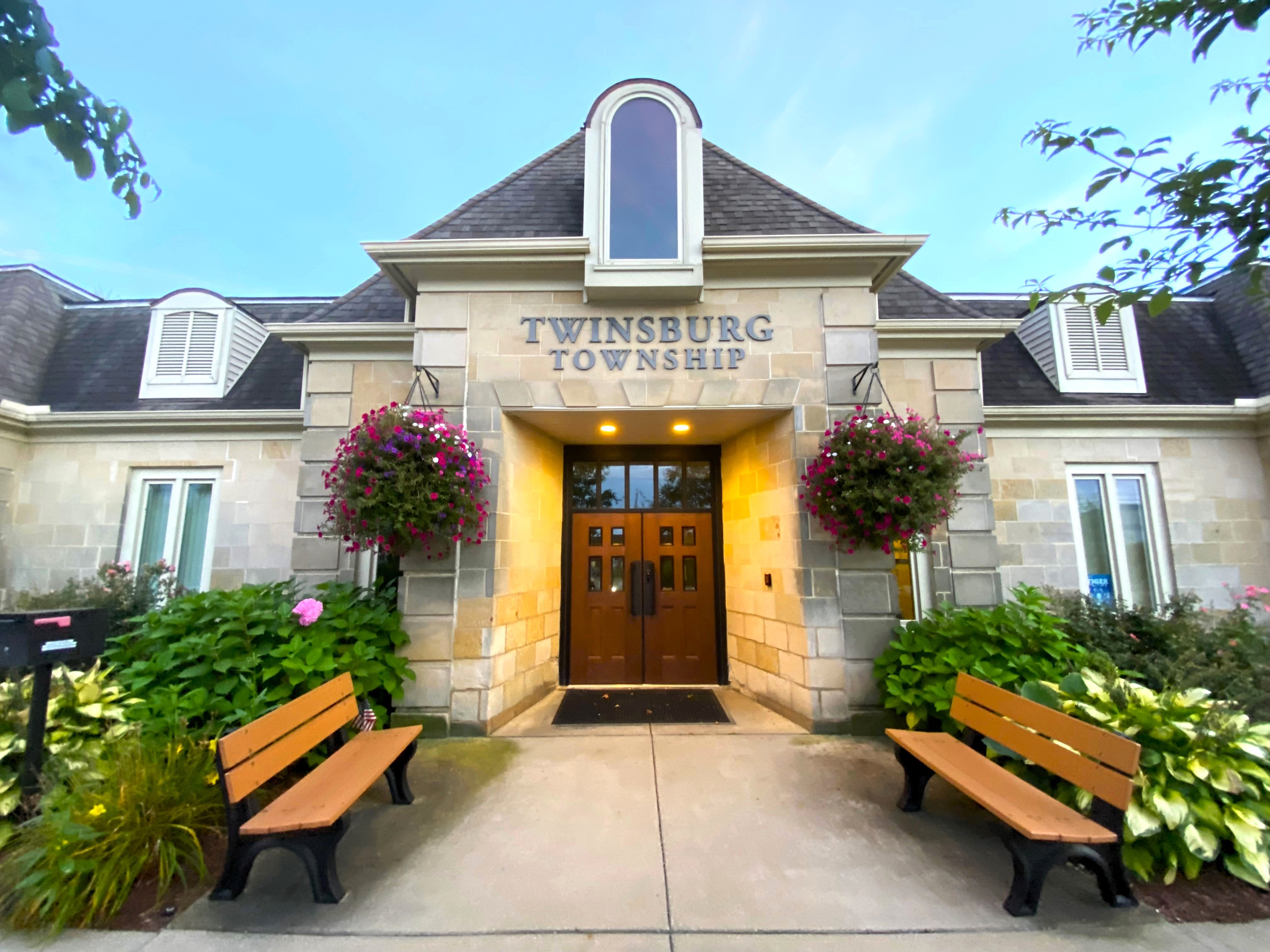

- Location in Summit County and the state of Ohio.
- Coordinates: 41°17′38″N 81°25′29″W
- Country: United States
- State: Ohio
- County: Summit

Area
  - Total: 8.1 sq mi (21.0 km^{2})
  - Land: 8.0 sq mi (20.8 km^{2})
  - Water: 0.077 sq mi (0.2 km^{2})
- Elevation: 1,073 ft (327 m)

Population (2020)
  - Total: 3,857
  - Density: 480/sq mi (185.4/km^{2})
- Time zone: UTC-5 (Eastern (EST))
  - Summer (DST): UTC-4 (EDT)
- ZIP codes: 44087 44236
- Area code: 330
- FIPS code: 39-78064
- GNIS feature ID: 1087021
- Website: Twinsburg Township

Twinsburg Township is one of the nine townships of Summit County, Ohio, United States. The 2020 census found 3,857 people in the township.

== Geography ==
Twinsburg Township's current area is much smaller than it was originally. It is also discontinuous.

=== Original boundaries ===
- Northfield Center Township, to the west
- Bedford Township, Cuyahoga County, to the northwest
- Solon Township, Cuyahoga County, to the north
- Bainbridge Township, Geauga County, to the northeast
- Aurora Township, Portage County, to the east
- Streetsboro Township, to the southeast
- Hudson Township, to the south
- Boston Township, to the southwest

=== Current boundaries ===
- Macedonia - west
- Twinsburg - northwest
- Solon - north
- Reminderville - northeast
- Aurora - east
- Hudson - south

Several municipalities occupy what was originally part of Twinsburg Township:

- Part of the city of Macedonia, in the west
- The village of Reminderville, in the northeast
- The city of Twinsburg, in the north and center

== Name ==
It is the only Twinsburg Township statewide. The name of the township comes from the Wilcox brothers, Aaron and Moses, who were twins.

== History ==
Attempts at merging the city and townships of Twinsburg have not been successful.

Twinsburg Township's land has been in the following counties:

Year	County
1788	Washington
1797	Jefferson
1800	Trumbull
1808	Portage
1840	Summit

== Demographics ==
=== 2020 census ===
Twinsburg Township racial composition
Race	Number	Percentage
White (NH)	2,013	52.2%
Black or African American (NH)	1,225	31.8%
Native American (NH)	3	0.08%
Asian (NH)	251	6.51%
Pacific Islander (NH)	5	0.13%
Other/mixed	261	6.77%
Hispanic or Latino	99	2.57%

== Government ==
The township is governed by a three-member board of trustees, who are elected in November of odd-numbered years to a four-year term beginning on the following January 1. Two are elected in the year after the presidential election and one is elected in the year before it. There is also an elected township fiscal officer, who serves a four-year term beginning on April 1 of the year after the election, which is held in November of the year before the presidential election. Vacancies in the fiscal officership or on the board of trustees are filled by the remaining trustees.
