= Hervey Brooks Pottery Shop and Kiln Site =

Archaeological site in Connecticut, United States

- U.S. National Register of Historic Places
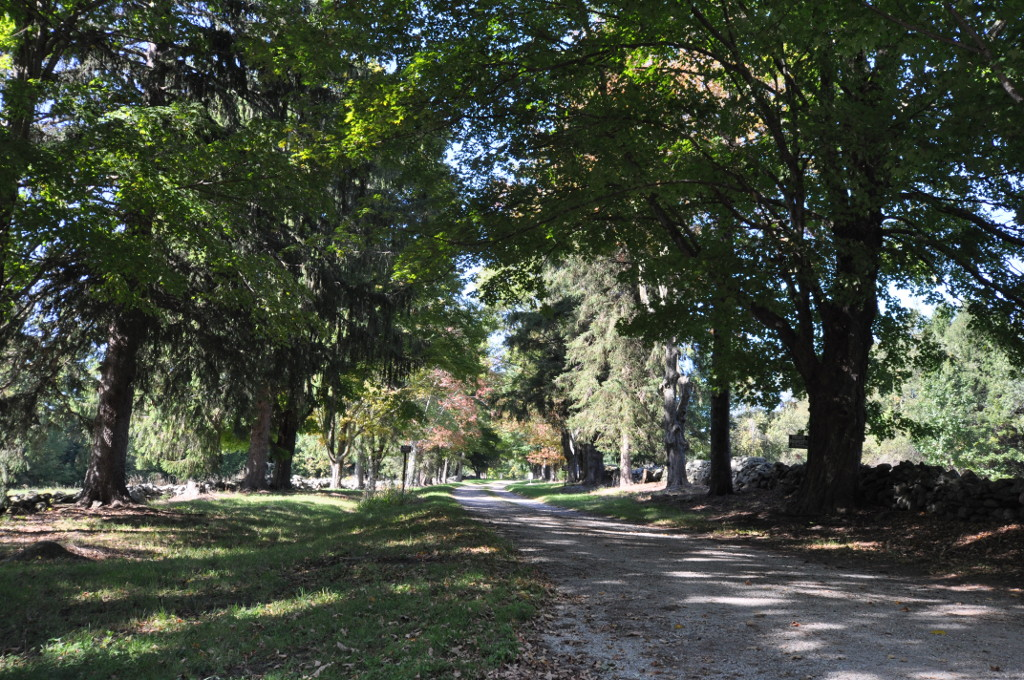
- View of the lane leading to the site
- Location: Goshen, Connecticut
- Area: less than one acre
- Built by: Brooks, Hervey
- NRHP reference No.: 93001362
- Added to NRHP: December 10, 1993

The Hervey Brooks Pottery Shop and Kiln Site is a historic industrial archaeological site in Goshen, Connecticut. It is the site of the 19th-century pottery of Hervey Brooks, a local potter significant for his extensive recordkeeping. Brooks' pottery included a shop and a brick kiln. The shop structure was moved to Old Sturbridge Village in the 20th century, where a reconstruction of his kiln has also been undertaken. The original site is of archaeological significance for identifying the materials Brooks used and how he laid out his work site, and for identifying how those changed over time.

The site was listed on the National Register of Historic Places in 1993.

== See also ==
- National Register of Historic Places listings in Litchfield County, Connecticut
