= David Hudson (pioneer) =

Founder of Hudson, Ohio

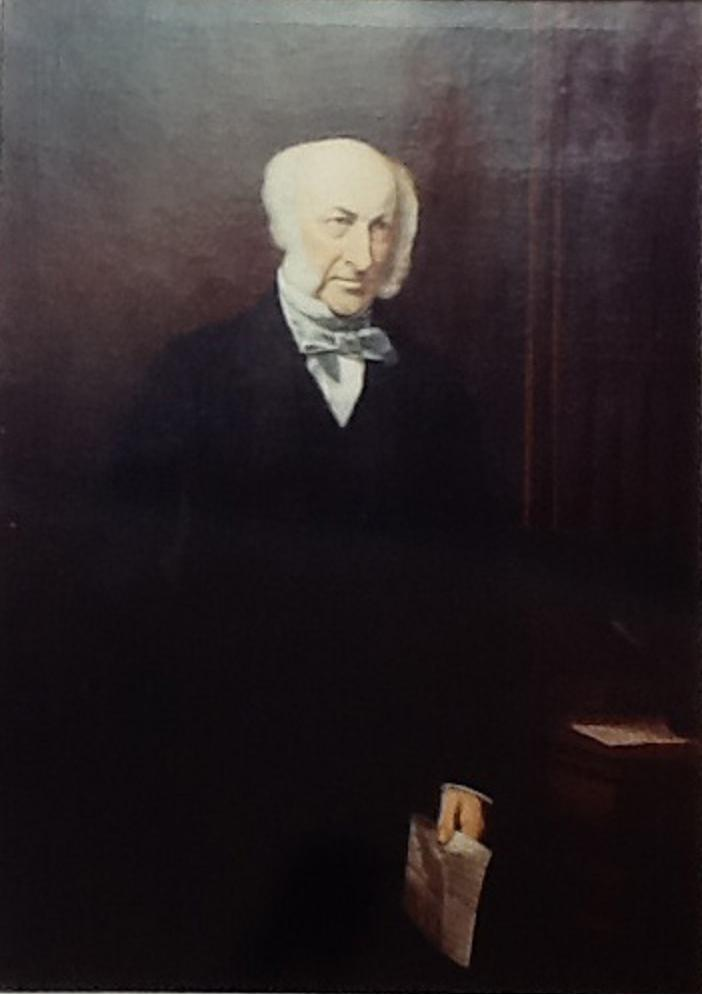
- Portrait of Hudson by J. O. Osborne (c. 1851)
- Born: February 17, 1761; Branford, Connecticut, U.S.
- Died: March 17, 1836 (aged 75); Hudson, Ohio, U.S.
- Known for: Founding Hudson, Ohio

David Hudson (February 17, 1761 – March 17, 1836) was an American businessman noted for founding Hudson Township, now Hudson, Ohio. Hudson was born in Branford, Connecticut, and lived there until the age of four. His family then moved to Goshen, Connecticut, where he lived for many years, owned a farm, married Anna Norton in 1783, and raised the oldest seven of their nine children. In 1789, Hudson joined a group to purchase a parcel of land in the Connecticut Western Reserve. The following year, he left Goshen to survey the parcel and settle it as Hudson Township. Hudson traveled through the state of New York, west along Lake Erie and south along the Cuyahoga River to reach his land.

At the settlement, Hudson and his men built a home. The township's population increased steadily over the next few decades. Hudson's wife and children eventually moved to the township, where they had two more children. Hudson cited religion as a major influence on his life. He died on March 17, 1836, at age 75.

== Early life ==
Hudson was born in Branford, Connecticut, on February 17, 1761, the youngest child of David Hudson and Rebecca Fowler. Four years after his birth, his family moved to Goshen, Connecticut.

According to a family legend, Hudson served as a drummer boy during the American Revolutionary War (which began in 1775, when he was 14). His service is unconfirmed, however, and his name does not appear in the Historical Register of Officers of the Continental Army. There is also doubt about Hudson's claim that his property was "spent" at the hands of the British. If his land had been raided, he would have received a share of the Firelands, a tract of land given residents of Connecticut in compensation for war damages, and Hudson would probably not have later invested in and settled land in the Connecticut Western Reserve.

On December 22, 1783, Hudson married Anna Norton, daughter of David Norton and Anna Brownson, and together they raised their first seven children in Goshen until 1799. Hudson owned a substantial farm there. On October 10, 1795, Hudson bought $1,200 worth of stock of the Connecticut Land Company, owner of the Connecticut Western Reserve (a tract of land which was to be subdivided and sold).

=== Religion ===
According to Hudson, his early religious experiences shaped his later life. His father, a Presbyterian, became a Baptist when Hudson was nine. Six years later, his father became a Quaker. The elder Hudson's frequent changes of religion made his son a skeptic; Hudson claimed disgust with the "failings and immoralities" of "many professing Christians." Later, however, he cited the French Revolution as his religious "awakening". Hudson was repelled by the uprising's violence and disregard for life; in 1798 he proclaimed himself a "political Christian", and later a "speculative Christian". From then on, Hudson felt it his duty to lead a religious life. He was quiet about his beliefs, however: "My pride would not permit me to unburthen my soul to any living person. I hated company". In his writings, Hudson cited the principles of "morality, religion, law observance and education" which may have influenced his later actions, including the settlement of land in the west.

== Establishment of Hudson ==
=== Travel ===
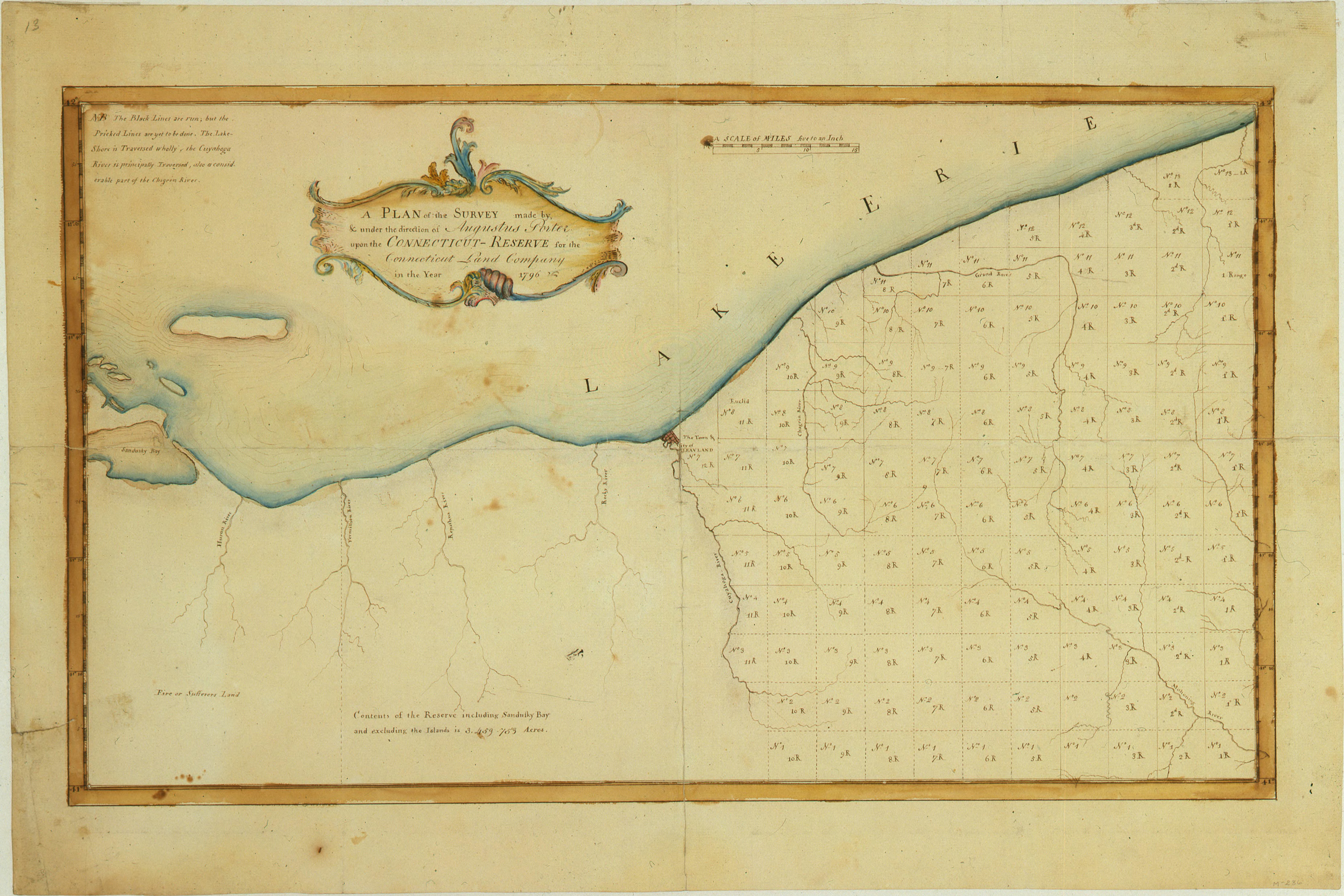
Map of the Connecticut Western Reserve in 1796

In 1795, the Connecticut Land Company bought land in Northeast Ohio, then known as the Connecticut Western Reserve. The parcel was divided into 129 townships, each measuring 25 square miles (65 km^{2}). Hudson bought a plot of land in the Reserve (township 4, range 10) in 1798 in partnership with a group including Birdsey and Nathaniel Norton, who provided three-fourths of the money for the purchase. Of the group, only Hudson left for the land with a small group of settlers (including his son Ira and employees Jesse Linsley and William McKinley), on April 22, 1799.

The group reached Albany, New York, two days later, where Joseph Darrow was hired. Hudson also bought $46.50 worth of goods in Albany and nearby Schenectady. A few members of the group, including Ira Hudson, left to drive cattle to the settlement. The others then traveled across New York along the Mohawk River valley, passing through Fort Schuyler in Utica (where Jonah Meechum was hired on April 29). The group then arrived at Onondaga (near present-day Syracuse) on May 2, where Richard Blin was hired. They reached East Bloomfield, where Birdsey Norton lived, on May 5. The party replenished its supplies and Hudson met with Benjamin Tappan, who was on his way to a settlement near Hudson's. They agreed to travel together by boat, while another small group herded livestock overland, to their respective settlements. On May 16, 1799, the group, consisting of Hudson, Darrow, Blin, McKinley and Tappan, traveled north to Lake Ontario. Departing in several boats from Oswego, they traveled west towards Lake Erie.

Although Hudson anticipated that the trip would take less than a month, it took 56 days. Most of the journey was by water, and ice on the Niagara River, inclement weather and ice on Lake Erie, and unnavigable portions of the Cuyahoga River contributed to the travelers' slow progress. Although ice on Lake Erie and the Buffalo River near Niagara Falls destroyed one boat, the group reached Cleaveland (present-day Cleveland, Ohio) on June 9, 1799. After purchasing more supplies, they set off down the Cuyahoga River. Although Hudson believed that the river could carry their boats as far south as required, they only reached present-day Northfield on June 20. When the settlers arrived in the vicinity of their parcel they had difficulty locating its four boundary markers, finding the southwest marker in late June. (Note: Some sources list the date as June 17 (calling into question the group's reported June 20 arrival in Northfield) and others June 26.) Only one of the two groups herding cattle overland reached the settlement.

=== Hudson Township ===
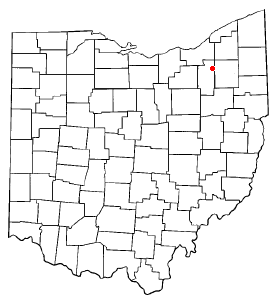
Location of Hudson Township in northeastern Ohio

After establishing the center point of their parcel, Hudson and his partners built a trail from that point to their boat on the Cuyahoga. It took more than a week for the group to build the trail and carry their goods from the boat. They then built a small shelter, and began to establish the township.

The group experienced hardship over the next few months, including wet weather and a shortage of food. Hudson traveled back up the Cuyahoga to Cleveland in an attempt to buy food. "The weather was exceeding wet and very cold, and I experienced the most uncomfortable night I ever felt", he wrote in his journal. When Hudson returned to Cleveland, he found few settlers and no food to spare. He continued east on Lake Erie to the mouth of Cattaraugus Creek, a stream in Western New York. There, Hudson obtained food and brought it back to the settlement.

By autumn, its population had grown to thirteen; the group built a 16-by-18-foot (4.9 m × 5.5 m) log house and planted a small turnip garden and a 9-acre (3.6 ha) wheat field. By this time most of the plot had been surveyed, and surveying was completed on October 11.

The following day Hudson, his son Ira and two other men returned to Goshen, Connecticut, to sell land on the Western Reserve. Hudson's boat was leaky and the trip was difficult due to cold, inclement weather, but in Goshen he found his family in good health. Hudson sold land on his settlement to twenty-eight people, offering 40 acres (16 ha) to the first purchaser (Miss Ruth Gaylord, who gave the land to her niece).

On January 1, 1800, Hudson and his family left Goshen for the township, their new permanent residence. The family stopped in Bloomfield, New York, where they met with the rest of the settlers. Hudson purchased livestock and a year's worth of supplies for $2,000, giving the livestock to four men to drive overland to the settlement. On April 30, the remaining settlers embarked on eight boats, arriving on May 20. On October 28, Anna Hudson gave birth to Anne Maria, the first person born in the settlement.

By the end of the year, Hudson's colony was the first established settlement in present-day Summit County. A few more settlers arrived in 1801, and in 1802 the settlement became officially known as Hudson Township.

== Post-establishment ==
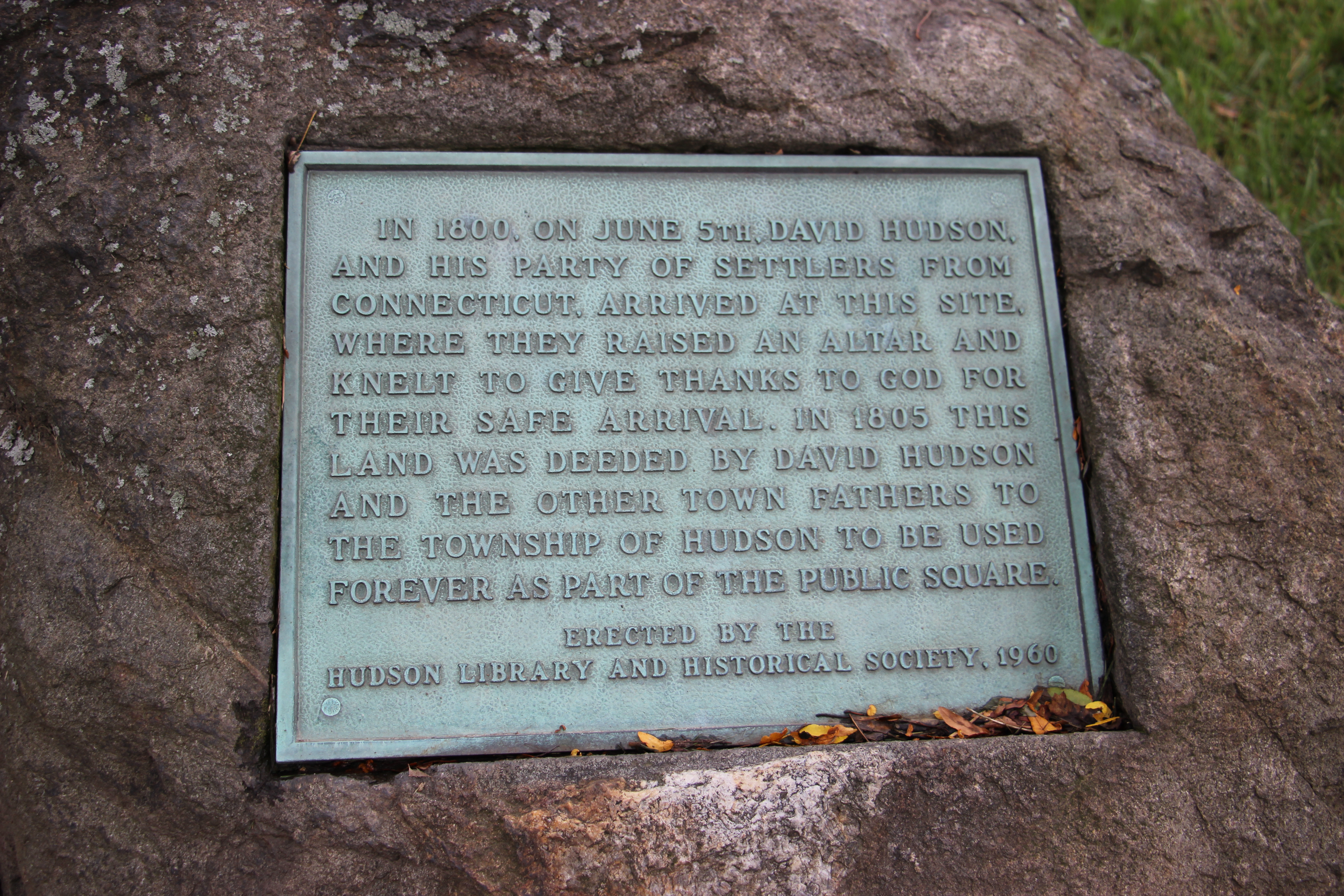
A 1960 plaque dedicated to David Hudson and his party by the Hudson Library and Historical Society, marking a plot of land that was set aside in 1805 to be used as a public square.

After establishing Hudson Township, Hudson played a significant part in the buying, selling and farming of land in his and neighboring towns. By 1808, he owned a total of 2,994 acres (12.12 km^{2}) of land in Hudson and Chester Townships. On this land Hudson grew hay, potatoes, corn and wheat, and managed hogs, oxen, cows, sheep and horses. He also provided accommodations for visitors to the town. Hudson was party to about 200 financial transactions, making him a prominent figure in the area. During this period, it was typical for employers to pay employees partially in whiskey. Hudson broke this tradition by declining to pay his workers with alcohol, to their disgruntlement. (At the time, use of alcohol was viewed much more negatively than it has been since the 1933 failure of Prohibition in the United States. Many called for it to be outlawed. To not pay with liquor would have been seen as progressive.)

Hudson's home, built in 1805–06, was the first frame house in town. Two-and-a-half stories tall, it measured 40 by 30 feet (12.2 m × 9.1 m). In addition to housing Hudson's family, it was the town's first post office, tavern, and courtroom. The courtroom was used for trials heard by justice of the peace Arthur St. Clair, whom Hudson appointed in 1800 in one of his first actions after founding the town. Hudson served as the township's first postmaster, holding the office until he was removed from the position in 1829 after opposing Andrew Jackson in the 1828 presidential election. The house was also a frequent source of food and shelter for travelers, including fugitive slaves on the Underground Railroad, due to the township's central location in the Western Reserve. David Hudson Jr., Hudson's son, recorded the names of hundreds of people who passed through the house in his diaries. Hudson's wife, Anna, gave birth to the last two of their nine children in the township. David Jr., the youngest, was the last in a line of six generations of youngest Hudson sons named David. Anna Hudson died in August 1816. The following January, Hudson married Mari Robinson. Hudson died on March 17, 1836, at 75 years of age.
