= Marshepaug River =

River in the towns of Goshen and Litchfield, Connecticut

Marshepaug River (Also called Ackerman Brook, Great Pond River, Marshapogge River, Mashepaug River, and other names)
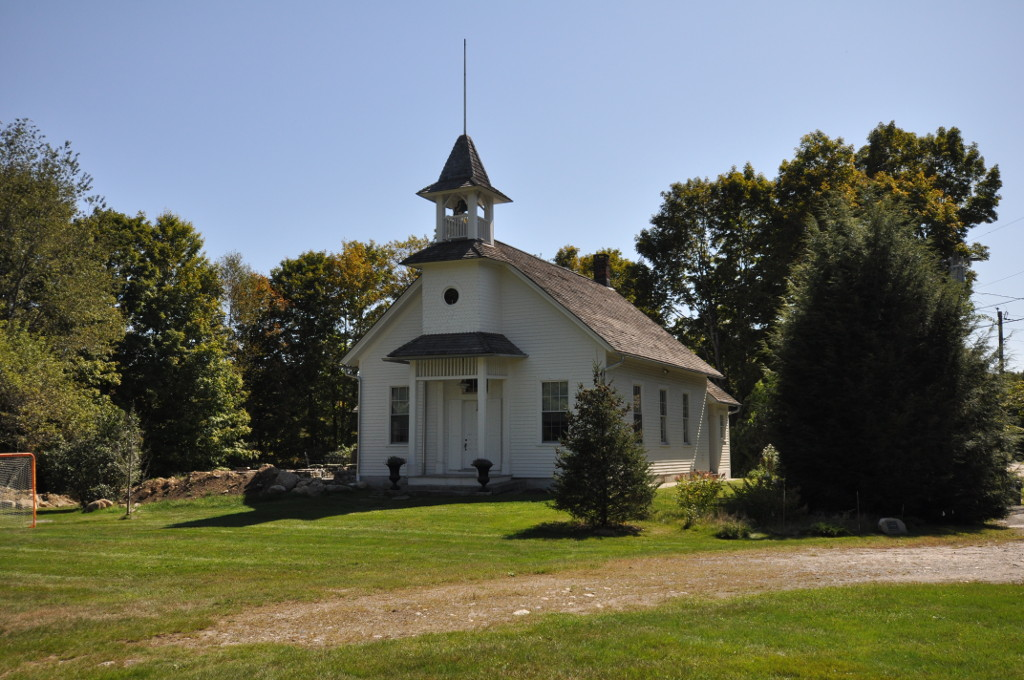
- Milton Historic District on the Marshepaug River Source and mouth of Marshepaug River in Connecticut

Location
- Country: United States
- States: Connecticut
- Towns: Goshen, Litchfield

Physical characteristics
- Source: Woodbridge Lake
  - location: Goshen, Massachusetts
  - coordinates: (41°47′53″N 73°15′13″W)
  - elevation: 1,138 ft (347 m)
- Mouth: East Branch of the Shepaug River
  - location: Litchfield, Connecticut
  - coordinates: (41°46′01″N 73°16′39″W)
  - elevation: 978 ft (298 m)
- Length: 3 mi (4.8 km)
- Basin size: 7,291.86 acres (2,950.91 ha)
- Width
  - maximum: 30 feet (9.1 m)

Basin features
- River system: Housatonic
- Gradient: 52.66 fpm

The Marshepaug River is a 3-mile-long (4.8 km) stream in the towns of Goshen and Litchfield in northwest Connecticut in the United States. The river rises near the southwest corner of Woodbridge Lake and then flows in a southwest direction through the Milton Center Historic District to its mouth on the East Branch of the Shepaug River. It drains an area of more than 7,000 acres (2,800 ha) and has a gradient of over 52 feet per mile.

== History ==
During the 19th century, the river provided waterpower for sawmills, gristmills, bloomery forges, and other industries.
