= Hudson Township, Summit County, Ohio =

Coordinates: 41°14′36″N 81°26′20″W

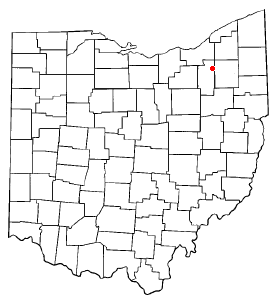
Location of Hudson Township within the state of Ohio

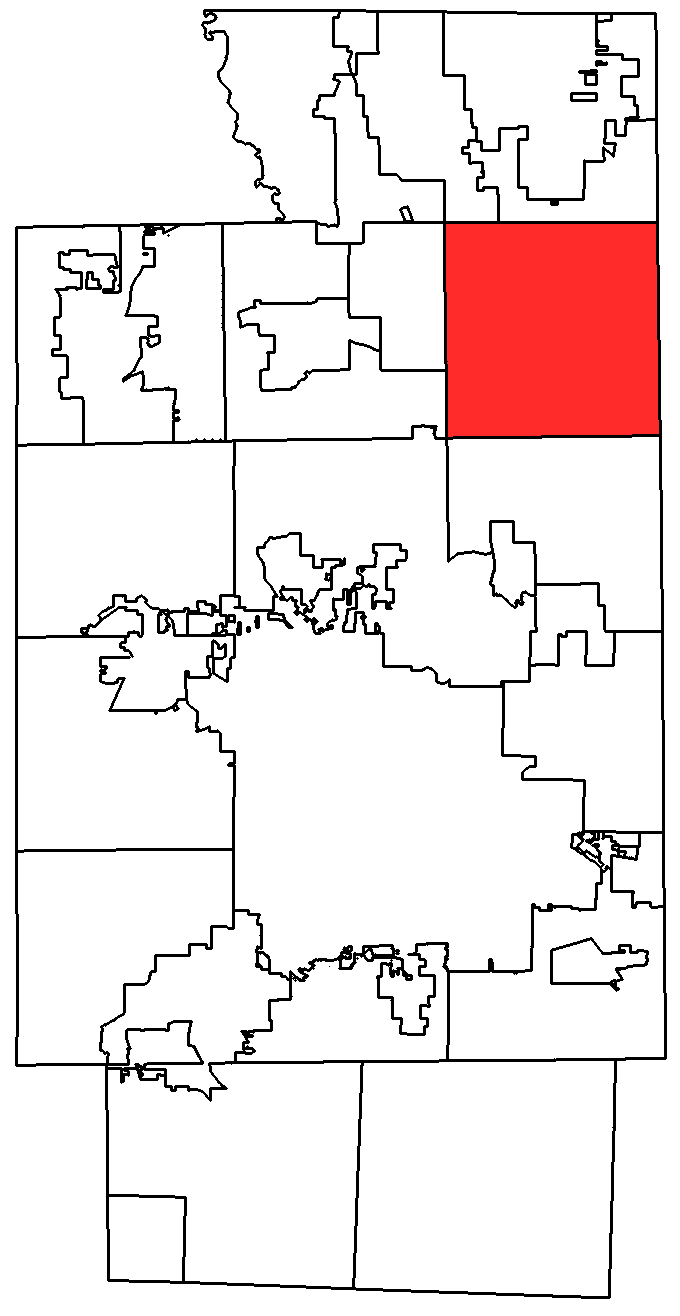
Location and original extent of Hudson Township within Summit County. The highlighted region is the City of Hudson today.

Hudson Township was one of the 16 original townships in Summit County, Ohio. When created, it occupied survey Range 10, Town 4 in the Connecticut Western Reserve and was about 25 square miles (65 km^{2}) in area. Its first settlers were David Hudson and his party from Goshen, Connecticut in 1799. It was in the eastern part of Summit County, bordering Macedonia, Twinsburg Township, Streetsboro, Stow, Boston Township, and Boston Heights. The Village of Hudson, incorporated in 1837, was nearly surrounded by the township. No other municipalities expanded into Hudson Township via annexation. In 1994, Hudson Township and the village of Hudson merged to create the City of Hudson.

== Geography ==
Hudson was originally bounded by Stow Township on the south, Boston Township on the west, Twinsburg Township to the north and Streetsboro Township to the east. At the time of its merger with the Village of Hudson, however, its neighbors were the same as they are at present.

== Land use ==
Hudson Township was rural for most of its existence. It was known for its dairy farms. Considerable growth began in the 1950s with the 1955 opening of the Ohio Turnpike and the 1957 establishment of the General Motors Euclid Division, Terex.

== Counties ==
Hudson Township's land has been in the following counties:

Year	County
1788	Washington
1797	Jefferson
1800	Trumbull
1808	Portage
1840	Summit
