= Goshen Historic District (Goshen, Connecticut) =

Historic district in Connecticut, United States

- U.S. National Register of Historic Places
- U.S. Historic district
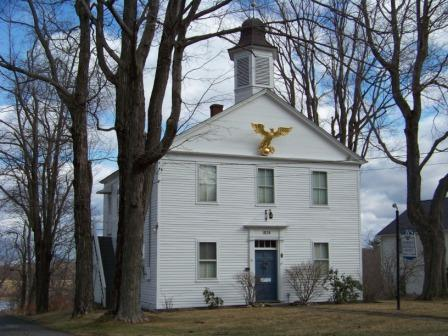
- Goshen Academy building, in 2010

- Location within Connecticut Location within the United States
- Location: CT 63 and 4, and Gifford Road, Goshen, Connecticut
- Coordinates: 41°49′50″N 73°13′25″W
- Area: 160 acres (65 ha)
- Built: 1760
- Architectural style: Greek Revival, Federal, Victorian
- NRHP reference No.: 82000996
- Added to NRHP: December 27, 1982

Goshen Historic District is a historic district encompassing the town center village of Goshen, Connecticut. Centered at the Junction of Connecticut Routes 4 and 63, the village developed historically as a rural crossroads of two turnpikes, and has retained its rural character. It is dominated by residential architecture from the first half of the 19th century, and includes churches, a store, and the town's former 1895 town hall. It was listed on the National Register of Historic Places in 1982.

== Description and history ==
The town of Goshen, located in the hills of northwestern Connecticut, was settled in the mid-18th century. Its village center, near its geographic center, grew following the development of the east-west turnpike between Torrington and Sharon (now Route 4), and the north-south turnpike between Litchfield and Canaan (now Route 63). The town has remained rural and agricultural in character, with limited industry. In the mid-19th century, the village economy was boosted by the success of Simon Scoville, a blacksmith who established a carriage factory. Scoville's factory has not survived (it was where the town's modern town hall/library/school complex is located, just north of the district), but a remnant iron furnace does survive. Scoville also built a number of modest Greek Revival worker houses.

The historic district extends mainly along Route 63, beginning at Lyman Lane in the south, and ending at the modern town hall complex in the north. It also extends east along Route 4. Historic buildings in the district include examples of Greek Revival, Federal, and Victorian architecture from as early as 1760. Its most prominent buildings are civic and religious in nature, including the Goshen Academy and the 1832 Goshen Congregational Church. The 1895 Old Town Hall, located at the main junction, is a distinctive example of Shingle style architecture. Other examples of Victorian architecture include the Lavallette-Perrin House, which is an eclectic blend of Greek and Gothic Revival elements.

== Gallery ==
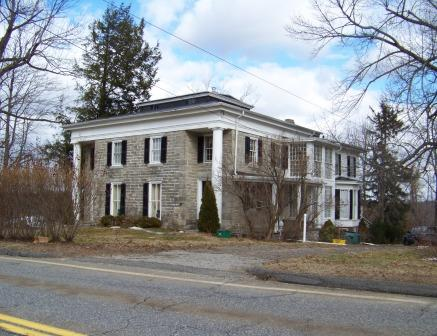
Myron Norton House

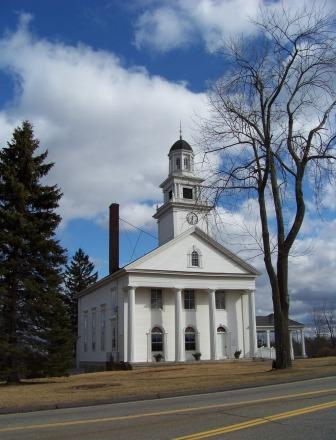
1832 Congregational Church

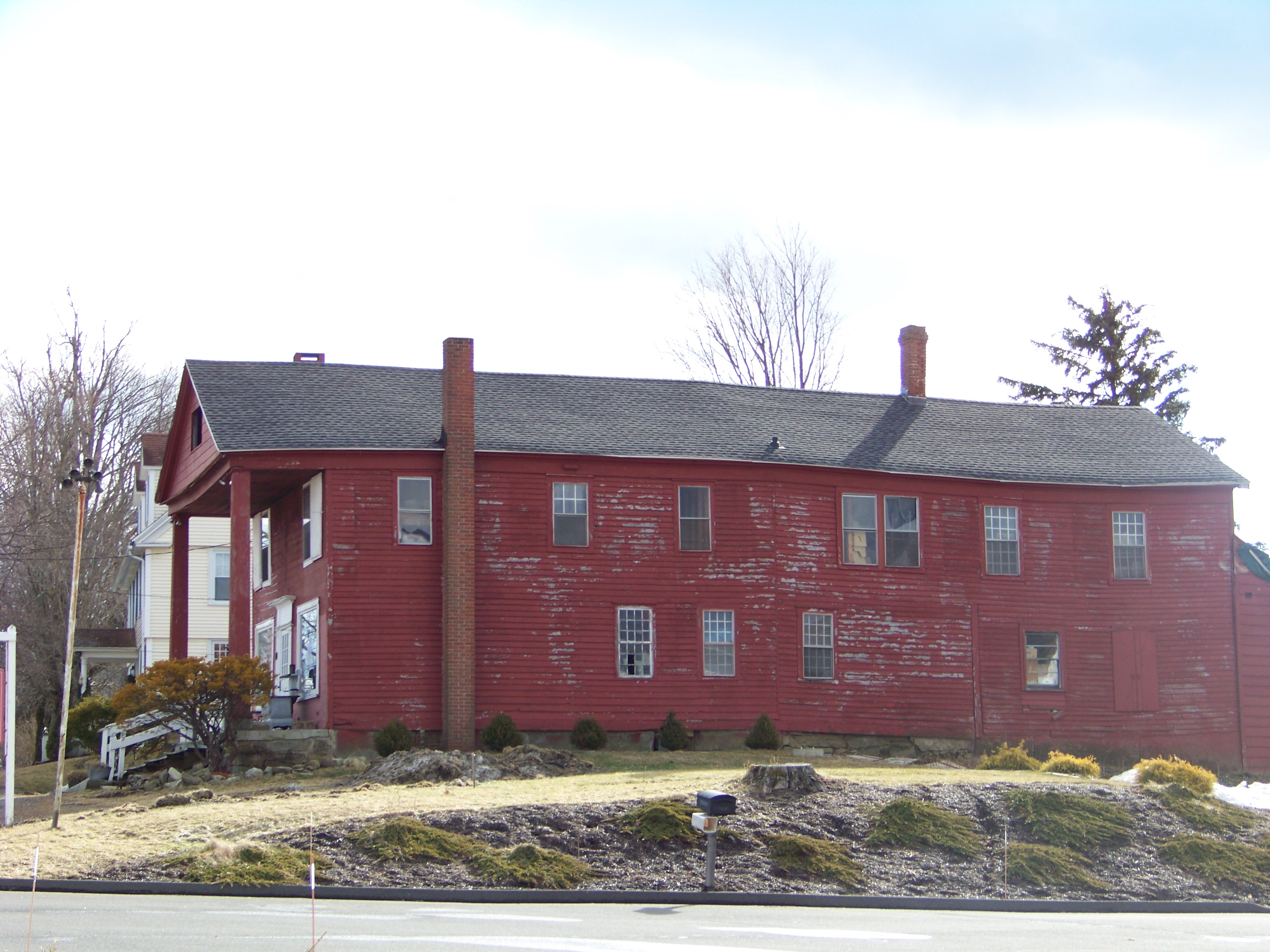
Elisha Sill House

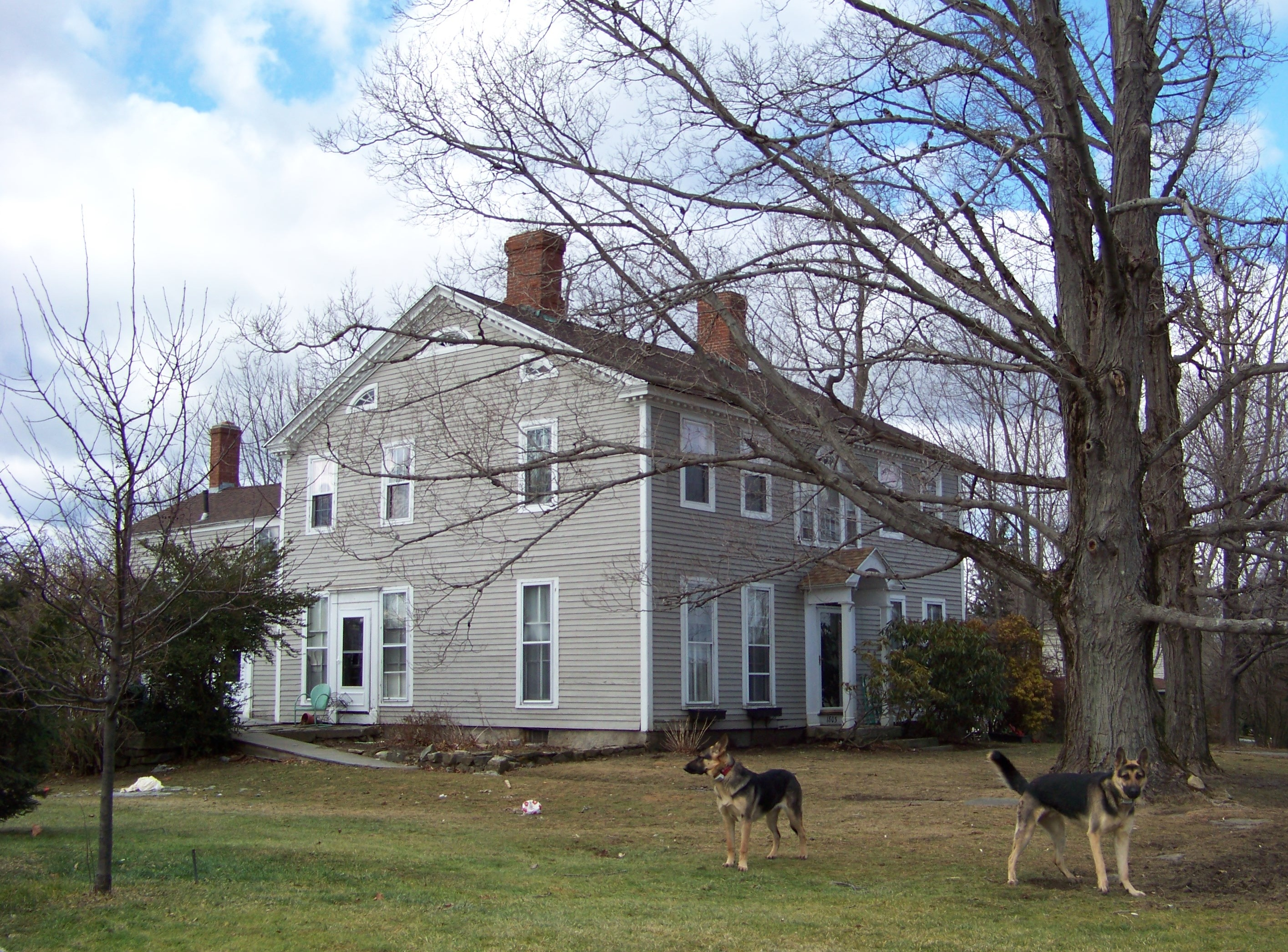
David Thompson House, guarded by German shepherds

== See also ==
- West Goshen Historic District, also NRHP-listed
- National Register of Historic Places listings in Litchfield County, Connecticut
