= West Goshen Historic District =

Historic district in Connecticut, United States

- U.S. National Register of Historic Places
- U.S. Historic district
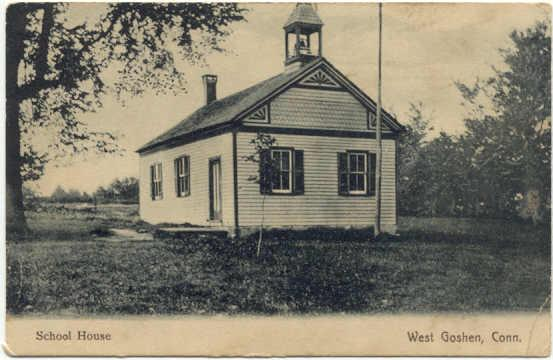
- Postcard depicting a schoolhouse in West Goshen (1911 postmark)

- Location within Connecticut Location within the United States
- Location: Roughly bounded by CT 4, Beach, Mill and Milton Streets, and Thompson Road Goshen, Connecticut
- Coordinates: 41°49′32″N 73°15′16″W
- Area: 29 acres (12 ha)
- Built: 1790
- Architectural style: Greek Revival, Federal, Vernacular Federal
- NRHP reference No.: 87000982
- Added to NRHP: October 23, 1987

The West Goshen Historic District is a historic district in the village of West Goshen in the town of Goshen, Connecticut, United States. It encompasses a well-preserved early 19th-century industrial village, with twenty historically significant properties in the village, most of which lie on Connecticut Route 4 between Beach Street and Thompson Road. The district was listed on the National Register of Historic Places in 1987.

== Description and history ==
The village of West Goshen, located west of the village center of Goshen on the Sharon Turnpike (Connecticut Route 4), was isolated and not developed until that road was built about 1770. The area was recognized for the potential of its water power earlier, with a gristmill and sawmill standing on the banks of local waterways in the 1740s. More development took place with the construction of a woolen mill in 1810, intended to process the output of Goshen's large sheep population. This prompted the construction of worker housing for the mill employees, and a small village quickly arose. The West Goshen Store, built in 1814, is one of the products of this period of growth. The village declined around the time of the American Civil War, as water power began to be phased out for industrial works.

The historic district is about 29 acres (12 ha) in size, extending along Route 4 between Beach Street and Thompson Road. It is roughly bisected by a branch of the Marshepaug River, where its mill resources (none of which have survived in more than archaeological form) survive. Most of this area's buildings are residential and were built in the early decades of the 19th century, with Federal or Greek Revival style. There are some buildings that are older and some that date to the 1880s. Non-residential buildings include the former West Goshen Store (330 Rt. 4) and a former carding mill at 331 Rt. 4, built in 1818.

== See also ==
- Goshen Historic District
- National Register of Historic Places listings in Litchfield County, Connecticut
