= Goshen, Connecticut =

- Town
- Town of Goshen
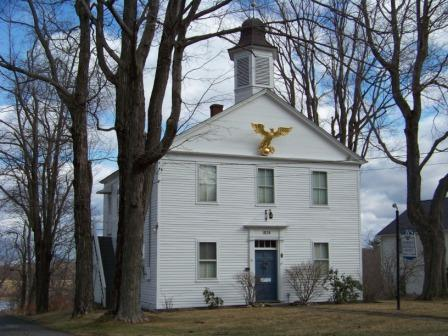
- Goshen Academy building

- Seal
- Interactive map of Goshen, Connecticut
- Coordinates: 41°51′05″N 73°14′09″W
- Country: United States
- U.S. state: Connecticut
- County: Litchfield
- Region: Northwest Hills
- Incorporated: 1739

Government
  - Type: Selectman-town meeting
  - First selectman: Seth Breakell (R)
  - Selectman: Scott Olson (R)
  - Selectman: Dexter Kinsella (D)

Area
  - Total: 45.2 sq mi (117.0 km^{2})
  - Land: 43.6 sq mi (113.0 km^{2})
  - Water: 1.5 sq mi (4.0 km^{2})
- Elevation: 1,319 ft (402 m)

Population (2020)
  - Total: 3,150
  - Density: 72.2/sq mi (27.9/km^{2})
- Time zone: UTC-5 (Eastern)
  - Summer (DST): UTC-4 (Eastern)
- ZIP code: 06756
- Area codes: 860/959
- FIPS code: 09-32290
- GNIS feature ID: 0213433
- Website: www.goshenct.gov

Goshen is a town in Litchfield County, Connecticut, United States. The population was 3,150 at the 2020 census. The town is part of the Northwest Hills Planning Region.

== Geography ==
Goshen is in central Litchfield County and is bordered to the east by the city of Torrington. According to the United States Census Bureau, the town of Goshen has a total area of 45.2 square miles (117.0 km^{2}), of which 43.6 square miles (113.0 km^{2}) are land and 1.5 square miles (4.0 km^{2}), or 3.44%, are water. A large portion of the Mohawk State Forest is located in the town. The Appalachian Trail formerly passed through the town until it was re-routed west of the Housatonic River.

=== Principal communities ===
- Goshen Center
- West Goshen

Other minor communities and geographic areas in the town are Hall Meadow, North Goshen, Tyler Lake, West Side, and Woodridge Lake. Woodridge Lake is private. It is only available to residents (it is not a gated community). They have access to the clubhouse, and all of the lake's beaches.

== History ==
The town was incorporated in 1739, one year after settlement of the town center began. The community was named after the Land of Goshen, in Ancient Egypt. The Congregational church was founded the following year. During the 18th century, Goshen was a farming, and later, prosperous business community. Gunmakers from the town such as the Medad Hills manufactured guns during the French and Indian War and Revolutionary War.

The first school in Goshen was built in 1753. A seminary for young women was established in 1819. The Goshen Academy was established several years later and became a well-regarded preparatory school during the 19th century.

Settlers from Goshen were the first to settle Hudson Township, Summit County, Ohio, in the Connecticut Western Reserve.

== Notable locations ==
Historic sites in the town include:

- Hervey Brooks Pottery Shop and Kiln Site, an archeological site listed on the National Register of Historic Places (NRHP)
- Goshen Historic District (Goshen Center) – CT 63 and 4 and Gifford Road, NRHP-listed
- West Goshen Historic District – roughly bounded by CT 4, Beach, Mill and Milton Streets, and Thompson Road, NRHP-listed

== Transportation ==
Connecticut Route 4 is the principal east–west through route in the town, while Connecticut Route 63 serves as the main north–south road. Route 4 leads east into Torrington and west into Cornwall, while Route 63 leads northwest to South Canaan and southeast to Litchfield.

== Demographics ==
Historical population
Census	Pop.	Note	%±
1820	1,585		—
1850	1,457		—
1860	1,381		−5.2%
1870	1,223		−11.4%
1880	1,093		−10.6%
1890	972		−11.1%
1900	835		−14.1%
1910	675		−19.2%
1920	675		0.0%
1930	683		1.2%
1940	778		13.9%
1950	940		20.8%
1960	1,288		37.0%
1970	1,351		4.9%
1980	1,706		26.3%
1990	2,329		36.5%
2000	2,697		15.8%
2010	2,976		10.3%
2020	3,150		5.8%
U.S. Decennial Census

As of the census of 2000, there were 2,697 people, 1,066 households, and 814 families residing in the town. The population density was 61.8 inhabitants per square mile (23.9/km^{2}). There were 1,482 housing units at an average density of 33.9 per square mile (13.1/km^{2}). The racial makeup of the town was 98.26% White, 0.48% African American, 0.15% Native American, 0.74% Asian, and 0.37% from two or more races. Hispanic or Latino of any race were 1.22% of the population.

There were 1,066 households, out of which 29.4% had children under the age of 18 living with them, 67.5% were married couples living together, 5.4% had a female householder with no husband present, and 23.6% were non-families. 20.2% of all households were made up of individuals, and 6.9% had someone living alone who was 65 years of age or older. The average household size was 2.53 and the average family size was 2.91.

In the town, the population was spread out, with 22.7% under the age of 18, 5.3% from 18 to 24, 25.1% from 25 to 44, 31.7% from 45 to 64, and 15.2% who were 65 years of age or older. The median age was 43 years. For every 100 females, there were 97.4 males. For every 100 females age 18 and over, there were 98.5 males.

The median income for a household in the town was $64,432, and the median income for a family was $72,452. Males had a median income of $48,125 versus $30,464 for females. The per capita income for the town was $33,925. About 2.9% of families and 3.3% of the population were below the poverty line, including 4.1% of those under age 18 and 3.9% of those age 65 or over.

Voter registration and party enrollment as of October 25, 2005
Party	Active voters	Inactive voters	Total voters	Percentage
Republican	745	16	761	37.29%
Democratic	413	6	419	20.53%
Unaffiliated	827	33	860	42.14%
Minor Parties	1	0	1	0.05%
Total	1,986	55	2,041	100%

Presidential Election Results
Year	Democratic	Republican	Third Parties
2024	43.3% 910	55.0% 1,154	1.7% 35
2020	43.0% 902	55.3% 1,161	1.7% 37
2016	36.9% 673	58.4% 1,064	4.7% 86
2012	42.0% 751	56.9% 1,017	1.1% 19
2008	47.4% 856	51.3% 927	1.3% 24
2004	42.2% 715	56.3% 954	1.5% 27
2000	39.7% 585	53.5% 788	6.8% 100
1996	39.6% 518	45.6% 597	14.8% 194
1992	31.0% 447	41.0% 591	28.0% 404
1988	33.9% 403	64.7% 769	1.4% 16
1984	29.3% 318	70.1% 761	0.6% 7
1980	29.8% 286	56.0% 538	14.2% 137
1976	34.4% 279	64.7% 525	0.9% 8
1972	30.5% 225	67.9% 501	2.6% 12
1968	34.4% 240	61.3% 428	4.3% 30
1964	51.6% 329	48.4% 309	0.00% 0
1960	31.5% 214	68.5% 465	0.00% 0
1956	20.2% 123	79.8% 485	0.00% 0

== Arts and culture ==
Multiple events are hosted at the Goshen Fairgrounds each year, located on Route 63 south just outside the center of town. One such event is the Goshen Stampede, a festival held annually on Father's Day weekend that hosts a rodeo, demolition derby, music festival, and truck pull. Later in the summer on Labor Day weekend is the annual Goshen Fair. As the county's largest agricultural fair, it features farm animal judgement shows, competition and contest in log chopping, log sawing, hay-bale throwing and the like. There are food, art, photography, baked goods, and craft contests, as well as rides for children, carnival games, and craft and food vendors. Attendance over the three days can range up to 50,000 people.

Traditionally at the beginning of August, and usually the first Saturday, the Church of Christ presents an Annual Blueberry Festival where they sell blueberry pies, blueberries and host a blueberry breakfast. It is very well known and people from all around the area come to enjoy the festival and the pies. The blueberry pies are available for sale all year long, as well as other flavors made by hand by the congregation (apple, peach, and blueberry-peach). Mini pies are also sold by the church at the Goshen Fair.

Cinzi Lavin's play A Goodnight Kiss is based on the historical love-letters of two young Goshen residents during the Civil War. Produced and directed by Kathy Kelly, it premiered at Goshen Players in 2025.

The town is also home to the Goshen Players.

== Notable people ==
- William R. Brewster, American Civil War general
- David Darling, cellist and composer
- Daniel S. Dickinson, U.S. senator
- Ezra Foot, Wisconsin state senator
- Eunice Newton Foote, scientist, inventor and woman's rights campaigner
- Asaph Hall, astronomer credited with discovering the moons of Mars
- Madeleine L'Engle, author
- Frederick Miles, congressman
- Ebenezer F. Norton, congressman
- Mary Pope Osborne, author
- Kevin Phillips, author and political analyst
- Isaac Williams, Jr., congressman
