= Unitarian Universalist Church of Kent Ohio =

- Unitarian Universalist Church of Kent, Ohio
- Unitarian Universalist Church of Kent Ohio
- 41.156°N 81.360°W
- Location: 228 Gougler Ave., Kent, Ohio
- Country: United States
- Denomination: Unitarian Universalism
- Website: Unitarian Universalist Church of Kent

History
- Former name: First Universalist Church of Kent
- Status: Church
- Founded: 1866

Architecture
- Functional status: Active

Unitarian Universalist Church of Kent, Ohio is a Unitarian Universalist ("UU") church in Kent, Ohio. Founded in 1866, the current building was completed by builder Joseph Gridley (1820-1902) in 1868 on land donated by philanthropist Marvin Kent and rests on a bedrock of sandstone. Its 19 founding members were among the major movers and shakers of the then Village of Franklin Mills, and included abolitionists and Civil War veterans. They were: Dr. Aaron M. Sherman, M.D., who served as a Civil War surgeon (“contract surgeon” for the 46th Ohio Volunteer Infantry and who was stationed at “Lincoln General Hospital” in Washington, D.C.), a prominent civic promoter, served many terms on the local school board, co-founded the Rockton Masonic Lodge that occupies the historic 1883 summer home of Marvin Kent on West Main Street, served as a State Representative in the Ohio State House of Representatives and whose 1858 home first built by Zenas Kent (father of Marvin) for his daughter Frances and her husband George Wells was recently saved, moved and restored by local historic preservation activists, Arvin Olin, Ransom Olin, Nelson Olin, Joseph Stratton, who, in 1882, donated the large bell that is in the church belfry, Phillip Boosinger, Mary Boosinger, Rhoda Boosinger, James D. Haymaker (son of Frederick Haymaker, member of a family who had strong abolitionist leanings and a business partner of abolitionist John Brown, who resided in Kent for a time) and Mary Rosetta Olin Haymaker, J.G. Whitcomb, T.H. Marshall, Eliza Wright, A. Merrell, Almund Russell (a member of a prominent Franklin Mills abolitionist family), Sybil Bradley, Effie Parsons, Mary J. Parsons and Mary A. Furry. These 19 men and women gathered on May 27, 1866, to write and sign the church's constitution in the historic 1836 Village Hall that would serve as an early place of worship before the church building was completed next door in 1868. It is the only church still using its original 19th-century building in the city of Kent and in 1976 the site was designed as a "significant restored building site". In the early and middle twentieth century when there were few women clergy anywhere in the United States, the church is notable for having several women ministers: Abbie Danforth in 1889, Carlotta Crosley in 1903, and Violet Kochendoerfer in 1972. Membership is between 140 and 200 full-time adults as well as 100 children in its religious education programs. The church runs a summer camp called Kent Hogwarts which is a Harry Potter-themed camp for young kids, which emphasizes chemistry, poetry, singing and community service. The church advocates social justice, environmental awareness, democracy and acceptance of diverse peoples including all religions. The Kent church follows the seven basic principles of Unitarian Universalism.

The church hosts funeral and memorial services, concerts including classical and jazz music, public meetings on local issues, speeches advocating democracy, and other community events. It holds an annual book sale. In 2016, Rev. Melissa Carvill-Ziemer led the church on a course of structural expansion, seeking variances to expand its physical size. As part of a renovation project, the ceiling of the sanctuary will be removed to expose the vaulted beams from the earlier roof as well as a stained glass window.

Reverend Carvill-Ziemer was appointed chief minister in 2005. In 2010, the church ordained Rev. Renee Ruchotzke and appointed her as its Affiliated Community Minister.

Unitarian Universalists are accepting of all who come to worship ... There's room here for theological diversity ... There's room here for people who don't really know what they believe and what is hold for them and want to explore that.

— Pastor Melissa Carvill-Ziemer in 2007

Church leaders have advocated against racism, and marched with other interfaith leaders for racial justice. According to a demographic analysis by Google, the city of Kent is the "most racist" in northeastern Ohio. Carvill-Ziemer advocated against white privilege. In 2010, Ziemer and fellow Unitarian Universalists from Kent traveled to Arizona to protest the state's immigration legislation; she was arrested in Phoenix for allegedly blocking traffic in front of a sheriff's office. A judge later found her not guilty and she was released.

The church has a long history of social action. In 1900, minister Abbie Danforth created and led the Portage County suffrage association and chaired a two-day conference on women's suffrage. Danforth had studied at Canton Theological School and had been ordained in 1878, just 15 years after suffragist Olympia Brown, who was the first woman ever to be ordained in the United States. In the late 1960s, the church served as a site for a local food co-op that later became the Kent Natural Foods Co-op.

In the 1960s and 1970s, the church was active in the anti-war movement. After the May 4, 1970 shootings on the Kent State University campus, the church:

- refused to pay its telephone tax.
- defied Mayor Leroy Satrom and County Prosecutor Ron Kane's order forbidding more than five people to meet by holding a memorial service for the slain students.
- passed resolutions censuring President Nixon, demanding civil liberties from the mayor and county prosecutor, and demanding the immediate withdrawal of troops from Southeast Asia.

== Ministers ==
Ministers
Years	Name	Notes
1866-1876	Andrew Willson	
1876-1879	J.S. Gladhill	
1879-1884	Edward Morris	
1884-1889	R.B. Marsh	
1889-1891	Abbie Danforth	
1891-1895	O.G. Colgrove	
1895-1897	H.K. Regal	
1897-1898	A.I. Spanton	
1898-1900	Abbie Danforth	
1900-1901	F.M. Hayes	
1902-1903	Carl Henry	
1903-1908	Carlotta Crosley	
1908-1916	Ira A. Priest	
1916-1918	Martin Fereshtian	
1918-1920	John M. Grimes	
1920-1922	Edward Lewis	
1922-1925	Harry Wright	
1925-1928	F. Osten-Sacken	
1928-1929	James Houghton	
1929-1933	Carl H. Olson	
1933-1934	Ralph Boyd	
1935-1936	Edward Day	
1937-1942	Charles A. Hallenbeck	
1942-1943	Robert O’Neil	
1943-1962	John Flint	
1962-1965	Bjarne Kjelshus	
1965-1968	Peter T. Richardson	
1970-?	William Schulz	
1972-1978	Violet Kochendoerfer	
1992-2004	Julie-Ann Silberman-Bunn	
2004-2005	Sonya Montana	
2005–2016	Melissa Carvill-Ziemer	
2017	Anya Drew Johnston	
2018–2024	Steven A. Protzman	
2024-	Kristina Church	
2010–present	Renee Ruchotzke, Affiliated Community Minister	
