= Kent, Ohio =

- City
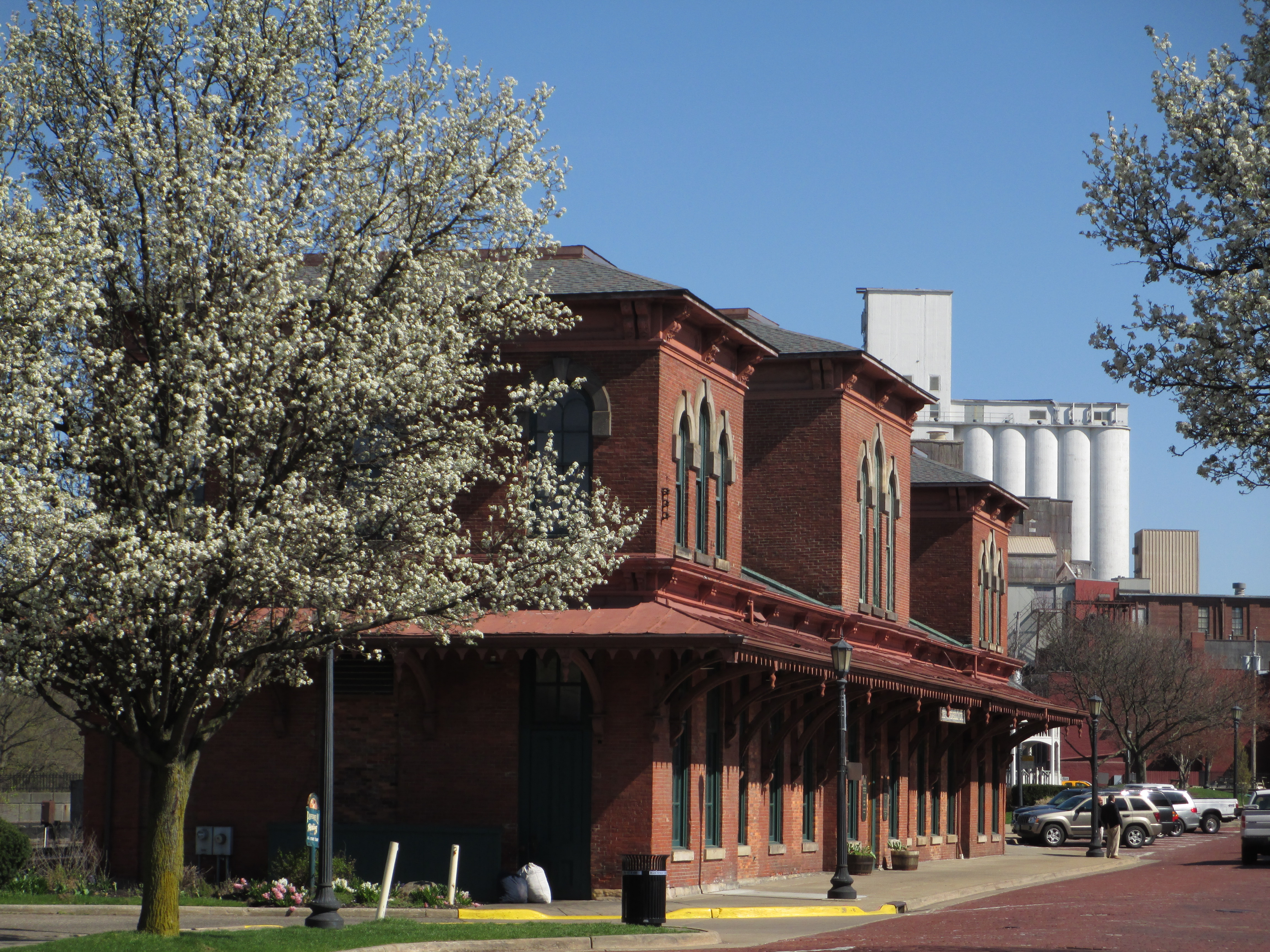
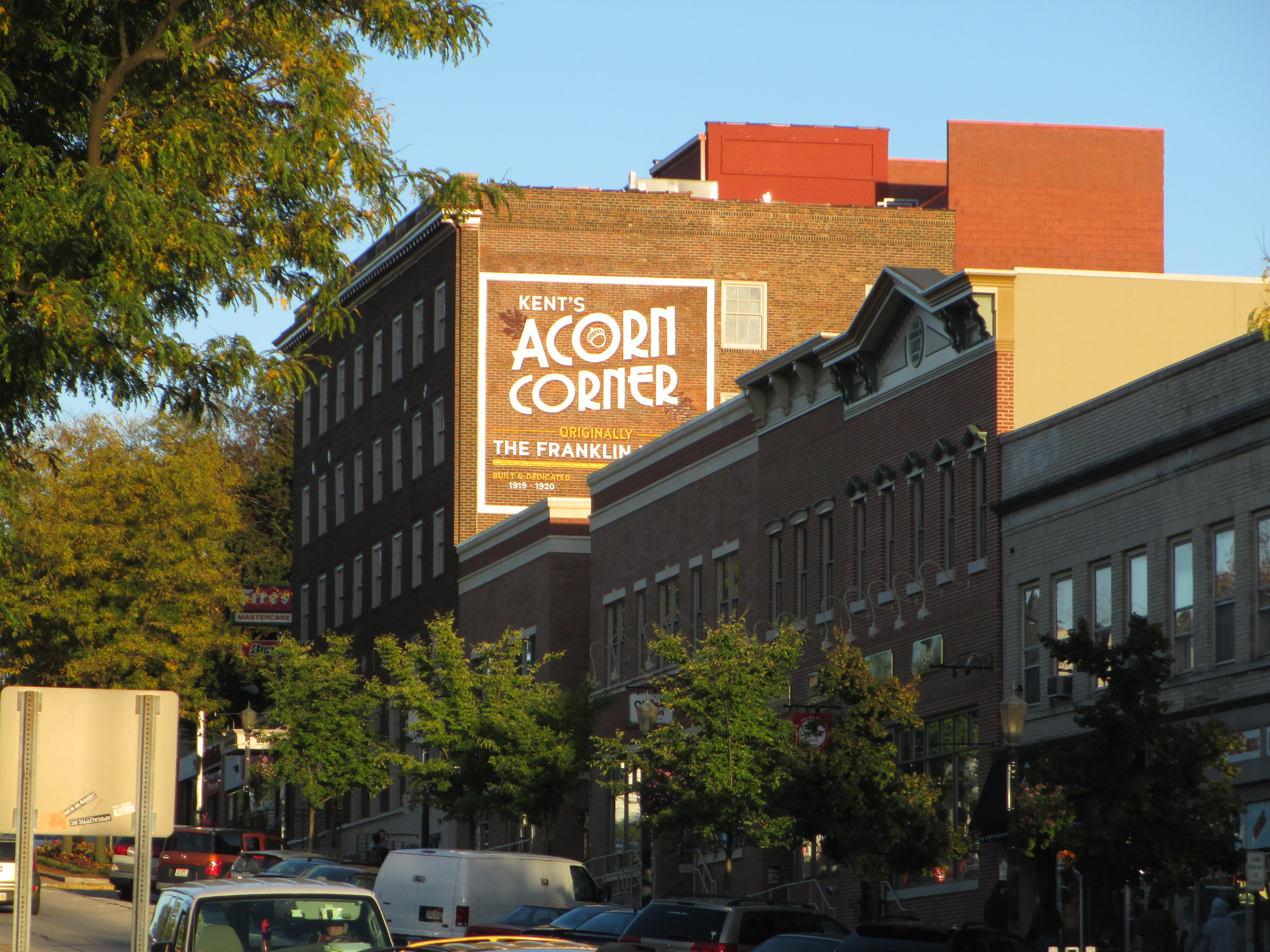
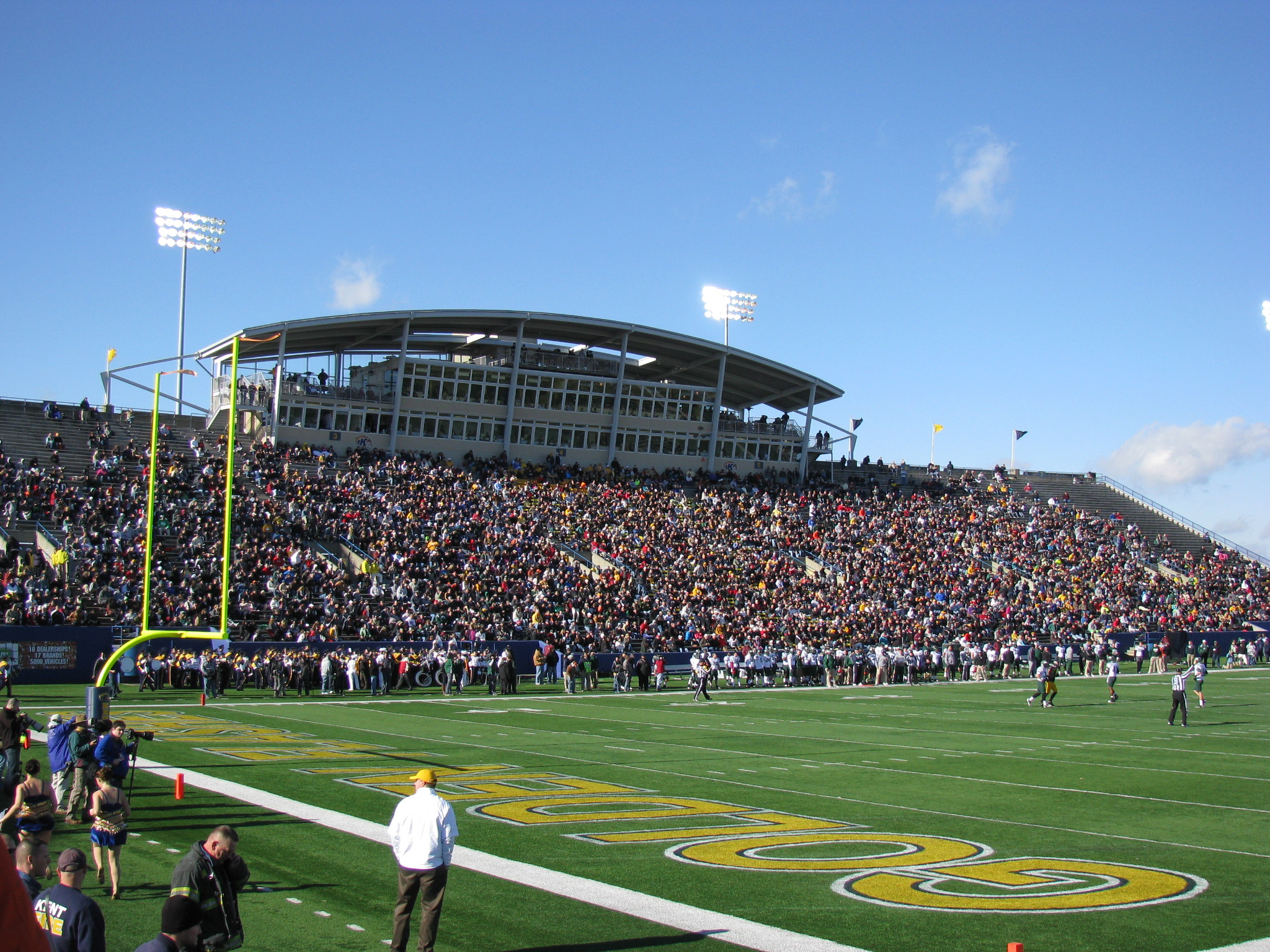
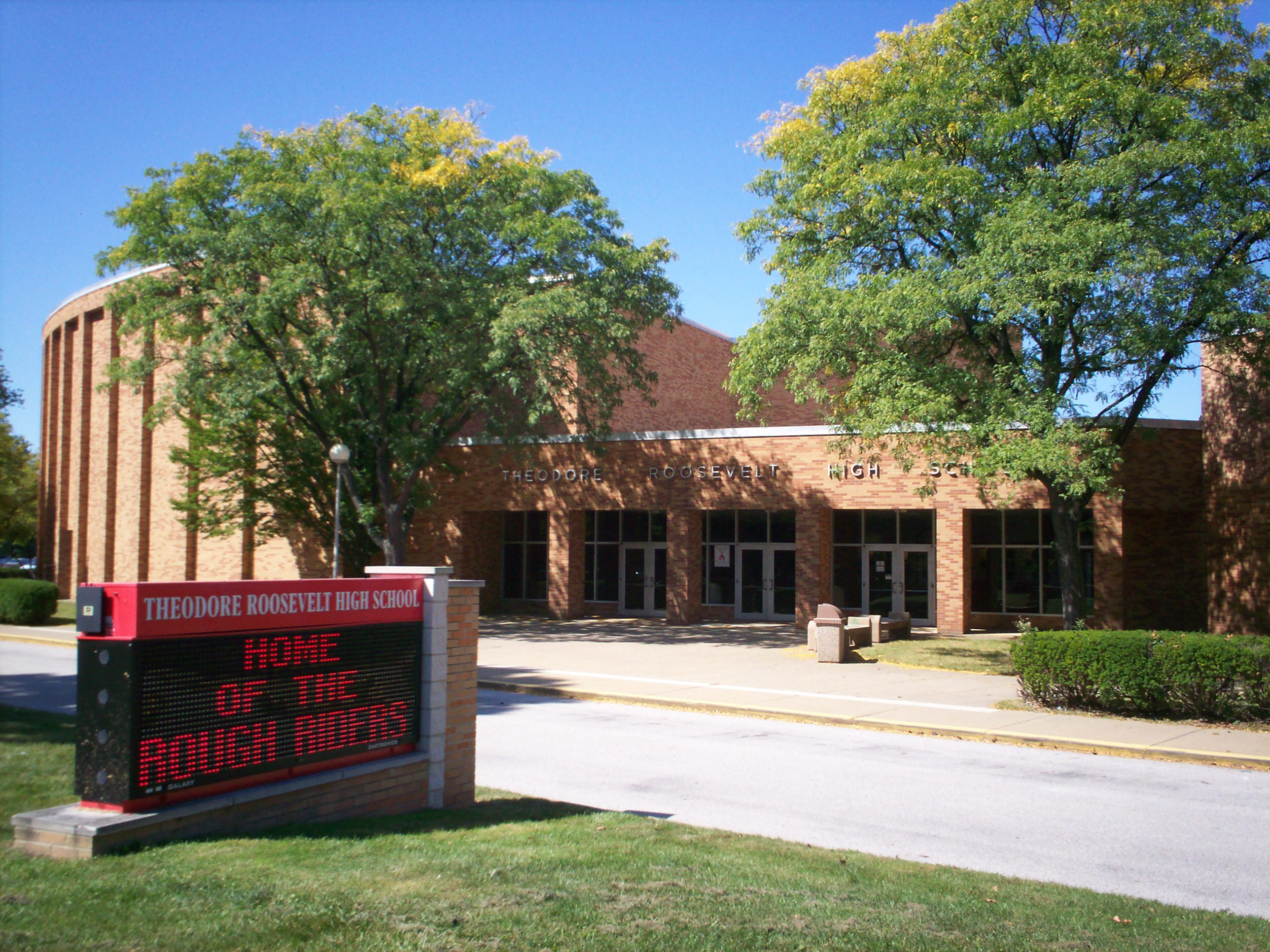
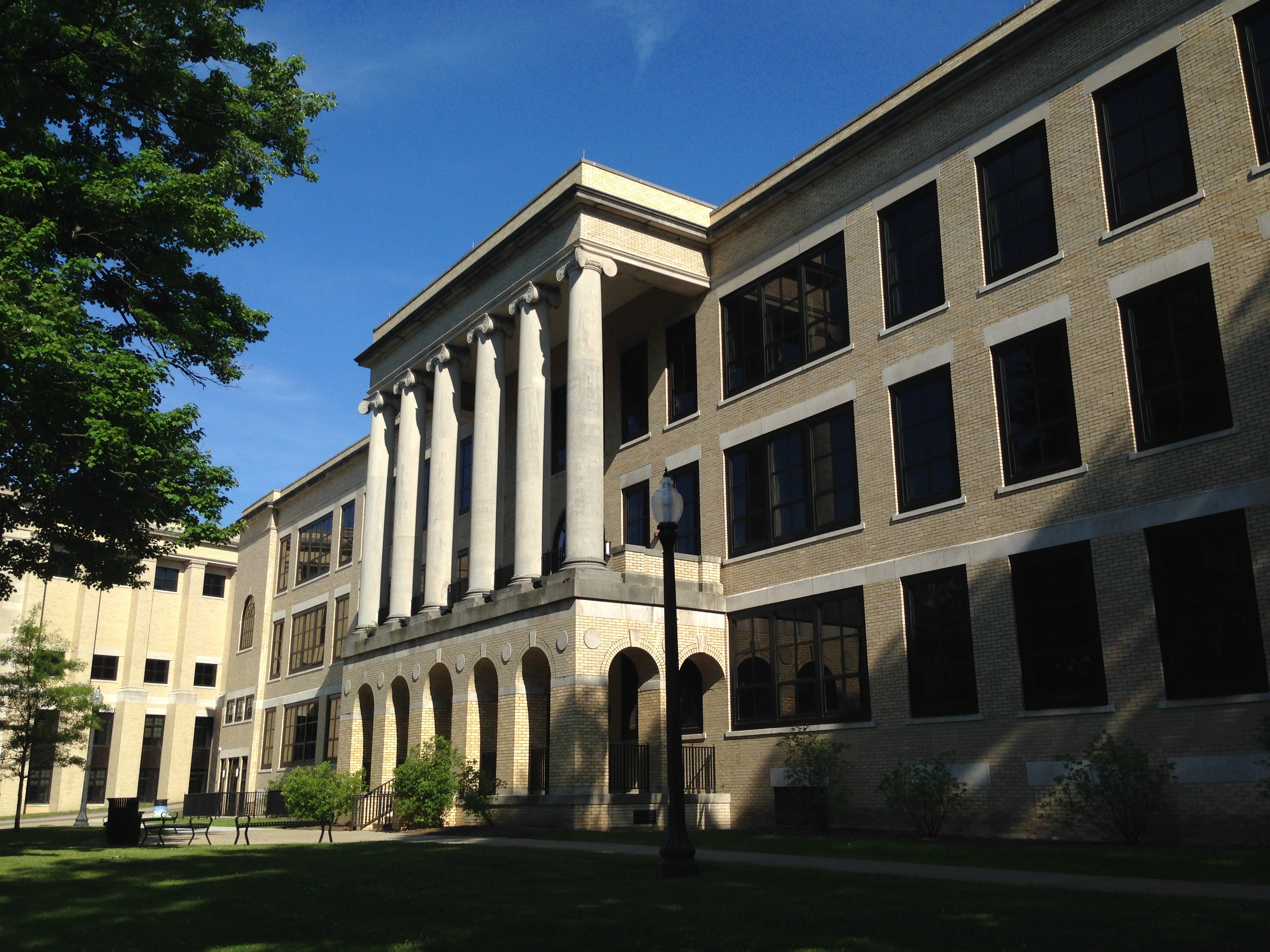
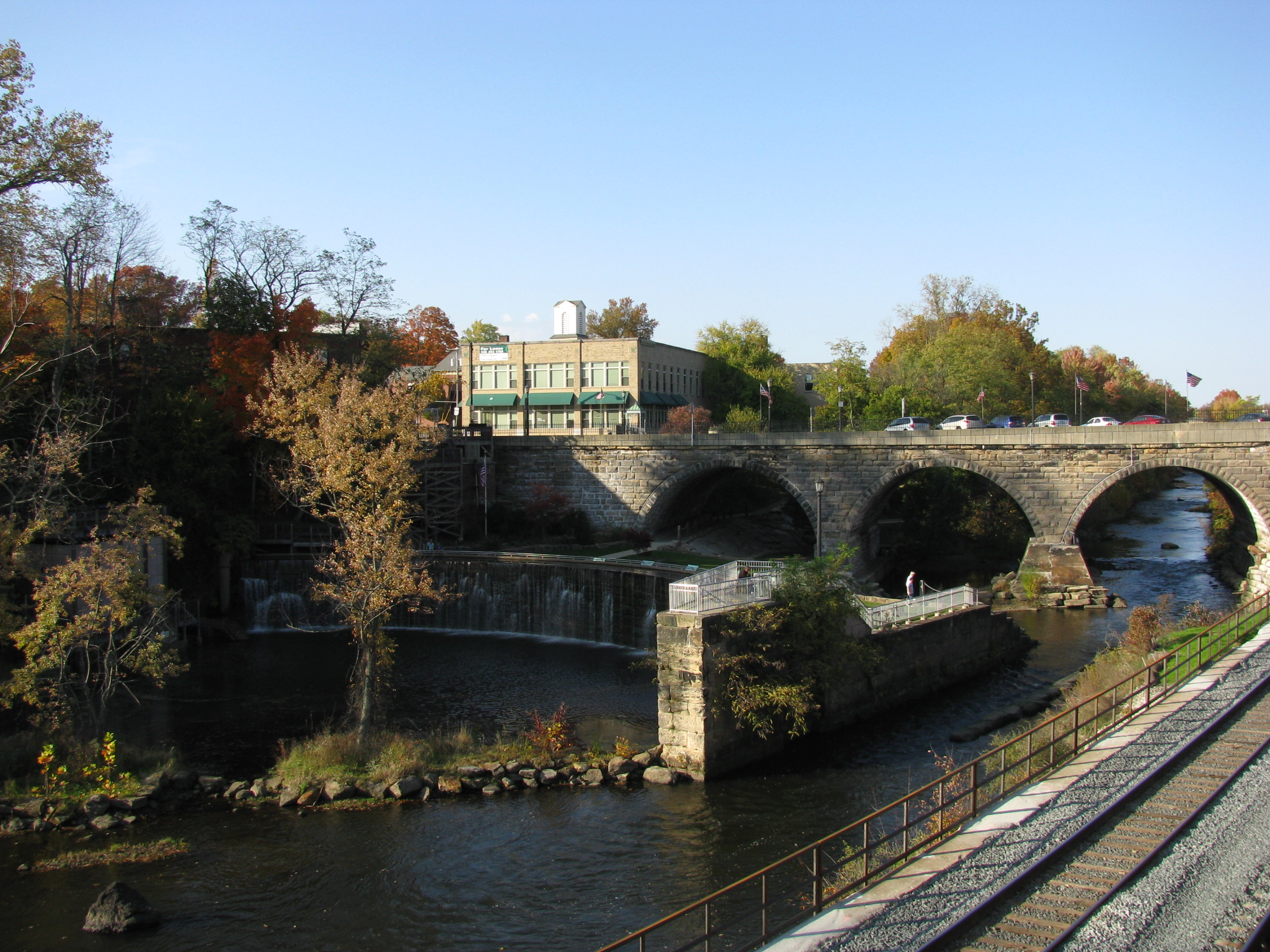
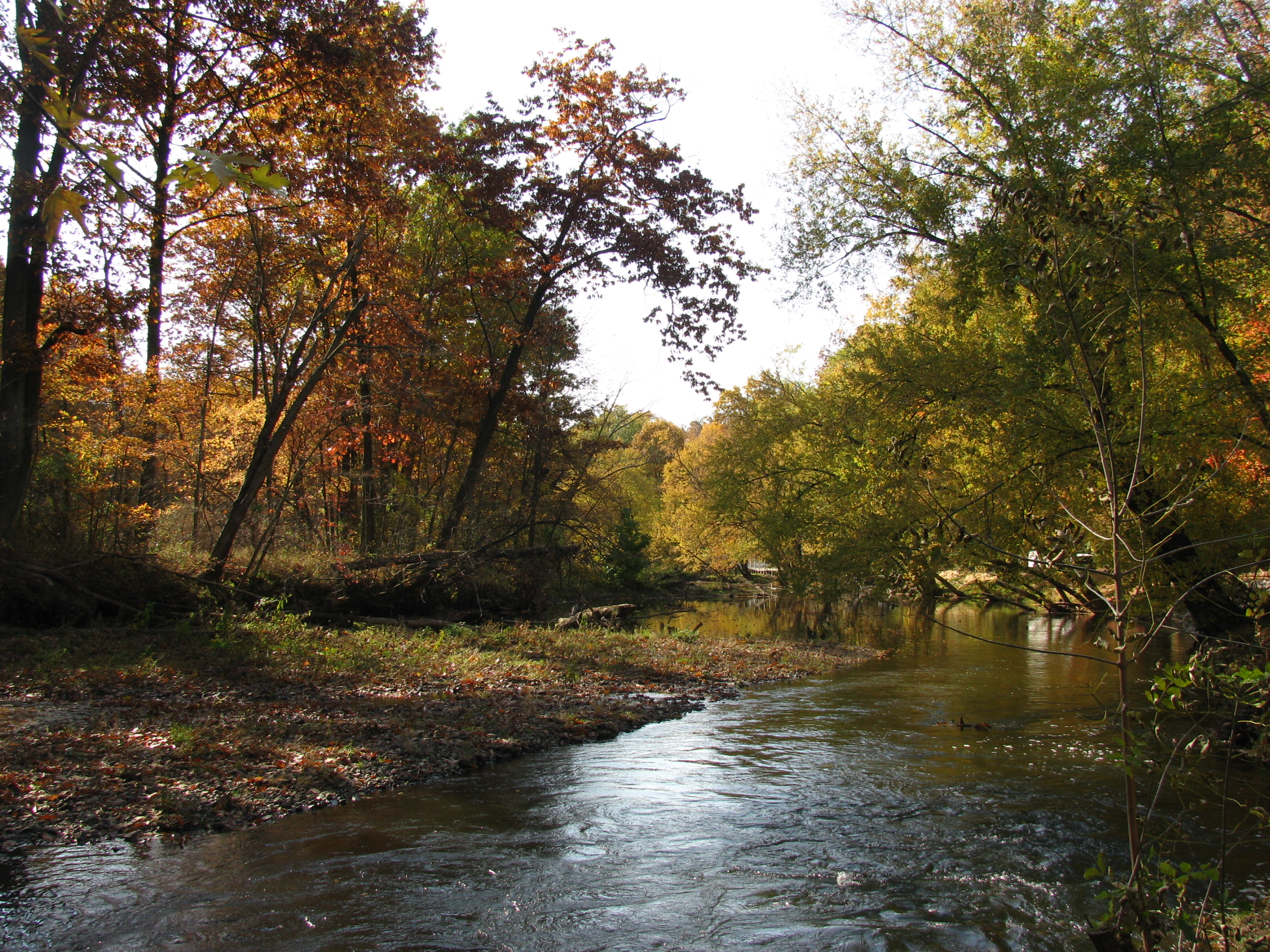
- Top from left: old Erie Depot and Star of the West mill, Franklin Hotel, Dix Stadium, Theodore Roosevelt High School, Kent Hall, Main Street Bridge and arch dam, Cuyahoga River

- Flag Seal Logo
- Nickname: The Tree City
- Interactive map of Kent, Ohio
- Location within Ohio Location within the United States
- Coordinates: 41°08′57″N 81°21′39″W
- Country: United States
- State: Ohio
- County: Portage
- Founded: November 1805
- Incorporated: 1867
- Founder: John and Sally Haymaker
- Named for: Marvin Kent

Government
  - Type: Council–Manager
  - City Manager: Dave Ruller
  - Mayor: Jack Amrhein (D)

Area
  - Total: 9.33 sq mi (24.17 km^{2})
  - Land: 9.22 sq mi (23.89 km^{2})
  - Water: 0.11 sq mi (0.28 km^{2})
- Elevation: 1,056 ft (322 m)

Population (2020)
  - Total: 28,215
  - Density: 3,059.4/sq mi (1,181.23/km^{2})
- Demonym: Kentite
- Time zone: UTC−5 (EST)
  - Summer (DST): UTC−4 (EDT)
- ZIP codes: 44240, 44242, 44243
- Area codes: 330, 234
- FIPS code: 39-39872
- GNIS feature ID: 2395512
- Website: kentohio.gov

Kent is a city in the U.S. state of Ohio and the largest city in Portage County. It is located along the Cuyahoga River in Northeast Ohio on the western edge of the county. The population was 28,215 at the 2020 census. The city is counted as part of the Akron metropolitan area and the larger Cleveland–Akron–Canton combined statistical area.

Part of the Connecticut Western Reserve, Kent was settled in 1805 and was known for many years as Franklin Mills. Settlers were attracted to the area due to its location along the Cuyahoga River as a place for water-powered mills. Later development came in the 1830s and 1840s as a result of the settlement's position along the route of the Pennsylvania and Ohio Canal. Leading up to the American Civil War, Franklin Mills was noted for its activity in the Underground Railroad. With the decline of the canal and the emergence of the railroad, the town became the home of the Atlantic and Great Western Railroad maintenance shops through the influence of Marvin Kent. In 1864 the town was renamed Kent in honor of Marvin Kent's efforts. It was incorporated as a village in 1867 and became a city after the 1920 Census. Today Kent is a college town best known as the home of the main campus of Kent State University, founded in 1910, and as the site of the May 4, 1970 Kent State shootings.

Historically a manufacturing center, education is the city's largest economic sector with Kent State University being the city's, and one of the region's, largest employers. The Kent City School District and the Kent Free Library provide additional education opportunities and resources. Many of Kent's demographic elements are influenced by the presence of the university, particularly the median age, median income, and those living below the poverty level. The city is governed by a council-manager system with a city manager, a nine-member city council, and a mayor. Kent has nearly 20 parks and preserves and hosts a number of annual festivals including ones related to Earth Day, folk music, and the U.S. Independence Day. In addition to the Kent State athletic teams, the city also hosts a number of amateur and local sporting events. Kent is part of the Cleveland–Akron media market and is the city of license for three local radio stations and two television stations and includes the regional member stations for National Public Radio (NPR) and the Public Broadcasting Service (PBS). Local transportation infrastructure includes a public bus service and hike-and-bike trails. As the home of the Davey Tree Expert Company, Kent is known as "The Tree City" while residents are referred to as "Kentites". The city has produced a number of notable individuals, particularly in politics, athletics, and the entertainment industry.

== History ==
The region was originally inhabited by Native Americans, including the early Mound Builders. Around 1780, Captain Samuel Brady achieved notoriety for his activities in the area, including his leap of 21 feet (6 m) over the Cuyahoga River to avoid capture by a Native band. The site, known as Brady's Leap, is now a city park. Settlement by Europeans began in the late 1790s and early 19th century. As part of the Connecticut Western Reserve, the area was divided into survey townships in 1798 and almost all of what is now Kent was originally part of Town 3 Range 9, which would eventually be known as Franklin Township. Aaron Olmsted, a wealthy Connecticut merchant, had purchased the 16,000-acre (6,500 ha) township and named it for his son Aaron Franklin Olmsted.

Franklin Township was surveyed in 1803 and settled in November 1805 when John and Sally Haymaker and their three children moved west from Warren to the banks of the Cuyahoga River. They were joined by John's brother George and their father Jacob Haymaker and their families early the next year, and built a gristmill in 1807. Initial growth in the area was slow, but eventually two small villages developed due to the potential for power generated by the Cuyahoga River to be used in gristmills and manufacturing. The first village, known as Franklin Mills, or locally as the "Lower Village", developed mostly around the original Haymaker property. In 1818, Joshua Woodard arrived in the area and began constructing buildings just north of the village forming the "Upper Village" that would be known briefly as Carthage.

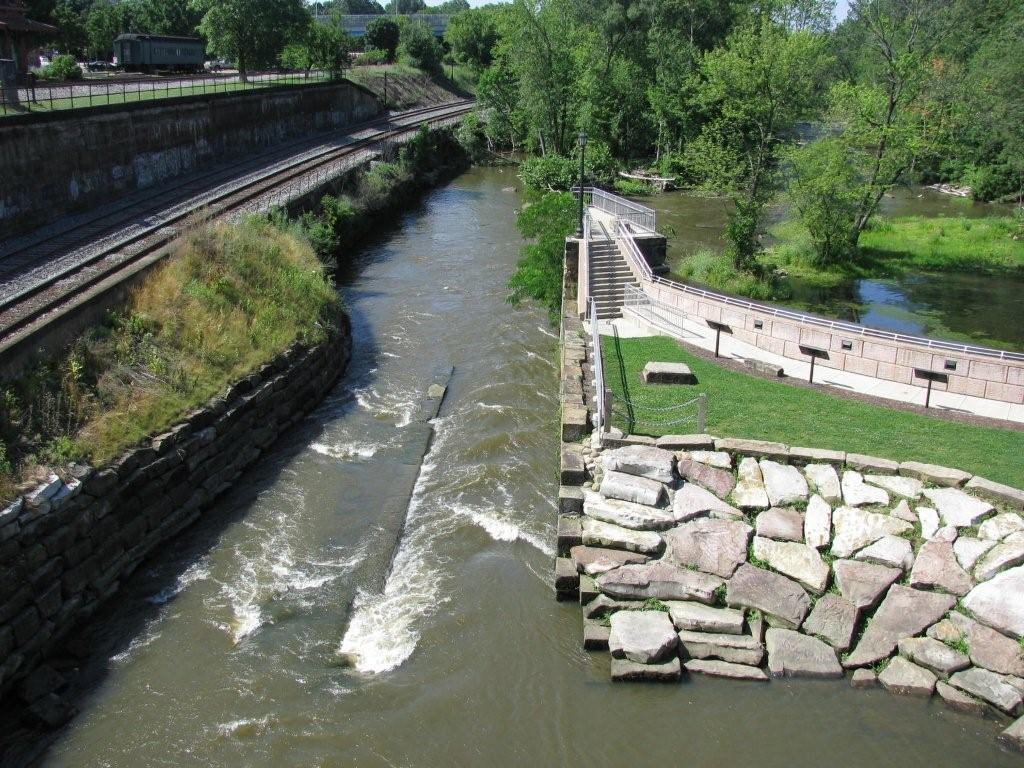
Former P & O Canal lock and dam downtown

In the 1820s, Franklin Mills was included in the route of the Pennsylvania and Ohio Canal (P & O Canal). When construction began on the canal in the mid-1830s, land speculation was rampant in many areas of northeast Ohio along the canal, including Franklin Mills. As a result, an industrial and business region was established along the east side of the river in what is now downtown Kent. Factories and mills were either planned or constructed along the Cuyahoga River, some of which either were never built or ultimately failed, due mostly to effects of the Panic of 1837. A lock and attached arch dam was completed in 1836. The canal officially opened in 1840, but was shut down by the 1870s.

Leading up to the American Civil War, Franklin Mills had three notable stops on the Underground Railroad, giving fugitive slaves shelter on their escape to Canada; one still stands as of 2010. From 1835 to 1839, noted American abolitionist John Brown moved to the village, partnering with Zenas Kent to build a tannery along the Cuyahoga River.

In 1863 the Atlantic and Great Western Railroad was constructed through Franklin Mills, due largely to the efforts of local businessman Marvin Kent, son of Zenas Kent. Marvin Kent had started his own railroad company, the Franklin and Warren Railroad, in 1851 after Franklin Mills was bypassed by the Cleveland and Pittsburgh Railroad. Kent was also successful in getting the village named as the location of the railroad's maintenance yards and shops in 1864. The geographic location along the railroad and being home to the shops reinvented and revitalized the village as an important stop on the line between St. Louis and New York City. The shops opened in 1865 and the railroad played an important part of Kent's industry and development through the early 20th century before the shops were completely shut down in 1930. To honor Marvin Kent, the village was renamed Kent in 1864, although this change was not official until the village was incorporated on May 6, 1867.

John Davey came to Kent in 1881 as head groundskeeper at Standing Rock Cemetery. In 1901, he published his theories on tree surgery with his book The Tree Doctor, and later established the Davey Tree Expert Company in 1909. The efforts of Davey and the presence of Davey Tree led to "The Tree City" being established as a nickname for Kent, which is reflected in the city's seal. The company continues to be headquartered in Kent and serves as the city's largest private employer.

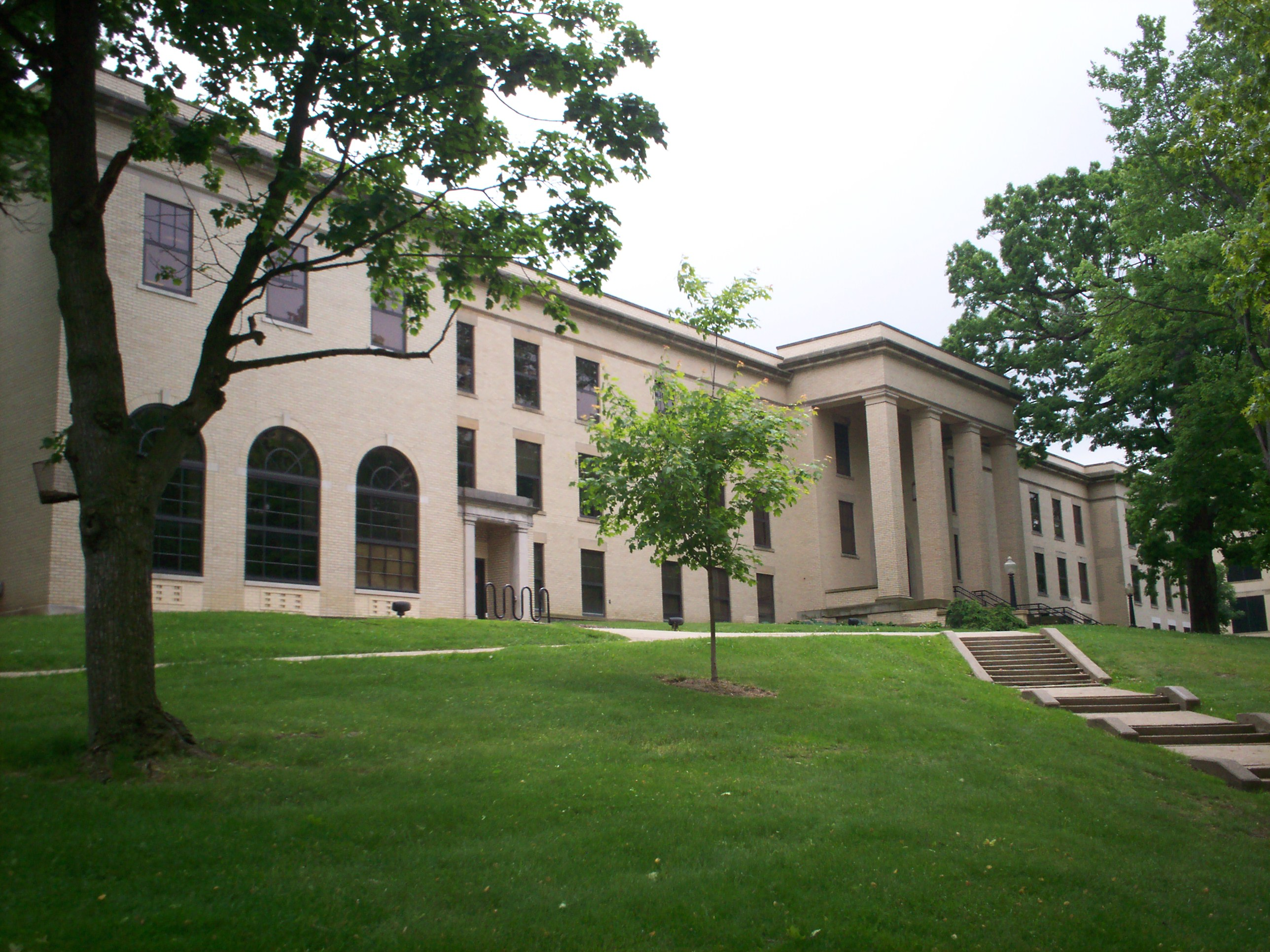
Lowry Hall, one of the original campus buildings of Kent State University

After a fire destroyed the Seneca Chain Company in 1909, one of the city's main industries at the time, city leaders created the Kent Board of Trade in 1910, a forerunner to the Chamber of Commerce. The new Board was successful later that year in having Kent selected out of twenty northeastern Ohio cities as the site of a new teacher training college, which became known as the "Kent State Normal School". The site for the school was on 53 acres (21 ha) of land donated by William S. Kent, son of Marvin Kent, on what was then the eastern edge of town. By 1929 the school was renamed Kent State College after the establishment of a college of liberal arts and degrees in the arts and sciences and in 1935 was renamed Kent State University after it was given authorization to grant advanced graduate degrees. The bill giving Kent State university status was signed into law by Ohio governor and Kent native Martin L. Davey, son of John Davey. During the 1950s and 1960s the growth of Kent State University combined with the effects of suburbanization resulted in significant population growth for the city, rising from just over 12,000 residents at the 1950 census to over 28,000 by 1970. Black squirrels were brought to the campus from Canada in 1961 by Kent State University head groundskeeper Larry Woodell. The squirrels have become an icon for both KSU and the city.

In May 1970, protests began on the campus of Kent State University over the United States' invasion of Cambodia in the Vietnam War. These protests, which included rioting in downtown Kent on May 2, culminated in the Kent State shootings on May 4, 1970, where four students were killed and nine were wounded by the Ohio Army National Guard. Several memorials have been placed at the site over the years and commemorations have been held annually since 1971. In 2010 the site was listed on the National Register of Historic Places. Also during the late 1960s and into the 1970s, construction of Haymaker Parkway, completed in 1975, brought changes to the city's layout while eliminating ongoing problems with traffic congestion and blocked rail crossings.

Kent received national attention in 1995 when the city's water was named "Best Tasting Municipality Water" at the Berkeley Springs International Water Tasting. The water and mayor Kathleen Chandler were featured on the March 3 episode of The Tonight Show with Jay Leno. Since then, Kent has placed in the top five six times with the most recent being a fifth-place finish in 2011. In 2003, the 1836 arch dam was bypassed to meet water quality standards set by the Ohio Environmental Protection Agency. To preserve the historic dam, a small park was built behind the dam and the river was rerouted through the old canal lock. During warm-weather months, water is pumped over the dam. The park, known as Heritage Park, was formally dedicated in May 2005.

From 1881 to 2016, downtown Kent was home to a flour mill, housed in a complex originally built from 1880 to 1881 by the Williams brothers and later acquired by the Star of the West Milling Company. The mill closed in 2016 after Star of the West consolidated operations to Willard, Ohio, and the complex was sold to a local developer in 2019. On December 2, 2022, part of the complex caught fire. The fire destroyed part of the original 1881 mill building and the grain elevator, built in 1890, and damaged other parts of the complex.

=== Redevelopment ===
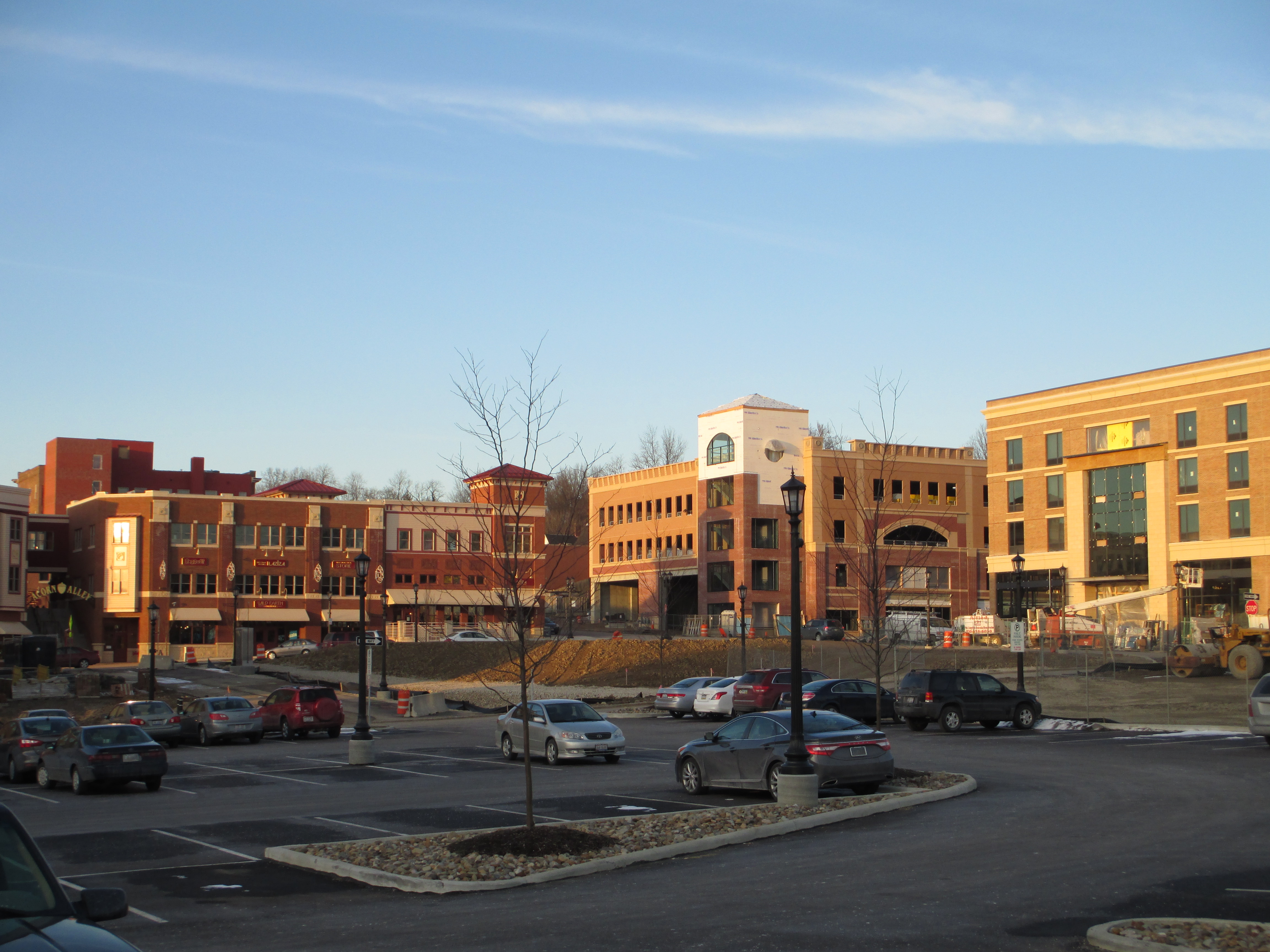
Downtown developments completed or under construction in March 2013

Beginning in 2008, several redevelopment projects in the downtown area were put into motion and resulted in nearly $110 million (~$157 million in 2024) in total investment from public and private sources. The first of these was the Phoenix Project, a development privately financed by Kent resident Ron Burbick that renovated and expanded a section of commercial space along East Main Street. Included in the project was construction of a pedestrian alleyway lined with small shops, eventually known as Acorn Alley, which opened in 2009. A second phase of Acorn Alley opened in late 2011. Other aspects of the redevelopment, which include a 360-space parking deck and bus transfer station, a hotel and conference center, and three separate mixed-use buildings, began to take shape in 2010 following the demolition of several buildings in a four block area. New offices for Ametek and the Davey Tree Expert Company opened in late 2012 along with several new small businesses on the first floors of each building. The hotel, operated by Kent State University, opened in June 2013 and the new parking garage, operated by the Portage Area Regional Transportation Authority (PARTA) opened April 30, 2013, as the Kent Central Gateway. In addition to parking, the facility functions as PARTA's main bus transfer station and has storefronts on the ground level facing East Erie Street. Included in the redevelopment was the purchase and renovation of the old Kent hotel, which first opened in 1920. After being vacant since 2000, it re-opened on April 1, 2013, as a Buffalo Wild Wings and also houses offices, a wine and jazz bar, and apartments. A five-story mixed-use building called The Landmark was completed in 2014 and construction started in November 2015 on an additional five-story mixed-use building featuring microapartments. The developments attracted the attention of The Plain Dealer and The New York Times and earned the city and university the 2013 Larry Abernathy Award from the International Town–Gown Association in recognition of the positive town–gown cooperation and collaboration.

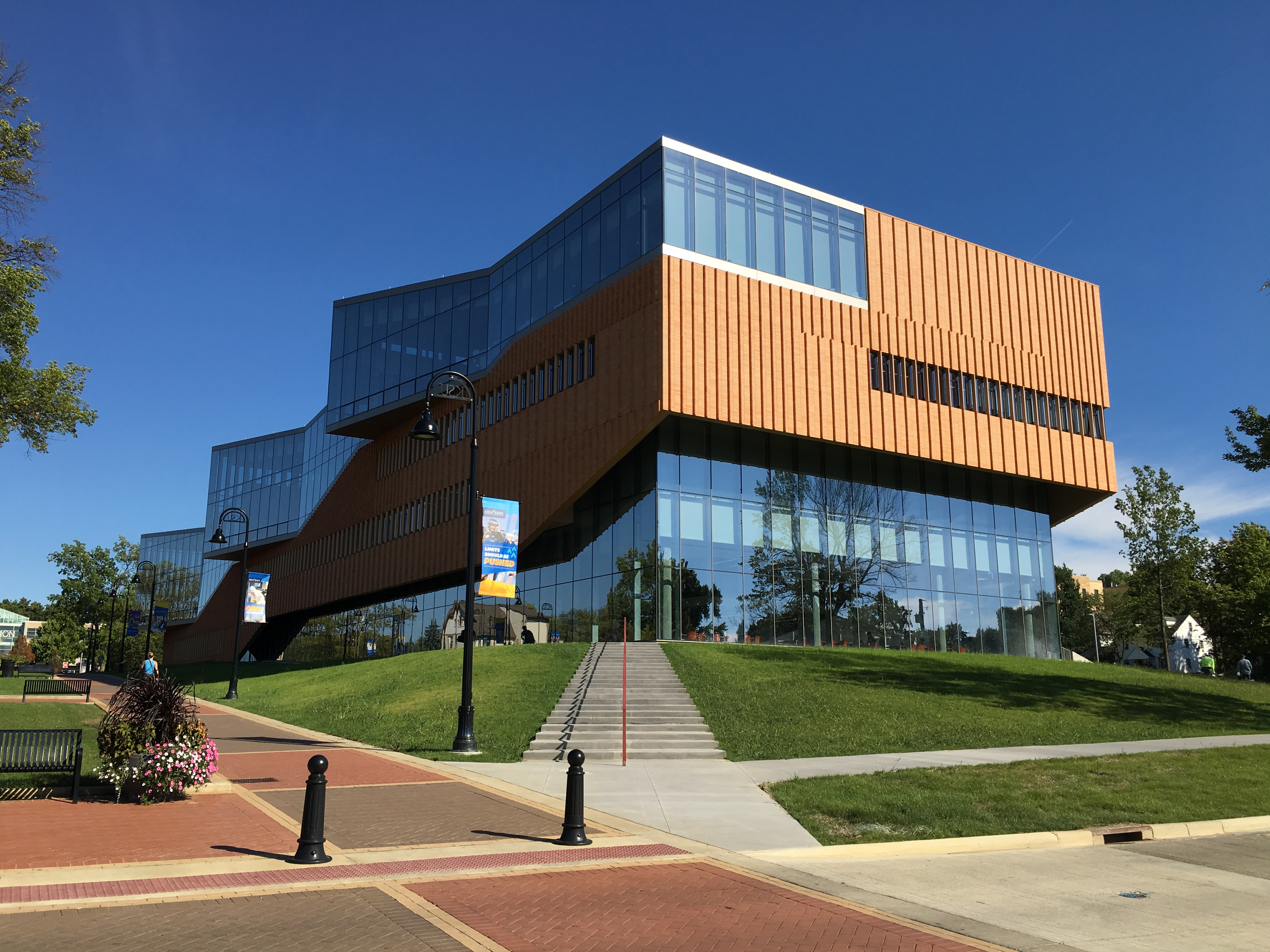
KSU College of Architecture and Environmental Design building, completed in 2016

Additional development has been ongoing on the campus of Kent State University and the largely residential neighborhood between downtown Kent and the western edge of campus. The university began buying properties in that neighborhood in 2007 and by December 2012 had acquired 43. Construction of the University Esplanade extension, designed to link campus with downtown, started in August 2012 after several of the buildings in the area, most of which had been rental homes, were demolished or moved. The Esplanade extension continued a segment of the Portage Hike and Bike Trail that extends to Dix Stadium and was completed in October 2013. Kent State constructed a $48 million, 110,091 square feet (10,227.8 m^{2}) facility for the College of Architecture and Environmental Design along the Esplanade extension and also relocated the former home of May Prentice, the first female faculty member at Kent State, to the extension as the home for the Wick Poetry Center. Construction on the architecture building started in October 2014 and was completed in August 2016. A new 55,000 square feet (5,100 m^{2}) facility for the College of Aeronautics and Technology opened in January 2015, but rapid enrollment growth of the program led to the university approving expansion of the facility in 2021, with a new 44,000 square feet (4,100 m^{2}) addition scheduled to be completed in 2023. The university is also constructing Crawford Hall, a new facility for the Ambassador Crawford College of Business and Entrepreneurship, set to open in 2024.

A new county municipal courthouse on East Main Street was completed in April 2014, and in 2015, Kent City Council approved the sale of the city hall complex to a private developer for construction of a five-story apartment building on the site, which opened in August 2016. A new city hall is being constructed on the site of the previous police station, a building that was originally built as the main fire station and was also used for city hall various times. The new city hall is expected to open in July 2024.

== Geography ==
Kent is located in west-central Portage County in Northeast Ohio approximately 10 miles (20 km) northeast of Akron and 30 miles (50 km) southeast of Cleveland. It is bordered by Franklin Township on the north and east, the unincorporated community of Brady Lake on the east, Brimfield Township on the south, and Stow on the west. Other nearby communities include Ravenna to the east and Sugar Bush Knolls and Streetsboro to the north. It is included in the Akron Metropolitan Statistical Area and the larger Cleveland–Akron–Canton Combined Statistical Area.

Located on the western end of the Glaciated Allegheny Plateau, the topography of Kent includes rolling hills and varied terrain. The Cuyahoga River passes through the city, cutting a gorge with a drop of nearly 40 feet (10 m) adjacent to the downtown area. The United States Geological Survey lists the city's elevation at 1,056 feet (322 m) above sea level at a point near Kent's geographic center. Elevations vary slightly within the city limits with several buildings on the Kent State University campus at altitudes in excess of 1,160 feet (350 m) and points as high as 1,200 feet (370 m). According to the United States Census Bureau, as of 2010 the city has a total area of 9.28 square miles (24.04 km^{2}), of which 9.17 square miles (23.75 km^{2}) is land and 0.11 square miles (0.28 km^{2}) is water.

=== Climate ===
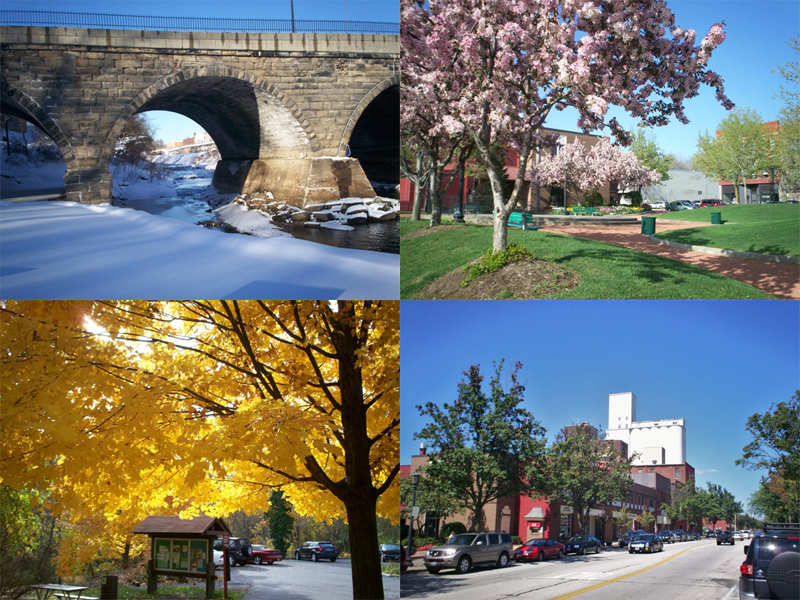
The four main seasons in Kent, from top left clockwise: winter, spring, summer, and fall

Kent's climate is classified as a humid continental climate (Köppen climate classification Dfa) meaning it typically has very warm, humid summers and cold, snowy winters with moderate and variable springs and autumns. The record high temperature is 103 °F (39 °C), set on July 7, 1988, with the record low of −22 °F (−30 °C) recorded January 17, 1982. During the spring and summer, thunderstorms are fairly common and the area is susceptible to tornadoes, though the last recorded tornado in Kent occurred in 1973. Effects from tropical systems can also be felt, usually taking the form of increased humidity, rain, and wind, such as with the remnants of Hurricane Ike in September 2008. During the winter months, snowfall is common and can occur in large quantities reaching up to or occasionally above 12 inches (30 centimeters) with considerable cloud cover. Kent is not considered part of the Lake Erie snowbelt, though lake-effect snow does occur. The city is in what is referred to as the "secondary snowbelt", meaning it will receive heavier snowfall totals from lake-effect snow when certain wind directions are more prevalent, but typically sees far less snowfall than areas closer to Lake Erie. While temperatures below the freezing point are typical in the winter months, thaw periods where temperatures exceed 50 °F (10 °C) and even 60 °F (16 °C) are not uncommon in January and February.

Climate data for Kent, Ohio
Month	Jan	Feb	Mar	Apr	May	Jun	Jul	Aug	Sep	Oct	Nov	Dec	Year
Record high °F (°C)	65 (18)	70 (21)	81 (27)	88 (31)	94 (34)	101 (38)	103 (39)	100 (38)	95 (35)	84 (29)	76 (24)	72 (22)	103 (39)
Mean daily maximum °F (°C)	34 (1)	38 (3)	48 (9)	60 (16)	72 (22)	80 (27)	84 (29)	82 (28)	74 (23)	62 (17)	50 (10)	39 (4)	60 (16)
Mean daily minimum °F (°C)	20 (−7)	23 (−5)	30 (−1)	40 (4)	51 (11)	60 (16)	64 (18)	63 (17)	56 (13)	45 (7)	36 (2)	26 (−3)	43 (6)
Record low °F (°C)	−22 (−30)	−6 (−21)	1 (−17)	17 (−8)	30 (−1)	39 (4)	44 (7)	43 (6)	30 (−1)	25 (−4)	2 (−17)	−12 (−24)	−22 (−30)
Average precipitation inches (mm)	2.02 (51)	2.00 (51)	2.85 (72)	3.15 (80)	3.61 (92)	3.13 (80)	3.87 (98)	3.36 (85)	3.57 (91)	2.46 (62)	3.22 (82)	2.83 (72)	36.07 (916)
Average snowfall inches (cm)	12.4 (31)	10.5 (27)	8.2 (21)	2.7 (6.9)	0.1 (0.25)	0.0 (0.0)	0.0 (0.0)	0.0 (0.0)	0.0 (0.0)	0.4 (1.0)	3.0 (7.6)	10.2 (26)	47.5 (120.75)
Source 1: Intellicast
Source 2: NOAA

== Demographics ==
Historical population
Census	Pop.	Note	%±
1870	2,301		—
1880	3,309		43.8%
1890	3,501		5.8%
1900	4,541		29.7%
1910	4,488		−1.2%
1920	7,070		57.5%
1930	8,377		18.5%
1940	8,581		2.4%
1950	12,418		44.7%
1960	17,836		43.6%
1970	28,183		58.0%
1980	26,164		−7.2%
1990	28,835		10.2%
2000	27,906		−3.2%
2010	28,904		3.6%
2020	28,215		−2.4%

As a college town, Kent's demographic and population statistics are greatly affected by the presence and growth of Kent State University. As a result, several statistics are noticeably higher or lower than state and national averages including median age and the percentage of residents in the 18–24 age bracket, individuals below the poverty line, and percentage of residents with a college degree.

Initial population growth in Kent was influenced by the location on the Cuyahoga River which led to the development of industrial and manufacturing jobs. Early settlers mainly came from the northeastern United States and were largely of German descent. After the arrival of the Atlantic and Great Western Railroad in 1863, growth was steady into the early 20th century with the village battling Ravenna for the position of Portage County's largest city. By the 1930 Census, Kent had passed Ravenna as the county's most populous city with even larger population growth in the 1950s and 1960s rising from 12,148 in 1950 to 28,183 by 1970. Most recent population measurements of the city have shown the effect of changes in the city's overall population coinciding with changes in the number of students living on campus as well as a reduction in the number of persons per housing unit.

=== Racial and ethnic composition ===
Kent city, Ohio – Racial and ethnic composition Note: the US Census treats Hispanic/Latino as an ethnic category. This table excludes Latinos from the racial categories and assigns them to a separate category. Hispanics/Latinos may be of any race.
Race / Ethnicity (NH = Non-Hispanic)	Pop 2000	Pop 2010	Pop 2020	% 2000	% 2010	% 2020
White alone (NH)	23,807	23,595	21,502	85.31%	81.63%	76.21%
Black or African American alone (NH)	2,533	2,744	2,812	9.08%	9.49%	9.97%
Native American or Alaska Native alone (NH)	50	45	74	0.18%	0.16%	0.26%
Asian alone (NH)	595	1,060	1,308	2.13%	3.67%	4.64%
Native Hawaiian or Pacific Islander alone (NH)	5	12	7	0.02%	0.04%	0.02%
Other race alone (NH)	47	48	97	0.17%	0.17%	0.34%
Mixed race or Multiracial (NH)	512	758	1,449	1.83%	2.62%	5.14%
Hispanic or Latino (any race)	357	642	966	1.28%	2.22%	3.42%
Total	27,906	28,904	28,215	100.00%	100.00%	100.00%

=== 2020 census ===
As of the 2020 census, Kent had a population of 28,215, for a population density of 3,059.5 people per square mile (1,181.3 people/km^{2}). The 2020 count was a slight decline from 2010, which city leaders attributed to the census being taken just after many student residents left at the onset of COVID-19 pandemic restrictions. Kent remains Portage County's largest city.

The median age was 23.2 years, with 12.2% of residents under the age of 18 and 10.3% 65 years of age or older. The age bracket of 20 to 24 years is the city's largest, accounting for 25% of the total population, and for every 100 females there were 83.7 males, with 82.0 males for every 100 females age 18 and over. The city's population was 46.4% male and 53.6% female, slightly differing from the state and national averages. 99.9% of residents lived in urban areas, while 0.1% lived in rural areas.

There were 10,696 households in Kent, of which 18.3% had children under the age of 18 living in them, 25.8% were married-couple households, 29.1% were households with a male householder and no spouse or partner present, and 37.9% were households with a female householder and no spouse or partner present. About 39.6% of all households were made up of individuals, and 10.4% had someone living alone who was 65 years of age or older. The average household size in Kent was 2.2 and the average family size was 2.86. Kent has 12,052 housing units as of 2020, of which 11.3% were vacant; the homeowner vacancy rate was 1.2% and the rental vacancy rate was 9.2%. Kent's 42.7% rate of owner-occupied housing is significantly below the percentages for the US, Ohio, and Portage County.

Between the 2010 and 2020 censuses, the city saw slight increases in the number of minority residents. Kent's racial composition, while more diverse than Portage County, is similar to percentages for the state of Ohio, but less diverse than the national averages.

Racial composition as of the 2020 census
Race	Number	Percent
White	21,702	76.9%
Black or African American	2,841	10.1%
American Indian and Alaska Native	82	0.3%
Asian	1,310	4.6%
Native Hawaiian and Other Pacific Islander	7	0.0%
Some other race	305	1.1%
Two or more races	1,968	7.0%

The median income for a household in the city was $37,505, well below the median household incomes for Ohio ($65,720) and the United States ($75,149). The mean household income in Kent was $67,640, compared to $90,958 for Ohio and $105,833 for the U.S. For families, the mean income in Kent was $100,435 with a median income of $97,250, both of which were closer to the state ($86,508 mean, $110,726 median) and national ($92,646 mean, $124,530 median) averages. 25.5% of the population is below the poverty line, including 19.2% of those under age 18 and 14.8% of those age 65 or over. While the number of individuals below the poverty line is significantly higher than both the state and national averages, measures of high poverty rates in similar college towns, however, is not uncommon across the U.S.

Educationally, Kent is above the national, state, and local averages for residents who have attained a bachelor's, master's, or above a master's degree. At the 2020 Census, 44.5% of Kent's population above the age of 25 had obtained a college degree compared to 31.4% of the same population in Portage County, 30.4% statewide, and 34.3% nationally.

== Economy ==
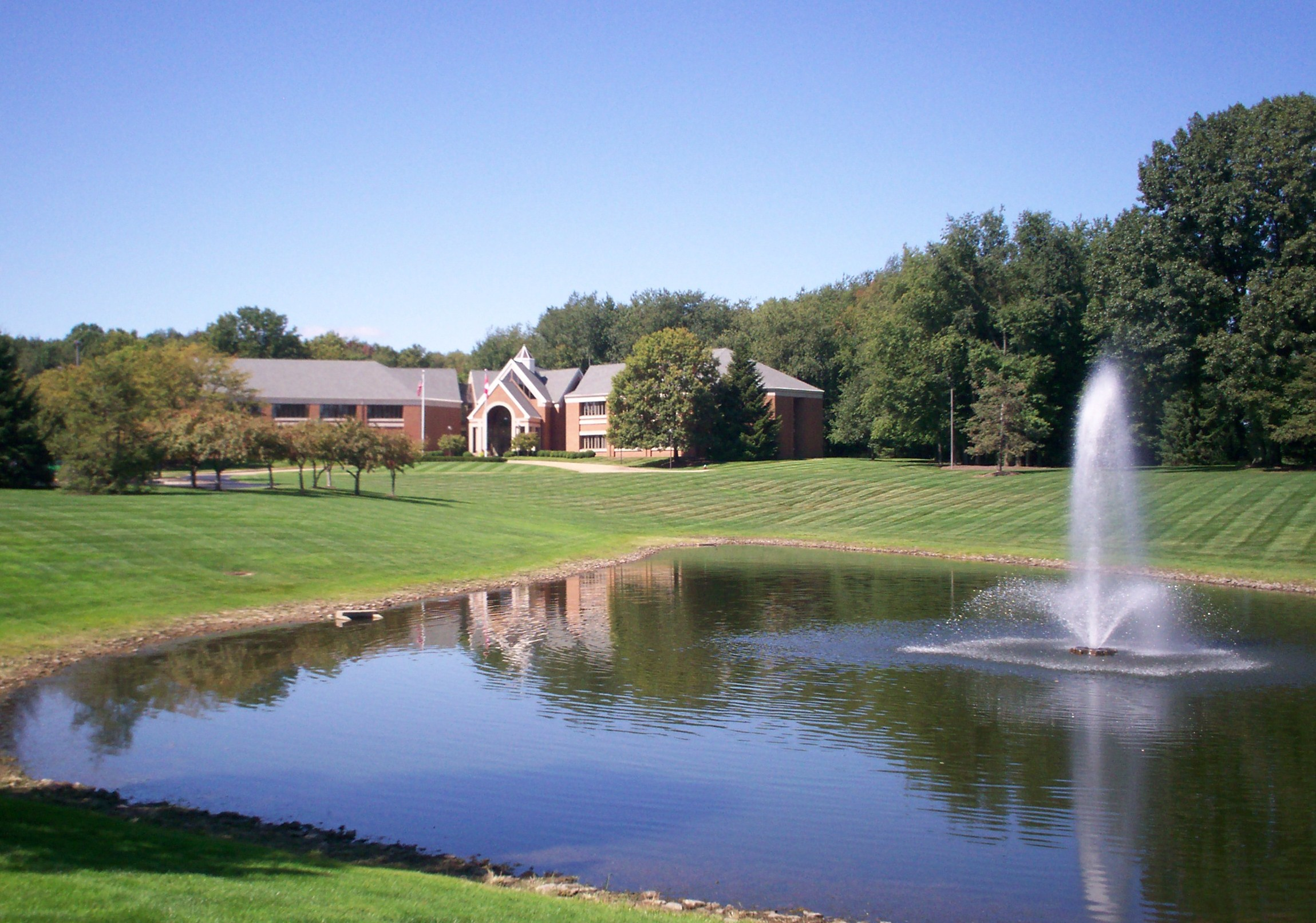
Corporate headquarters of the Davey Tree Expert Company, Kent's largest private employer

Kent's location along the Cuyahoga River and later the Pennsylvania and Ohio Canal and multiple railroad lines made it attractive initially for the establishment of small gristmills and factories. Progressively larger factories later developed due to increased power available from the river and eventually due to the ease and lower cost of transportation of goods to other markets. During the latter half of the 19th century and into the early 20th century, the city's largest employers were all industrially based, including the Atlantic and Great Western Railroad and its successors, which operated its main maintenance shops in the village; the Seneca Chain Company; and bus manufacturer Twin Coach among others. A fire at the Seneca Chain Company in 1909 led to the creation of the Kent Board of Trade—an early Chamber of Commerce—which was successful in getting Kent selected in 1910 as the site of what would become Kent State University.

Changes in the structure of the railroad and declines in the manufacturing sector during the mid-20th century combined with the rapid growth of Kent State University following World War II led to the university becoming the city's largest employer and influenced the development of other areas of the city's economy. In the 21st century, the university, along with the city and private investors, began to play a more active role in the redevelopment of downtown Kent and has aided in the development of local high tech companies. Kent State operates Centennial Research Park, along Ohio State Route 59 in Kent's Joint Economic Development District with Franklin Township, which houses two high tech start-up companies in the liquid crystal industry. Kent has an additional Joint Economic Development District with Brimfield Township. Through the Kent Regional Business Alliance, the city also supports two business incubators.

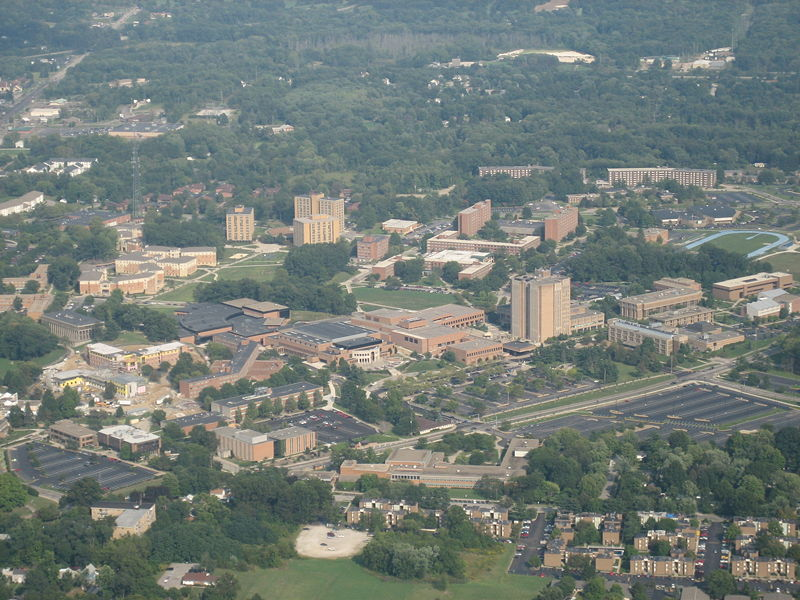
Kent State University, Kent's largest employer

As of 2020, the educational, health, and social services fields were the city's largest sector, and employed 28.4% of Kent's workforce. This included the city's two largest employers, Kent State University and the Kent City School District, as well as University Hospitals Portage Medical Center, which operates an outpatient surgery center and general medical facility. 19.4% of the workforce is employed in arts, entertainment, and food service, with 11.2% employed in retail. Manufacturing accounts for 8.6% of the workforce with a Land O' Lakes plant being the largest employer in the sector. Smithers-Oasis, a floristry manufacturer, was founded in Kent in 1954 and operates a plant in the city. Their corporate offices were moved back to Kent from Cuyahoga Falls in September 2013, having originally moved there from Kent in 1992. Kent is also home to the corporate headquarters of the Davey Tree Expert Company, the city's largest private employer. In 2010 Davey Tree announced plans to relocate staff from its Davey Resource Group, who were previously in neighboring Stow, to Kent as part of a planned downtown development and has stated long-term goals include having all corporate offices in Kent. The office opened in August 2012. Davey added a third wing to its Kent headquarters building in 2022, along with 70 new jobs. It also recently completed a 180-acre (73 ha) training and research campus and arboretum for both employees and the public which is opened in 2025. Most of the land was annexed from Franklin Township and the rest was obtained from the site of the former Franklin Elementary School.

As of 2020, 67.6% of those employed commuted alone to work by way of a car, truck, or van with another 4.9% carpooling. 8.2% of workers walked to work with 1.4% using public transportation and 16.8% working from home. The average commute time was 21.7 minutes. The employment rate for Kent in 2020 was 56.9%

== Culture ==
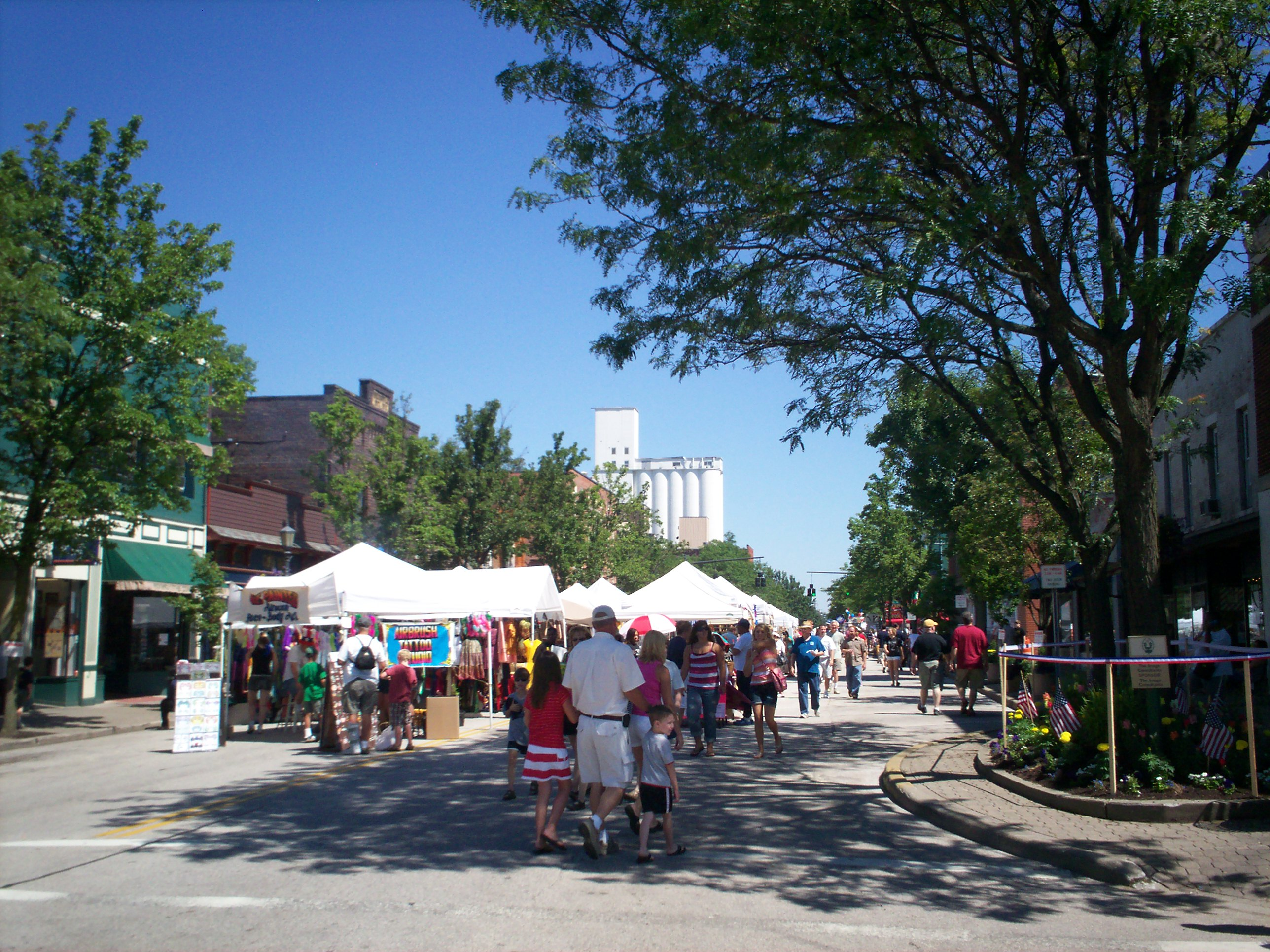
2010 Kent Heritage Festival along South Water Street

Cultural elements in Kent include various arts, environmental, and entertainment events during the year, as well as the Kent State University Museum. The Kent Heritage Festival is held every July in the downtown area, coinciding with the U.S. Independence Day. The festival includes crafts, booths, entertainment, train rides, 5K and 10K races, and fireworks, drawing approximately 25,000 people each year. In October, Kent hosts the homecoming festivities for Kent State University, including a parade down East Main Street as well as other events and activities both on campus and around the city. Also in October, the downtown area hosts an annual, yet unofficial, Halloween celebration, which usually takes place the last Saturday of October. The event typically draws thousands, largely Kent State students, and includes many who dress in costume. In 2007 Main Street Kent, a local organization that promotes downtown Kent, created a family-oriented Halloween event downtown that precedes the unofficial celebration. Since 2007, Kent has hosted an annual environmental festival known as "Who's Your Mama?" which takes place in conjunction with Earth Day. The festival has events at various locations in the city, such as a vegan chef competition, concerts, a film festival, guest speakers, and booths on environment-based topics. Through Main Street Kent, additional events downtown include an ice cream social event in August, an outdoor concert series and "sidewalk cinema" between May and September, an art and wine festival in June, a cider festival in November, and the Festival of Lights Christmas celebration in early December. The Wizardly World of Kent, formerly known as Kent Potterfest, is a festival celebrating the book and movie series Harry Potter and debuted in 2016. It is held annually in the downtown area in late July. It features Harry Potter-themed vendors and activities, a 5k run through Kent State University, a costume contest, and the transformation of Acorn Alley to resemble Diagon Alley. Kent Rainbow Weekend, the city's annual Pride festival, is held in October.

From May to October, the Haymaker Farmers' Market operates every Saturday morning in the downtown area adjacent to and under the Greer Bridge of Haymaker Parkway. The location is marked by a commissioned mural completed in October 2012 on the bridge supports that line each side of the market's area. The market was established in 1992 and includes over 40 vendors, making it one of the oldest and largest farmers' markets in Northeast Ohio. An indoor Winter Market, established in 2008, is held Saturday mornings from November through April.

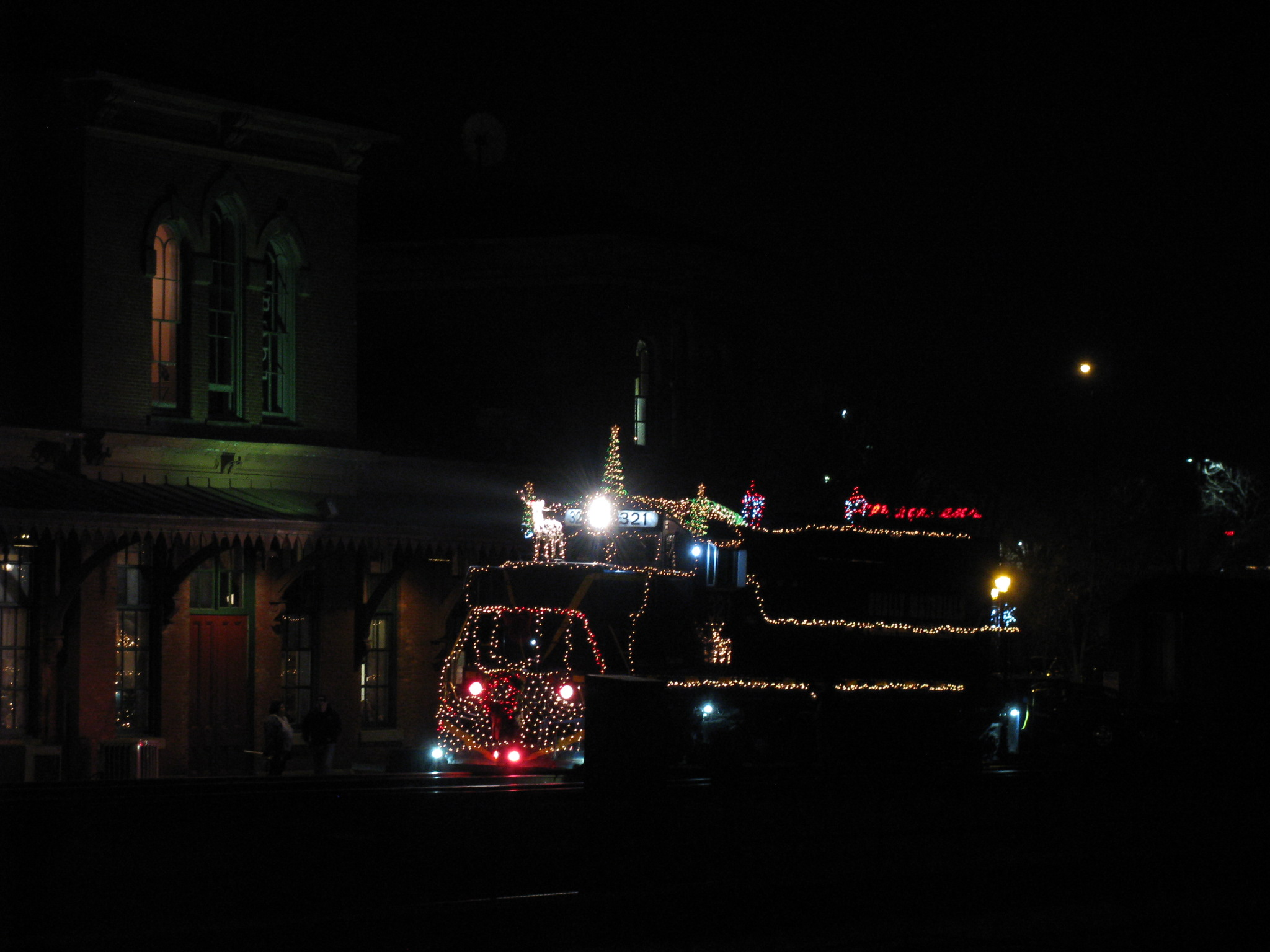
Arrival of Santa Claus by train as part of the annual Festival of Lights in December

The Kent Stage, located downtown, is a performance venue for a variety of arts performances in music and theater. It hosts around 90 concerts, four theatrical performances, and four film festivals or movie premiers per year, including local, national, and international performers. Since opening in 2002, it has been visited by approximately 120,000 patrons from all over Ohio, 38 U.S. states, and 3 countries. In April, it hosts events related to the "Who's Your Mama?" Earth Day festival and in June, it is one of the host venues for the Kent Folk Festival, an annual event in folk music since the late 1960s. The festival includes multiple folk music acts at venues throughout the city over a period of several days. The Kent Stage also hosts the Kent Blues Festival and a local artist music festival known as the Up From The River Music Festival.

Kent is also home to the Kent State University Museum, located in Rockwell Hall on the KSU campus. The museum focuses on the history of fashion design and decorative arts in the United States and around the world from the 18th century to the present. Each year in early May, the university hosts an annual commemoration of the Kent State shootings, which typically features several speakers, forums, artwork, and other related events. On campus, Kent State operates the May 4 Visitors' Center, which covers the shootings and the events surrounding them. It is housed in Taylor Hall on the site added to the National Register of Historic Places in 2010 and includes three galleries covering art and media from the era of the 1960s leading up to the shootings, images from the actual event, and the local and national impact after the shootings. The center opened to the public October 20, 2012, during the Kent State Homecoming weekend. The site was named a National Historic Landmark in December 2016.

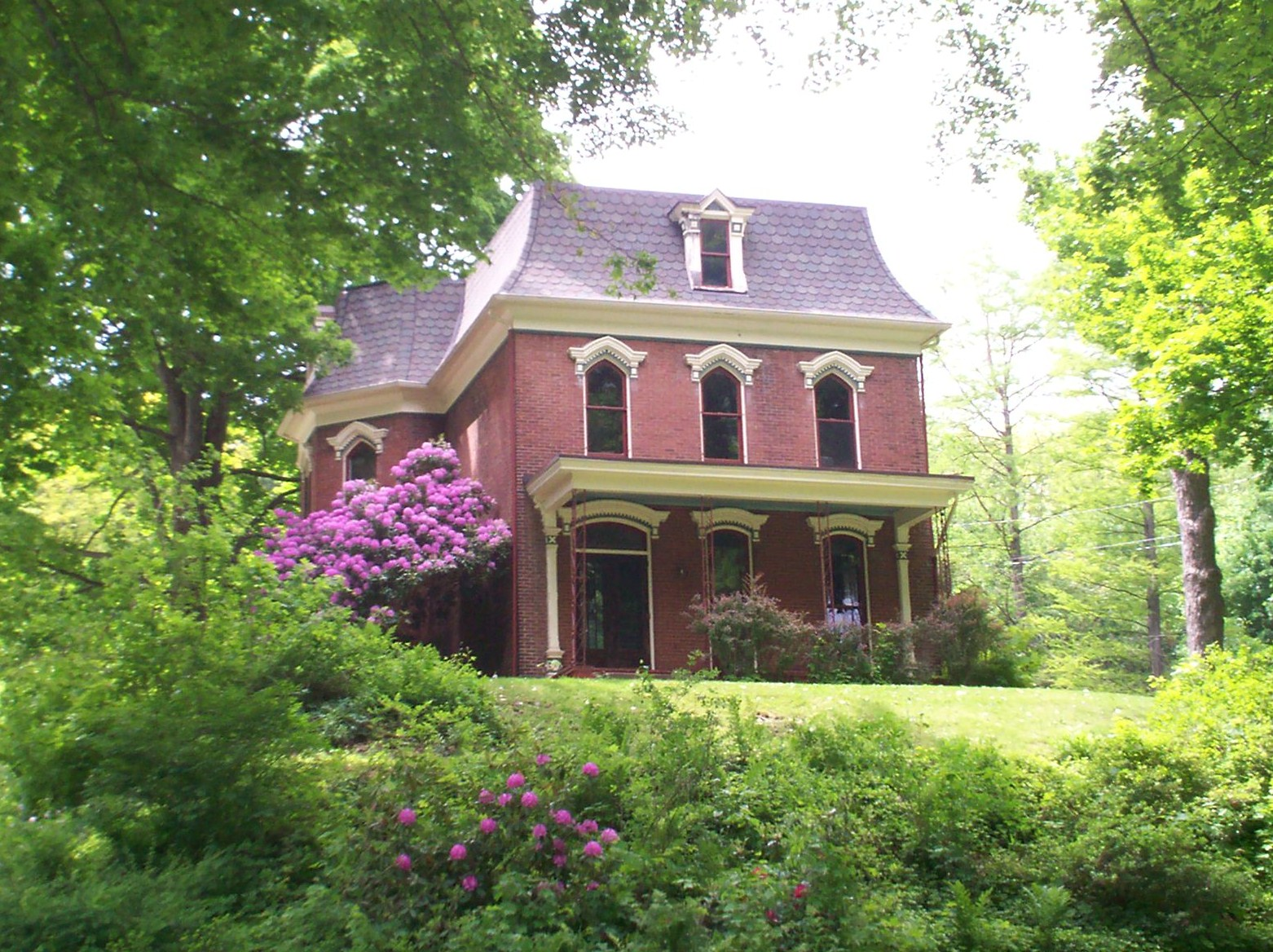
The John Davey House, a listing on the National Register of Historic Places

In addition to the Kent State Shootings Site, there are also a number of additional sites and districts in Kent on the National Register of Historic Places, some of which are open to the public. The Kent Industrial District is a historical district along the Cuyahoga River adjacent to downtown that includes an area and structures that were important in Kent's early history. On the northwestern part of the campus is the Ohio State Normal College At Kent district, which includes the school's five original classic revival buildings dating to 1913. There is also the West Main Street District just west of downtown that includes 20 private homes of architectural and historical significance from the post-Civil War and early 20th century periods. The district includes the Kent Masonic Center, which was originally built in the early 1880s as the home of Marvin Kent, and the former residence of Martin L. Davey. Buildings in Kent listed on the register include three private homes noted for their architecture styles: the John Davey House for the Second Empire style, and both the Aaron Ferrey and Charles Kent Houses as examples of Gothic Revival. Other buildings include the 1869 Kent Jail, now used by the Parks and Recreation Department, and the 1837 Franklin Township Hall, the site of eventual U.S. President James A. Garfield's first nomination for public office in 1859. As part of its renovation and redevelopment, the former Franklin Hotel, first opened in 1920, was added to the NRHP in 2013 for its local historical significance and its connections to notable people. The former L.N. Gross Company Building, built in 1928 and designed by Kent architect Charles Kistler, was added to the NRHP in 2016.

== Sports ==
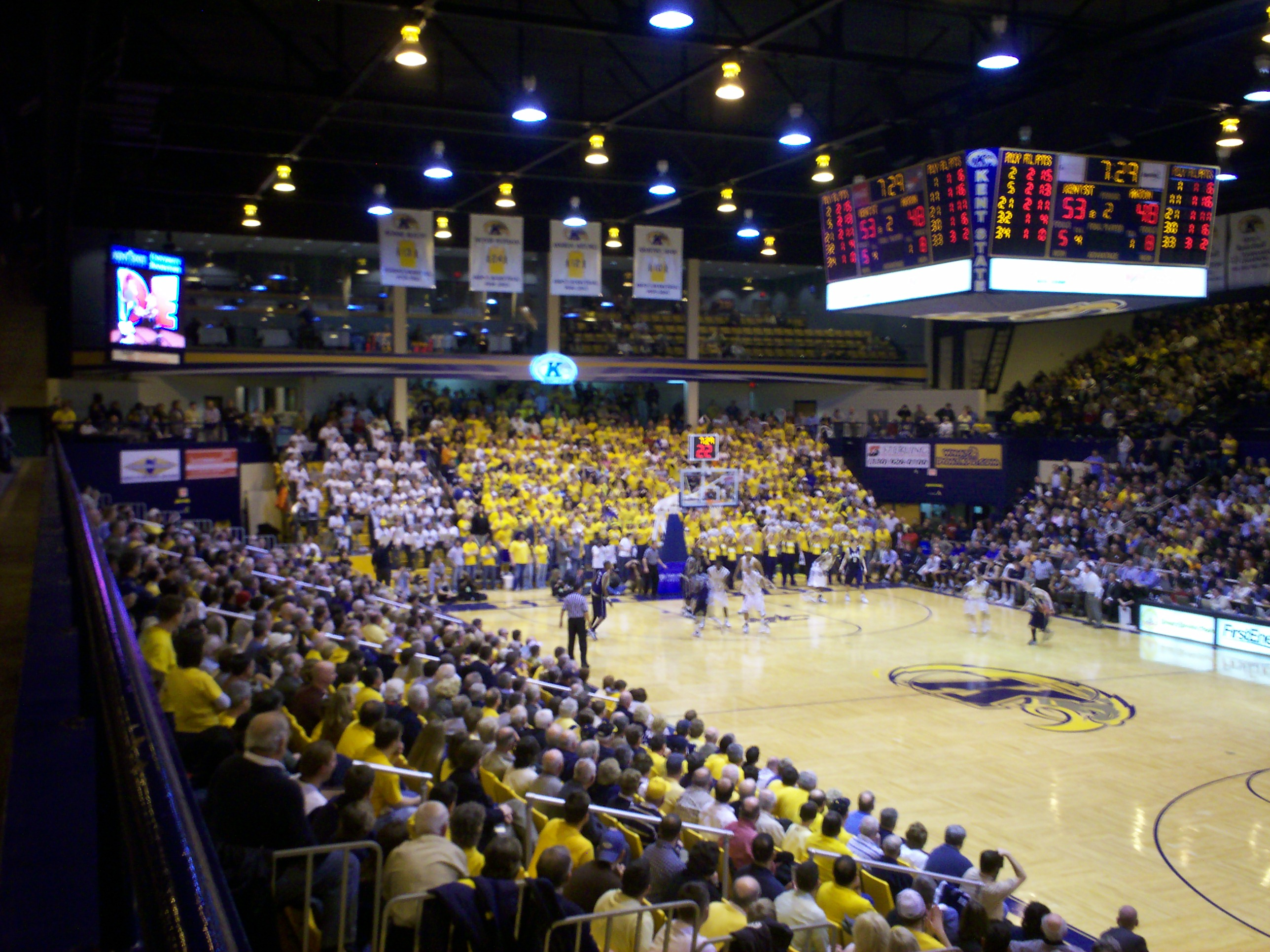
A KSU men's basketball game at the Memorial Athletic and Convocation Center

Kent is also the home of Kent State's athletic teams, the Golden Flashes, who compete in the National Collegiate Athletic Association (NCAA) at the Division I level as a member of the Mid-American Conference East Division. Several of Kent State's teams have enjoyed league and national success, the most notable being the men's basketball team's run to the Elite Eight in the 2002 NCAA Tournament and the baseball team's appearance in the 2012 College World Series. The 6,327-seat Memorial Athletic and Convocation Center, commonly referred to as the MAC Center, is the site of a number of athletic events in multiple sports, including wrestling, women's gymnastics, women's volleyball, and men's and women's basketball. It is also a regular site for the Mid-American Conference's wrestling and women's gymnastics championships.

In addition to hosting the KSU football team, Kent State's 25,319-seat Dix Stadium has been a venue for high school football games. The adjacent Murphy-Mellis Field is a location for Ohio High School Athletic Association (OHSAA) field hockey tournament games and the Diamond at Dix is a regular venue for OHSAA regional softball tournament games. From 1975 to 1981 the Cleveland Browns held their training camp in Kent at Kent State University.

The Kent State University Ice Arena serves as host to several local ice hockey programs including youth leagues, high school and professional teams, and as a site for OHSAA high school tournament games and ice skating competitions in addition to being home of KSU's club team, which competes in the American Collegiate Hockey Association. The ice arena is also the home of the Kent Twisters, a member of the Pennsylvania-Ohio Women's Hockey Association, an adult amateur women's ice hockey league. Kent also plays host to the Portage County Open tennis tournament, held annually at the tennis courts of Theodore Roosevelt High School.

== Parks and recreation ==
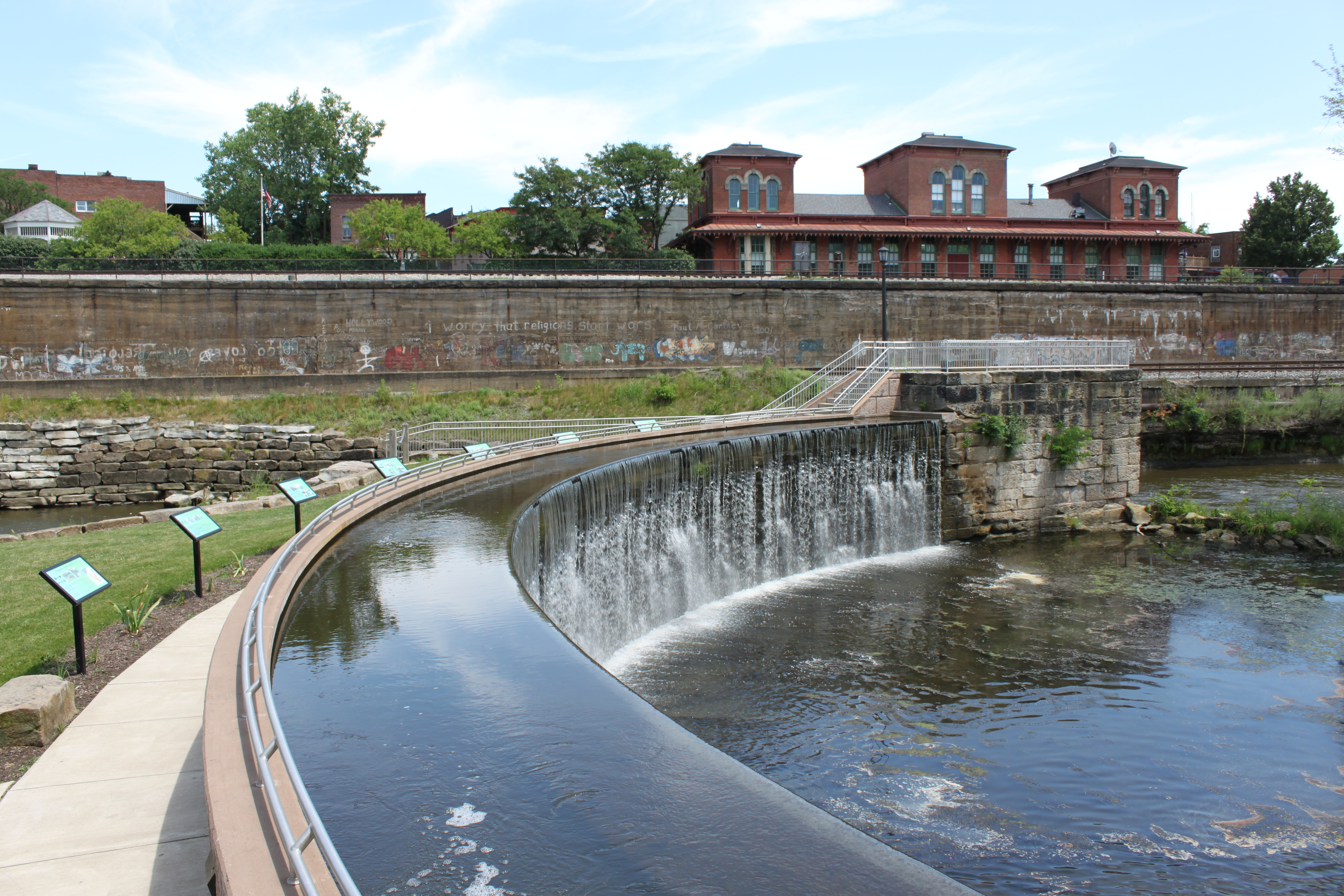
View from Heritage Park facing downtown

The city operates nearly 20 parks and preserves, the largest of which is the 56-acre (23 ha) Fred Fuller park along the Cuyahoga River, named after a former Kent Parks chairman. The park includes the Kramer Fields baseball and softball complex, which contains four fields, two of which are lighted. Several of the parks along the Cuyahoga River are on or near areas of historical significance. Franklin Mills Riveredge Park, which follows the Cuyahoga River through downtown Kent, passes through a large portion of the Kent Industrial District along with Heritage Park and includes sites related to the Pennsylvania and Ohio Canal. Adjacent on the south is the John Brown Tannery Park, on the site of the former tannery John Brown helped fund with Zenas Kent in the 1830s, while Brady's Leap park, adjacent to the north, is at the location of the famed leap over the Cuyahoga River by Captain Samuel Brady circa 1780. The parks and recreation department, in addition to operating and maintaining the city's parks and preserves, also operates a recreation center on the city's south side and offers several sports, arts, and education programs at various locations in Kent. The department also sponsors events throughout the year including Art in the Park, an ice-skating party, hayrides, and Santa's Arrival. The Kent City School District operates an indoor pool at Theodore Roosevelt High School that is available for public recreational and instructional use outside of its use by the school for athletics and physical education. The pool hosts swimming lessons and serves as a home venue for the Hudson-based Hudson Explorers Aquatic Team, a competitive swimming program.

Within the city are segments of the Portage Hike and Bike Trail, which is jointly managed with Kent State University, the Portage Park District, and the city of Ravenna. The main portion of the trail follows the Cuyahoga River in Kent with most of the trail paved with asphalt. In August 2012, as part of several redevelopment projects in the downtown area, Kent State University began construction of the Esplanade Extension, which was completed in August 2013 and connects the university's portion of trail extending to Dix Stadium, known as the University Esplanade, to downtown Kent. The trail connects with the hike and bike trails in neighboring Summit County and links Kent with nearby communities in Portage County. The Cooperrider-Kent Bog State Nature Preserve, located in the southern edge of Kent, is one of the most intact bogs in Ohio, with the southernmost and largest stand of tamarack trees in the continental United States.

Through partnerships with Kent State University Recreational Services and other local agencies, additional recreational opportunities are available to city residents. A livery known as Crooked River Adventures is available at Tannery Park. The livery generally operates from May to October depending on weather and water levels. Canoe, kayak, tubing, and bicycle rentals are available to residents and students with kayak and canoe service as far as Brust Park in Munroe Falls and Water Works Park in Cuyahoga Falls. Kent also has a bicycle-sharing system known as Flashfleet in partnership with the university and PARTA. The program offers yearly memberships or hourly rentals with locations on campus and in the downtown area.

== Government ==
Map showing the six wards of Kent since 2022

Kent is governed by a charter form of government with a council–manager system of nine council members and a mayor. The city is divided into six wards and voters select a mayor, a council member representing their ward, and three at-large council members in staggered four-year terms. The city charter, adopted in 1963, is reviewed by a charter commission every 10 years who then make recommendations for changes, the last review being in 2025. The city council hires a city manager who oversees the day-to-day operations in the various city departments and enforces policies set by council. The mayor serves a largely ceremonial role as president of the council and votes only in the event of a tie. Kent voters approved the change from a mayor-council system to council-manager in 1975 and it went into effect in 1977. Dave Ruller began serving as city manager June 15, 2005, while Jack Amrhein was sworn in as acting mayor on October 15, 2025, to finish out the term of previous mayor Jerry Fiala, who died in September 2025. Amrhein was already running for mayor unopposed at the time, so his appointment as mayor became official on January 1, 2026.

As part of the city government, Kent also has departments of community development, health, human services, law, parks and recreation, public safety, and public service. The Public Service Department oversees a variety of construction and maintenance works as well as the city's water treatment and water reclamation systems while the Public Safety Department includes both the police and fire departments. The Kent Police Department, based out of their main station in the downtown area, includes 911 dispatch for Kent and Franklin Township. Kent State University also operates its own police department, based at Stockdale Hall, which mainly patrols the KSU campus and KSU property in and out of the Kent city limits. The fire department operates two stations, the main station adjacent to the Safety Administration Building and the West Side Fire Station along North Mantua Street on the western side of the Cuyahoga River. Kent Fire also provides fire and emergency medical service coverage for Franklin Township and the village of Sugar Bush Knolls.

The city's main sources of tax revenue come from income tax, set at 2.25%, and property tax. Voters approved an increase in the income tax rate from 2.0% in November 2013 to fund a new police station and the new rate took effect January 1, 2014. The rate increase includes a sunset provision that requires the tax rate to return to 2.0% once debt is paid off on the new facility. In 2014, the city operated on a budget of approximately $40 million. The largest percentage of the budget, 31% or $11.9 million, was spent on public safety services followed by 22% or $8.5 million on basic utilities. Debt service accounted for $6.0 million or 17% of the budget while transportation projects accounted for 9% or $3.37 million of the budget, 8% or $3.33 million towards general government expenses, and $2.35 million allocated for construction of a new police station.

At the state level, Kent is in the 72nd district of the Ohio House of Representatives, represented since 2025 by Republican Heidi Workman, of Rootstown. In the State Senate, Kent is part of the 27th district, represented since 2025 by Republican Kristina Roegner of Hudson. At the Federal level, Kent is included in Ohio's 13th congressional district, represented since 2023 by Republican Dave Joyce of Geauga County.

=== Flag ===
Official flag of Kent, adopted June 21, 2023

Previous flag of Kent, adopted in 1975

The flag for the city of Kent is a white burgee-shaped flag with two green stripes and two blue stripes intersecting at an eight-pointed star. It was adopted by Kent City Council on June 21, 2023, and was the result of a year-long process that included the work of a volunteer city flag committee and community input.

The burgee or swallowtail shape of the flag references the shape of the Flag of Ohio as well as the previous flag of Kent adopted in 1975. The color green symbolizes "agricultural influence, prosperity, fertility, youthfulness and hope" while the green stripes symbolize Kent's nickname as the Tree City. The color blue symbolizes "determination, liberation, alertness and good fortune" and the blue stripes symbolize the Cuyahoga River and the Pennsylvania and Ohio Canal, key elements in the city's founding and early growth. The saltire formed by the blue stripes can also be seen to symbolize the railroad, another major element in Kent's development. The four stripes also recall the four basic periods of Kent's history: the prehistory, early settlement and canal era, railroad era, and modern college town and the four stripes meet to "celebrate Kent's intersection of cultures". The octagram at the center is in the style of a quilt star meant to symbolize the North Star and Kent's role in the Underground Railroad and to stand for the city's "history of inclusion, diversity and forward thinking."

The flag was designed by Kent resident Zach Garster and was recommended to city council after several rounds of committee and public input. The initial call for designs from June through August 2022 produced 68 designs from 33 individual contributors. These were narrowed to three finalists in January 2023, which were displayed at the Kent Free Library from March through June 14 to allow the public to see the designs in person and leave feedback on them.

Adoption of a new flag was first proposed in 2018 by Mayor Jerry Fiala to replace the previous flag adopted in 1975 that was largely unknown and unused. A design created by an earlier city flag committee was submitted in March 2022, but it was rejected by council. Instead, city council proposed forming a new committee and began taking applications in May, choosing the five members in June. The previous flag of Kent was also burgee shaped, but was yellow with "City of Kent Ohio" in large black letters. On the left side was a blue triangle to represent the Cuyahoga River, with a "lamp of knowledge" to symbolise the Kent City Schools and Kent State University and a tree to symbolize Kent's nickname as the Tree City. It was designed by Kent resident Keith Bauer, then a nine year old in fourth grade at Holden Elementary School, as part of a flag contest sponsored by the Jaycee Janes, then the women's auxiliary of the United States Junior Chamber.

== Education ==
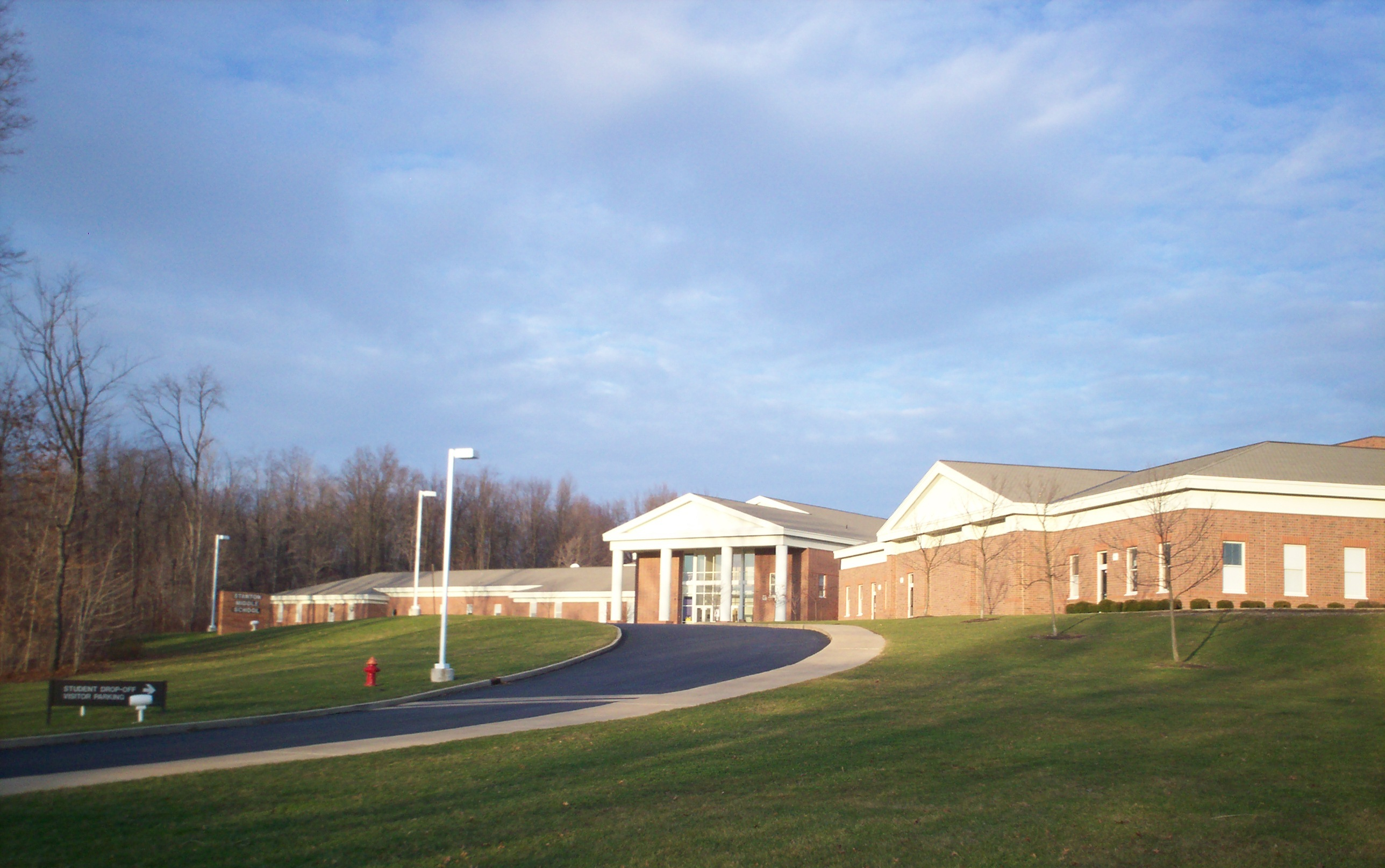
Stanton Middle School

Preschool, elementary, and secondary education is mainly provided by the Kent City School District. The portion of the city south of State Route 261 is part of the neighboring Field Local School District. The Kent district was created around 1860 and later merged with the Franklin Township and Brady Lake school districts in 1959. It serves most of Kent and Franklin Township, the village Sugar Bush Knolls and a small part of southern Streetsboro. Kent has four neighborhood elementary schools that serve students in grades K–5, Stanton Middle School for grades 6–8, and Theodore Roosevelt High School for grades 9–12. The district also operates a preschool program housed at Davey Elementary School, and is a member of the Six District Educational Compact with five surrounding districts to facilitate vocational education, with many of these programs housed at Roosevelt High School.

Kent also has one private school, St. Patrick School, which serves around 200 students in grades K–8 from Kent and several surrounding communities as of the 2021–22 school year. It is part of Kent's St. Patrick parish and is affiliated with the Roman Catholic Diocese of Youngstown.

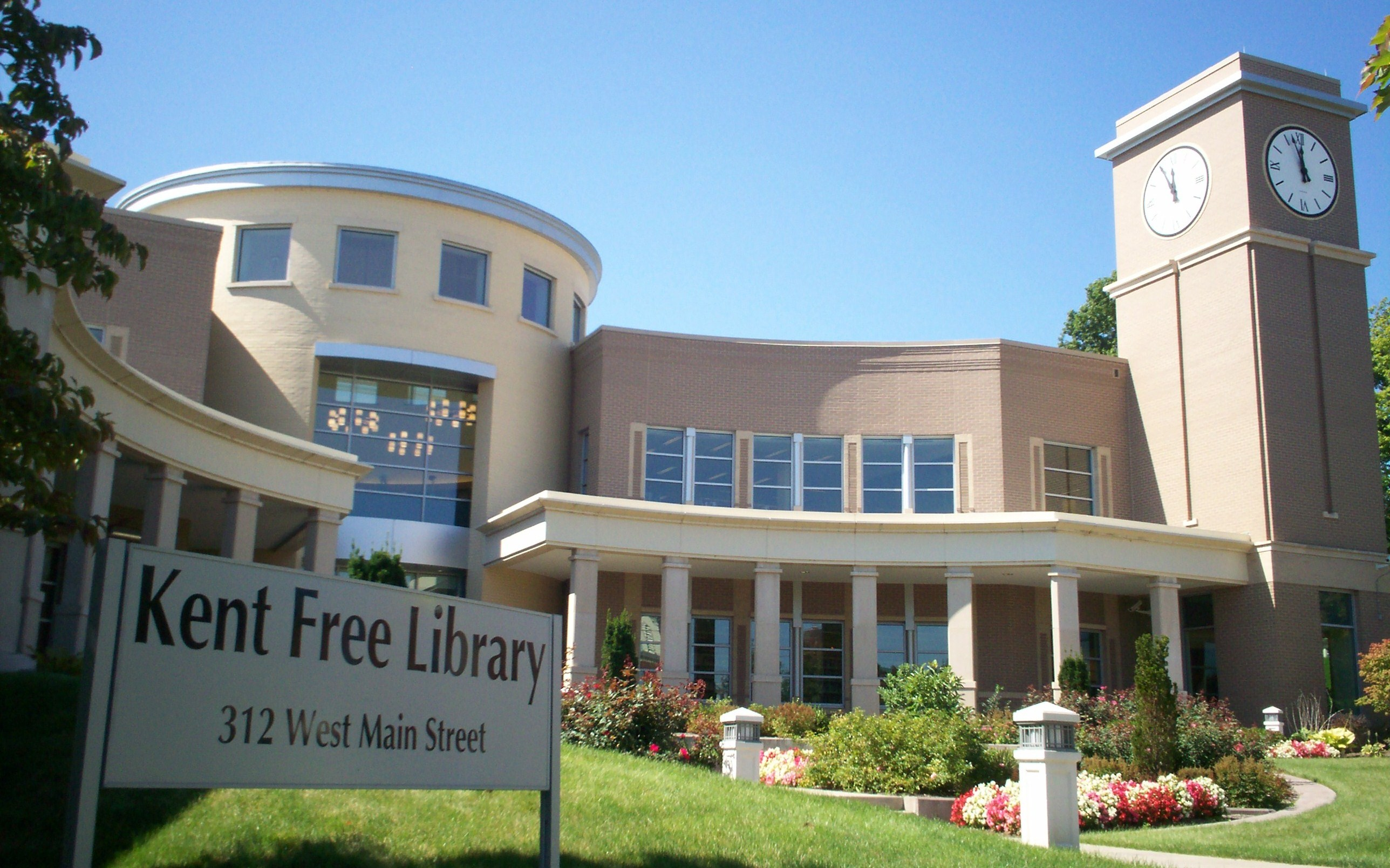
Newer portion of the Kent Free Library

The Kent Free Library is the main public library. It was established in 1892 after Kent became the first village in Ohio to use an 1892 state law which allowed municipalities under a population of 5,000 to tax residents for the upkeep of a library. Andrew Carnegie donated $10,000 in 1901 for construction of a permanent home for the library, which opened in 1903. The 2006 expansion to the library brought available space to 55,000 square feet (5,100 m^{2}) with a book collection of 166,407 items as of 2023. It is a school district library associated with the Kent City School District and is also part of the Portage Library Consortium, connecting it with Reed Memorial Library in Ravenna and the Portage County District Library, which maintains six branch libraries across the county and a bookmobile.

The main campus of Kent State University is located in the southeastern part of the city. The campus itself occupies 866 acres (350 ha) and the university owns thousands of additional acres adjacent to the campus. Additional facilities include a research park and golf course just east of the city limits in Franklin Township and the Kent State University Airport, just west of Kent in Stow. Founded in 1910 as a teacher training institution, the university has become a world leader in the development of liquid crystals through the Liquid Crystal Institute and was the site of the first patent for the modern liquid crystal in the 1970s. In 2009 the university inaugurated the College of Public Health, the second public health program in Ohio. The Kent State library system, which includes the 12-story main library and houses over 2.6 million volumes, includes six additional department libraries on the main campus and a branch at each of the seven regional campuses. The library system is a member of the Association of Research Libraries, one of three in Ohio and 124 in North America. The university offers over 300 programs of study combined in the undergraduate and graduate levels and serves over 41,000 students in eight campuses across Northeast Ohio with over 26,000 at the main campus in Kent.

== Media ==
Kent is part of the Cleveland–Akron (Canton) Television Market Area as defined by the Federal Communications Commission, which includes a 17-county region of Northeast Ohio. As of 2024 it ranks as the 19th-largest media market in the United States according to Nielsen Media Research. While most stations are located in Cleveland and Akron, Kent is home to the offices and main studio of PBS Western Reserve, the Public Broadcasting Service (PBS) member station for Akron and Youngstown. Kent State University hosts two student-run television broadcasts in KentStaterTV, formerly known as TV-2, and Black Squirrel TV. Both broadcasts are available on campus and online. Kent is also in range of the television stations that broadcast out of Youngstown.

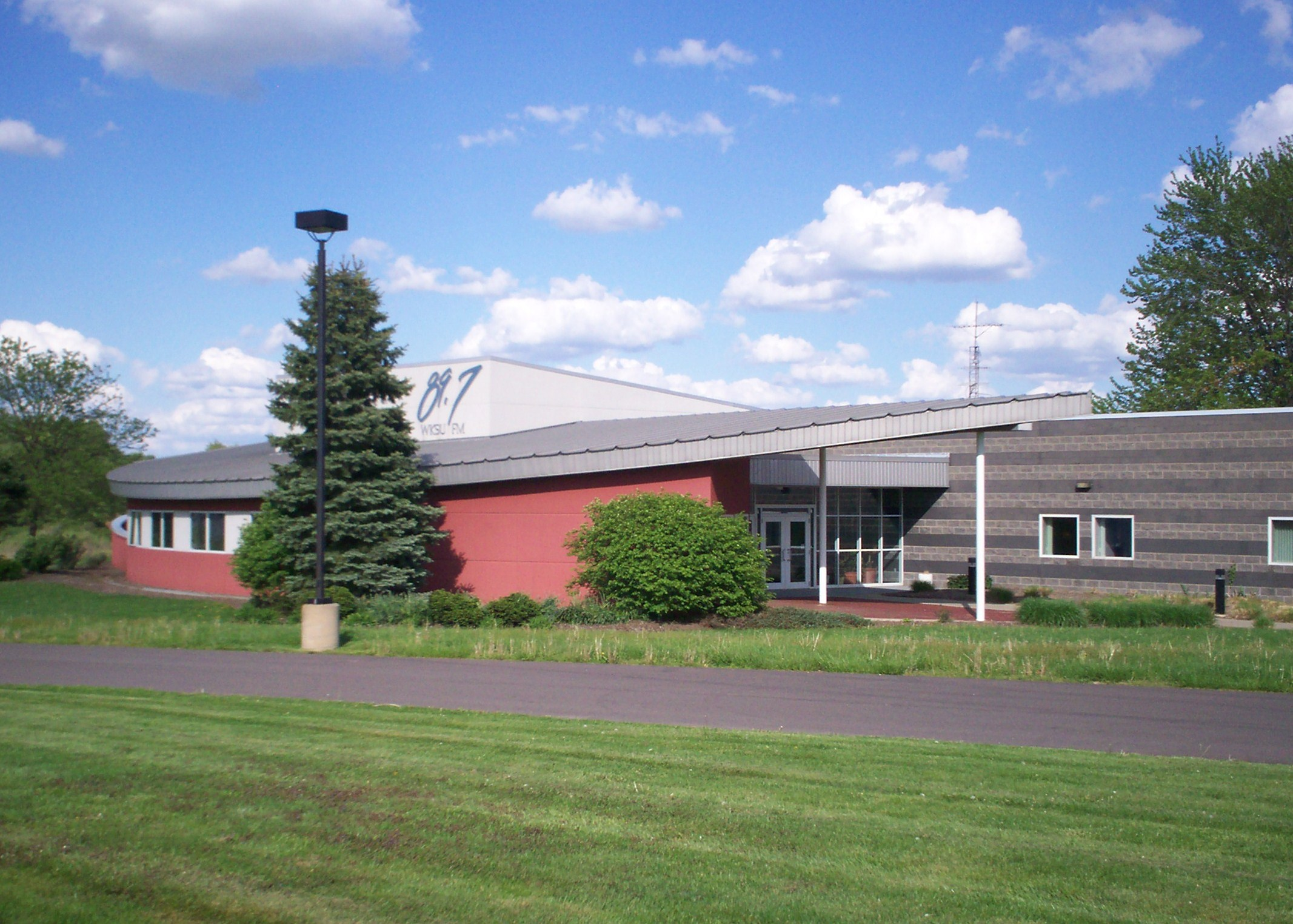
Former studios for WKSU on the Kent State University campus.

For radio, Kent is part of the Akron radio market, though it is within range of major stations in the Cleveland radio market as well as many in the Youngstown-Warren and Canton markets. Two radio stations, both on the FM dial, are licensed to Kent. WKSU (89.7 FM), owned by Kent State University and operated by Ideastream Public Media, is an NPR-member station for the Akron, Canton and Cleveland radio markets via a region-wide repeater network with studios in Downtown Cleveland; prior to 2021, WKSU broadcast from studios on the Kent State University campus. WNIR (100.1 FM) carries a locally based talk radio format for the Akron radio market operating from studios shared with then sister television station W16DO-D in Franklin Township. One AM station was also previously licensed to Kent but has since ceased operations: WNIR's former AM adjunct, WJMP. Black Squirrel Radio, a student-run internet radio station at Kent State University, is available online.

The Record-Courier, a daily newspaper which mainly covers Portage County, is the main source of printed news media for Kent. The Record-Courier was formed by the merger of the Ravenna Evening Record and the Kent Courier-Tribune and is published by the Record Publishing Company, a subsidiary of GateHouse Media. The Record-Courier maintained an office in Kent until 2008. In addition to the Record-Courier, the Kent offices house the various departments of Record Publishing and its other weekly newspapers that serve several Summit and Portage County communities. Kent Patch, a local division of Patch Media, mainly serves as an online bulletin board for local events. It was established in 2010 and functioned as a news source specific to Kent before Patch Media downsized hundreds of local Patch sites across the United States in October 2013. The city is also served by Kent State University's Kent Stater, which is available in print at select locations on and off campus and online. The Akron Beacon Journal and The Plain Dealer also serve Kent through regional coverage and delivery. Magazines published at Kent State include Fusion, an LGBTQ magazine; Kent State Magazine, an official publication of the university; and The Burr, a student-run magazine about events going on in and around Kent.

== Infrastructure ==
The city operates its own water system, drawing groundwater from wells with an adjacent water treatment plant located just outside the city limits in Franklin Township as well as using a water reclamation facility along the Cuyahoga River in the southwestern part of the city. Waste collection for the entire city is handled through a local private contractor and Portage County handles the city's recycling collection. Kent's original recycling program was developed in 1970 by the Kent Environmental Council and was Ohio's first comprehensive and self-supporting program. Local phone utilities are provided through AT&T Ohio through the 330 and 234 area codes, electricity is supplied and lines are maintained by FirstEnergy in the former coverage area of Ohio Edison, and natural gas is supplied and lines are maintained by Dominion Resources East Ohio Energy. While residents are free to choose their own natural gas and electric suppliers, the city is part of the Northeast Ohio Public Energy Council, or NOPEC, the largest government aggregation in the United States.

=== Transportation ===
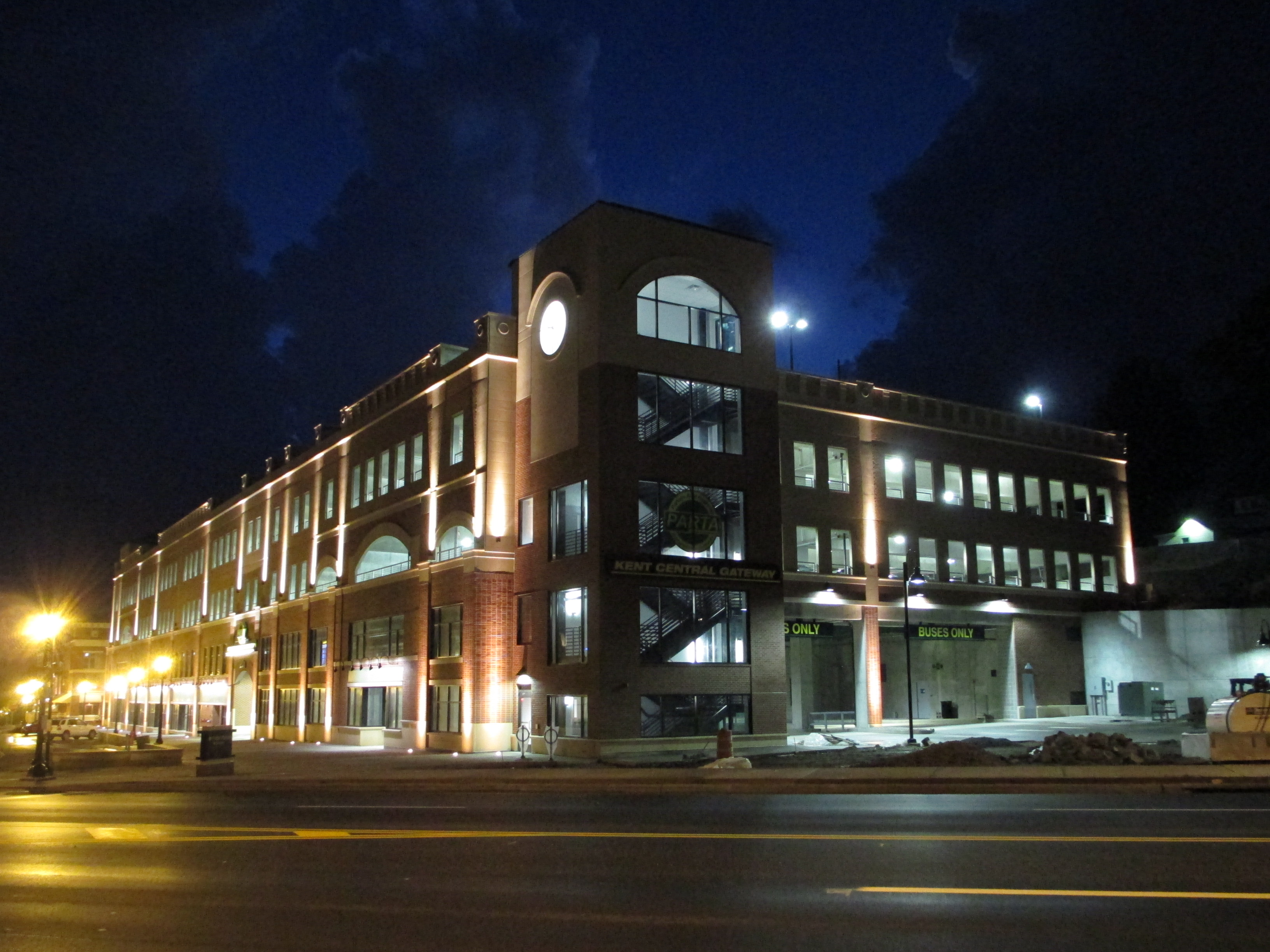
Kent Central Gateway, downtown

State Route 59 is the main east–west highway, following East and West Main Streets and Haymaker Parkway. Summit Street is another major east–west road mainly on Kent's eastern side, passing through and linking much of the Kent State campus. Fairchild Avenue is an important east–west road on the city's west side connecting with Stow and Cuyahoga Falls. State Route 43 is the main north–south highway, mainly following North Mantua and South Water Streets. SR 43 connects Kent with Interstate 76, approximately 3 miles (5 km) to the south via exit 33 in Brimfield and to the Ohio Turnpike/Interstate 80 and the eastern terminus of Interstate 480, approximately 7 miles (11 km) to the north via Turnpike exit 187 in Streetsboro. Both SR 43 and SR 59 are four to five-lane roads within the city limits. State Route 261 passes through the southern and eastern edges of the city and is a four-lane divided highway for a short distance with the remainder a two-lane highway. It serves as a bypass between SR 43, SR 59, and Summit Street on Kent's south and eastern sides and to Tallmadge on the southwest.

Public transportation is provided by the Portage Area Regional Transportation Authority, known as PARTA, which is headquartered just outside the city limits in Franklin Township. PARTA serves Kent through a dial-a-ride service, the Suburban and Kent Circulator routes completely within the city limits, the seasonal Black Squirrel route along SR 59 during Kent State University's Fall and Spring semesters, and the Interurban connecting with Stow and Ravenna. There are also two express routes, one to Akron connecting with METRO Regional Transit Authority via Brimfield, and a Cleveland Express route connecting with the Greater Cleveland Regional Transit Authority via Streetsboro, Twinsburg, and Maple Heights. PARTA also includes Campus Bus Service, which provides three fixed routes on the campus of Kent State University. An intermodal transit facility, known as the Kent Central Gateway, opened in 2013 in the downtown area to provide better integration of the existing bus system, hike-and-bike trails, and parking. The building was financed mainly from a $20 million Transportation Investment Generating Economic Recovery (TIGER) grant received in February 2010 and construction began in April 2011.

Kent has three rail lines run by the Norfolk Southern and CSX: the former Erie Lackawanna line between Jersey City and Chicago, The Nickel Plate Road line between Cleveland and Zanesville, and the old Baltimore & Ohio line between Baltimore and Willard.

=== Healthcare ===
Hospital care is provided mainly through University Hospitals Portage Medical Center, affiliated with University Hospitals of Cleveland, which operates the UH Kent Health Center in the southern part of the city. The UH Kent Health Center includes an emergency services building with 24-hour emergency room and an urgent care center, adjacent to a medical arts building housing a medical imaging center and family medicine doctors. The 150-bed main hospital is located in Ravenna and the system operates additional facilities throughout Portage County. Free clinics include the AxessPointe Community Health Center and a clinic operated by social agency Townhall II.

== Religion ==
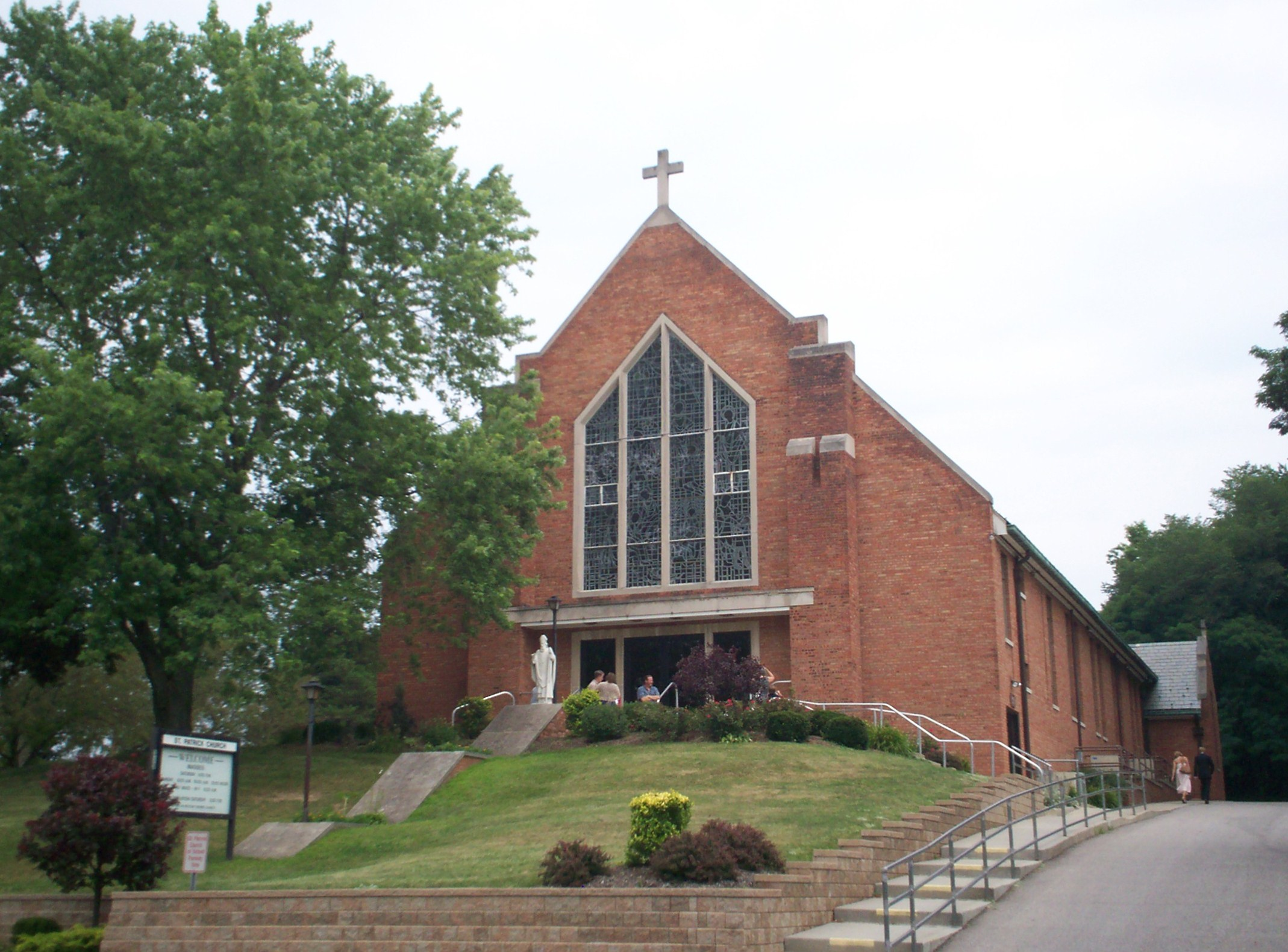
St. Patrick Church, a Roman Catholic worship site that is part of the larger parish of St. Katharine Drexel, is the city's largest religious body.

The earliest organized religious services in Kent were held in 1815 when a Methodist group was formed, followed by a Congregational church in 1819. The first religious meetinghouse in Kent, which also served as the first schoolhouse, was built in 1817 and was used by several different denominations. Later, the Methodists built another building in 1828 that was also used by multiple denominations. The oldest church building in Kent still used as a place of worship is the Unitarian Universalist Church on Gougler Avenue, which was dedicated in 1868. The former home of the Congregational Church was dedicated in 1858 and still stands along Gougler Avenue very near the Unitarian Universalist Church. It served as the home of the First Congregational Church—which became the Kent United Church of Christ in 1964—until 1955. It was later purchased by a local business and was used as their corporate headquarters for 65 years before being repurposed as a brewery in 2021.

As of 2026, the city is part of a Roman Catholic parish in the Diocese of Youngstown that operates two worship sites in Kent, one a family church and one a Newman Center, as well as congregations of the United Methodist Church, African Methodist Episcopal Church, Free Methodist Church, United Church of Christ, Lutheran Church–Missouri Synod, Evangelical Lutheran Church in America, Church of the Brethren, the Christian Church (Disciples of Christ), Presbyterian Church, Church of Christ, Episcopal Church, and Jehovah's Witnesses. There are also Unitarian Universalist, non-denominational Christian, and Baháʼí Faith congregations. Although there are no Jewish synagogues or temples, there is a Hillel International Jewish student center on the campus of Kent State University which serves students at Kent State, the University of Akron, and Hiram College. Just outside the city limits in Franklin Township are the Kent congregations of the Association of Related Churches, Baptist, and Free Will Baptist churches. The Islamic Society of Akron and Kent operates a masjid and school on its main campus in Cuyahoga Falls, west of Kent. It was founded in Kent in 1979 and maintains an additional masjid in the city. Kent is also part of a ward of The Church of Jesus Christ of Latter-day Saints that meets in Rootstown. The ward was first organized in Kent in 1954 and includes southern Portage County and parts of Trumbull, Mahoning, and Stark Counties.

== Notable people ==
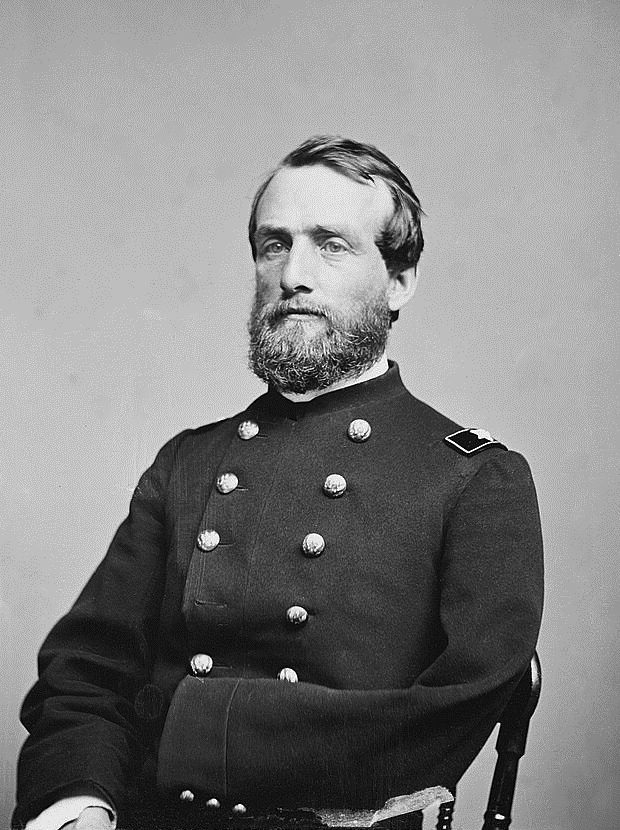
Lucius Fairchild

Kent's natives and residents are referred to as "Kentites". John Davey, a pioneer in tree surgery and founder of the Davey Tree Expert Company, moved to Kent in the 1880s. His son, Martin L. Davey, later served as Governor of Ohio and a U.S. Representative. Other political figures to come from Kent include Wisconsin governor Lucius Fairchild, former U.S. Representative Robert E. Cook, and noted abolitionist John Brown, who lived in what was then Franklin Mills from 1835 to 1839. Noted athletes to have come from Kent include former National Football League players Mike Adamle, Tom DeLeone, and Stan White and former Major League Baseball player, manager, and executive Gene Michael. Two members of the band Devo, which debuted in Kent in 1973 and was founded by Kent State University students, are natives of Kent: Gerald Casale and Rod Reisman. Other performing artists to come from Kent include singer Julianne Baird, playwright Vincent J. Cardinal, and voice actor Joshua Seth. Lucien Price, an author and writer for The Boston Evening Transcript and The Atlantic Monthly grew up in Kent and used the pseudonym "Woolwick" for Kent in some of his stories. Kent was also the home of inventor Lucien B. Smith, regarded as the inventor of barbed wire. Kent State researcher James Fergason invented the Liquid crystal display technology that enabled low-power electronic devices. Additionally, people who have lived in Kent while attending Kent State University include comedians Drew Carey and Arsenio Hall, actor Michael Keaton, musicians Joe Walsh and Chrissie Hynde, and additional members of the band Devo. Athletes include football players Antonio Gates, James Harrison, Julian Edelman, Joshua Cribbs, and Jack Lambert; Major League Baseball players Thurman Munson, Rich Rollins, and Andy Sonnanstine; college football coaches Nick Saban and Lou Holtz; and golfer Ben Curtis, who resides in Franklin Township just north of the Kent city limits and lists Kent as his residence.

== Twin town ==
Kent has one twin town, Dudince in southern Slovakia. The relationship was established in 2003 through Sister Cities International and resulted in the formation of the Kent-Dudince Sister City Association to promote learning and understanding of the Slovak culture. The group meets regularly and organizes cultural exchanges and programs that feature Slovak dance and music. Cultural exchanges have included a performance of a choir from Kent's Theodore Roosevelt High School in Dudince in 2004 and tour groups from Kent visiting in 2006 and 2008.
