= H.L. Stevens & Company =

Former American architectural firm

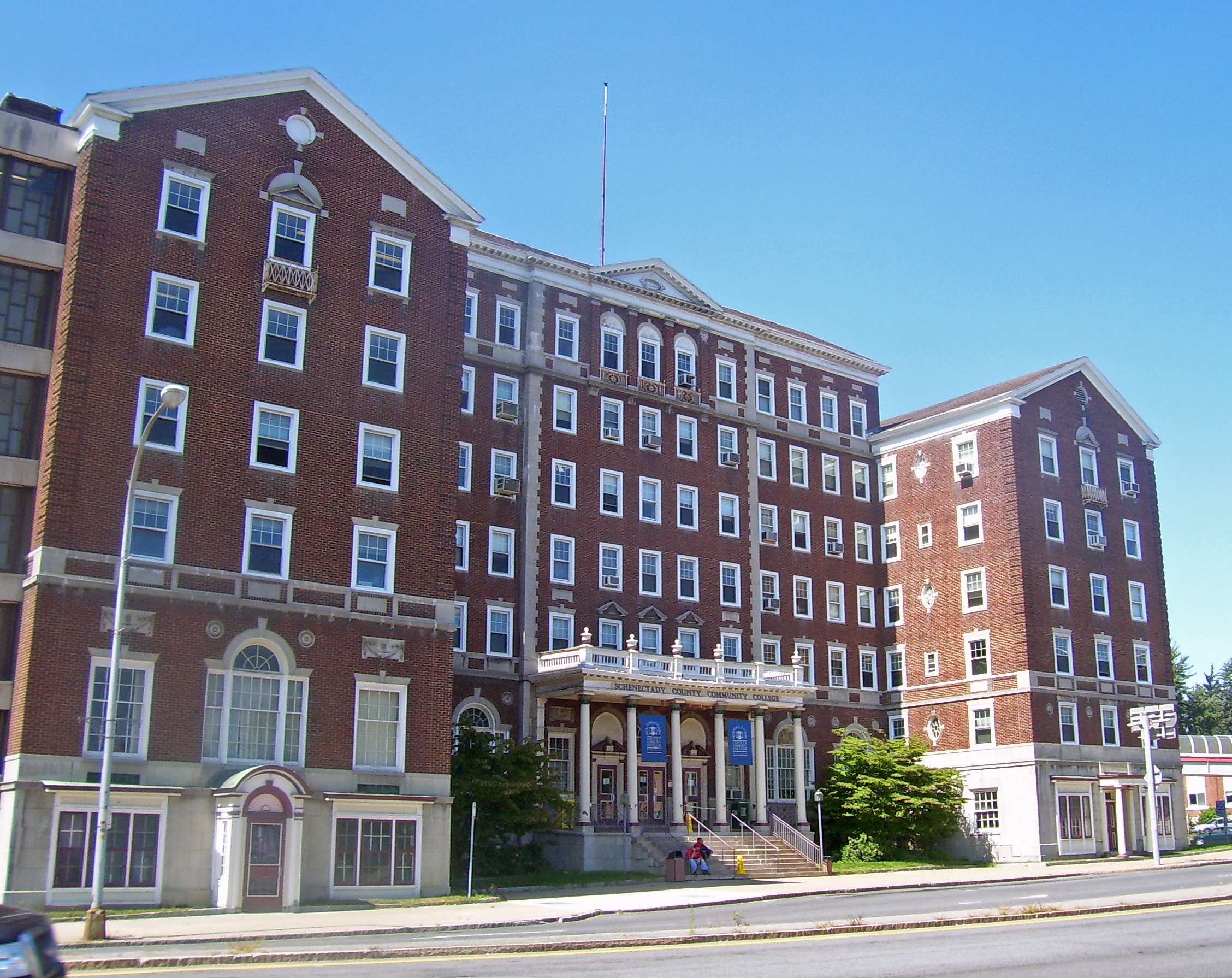
Hotel Van Curler, Schenectady, New York

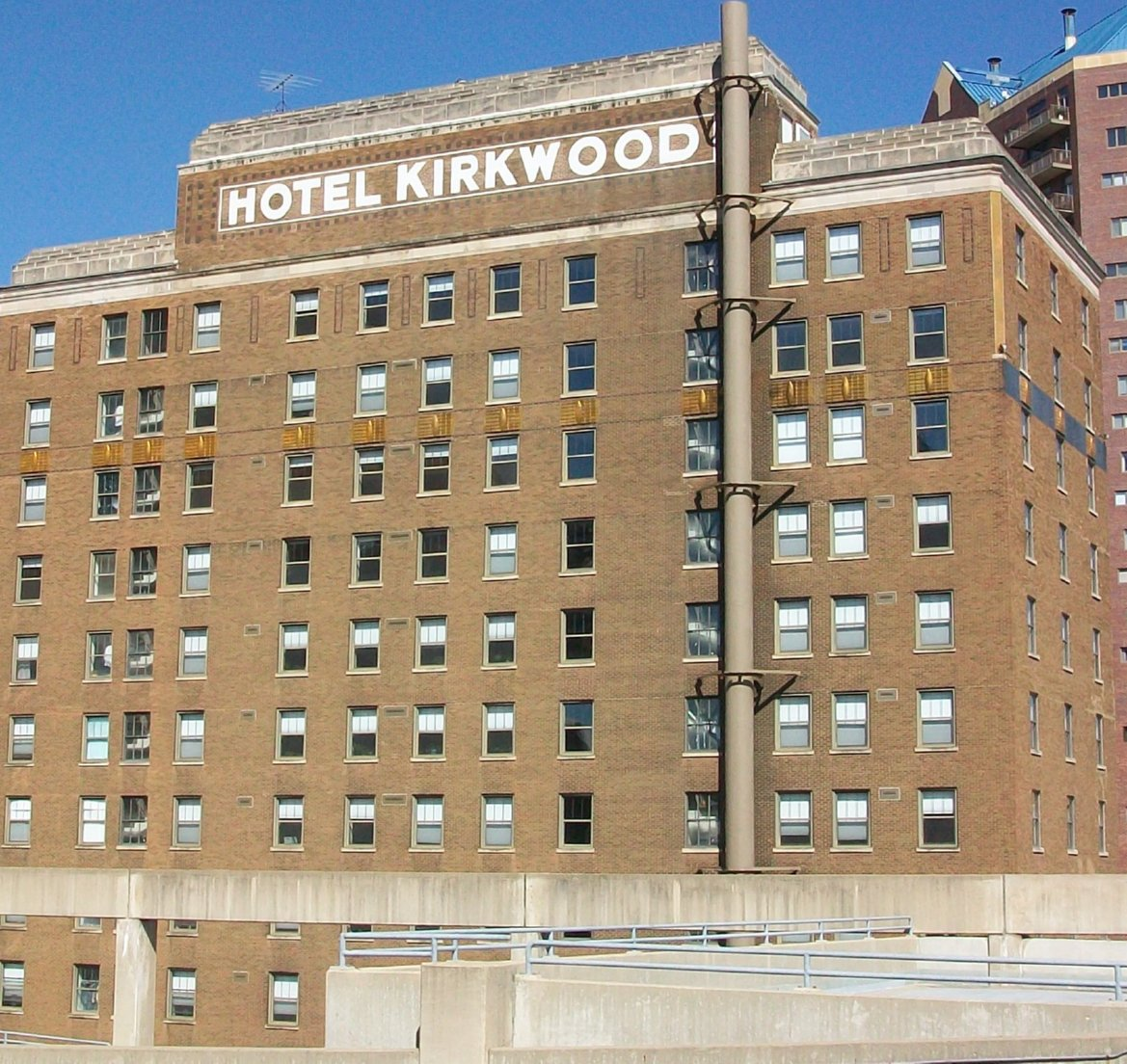
Hotel Kirkwood, Des Moines, Iowa

H.L. Stevens & Company was an American architectural firm that designed hotels around the United States. It was based in Chicago-, New York-, and San Francisco. At least 15 of its works are listed on the National Register of Historic Places for their architecture.

The firm specialized in small (less than 500 rooms) hotels and apartment houses in a Georgian Revival or Colonial Revival style in either a rectangular or H-shape, which in at least one case was viewed as a refreshing change from the small, squarish hotels that a city had previously experienced. Their buildings, primarily in the Northeast, are in many cases still extant.

In 1912, there was some dispute surrounding the State of Illinois's approval of the firm as an architectural firm, because, as a corporation, it appeared incorrect to allow the designation of the corporation as a licensed architect.

The firm developed hospitals during World War I. During that time, it created an integrated approach to design and construction that would be termed "fast-tracking" today; it applied this approach to its development of hotels starting with the Penn Alto Hotel.

Works include (with attribution that varies in punctuation):

- Burritt Hotel, 67 W. Main St., New Britain, Connecticut, (Stevens, H.L., Company), NRHP-listed
- Franklin Hotel, 176 East Main St., Kent, Ohio, (Stevens, H.L. & Co.), NRHP-listed
- Hotel 24 South, 24 S. Market St., Staunton, Virginia
- Hotel Ashtabula, 4726 Main Ave., Ashtabula, Ohio, (Stevens, H.L., & Co.), NRHP-listed
- Hotel Bothwell, 103 E. Fourth St., Sedalia, Missouri, (Stevens, H.L., & Co.), NRHP-listed
- Hotel Capital, 139 N. 11th St., Lincoln, Nebraska, (Stevens, H.L., & Co.), NRHP-listed
- Hotel Kirkwood, 400 4th St. (400 Walnut St.), Des Moines, Iowa, (Stevens, H.L., and Company), NRHP-listed
- Hotel Norfolk (Norfolk, Nebraska), 108 N. Fourth St., Norfolk, Nebraska, (Stevens, H.L., Co.), NRHP-listed
- Hotel Randolph, 200-204 4th St., Des Moines, Iowa, (Stevens, H.L., Co.), NRHP-listed
- Hotel Van Curler, built 1925, 78 Washington Ave., Schenectady, New York, (Stevens, H.L. and Company), NRHP-listed
- Hotel Vicksburg, built 1929, 801 Clay Street, Vicksburg, Mississippi; NRHP-listed
- Iowana Hotel, 203 W. Montgomery St., Creston, Iowa, (Stevens, H.L. & Co.), NRHP-listed
- Leopold Hotel, 1224 Cornwall Ave., Bellingham, Washington, (Stevens, H.L., Co.), NRHP-listed
- Lord Nelson Hotel, 1515 South Park St, Halifax, Nova Scotia
- Onesto Hotel, 2nd and Cleveland, NW, Canton, Ohio, (Stevenson, H.L.), NRHP-listed
- Parke Apartments, 33 Gates Circle, Buffalo, New York, (Stevens, H.L. & Co.), NRHP-listed
- Penn Alto Hotel, 12th St. and 13th Ave., Altoona, Pennsylvania, (Stevens, H.L., Co.), NRHP-listed
- Savery Hotel, 401 Locust St., Des Moines, Iowa, (Stevens, H.L. & Co.), NRHP-listed
- One or more works in Downtown Birmingham Historic District, boundary increase II: roughly along 23rd St. and 3rd Ave., bounded by 5th Ave., 22nd St., and 2nd Ave., Birmingham, Alabama, (Stevens, H.L.), NRHP-listed
- One or more buildings in the Iowa City Downtown Historic District, NRHP-listed
