= Schenectady Armory =

- U.S. National Register of Historic Places
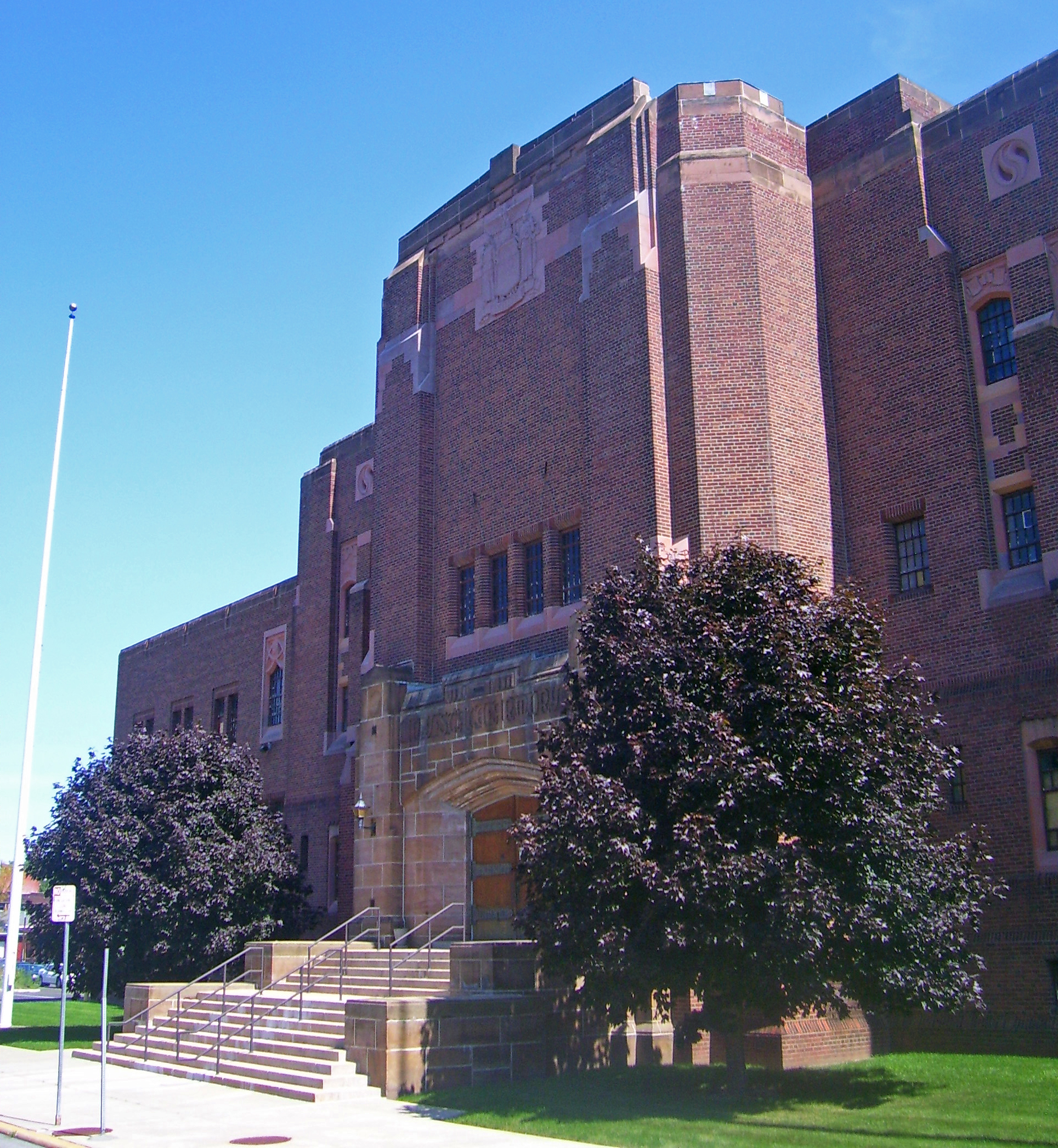
- West elevation with entrance pavilion, 2008
- Location: Schenectady, NY
- Coordinates: 42°48′48.13″N 73°56′57.36″W
- Area: 1.9 acres (0.77 ha)
- Built: 1936
- Architect: William Haugaard
- Architectural style: Art Deco (exterior), Tudorbethan (interior)
- MPS: Army National Guard Armories in New York State MPS
- NRHP reference No.: 95000087
- Added to NRHP: March 2, 1995

The Schenectady Armory is located on Washington Avenue in the city of the same name in the U.S. state of New York. It is a brown brick building dating to 1936.

New York's state architect at that time, William Haugaard, used the Art Deco architectural style for the exterior of the building and the Tudorbethan mode for the interior. The armory remains virtually intact today. It was home to two units of the New York Army National Guard until it was closed in 2008. In 1995 it was listed on the National Register of Historic Places.

It is currently operating as the Armory Studios NY soundstage and entertainment complex.

== Building ==
The armory is on a one-way extension of Washington Avenue just north of its interchange with Interstate 890 and just south of Schenectady County Community College's Elston Hall opposite, the former Hotel Van Curler. To its east is Fuller Street and some industrial buildings.

=== Exterior ===
It is on a 1.9-acre (0.77 ha) lot with one other building, a modern garage not considered a contributing resource to the Register listing. The armory itself is a T-shaped building of brick on a steel frame structural system. The main block is three and a half stories in height with slightly asymmetrical two-story side wings. It has a projecting entrance pavilion on the west (front) elevation, with a segmented arch over its sally port, filled with two heavy oak doors with medieval-inspired hardware. The facade is otherwise embellished with details representing both the Art Deco and Tudorbethan styles.

Projecting perpendicularly to the main administration building on the east is the drill shed, a gable-roofed wing with its windows spaced by buttresses with stone caps. The brick-faced concrete block garage is to the southeast.

=== Interior ===
The main entrance vestibule is a two-story octagonal space with concrete wainscoting painted to look like red sandstone. Doors leading to offices off the entrance have half-sidelights and scored concrete surrounds. Corridors on the first story are cross-vaulted, with those on the second story using barrel vaults. Both have concrete ceilings and brick walls.

At the end of the north wing's first story, the company meeting room, later converted into a bar and dining room, features paneled wainscoting, stuccoed concrete walls and a concrete ceiling encasing the support beams. The offices elsewhere in the wing have generally been subdivided and modernized, although the second-story corridor's barrel vault, accentuated by spandrels supported by brick piers, is intact.

In the drill shed, the ceiling is wainscoted, with steel trusses, exposed brick walls and an intact balcony at the west end. The original hardwood flooring has been covered with wooden tiles.

== History ==
Schenectady's first armory was built in 1868 to serve two local units, the Washington Continentals and the Citizens' Corps. The former, formed in 1839, had first served in the Mexican War. It was broken up during the recent Civil War but reformed afterwards. The Citizens' Corps was not formally organized until 1873. It joined the New York National Guard in 1880, becoming the 36th Separate Company.

Their armory was built with a $30,000 ($660,000 in contemporary dollars) appropriation from the state obtained by newly elected assemblyman Robert Furman. A three-member commission including Furman chose the hill in Crescent Park overlooking the city as the site for a three-story red brick building with a polychrome slate roof. Records show an "83rd Regiment" drilling in the armory until it disbanded in 1874. It may have become the 36th and 37th Separate Companies.

In 1890, sentiment began to grow to build a new armory. State architect Isaac Perry's new building was completed and built on the same site in 1898, just in time for the Spanish–American War. It was well-received locally and continued to serve the local Guard units as they prepared and mustered for World War I, where they were designated as the 105th Infantry of the American Expeditionary Force, a name that remained associated with Schenectady for many years. After the war, as many as five separate companies were using the armory, and throughout the 1920s they began lobbying for another new armory.

The state finally began construction of the current building in 1936. Unlike other armories built in New York during the Great Depression, Schenectady's was located in the core of the city, near the hotel, the General Electric plant a quarter-mile (400 m) away, and businesses that had flocked to Erie Boulevard, the recently filled former route of the Erie Canal. The old armory in Crescent Park was demolished in 1946.

The armory continued to serve local military needs through World War II, the Korean War and the early years of the Cold War. In the early 1960s it was isolated in the neighborhood when I-890 was built. The hotel went bankrupt but was quickly reused as Schenectady County Community College's Elston Hall.

By the 21st century the armory had again grown outdated, and the state's Division of Military and Naval Affairs closed it down on November 10, 2008, to save heating costs. College sporting events and other gatherings that had been held in the armory were likewise suspended. The 206th Military Police Company, which had been based there, moved to a new facility in Latham, and the other tenant, the 501st Explosive Ordnance Disposal Battalion, moved to the new Scotia Armed Forces Reserve Center at the Schenectady County Airport. The state sold the armory at auction in July 2012 for $260,000. It was purchased by partners Ray and Jeff Legere.

It now operates as Armory Studios NY, a soundstage, catering and entertainment complex. During the 2025 season, it was home to the New York Phoenix of The Basketball League (TBL).

== See also ==
- National Register of Historic Places listings in Schenectady County, New York
