= Lord Nelson Hotel (Halifax, Nova Scotia) =

Hotel in Nova Scotia, Canada

Lord Nelson Hotel & Suites
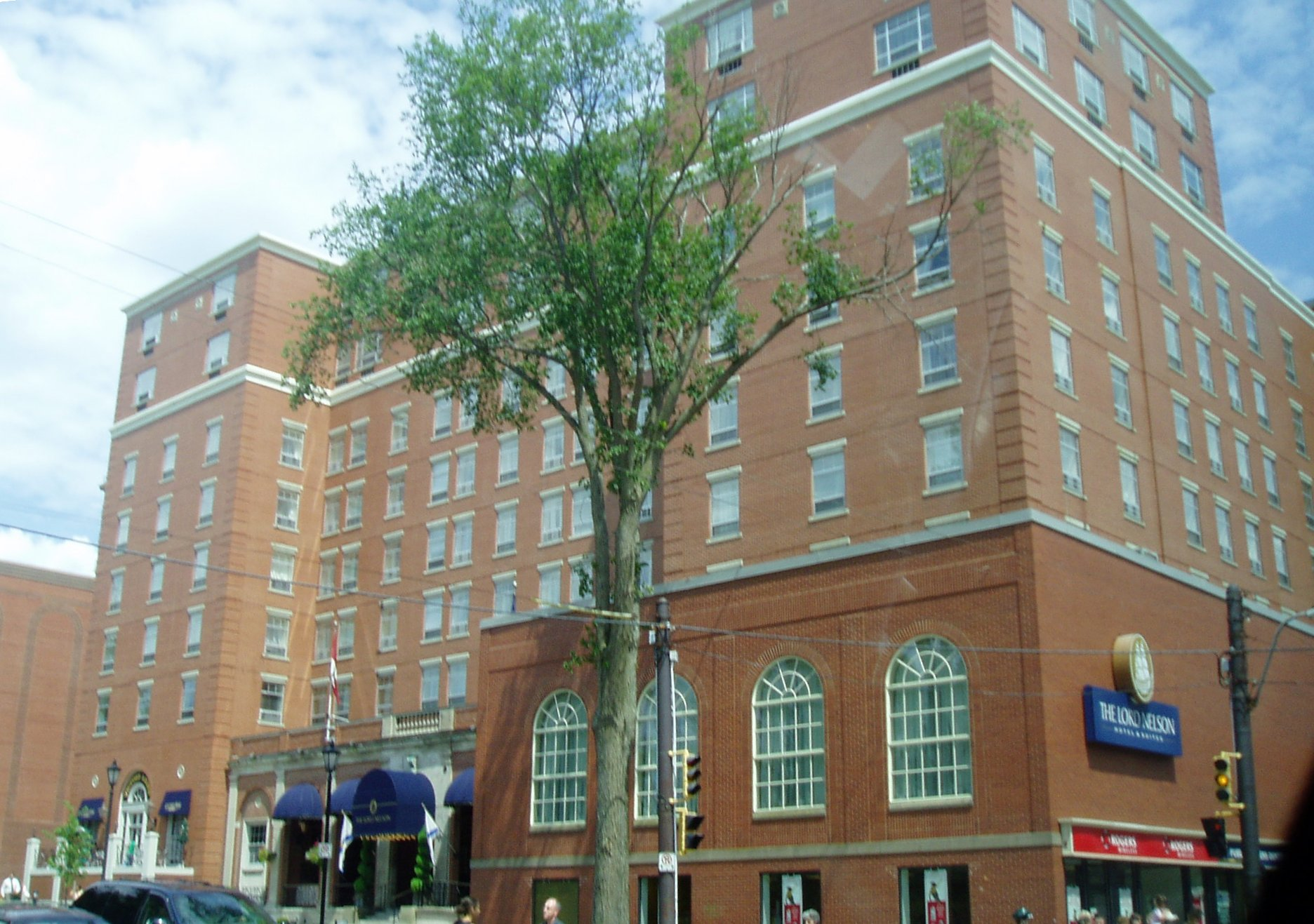
- Exterior of the Lord Nelson Hotel

General information
- Location: 1515 South Park St, Halifax, Nova Scotia; B3J 2L2
- Coordinates: 44°38′33.72″N 63°34′46.56″W
- Construction started: 21 October 1927
- Opening: 23 October 1928
- Owner: Universal Realty Group

Height
- Height: 32.68 m (107.2 ft)

Technical details
- Floor count: 9

Design and construction
- Architect: O. C. Gross
- Developer: H.L. Stevens & Company

Website
- lordnelsonhotel.ca

The Lord Nelson Hotel & Suites, commonly referred to as the Lord Nelson Hotel, is a grand hotel in Halifax, Nova Scotia, Canada. It is located on the corner of Spring Garden Road and South Park Street across from the Halifax Public Gardens. It was built in 1927 by a consortium of investors led by the Canadian Pacific Railway, which wanted a Halifax anchor to the chain of hotels that was operated by its Nova Scotian subsidiary, the Dominion Atlantic Railway. Along with the rival Canadian National Railway's Hotel Nova Scotian which began the same year, the Lord Nelson was Halifax's first modern hotel. The hotel was named after Admiral Horatio Nelson, who ironically never came to Halifax in his famous naval career (there are notably also an apartment building in Burlington, Ontario and a public school in London, Ontario, named after Lord Nelson, neither of which he attended), but his name stood for naval traditions strongly associated with the heritage of Halifax.

== History ==
On Friday, October 21, 1927, construction on the Lord Nelson Hotel began at the corner of Spring Garden Road and South Park Street, on the old Dwyer property. The turning of the first sod was done by Mayor Kenny of Halifax, who was supported by a group of friends and well-wishers. The Lord Nelson Hotel opened for business on October 23, 1928. The hotel has changed hands over the years and is now privately owned.

The task of supervising the construction was assumed by O.C. Gross, architect, with construction carried out by H.L. Stevens & Co. of New York and Toronto, for Canadian Pacific Railways, which had already constructed a chain of hotels in the Annapolis Valley for its subsidiary, the Dominion Atlantic Railway. The Stevens company had building experience in frosty winter weather and at night heated the building area that had just been completed with small stoves, which kept the frost from getting into the finished walls. The building has a reinforced concrete foundation, topped with a course of granite to support the brick walls.

The hotels closest in style to the Lord Nelson Hotel at the time of construction was the Van Curler Hotel in Schenectady, New York, which was built for the General Electric Company, and the Newfoundland Hotel, in St. John's, Newfoundland built for the Newfoundland Railway. The walls of the Lord Nelson are of bluenose brick with ornate frame and Nova Scotia trip, with the concrete framework being covered in by brick. The aim of the construction was to use local materials and to award contracts locally. As much as possible, materials available in Nova Scotia were used although some had to be imported.

The main entrance to the hotel is on South Park Street and originally featured a semi-circular driveway with trees and shrubs. The Georgian style has been incorporated in the construction of the hotel, featuring special decorations pertaining to Lord Nelson. In the lobby a large mural of Nelson addressing his men on the deck of his flagship HMS Victory, just before the Battle of Trafalgar, is present. The painting was done by Sister Agnes Berchmans, a native of New Brunswick. There are two of her paintings in the hotel, the large mural and the smaller one in the Georgian Lounge. The gold leaf lobby ceiling is copied from the ceiling in the House of Commons in Ottawa and was hand finished by an Italian craftsman. There are floral and other motifs on the inverted sections, with the Cap Railways logo among them. The lobby is 80 feet by 40 feet, and the Georgian Lounge is 60 feet by 28 feet. The original ballroom, the Regency, is 88 feet by 38 feet and retains its original hardwood floor and crystal chandeliers.

The original section of the hotel had seven stories with 200 rooms. There have since been two additions, and the hotel now features 260 rooms. The 8th and the 9th floors were added in 1966, and the North Tower section was added in 1975. The hotel helped make Spring Garden Road into a major shopping district. Spring Garden Road shops at the time of construction simply consisted of a beauty shop, a barber shop, and a large grill. A drugstore now occupies the space that was once the grill.

== Cultural impact ==
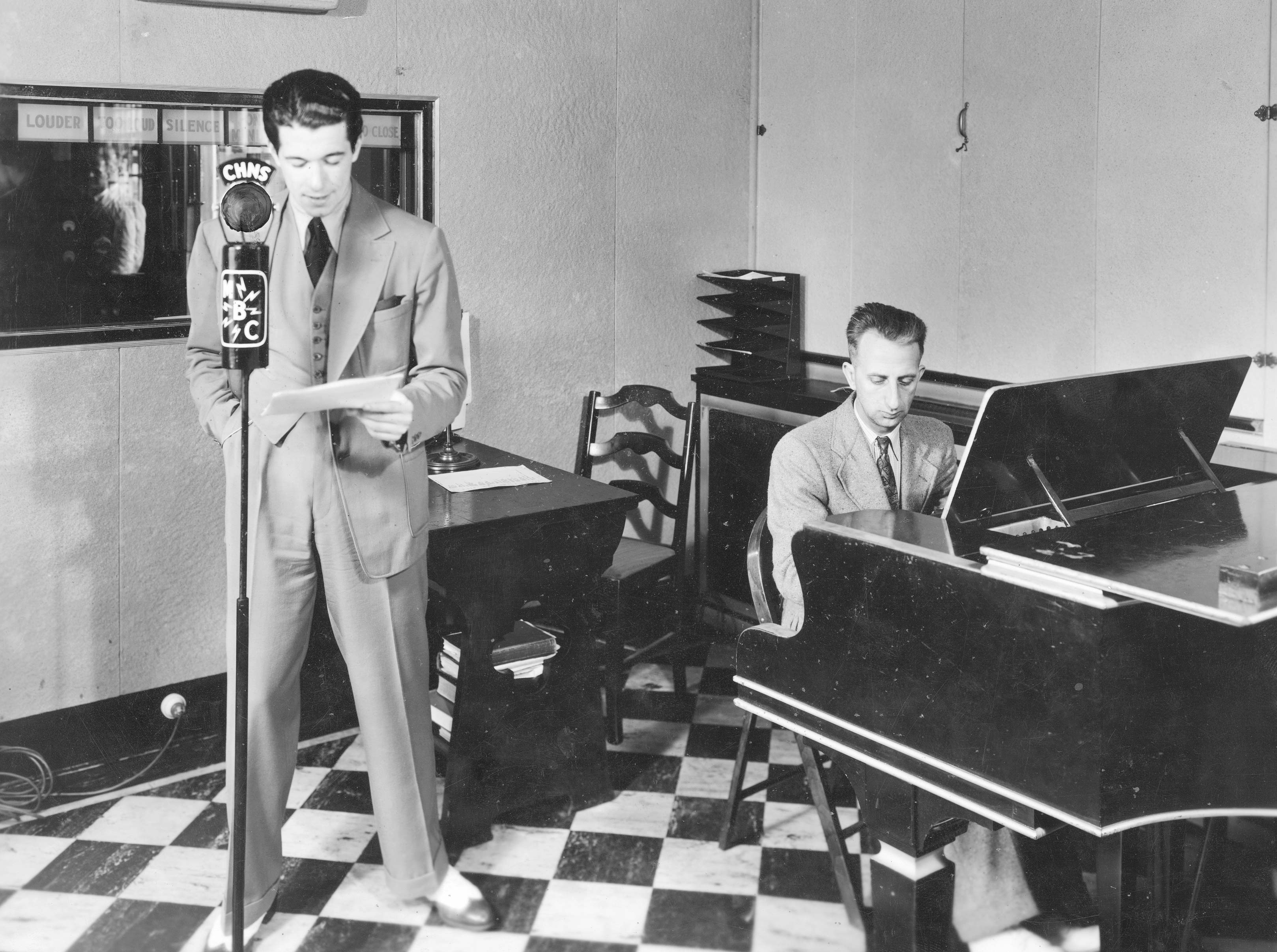
Actor Austin Willis and pianist Dick Fry perform from the CHNS Studio in the Lord Nelson Hotel, 1928

The Lord Nelson Hotel was named after the English naval hero, Horatio Nelson. A young student, Oswald Schenk, won a contest for suggesting the name of the hotel, which opened during the early days of radio. Its height made CHNS, which began in 1926, move its broadcast studio from the old Carleton Hotel to the roof of the new Lord Nelson in 1928. It inspired a critically-acclaimed novel by Ray Smith, Lord Nelson Tavern, first published in 1974. The Lord Nelson also inspired the fictional hotel featured in the award-winning 1998 novel The Museum Guard by Howard Norman. Famous guests who have stayed at the Lord Nelson Hotel include the Rolling Stones, Anne Murray, Keith Urban, the White Stripes, Jerry Seinfeld, Ozzy Osbourne, Paul McCartney, and Willem Dafoe.
