= Schenectady College =

Schenectady College may refer to:

- Schenectady County Community College
- Union College, sometimes called Schenectady College in older writing
