= Randolph Hotel =

Randolph Hotel may refer to:

in England

- Randolph Hotel, Oxford, England

in the United States

- Randolph Hotel (Des Moines, Iowa), on the National Register of Historic Places in Iowa, also known as Hotel Randolph
- Randolph Hotel (Chicago), temporary name of the former Bismarck Hotel in Chicago, now Hotel Allegro
