= Penn Alto Building =

- Penn Alto Hotel
- U.S. National Register of Historic Places
- U.S. Historic district – Contributing property
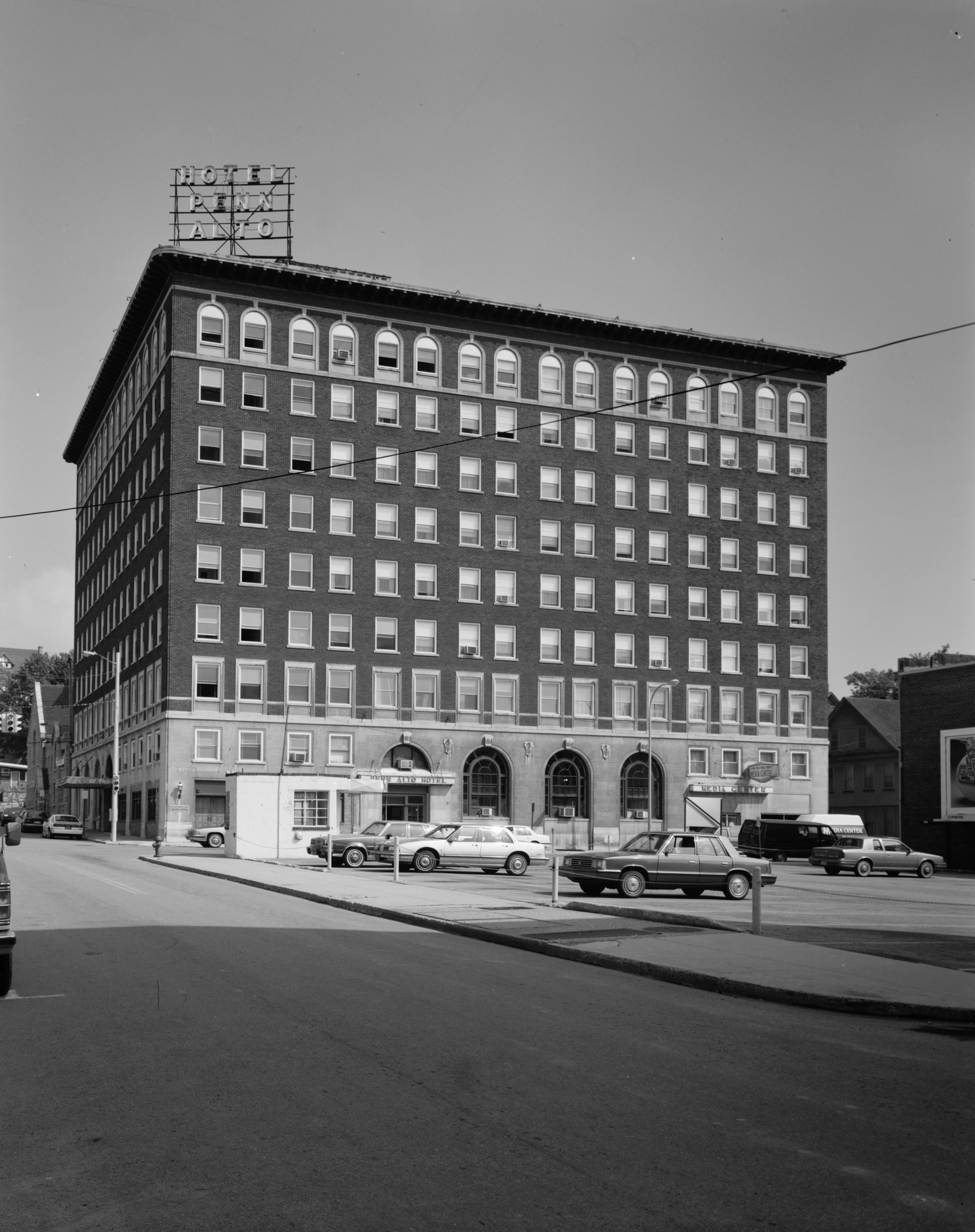
- Front of the hotel, 1989

- Location within Pennsylvania Location within the United States
- Location: 12th St. and 13th Ave., Altoona, Pennsylvania
- Coordinates: 40°31′1″N 78°24′9″W
- Area: 0.4 acres (0.16 ha)
- Built: 1921
- Architect: Stevens, H.L., Co.
- Architectural style: Renaissance
- NRHP reference No.: 89000350
- Added to NRHP: May 5, 1989

The Penn Alto Building is an historic landmark building that is located in downtown Altoona, Pennsylvania, United States. It is nine stories high and has a partial tenth floor penthouse.

== History and architectural features ==
The name changed from the Penn Alto Hotel to Penn Alto Apartments when it changed from strictly being a hotel to a residential hotel, which rents both apartments and hotel rooms. The current name is City Hall Commons, deriving its name from its proximity to City Hall, which is just across the street.

The building, which was designed by the H.L. Stevens & Company and built in 1921, was added to the National Register of Historic Places in 1989. It is located in the Downtown Altoona Historic District.

Official measurements of the building conflict with each other. One measurement is as conservative as 98 feet (30 m), while another lists it as 115 feet (35 m). These variations may be due to the slight incline that the Penn Alto was built on.

== See also ==
- Downtown Altoona, Pennsylvania
- Altoona, Pennsylvania

== Gallery ==
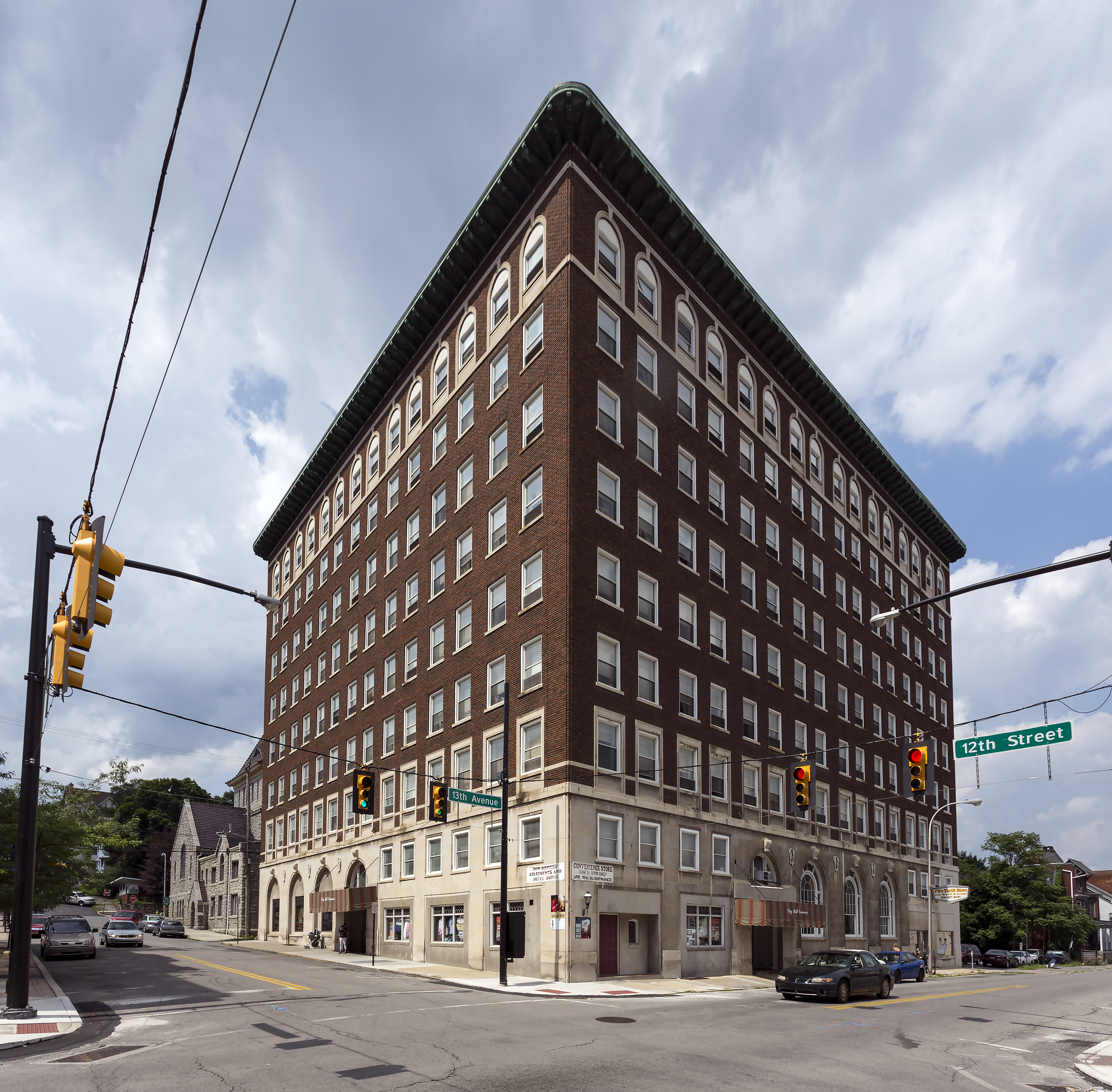
City Hall Commons, 2014
