= Franklin Hotel (Kent, Ohio) =

Historic building in Kent, Ohio, U.S.

- U.S. National Register of Historic Places
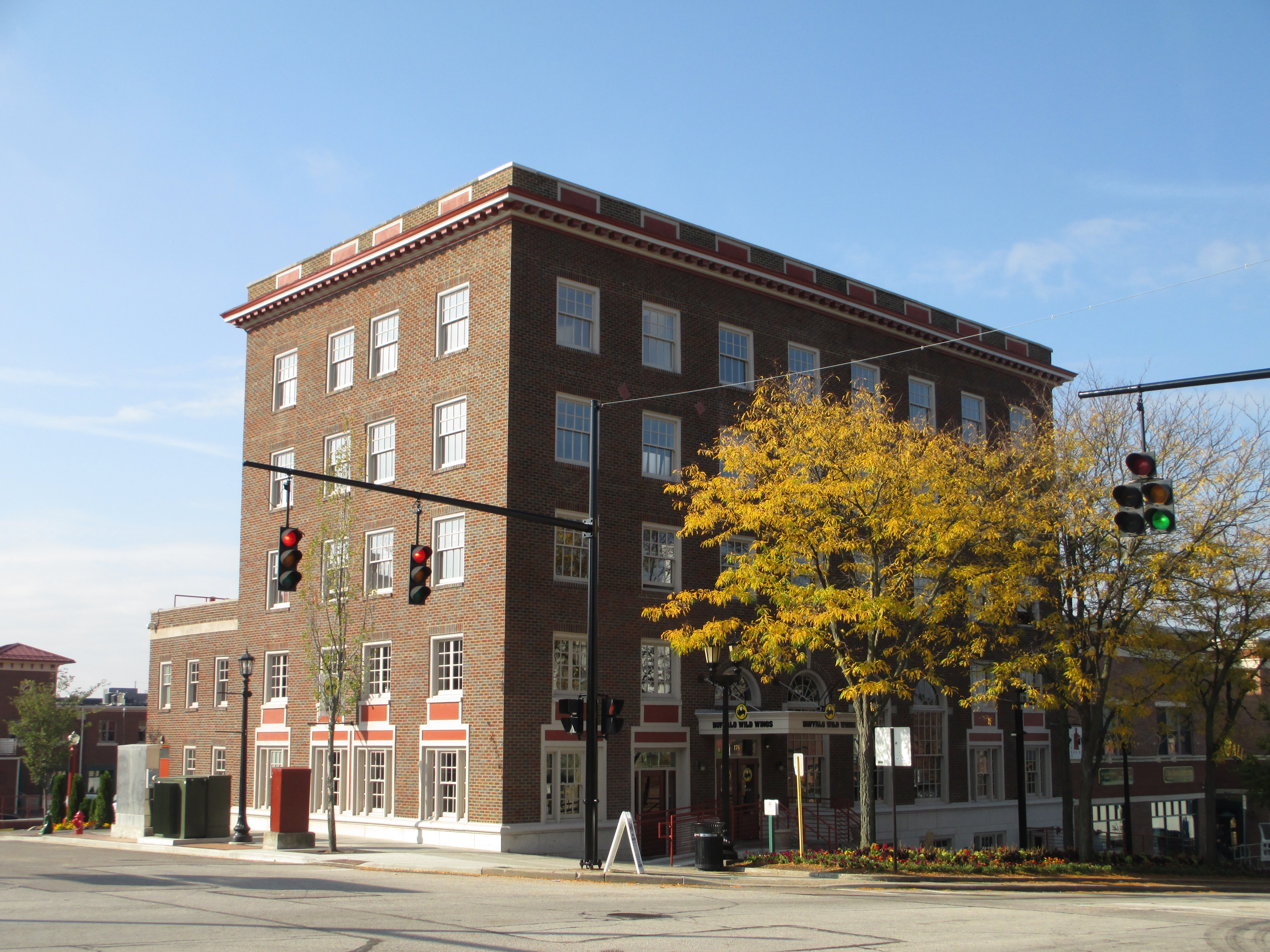
- Front in October 2013

- Location within Ohio Location within the United States
- Location: 176 E. Main St., Kent, Ohio, U.S.
- Coordinates: 41°9′12″N 81°21′34″W
- Built: 1919–20
- Architect: H.L. Stevens
- Architectural style: Neoclassical
- NRHP reference No.: 12000802
- Added to NRHP: January 18, 2013

Acorn Corner, originally known as the Franklin Hotel or Hotel Franklin, is a six-story historic building in Kent, Ohio, United States, listed on the National Register of Historic Places since January 2013. Construction started in 1919 and the hotel opened in September 1920. The hotel was also known as the Hotel Kent and later the Hotel Kent-Ellis. Locally it is often referred to as the "old Kent hotel", "Kent Hotel", or the "old hotel", and historically was nicknamed "the Grand Old Lady of Main Street". The building functioned as a hotel until the early 1970s when it was converted for use as student housing. The upper four floors were condemned in 1979, though the bottom floors housed a number of small businesses until 2000.

After several years of total vacancy and nearly being demolished multiple times in the 2000s, the building was purchased in late 2011 by local developer Ron Burbick and renamed Acorn Corner to complement his adjacent Acorn Alley development. Work also began on a complete $6.5 million renovation and restoration of the building, which included construction of a new elevator shaft. The renovated building, hailed as a "Kent miracle", opened in April 2013 and had a grand opening in May. Its anchor tenant is Buffalo Wild Wings, and also includes a wine bar, offices, and apartments.

The structure, designed by architect H.L. Stevens, is an example of the Neoclassical Revival style. It includes five above-ground levels and a partially exposed basement. It was nominated under National Register Criteria A and B, due to its connections with significant events and developments in local history and important people in the history of Kent.

== History ==
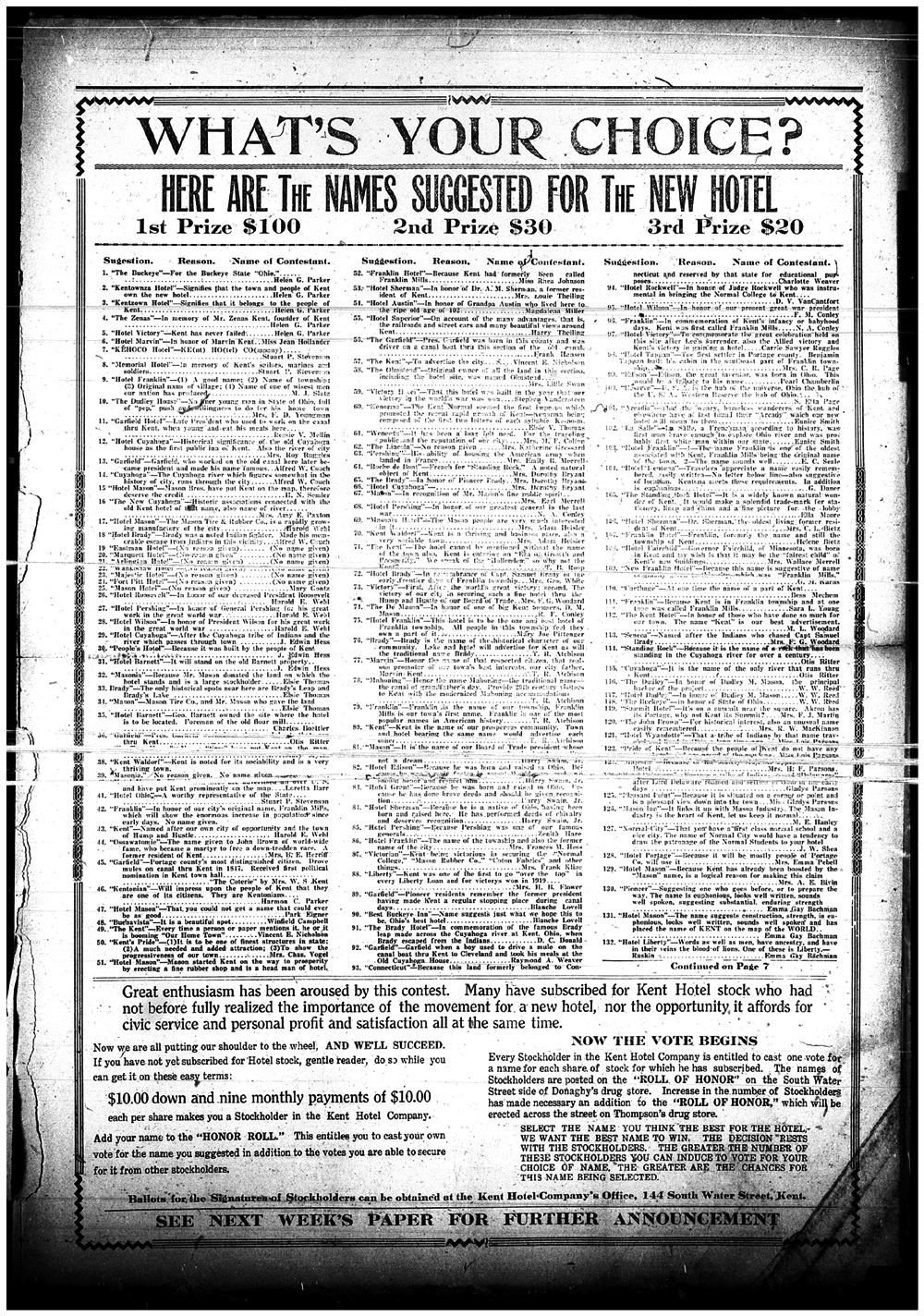
Page from a 1919 Kent Courier with some of the submitted name suggestions for the hotel

The movement to build a new hotel in Kent was started in the early 20th century and was initiated and carried out by the Kent Board of Trade, now known as the Kent Chamber of Commerce. While the village had two places of lodging, neither was very large. The previous hotel, the Revere Hotel, closed in 1899, and business leaders felt a larger, modern hotel was needed to meet the demands of growing industries, railroad travelers, and the emerging Kent State Normal College. The idea was that of Dudley Mason, the owner of Mason Tire and Rubber in Kent. The drive to fund the hotel through the selling of stock began March 24, 1919. During this time, the Board of Trade also sponsored a naming contest in the local Kent Courier newspaper, where the "Franklin Hotel" name ultimately came from, named after the previous name for Kent, Franklin Mills.

The first mortgage was bonded in August 1919 and the following month, the architect was chosen, and the Barnett property at the southwest corner of East Main and South DePeyster Streets was selected as the site. The old Barnett home was razed and excavation work started by September 11, 1919 with walls starting to rise by December 18. The hotel opened for tours to stockholders and their families on September 8 and 11, 1920, with a public opening September 12, 1920.

Despite good opening reviews, the Franklin Hotel struggled financially for most of its existence, changing owners and managers every few years. By 1934, it had been auctioned twice and many investors had lost all of their investments. Florence B. Adams of Kent Hotel Incorporated bought the building in 1934 and renovated it, re-opening in 1937 as the Hotel Kent. From 1937 into the mid 1950s, It was managed by Russell O'Conke and enjoyed what is regarded as its heyday. The hotel was stable financially and was marketed as "Ohio's Most Modern Hotel" and "Ohio's Finest Small Town Hotel".

Notable guests who stayed at the hotel during this period included Guy Lombardo, Amelia Earhart, and Glenn Miller. Eliot Ness frequented the hotel's bar in the 1940s and Kent native Martin L. Davey, who served as Governor of Ohio in the 1930s, had an office in the building.

In 1956, however, a new motel along what is now State Route 59 just east of the city limits opened, known as the Eastwood Motor Inn. It featured endorsement from AAA and other modern amenities like ample parking and air conditioning, which the Hotel Kent lacked. Other factors such as the decline in railroad travel and the emergence of the automobile led to a decrease in the need for regional hotels. In 1962, the hotel came under the management of Frank Ellis and was renamed Hotel Kent-Ellis. Financial fortunes continued to decline as two more modern motels opened in Kent: the nearby Motor Inn (later known as the Inn of Kent) in 1964 and the eight-story University Inn along South Water Street in 1970. In the 1970s, with the building in decline and the hotel operations no longer profitable, it was sold to Joseph Bujack and converted to student housing, known as the Towne House. Damage from a number of fires in the 1970s and the deteriorated state of the building led the city to condemn the upper floors in January 1979. Those floors remained vacant until 2013. The lower floors continued to be used until 2000 for a variety of small businesses such as a pizza shop, cafe, and nightclubs.

=== Decline ===
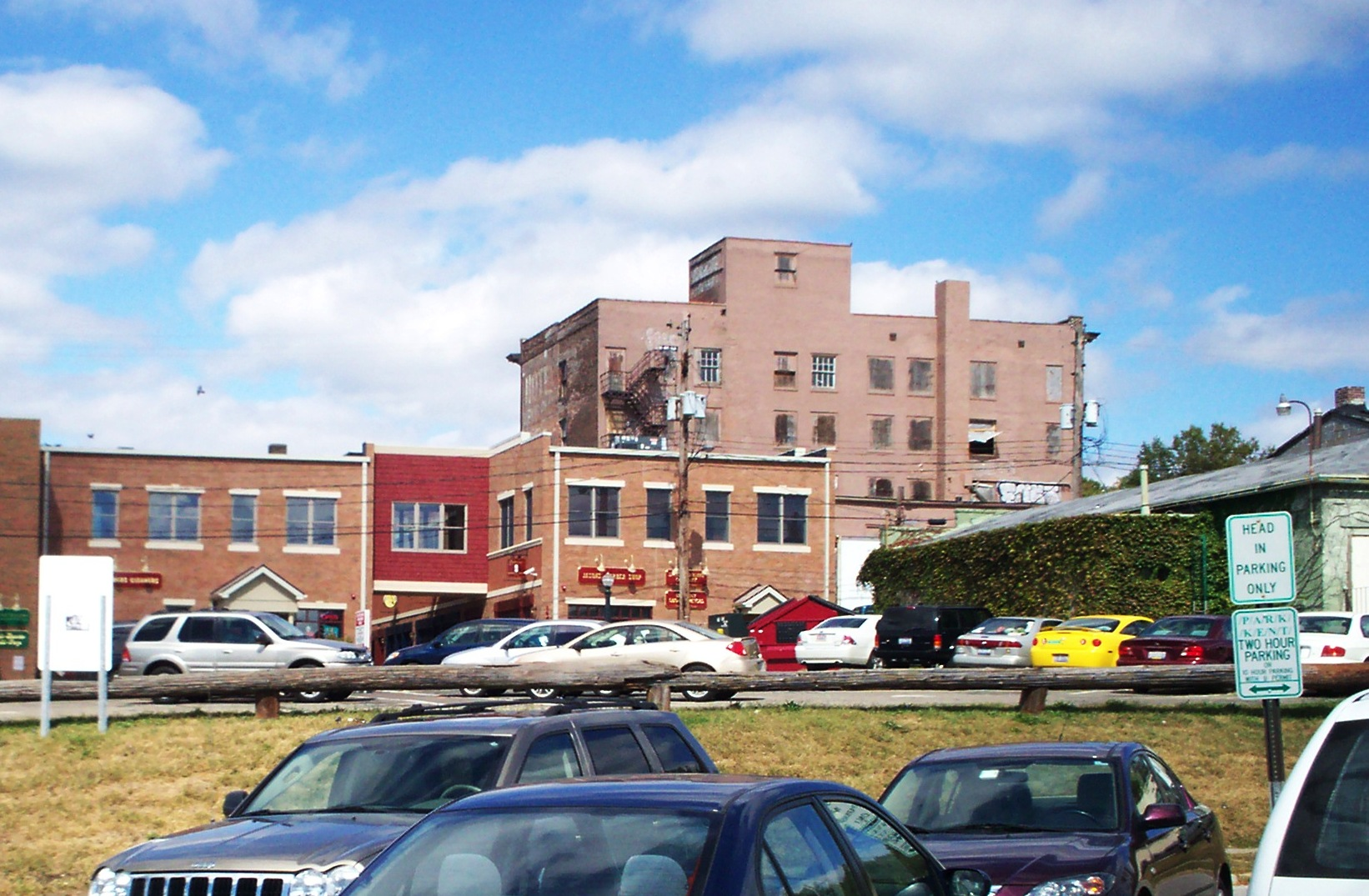
Rear view in 2010 with the first phase of Acorn Alley visible in center

Following complaints about roof damage in early 1999, the city inspected the building and found that while the building itself was structurally sound, several areas of the brick facade were loose and posed a danger to pedestrians. City inspectors also found a number of health, fire, and building codes and filed for an injunction to close the entire structure. An agreement was reached in October 1999 to make repairs, though only a few minor repairs were carried out on the brick facade, roof, and windows to prevent more pigeons from entering the upper floors. In March 2000, the remaining businesses in the building closed and the city set an April 1 deadline for Bujack to decide if he was going to renovate or raze the building. Although Bujack eventually decided to demolish the building, no work was ever started.

In March 2002, Bujack was given a court order to raze the building by March 31 or face a fine of $1,000 per day it remained standing after that. Bujack offered to give the building to Family and Community Services of Portage County, who had plans to renovate the building for apartments and retail. The plan called for the city of Kent to take temporary possession of the building, but fell through when city leaders decided the liability involved in taking ownership was too high. Other groups expressed interest in the building or the site including proposals to renovate it for use as a hotel, gradual renovation for offices and retail, and demolishing it and building a new store on the site, though none of the plans ever progressed beyond planning stages.

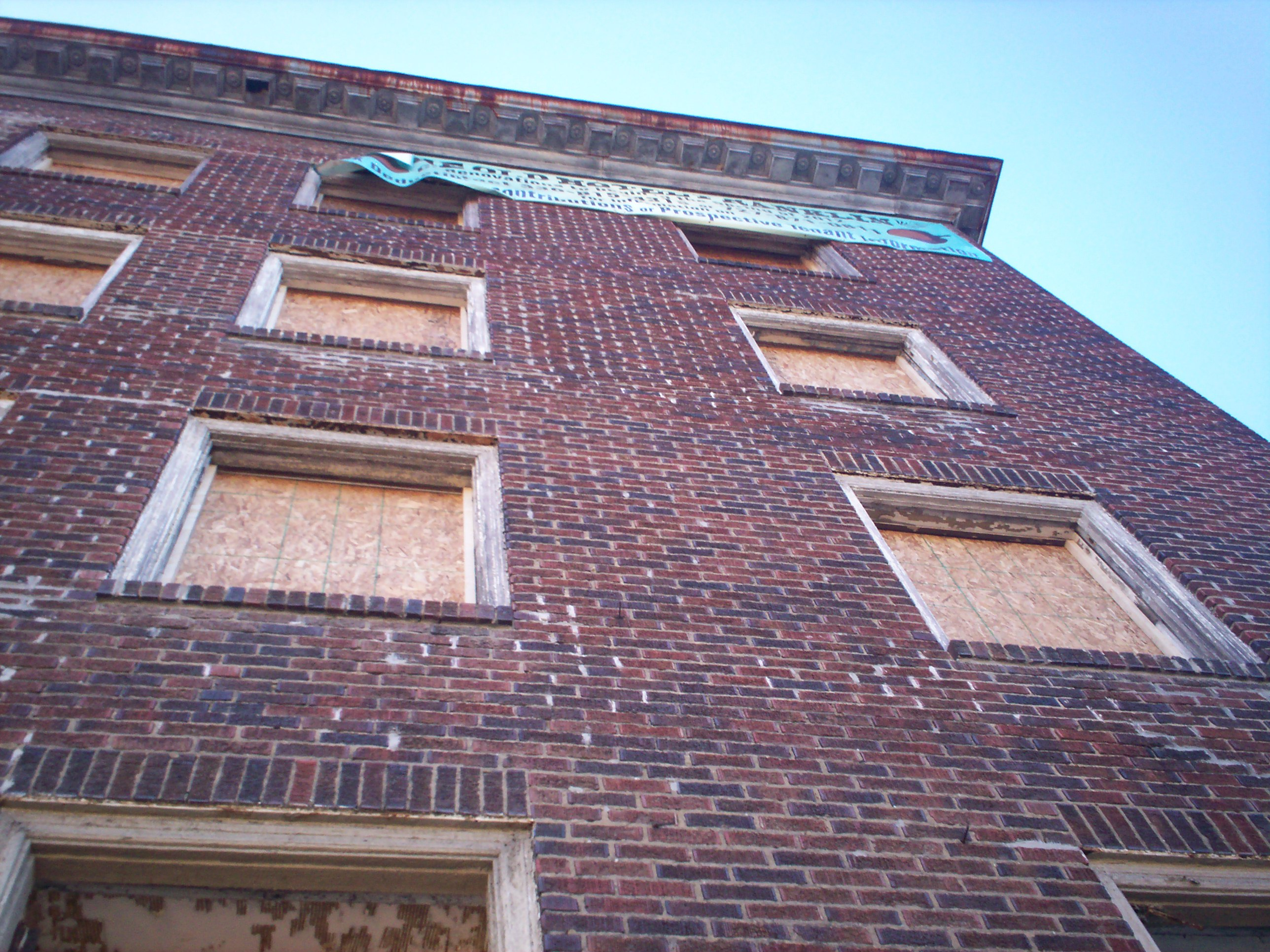
Corner view in 2012 just after interior renovations had begun

The old hotel was acquired in 2004 by Greg Vilk, a former tenant who had operated the last three businesses in the building. Vilk had sued previous owner Joseph Bujack for breach of his lease agreement and took ownership of it as part of the settlement. At the time of the transfer, Bujack owed over $308,000 in fines on the building. Vilk and his ownership group Kent LLC had plans to redevelop the building, but none of them ever materialized.

In 2007, he was given a court order to make several repairs for health and safety issues. Repairs made included cleaning of the brick facade and re-grouting the bricks in several locations, removal of several windows, and painting the rear outer wall. Inside, most of the building was gutted to help make it more presentable to potential developers. During the interior work, however, concerns were raised over whether the renovation would jeopardize efforts to obtain any federal or state preservation grants. As a result, no further renovation work was carried out, and while it was reported a development group was interested in buying the building, no changes in ownership occurred. As the building continued to deteriorate, it was described as an "eyesore" and "decrepit" along with being a safety and health hazard with several calls for its demolition.

=== Redevelopment ===
Kent City Council again approached the idea of foreclosing on the building and tearing it down in 2006. While the demolition measure was defeated, council did authorize the city to attempt to foreclose on the property. Disagreements between Vilk and the city continued for several years over the payment of the fines and liens on the building, the lack of any visible redevelopment efforts, and the increasing dilapidated state of the structure with Vilk maintaining that the city had promised to remove the liens. A 2007 court ruling ended any additional liens from being issued on the property, but did not remove the liens already in existence of $425,000.

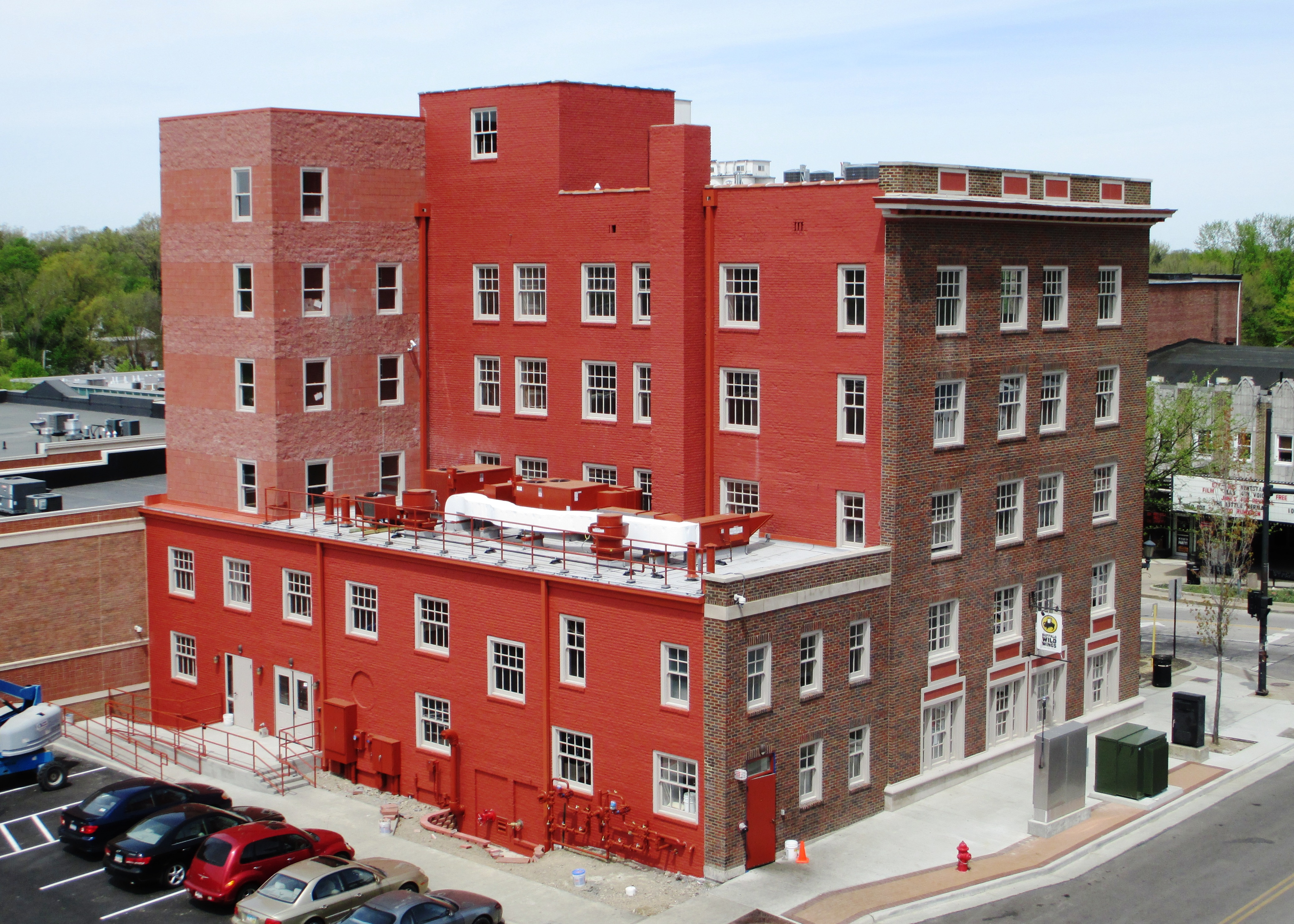
Rear of the building in May 2013 after main renovation was finished

In 2008, Vilk sued the city for $25,000 and the removal of the fines and in 2009, a judge ruled that the city had no authority to collect on the liens, instead ruling that the liens were under the jurisdiction of Portage County. Later in 2009, courts ruled that neither the city nor the county had any liens on the property, but the contempt of court fines still stood. Vilk contended that the fines were levied on the previous owner and were dormant. A settlement was reached in 2011 and the city bought the building for $735,000 before selling it to Ron Burbick a few days later for $400,000.

Prior to his purchase of the old hotel, Burbick had personally funded the Phoenix Project, which renovated and expanded two neighboring downtown buildings and tore down the house that was immediately adjacent to the west of old hotel, replacing it with a retail area known as "Acorn Alley". Acorn Alley quickly became a popular destination after opening in late 2009 and the office and retail space in the rest of the development was in high demand. The new development put increased exposure on the dilapidated state of the old hotel, which stood in contrast to the buildings around it. The Phoenix Project also helped spur additional development in the adjacent blocks of downtown Kent. Multiple development projects totaling nearly $100 million got underway in 2010, including a second phase of Acorn Alley, a new hotel and conference center, a 360-space parking deck, and additional retail and office space, all within a block of the old hotel.

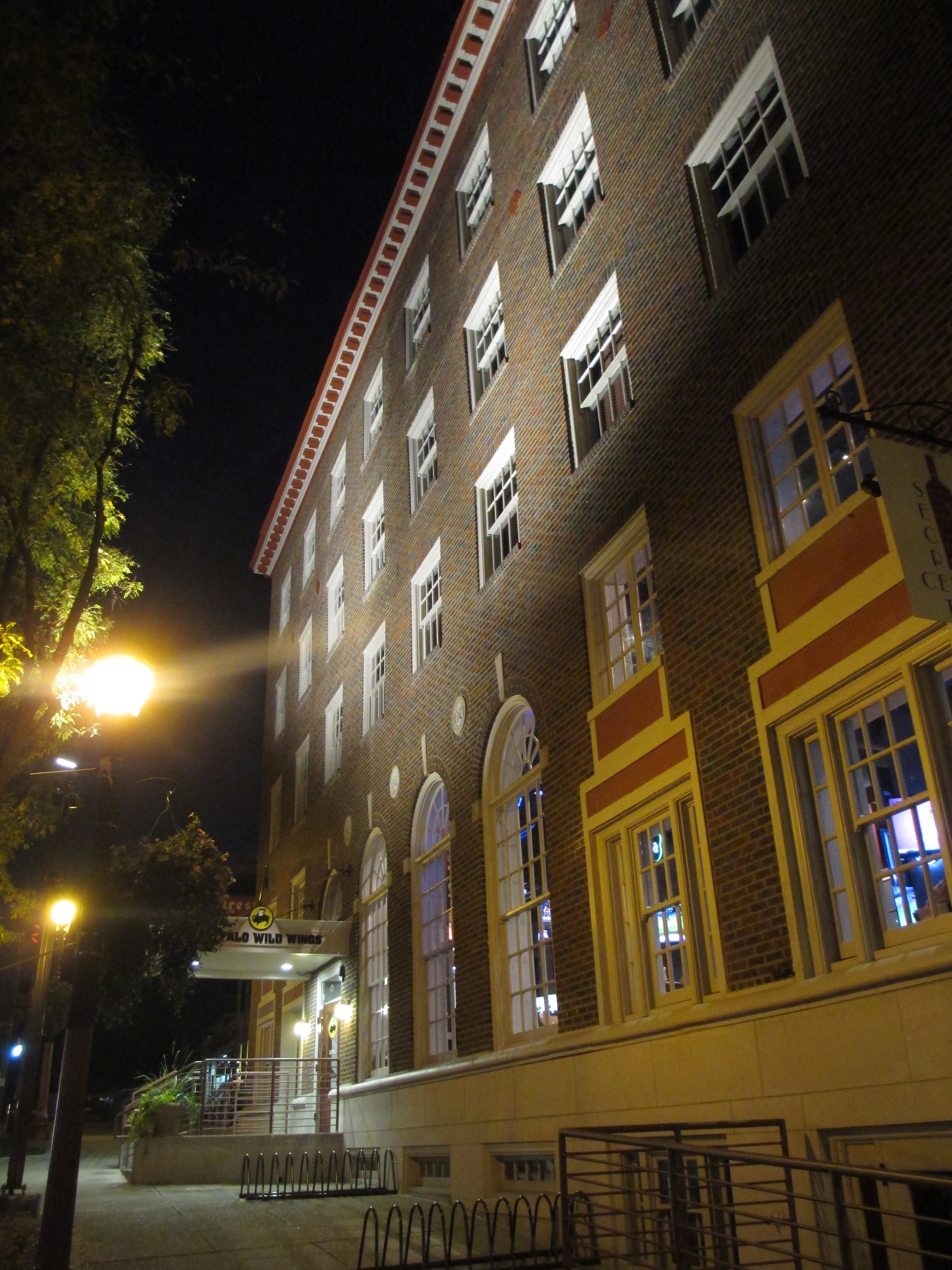
Front view, September 2013

Shortly after the sale of the building, Burbick announced plans to renovate the structure for mixed use, with retail and offices on the lower floors and apartments on the two upper floors. Tenants were announced in April 2012 with initial plans for luxury apartments on the fifth floor, transitional housing on the fourth floor for veterans, offices on the third floor, a Buffalo Wild Wings on the first and second floors, and retail in the basement, though the transitional housing was eventually removed from the plans. Burbick also announced that the building would be renamed "Acorn Corner" to complement the adjacent Acorn Alley development.

Minor renovation work started in May 2012 with asbestos and lead paint removal followed by exterior masonry work on May 22, 2012, which cleaned and re-grouted the entire brick facade. More extensive interior work began in September. In October, construction started on a new elevator shaft and stairwell added to the rear of the building which was necessitated by the original shaft being too small for modern elevator equipment. Buffalo Wild Wings opened for business April 1, 2013, and additional tenants moved into the remaining building space later in April and May. The renovation and restoration of the old hotel to become Acorn Corner was hailed by the local Record-Courier as a "Kent miracle" that brought the building "back from the dead."

== Uses ==
As of 2026, the building has two commercial tenants. Buffalo Wild Wings serves as the anchor and occupies the first and second floors, having previously been located in a building two blocks southwest on Franklin Avenue. The restaurant chain, which mentions Kent in its corporate history, contributed $1.5 million to the renovation and occupies the original hotel lobby. In the basement level is a cocktail bar and lounge called Beware of the Leopard, which opened in March 2025. It is the latest in a succession of similar bars that have been housed in the space. It replaced The Standard, an upscale bar that had opened in 2022, and prior to that, the space was home to the Franklin Hotel Bar, opened in December 2016, which featured handcrafted cocktails, small plates, fine wines, and craft beer. Prior to the Franklin Hotel Bar, the basement level housed a wine and jazz bar known as the Secret Cellar, which opened in December 2013. On the third floor are the offices, previously occupied by Marathon Financial Services and the Kent Chamber of Commerce, which once had an office in the building during the 1920s. The fourth and fifth floors are private apartments.

== Architecture ==
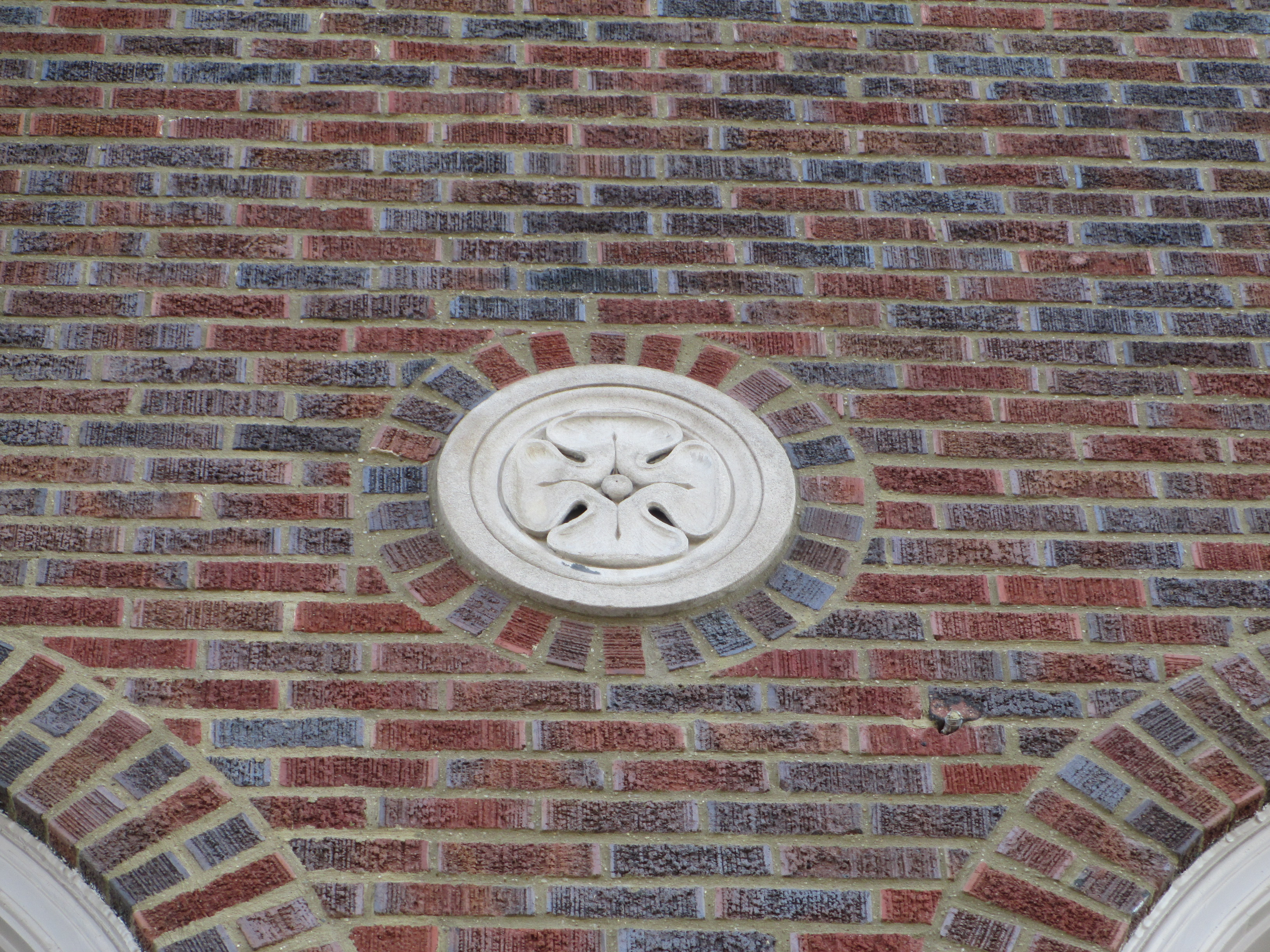
Architectural detail on the north (front) facade

The Franklin Hotel was designed by architectural firm H.L. Stevens & Company of Chicago, New York, and San Francisco. The Stevens firm had previously designed several similar hotels, including the NRHP-listed Hotel Ashtabula in Ashtabula, Ohio, which was under construction in 1919. Many other buildings designed by Stevens and his firm are also listed on the NRHP. Like several other Stevens buildings, the Franklin Hotel has a brick facade designed in the Neoclassical Revival style, a prominent architecture style of the early 20th century. The building has approximately 22,000 square feet (2,000 m^{2}) of space on six total levels, with five above ground and a partially exposed basement level, the latter due to the sloped terrain of the site.

== Historic listing ==
After acquiring the building, Ron Burbick began the process of having the building added to the NRHP to qualify for approximately $2 million of preservation grants and tax breaks to help fund the renovation, initially estimated to cost around $4 million. To aid in the process, the city of Kent also created a historic district in March 2012 that just included the hotel. The National Park Service formally added the old hotel to the NRHP on January 18, 2013. The final cost of the renovation was $6.7 million.

As part of the building being eligible for preservation grants, certain elements had to be restored, and several requirements were given for items such as new windows, signage, and interior work. Changes made to the building to comply with modern building codes and standards also had to be easily distinguishable from the original. Among the restoration work required by the Ohio Historic Preservation Office was a large painted sign on the western facade of the building, which overlooks downtown Kent. It was painted in the same location as the previous versions of the sign, which had been visible, though no longer maintained, up until the bricks were cleaned during the building's renovation in 2012.

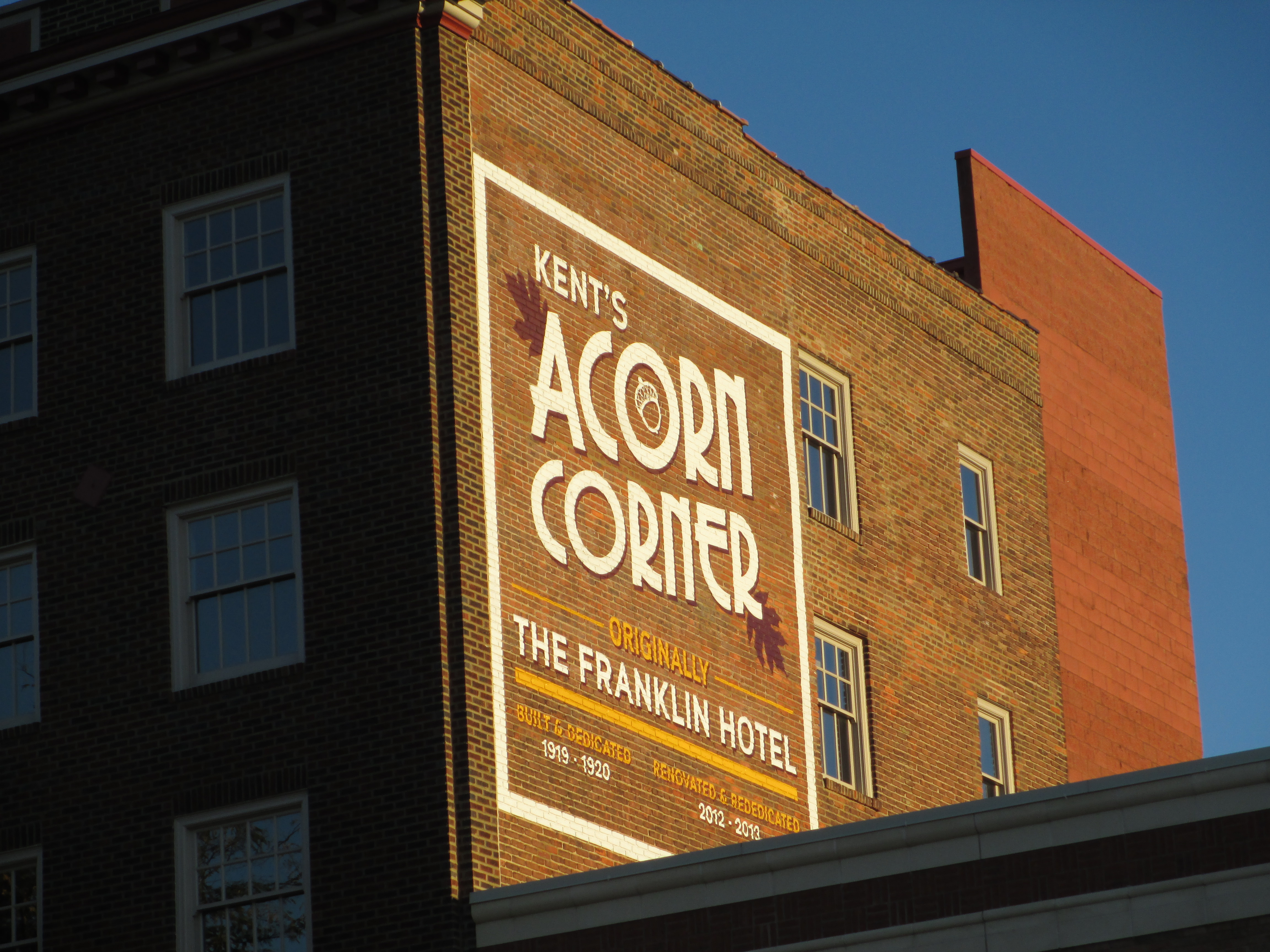
View of the sign on the western facade, with new elevator shaft partially visible on right

The building's original elevator shaft was determined to be too small for a modern elevator, so a new shaft was built onto the back of the building along with a new stairwell. As part of the restoration requirements, the exterior of the shaft had to be a different color than the building to easily distinguish it from the original structure. Its placement on the building's southwest corner was done under guidelines from the National Park Service. The original elevator shaft was used as a conduit for electrical wiring and plumbing. Additionally, one of the original entrance doors facing East Main Street had to be restored but unusable due to a ramp for the building to comply with the Americans With Disabilities Act.

Burbick had originally planned on using elements from the former Gougler Industries offices, which were from the same time period as the hotel. The owner of the former Gougler buildings, Furukawa Rock Drill USA, donated the items in 2011 after the Gougler buildings were torn down. Preservation guidelines, however, prohibited using materials from one old building in the restoration of another, so the woodwork was used to create a permanent display about Gougler Industries in the Acorn Corner building and as part of a conference room in the adjacent Acorn Alley II development.

The Franklin Hotel was nominated for the National Register of Historic Places due to its local significance in the history of Kent under criteria A and B. The building is first significant in the area of Commerce and Community Planning and Development of Criterion A because of the mobilization on the part of the Kent business community it is the result of. It is also significant under the area of Social History in Criterion B for its association with key government and business figures in the history of Kent and the early development of Kent State University. The nomination was returned as it was "not possible to pinpoint the specific significance of individuals" making Criterion A more appropriate. It was returned on September 19, 2012, and resubmitted and received on December 14, 2012. It was accepted into the National Register of Historic Places on January 18, 2013.

== See also ==
- National Register of Historic Places listings in Portage County, Ohio
