= Hotel Kirkwood =

Historic building in Des Moines, Iowa, US

- U.S. National Register of Historic Places
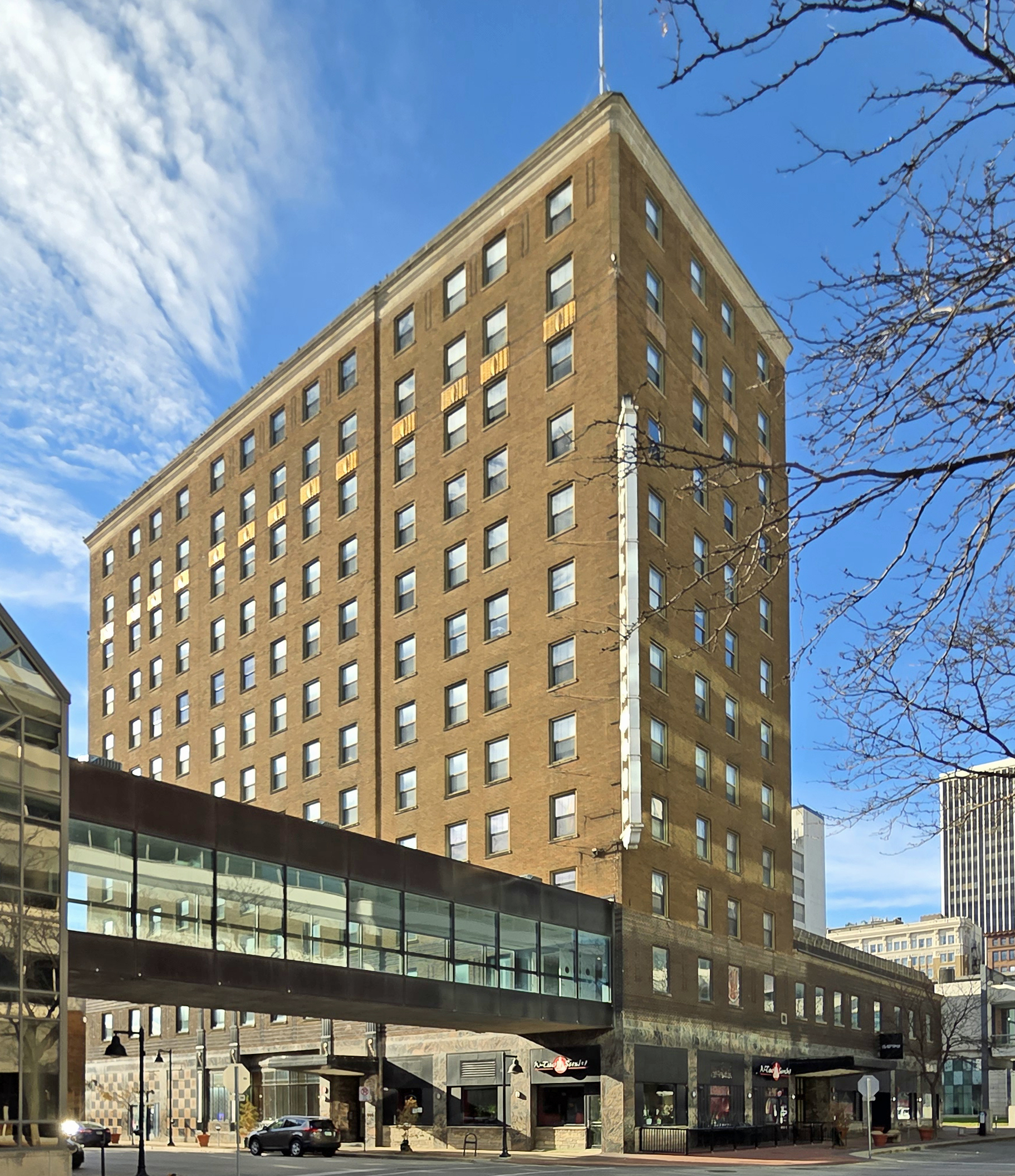
- The Hotel Kirkwood viewed from the northeast

- Location within Iowa Location within the United States
- Location: 400 Walnut Street, Des Moines, Iowa
- Coordinates: 41°35′10″N 93°37′20″W
- Area: less than one acre
- Built: 1930
- Architect: H.L. Stevens and Company
- Architectural style: Art Deco
- NRHP reference No.: 03001256
- Added to NRHP: December 10, 2003

The Hotel Kirkwood, also known as the Kirkwood Civic Center Hotel, is a historic building located in downtown Des Moines, Iowa, United States. The building was designed by the Chicago architectural firm of H.L. Stevens & Company and built in 1930. With its completion it became the largest hotel along Fourth Street between Walnut Street and Court Avenue, along Des Moines' "Hotel Row." It also marked the emergence of the skyscraper hotel in the downtown Des Moines. The new hotel replaced a previous Hotel Kirkwood, built on the same site in 1862. It was located near Union Station and the Rock Island Depot. Developers and owners of the 1930 Hotel Kirkwood were E.F. Tagney and S.F. McGinn. Art Deco details are found in the building's massing, the sleek exterior geometrical detailing, and treatment of the cornice. The 12-story brick structure rises to a height of 133 feet (41 m). It was listed on the National Register of Historic Places in 2003. The building has subsequently been converted into an apartment building called "The Kirkwood."

== Gallery ==
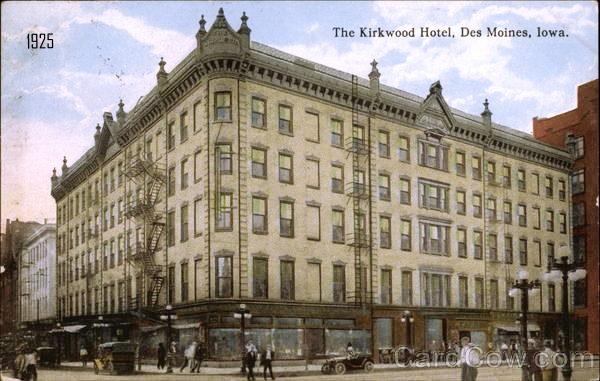
Postcard of the 1862 Hotel Kirkwood, c. 1925.

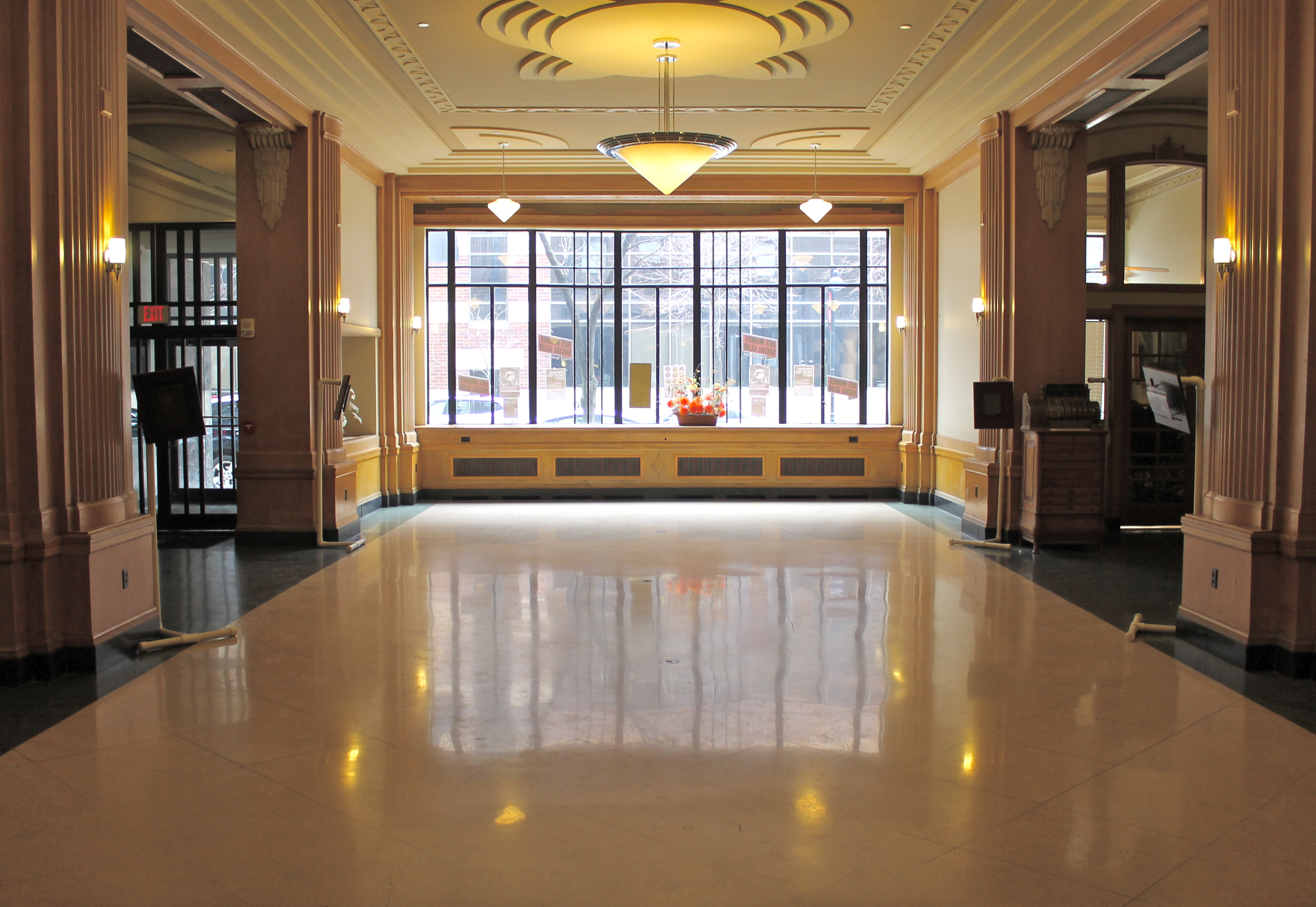
The lobby of the former Kirkwood Hotel. Now a venue for classical music and events.

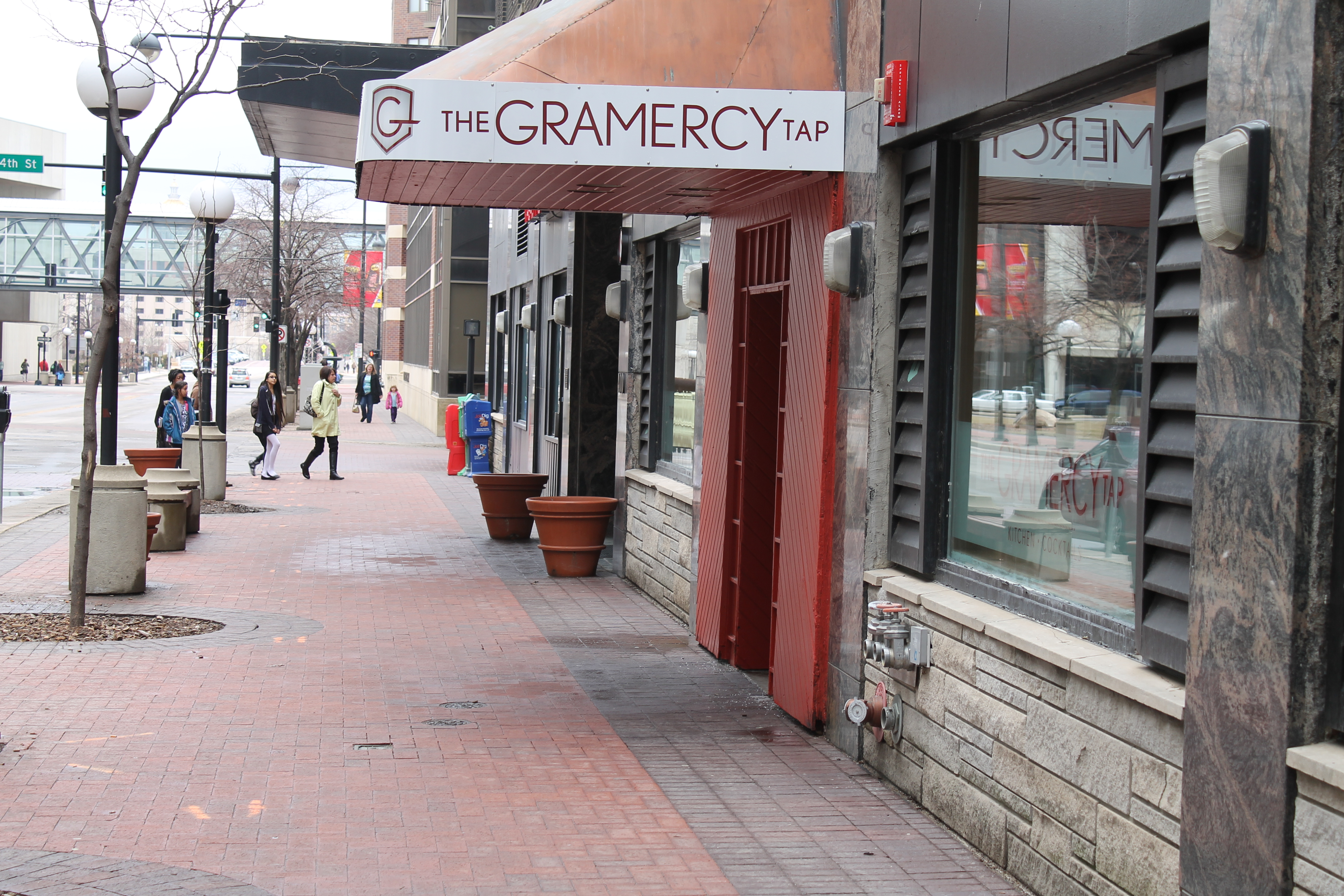
Restaurants that line Walnut Street in Downtown Des Moines.

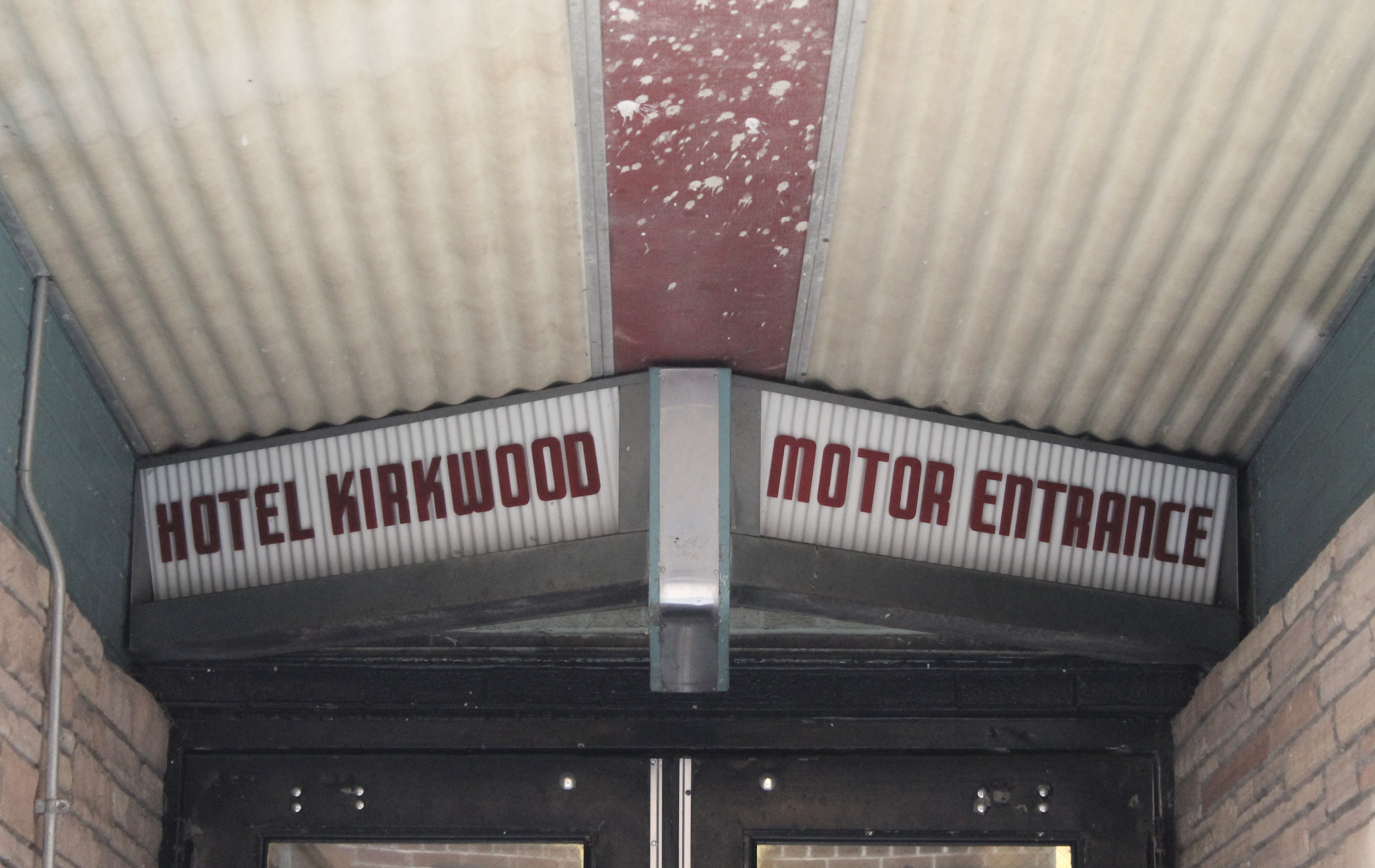
The valet stand to the Kirkwood Hotel. Now the garage entrance for residents of the luxury apartments that occupy the former hotel.
