= Elston Hall =

- Hotel Van Curler
- U.S. National Register of Historic Places
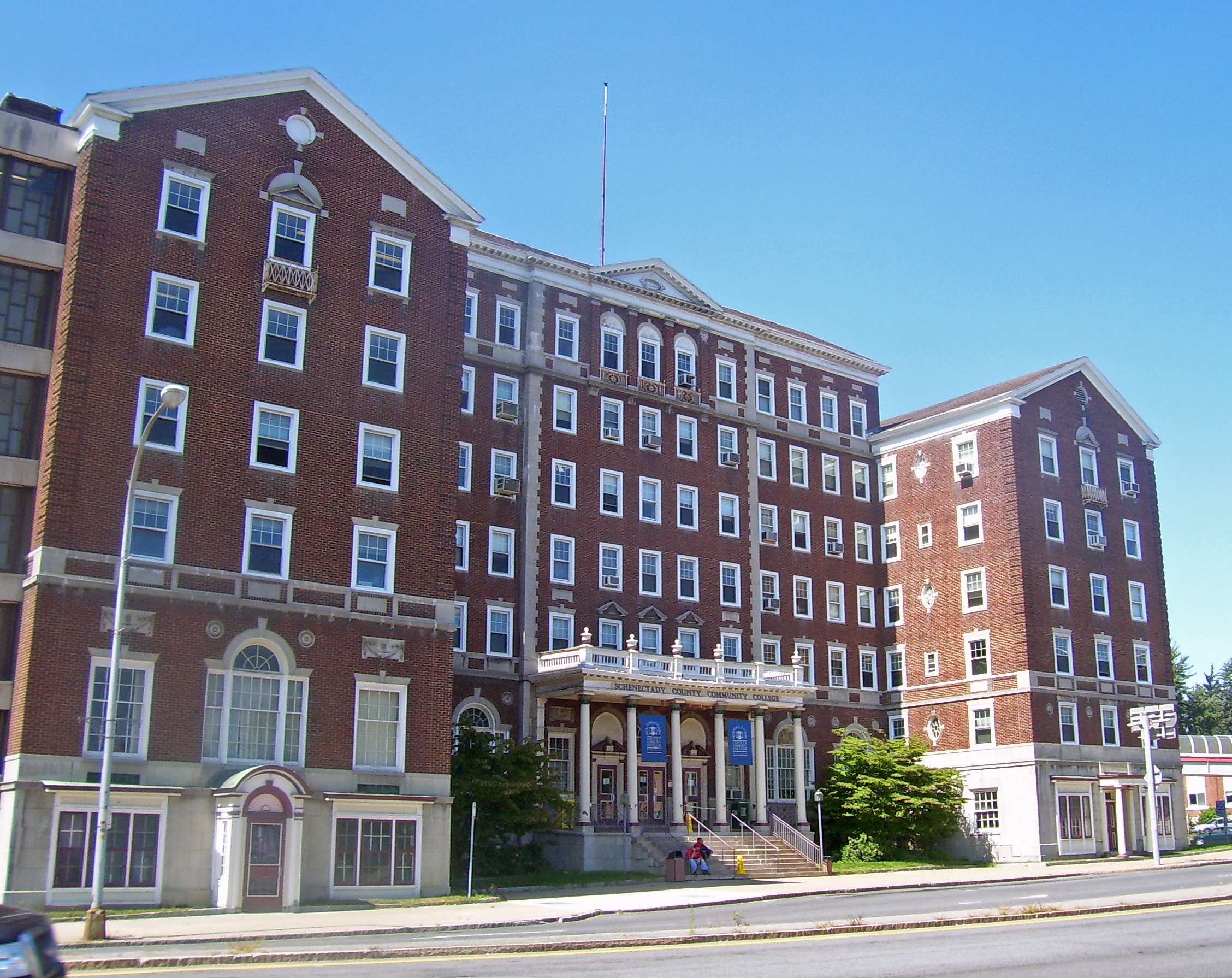
- East (front) elevation, 2008

- Location within New York Location within the United States
- Interactive map showing the location of Elston Hall
- Location: Schenectady, NY
- Coordinates: 42°48′52″N 73°56′59″W
- Built: 1925
- Architect: H.L. Stephens and Co.
- Architectural style: Georgian Revival
- NRHP reference No.: 85002277
- Added to NRHP: 1985

Elston Hall, formerly the Hotel Van Curler, is located on Washington Street in the city of Schenectady, New York, United States. It is a tall brick building constructed in 1925 in the Classical Revival architectural style.

Its construction was partially financed by local employers General Electric and the American Locomotive Company, which needed space for new workers to live and wanted an architecturally distinctive building comparable with large city hotels of the era. Today, it is one of the main buildings of Schenectady County Community College.

== Building ==
Elston Hall is located at the northeast corner of the 57-acre (23 ha) college property, right at the corner of State (NY 5) and Washington streets. Only the two acres (8,000 m^{2}) on which the building sits is included in the listing. To the south Washington feeds into Interstate 890; the Schenectady Armory, also listed on the National Register, is located almost across Washington. Directly across from the building, on the east side of Washington, is a garden with a fountain. On the north Washington is part of the Stockade Historic District, the oldest section of Schenectady. One block to the west, State crosses the Mohawk River via the Western Gateway Bridge to Scotia.

=== Exterior ===
The building itself is six stories high, faced in limestone-trimmed brick over a reinforced concrete frame. It is H-shaped, with the north wing shorter than the south due to an extension of the main dining room, topped by a gabled roof with wooden eaves shingled in slate. Some other wings have been built on to the structure since the college began using it. They are too modern to be considered contributing to its historic character.

Six Corinthian columns support the main entrance portico. Its entablature, with the words "SCHENECTADY COUNTY COMMUNITY COLLEGE" on it in metal lettering, is topped by a dentilled cornice and flat roof with balustrade. Each pillar of the balustrade continues a column below and is topped with a decorative carved urn.

The basement level is marked by a stone watercourse. The first floor is fenestrated with alternating rectangular and Palladian windows, and has a belt course of alternating brick and stone dividing it and the second story. White rosettes are between them and their lintels are of white stone with a keystone motif. Some windows are further embellished with swag-decorated friezes. The front doors are surmounted by broken-arch pediments with carved acorns set in blind arches.

Decoration is more limited on the upper stories, with each window having just a simple stone sill and lintel. Another belt course like the lower one sets off the top story. The sixth floor's three central windows are each topped with a blind lunette and have iron balconies. The central five bays of the main block are further set off by rusticated stone quoins at the corner and five brick pilasters supporting a pediment and balustrade on the roofline.

On the wings, there are similar touches. The south side's main entrance is a domed portico with classical detail, matched on the north wing by Ionic columns supporting a flat, dentilled entablature. The belt courses and fenestration are similar to those on the main block. The central window of the fifth (top) story on each wing is marked by a blind carved lunette and balcony, with a blind oculus in the gable. On the inner walls, the central of the three bays has a small circular or square window, alternating by story.

A two-story kitchen wing projects from the north. Its windows have been bricked in but have similar decorative patterns (arches and rectangles) to the rest of the building. Two more modern wings, neither contributing, extend from it as well, as does as a large wing from the south of similar materials to the main block. Three emergency exit towers on the corners of the building likewise do not contribute as modern additions.

=== Interior ===
The first floor retains much of its original finishing. The lobby is in a Georgian mode, with pillars, pilasters and paneling. Its flooring is terrazzo with a genuine marble as a wall base. Another keystoned, lunetted door leads to the Lobby Lounge. Other designs from the exterior, such as the broken-arched niches with acorns, are also repeated inside.

The Lobby Lounge itself, now known as the Mohawk Room, is a 50-by-33-foot (15 by 10 m) room with a semicircular wall. Five sets of double doors overlook the garden and river beyond. Its fireplaces and lunettes on the interior doors are original. The fanlights on the exterior doors are also original but they have been covered with shells on the inside to conceal indirect interior lighting.

Just off the Lobby Lounge, the Reception Room now serves as the college president's office. It has most of its original finishes and has not been altered. The former Dining Room and Assembly Room were combined to make a single Ballroom, and are still together today although they can be divided with a partition. Its original western wall has mostly been removed. What was originally a small private dining room between the Lobby Lounge and Dining Room has now become part of a hallway connecting the building and its western annex. It is lit by the only remaining original chandelier in the hotel building.

The upper stories have been gutted to serve college purposes. Nothing of their original layout or finish is left.

== Aesthetics ==
H.L. Stevens & Co., the hotel's designers, specialized in small (less than 500 rooms) hotels and apartment houses in a neo-Georgian or Colonial Revival style in either a rectangular or H-shape, seen by the city's Chamber of Commerce as a refreshing change from the small, squarish hotels the city had previously possessed. Their buildings, primarily in the Northeast, are in many cases still extant and show similarities to the Van Curler.

Most similar to the Van Curler is the Burritt Hotel in New Britain, Connecticut, also listed on the Register. It is also of brick, has nearly identical limestone decoration and is also H-shaped. The Colonial Hotel in Gardner, Massachusetts, also has a similar design except for the projecting wings and the Federal style decoration at the top.

To facilitate it use as a center for local functions, it was designed so that the ballrooms could be entered without having to cross the lobby, seen as the space for commercial travelers. The Georgian Revival style was used for other buildings in the city at the same period, most notably City Hall in 1933.

== History ==
In the 35 years leading up to the hotel's 1925 construction, Schenectady's population quintupled, making it the fastest-growing city in New York. It became ten times as wealthy. Both of these developments were a result of the city becoming the headquarters of General Electric (GE) and the American Locomotive Company (ALCO). The two corporations contributed $300,000 of the hotel's $700,000 ($12.9 million in contemporary dollars) construction cost. The local Chamber of Commerce and a thousand citizens filled in the rest. It was named after Arendt van Curler, the Dutch explorer who first saw the site of Schenectady in 1661. Ultimately it would cost $1.1 million ($20.2 million in contemporary dollars)

The Stevens firm was chosen for the design, due to its successful similar contemporary buildings. A branch of the Mohawk River, the Binne Kill was filled in, streets were widened, a sea wall was built along the Mohawk to the Rotterdam line, and streets were widened. The hotel was publicly owned, so some smaller nearby hotels were torn down to eliminate competition. The building became a focus of civic pride, hosting many major events even as the city declined due to suburbanization, GE began moving work elsewhere and ALCO went into decline along with its industry.

In addition to the many local functions it hosted, it became a popular lunch spot for workers at the nearby GE plant. Among its many notable guests over the years were then-governor Franklin D. Roosevelt and his wife Eleanor, John Philip Sousa, Clement Attlee and Robert F. Kennedy.

In 1954 the additions were built to accommodate the increasing demands of business travelers. Every one of the new rooms had air conditioning and a private bath. These rooms rented well, but increasingly guests preferred them to the old section of the hotel, with an overall negative effect on the hotel's occupancy rate.

It declared bankruptcy in 1968. Schenectady County bought the building at the ensuing public auction for $710,000 ($6.57 million in contemporary dollars), and converted it for its current use by the college. The college's board of trustees renamed it after Charles Elston, the longtime chairman of the county's Board of Representatives.

== See also ==
- National Register of Historic Places listings in Schenectady County, New York
