= Iowana Hotel =

- U.S. National Register of Historic Places
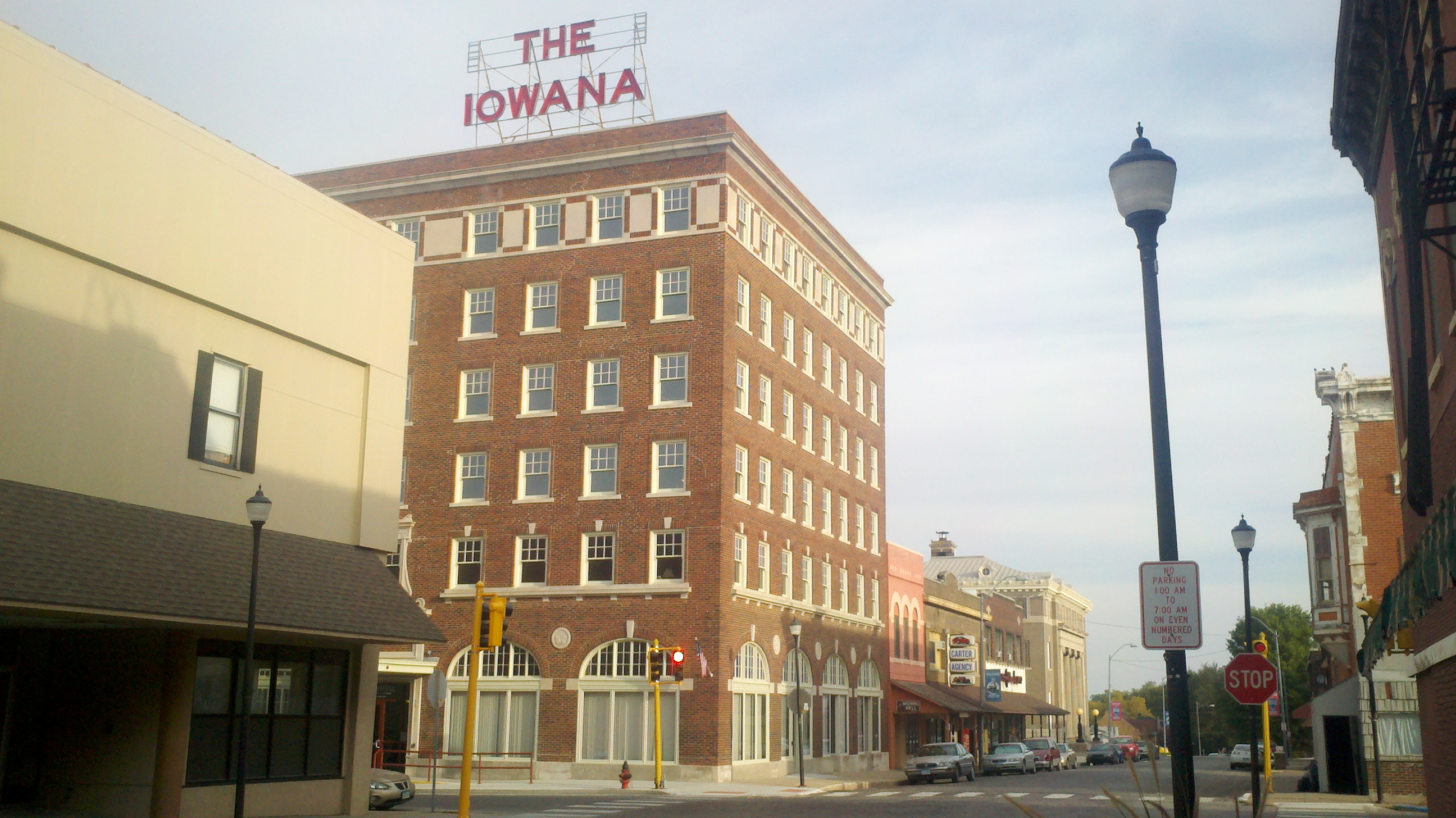

- Location within Iowa Location within the United States
- Location: 203 W. Montgomery St. Creston, Iowa
- Coordinates: 41°03′31″N 94°21′47″W
- Area: less than one acre
- Built: 1919-1920
- Architect: H.L. Stevens & Company
- Architectural style: Early Commercial
- NRHP reference No.: 09000298
- Added to NRHP: May 12, 2009

The Iowana Hotel, now known simply as The Iowana, is a historic building located in Creston, Iowa, United States. Because Creston was on the mainline of the Chicago, Burlington and Quincy Railroad, and it was a divisional headquarters, it received a steady flow of visitors. Hotels that featured fireproof construction and modern amenities, such as this one, started to enter Iowa's secondary markets in the 1910s and 1920s. A group of local businessmen formed the Hotel Investment Company, and built the hotel. They hired the Chicago architectural firm H.L. Stevens & Company, known for its hotels, to design and build the Iowana. The building was constructed from 1919 to 1920. It served as Creston's primary hotel until about 1958 when more convenient and economical motels were built along the highway. By this time rail travel was declining and highway travel was increasing. The Hotel Investment Company sold the building in 1971. It continued in operation under various owners into the 1980s. The building was listed on the National Register of Historic Places in 2009. It stood vacant for several years until it was transformed into an apartment building.

The six-story brick building measures 80 by 66 feet (24 by 20 m). A 40-by-66-foot (12 by 20 m) annex is located to the west. The upper floors are set back in the rear and form an L-shape. Over-all, the Early Commercial style structure is plain in appearance. The decorative details are found in the wide first floor windows of the commercial space that feature elliptical arches with cast stone spring blocks and keystones. Another decorative feature is found at the top of the building where a modified entablature incorporates the brick-framed windows and the stucco panels between them into the architrave. Above it is a simple brick wall that acts as a frieze and a cast stone cornice above it.
