= Savery Hotel =

- U.S. National Register of Historic Places
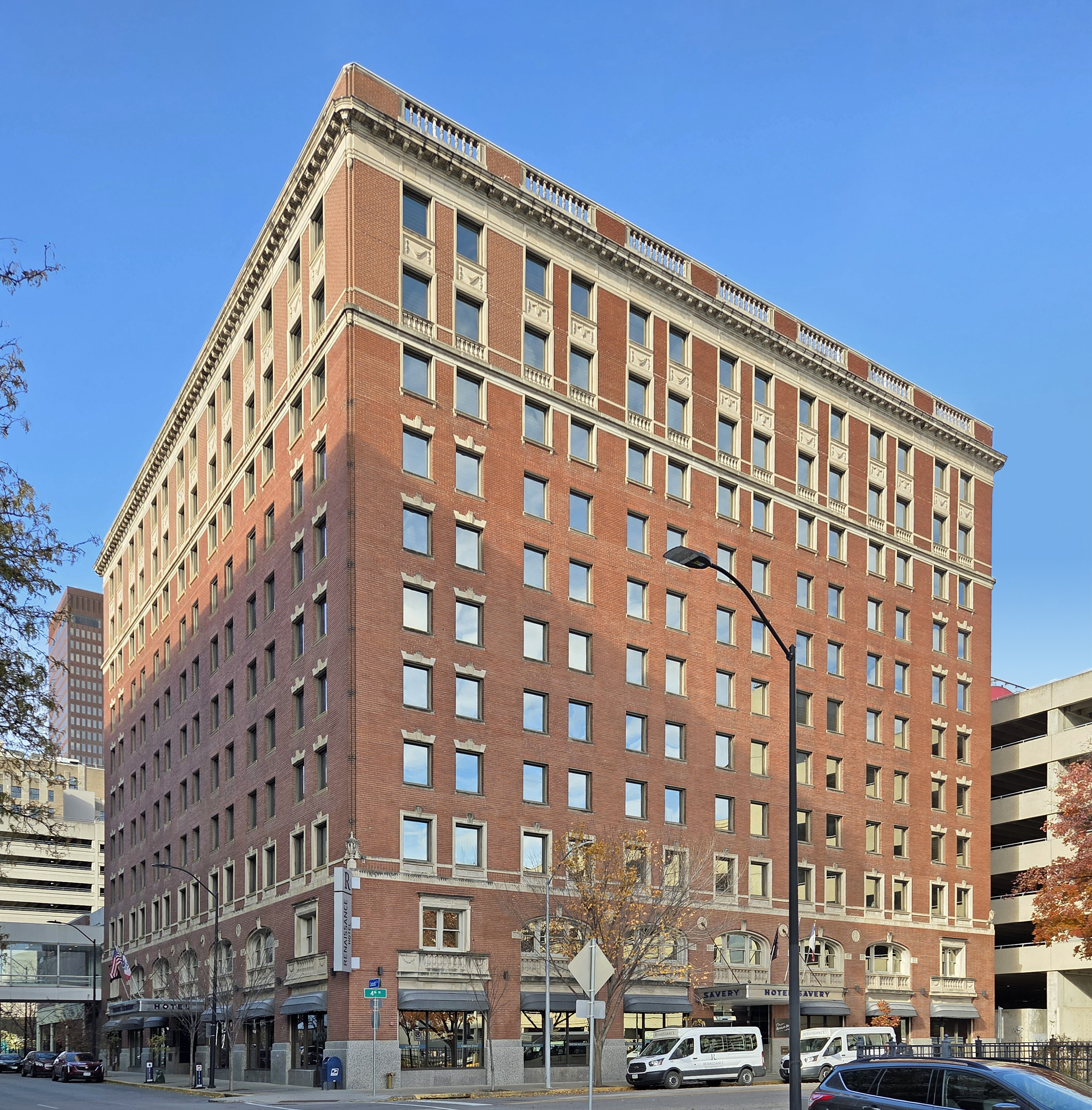
- The Savery Hotel from the east

- Location within Iowa Location within the United States
- Location: 401 Locust Street, Des Moines, Iowa
- Coordinates: 41°35′15″N 93°37′22″W
- Area: less than one acre
- Built: 1919
- Architect: H.L. Stevens & Co.
- Architectural style: Colonial Revival
- NRHP reference No.: 98001324
- Added to NRHP: November 5, 1998

The Savery Hotel, now known as the Renaissance Des Moines Savery Hotel, is a historic building in downtown Des Moines, Iowa, United States. This is the third hotel in the city with that name and the second at this location. The prominent Chicago hotel design firm H.L. Stevens & Company designed the 233-room hotel in the Colonial Revival style, which was a rare choice for commercial architecture in Des Moines. The hotel is an eleven-story brick building that rises 140 feet (43 m) above the ground. Opened in 1919, it has additions completed in 1952 and 1953. Across the alley to the west is an annex that was completed circa 1899 for the previous hotel building. During World War II, Des Moines was the location for the first Women's Army Auxiliary Corps (WAAC) training center. The Savery augmented the facilities at Fort Des Moines and served as the induction center, barracks, mess hall, and classrooms from 1942 to 1945.

Notable guests who have stayed here include First Lady Eleanor Roosevelt, President Harry S. Truman, and actress Carol Channing, who required a window she could open for fresh air before she would stay here. Entertainer Tiny Tim lived for nearly eight years at the Savery in the 1980s.

The hotel was listed on the National Register of Historic Places in 1998. It was extensively renovated in 1999 and again in 2016–2017.

== Popular culture ==
In the Jane Smiley novel A Thousand Acres, Ginny and Ty spend their wedding night at the Savery Hotel.
