= Randolph Hotel (Des Moines, Iowa) =

- Hotel Randolph
- U.S. National Register of Historic Places
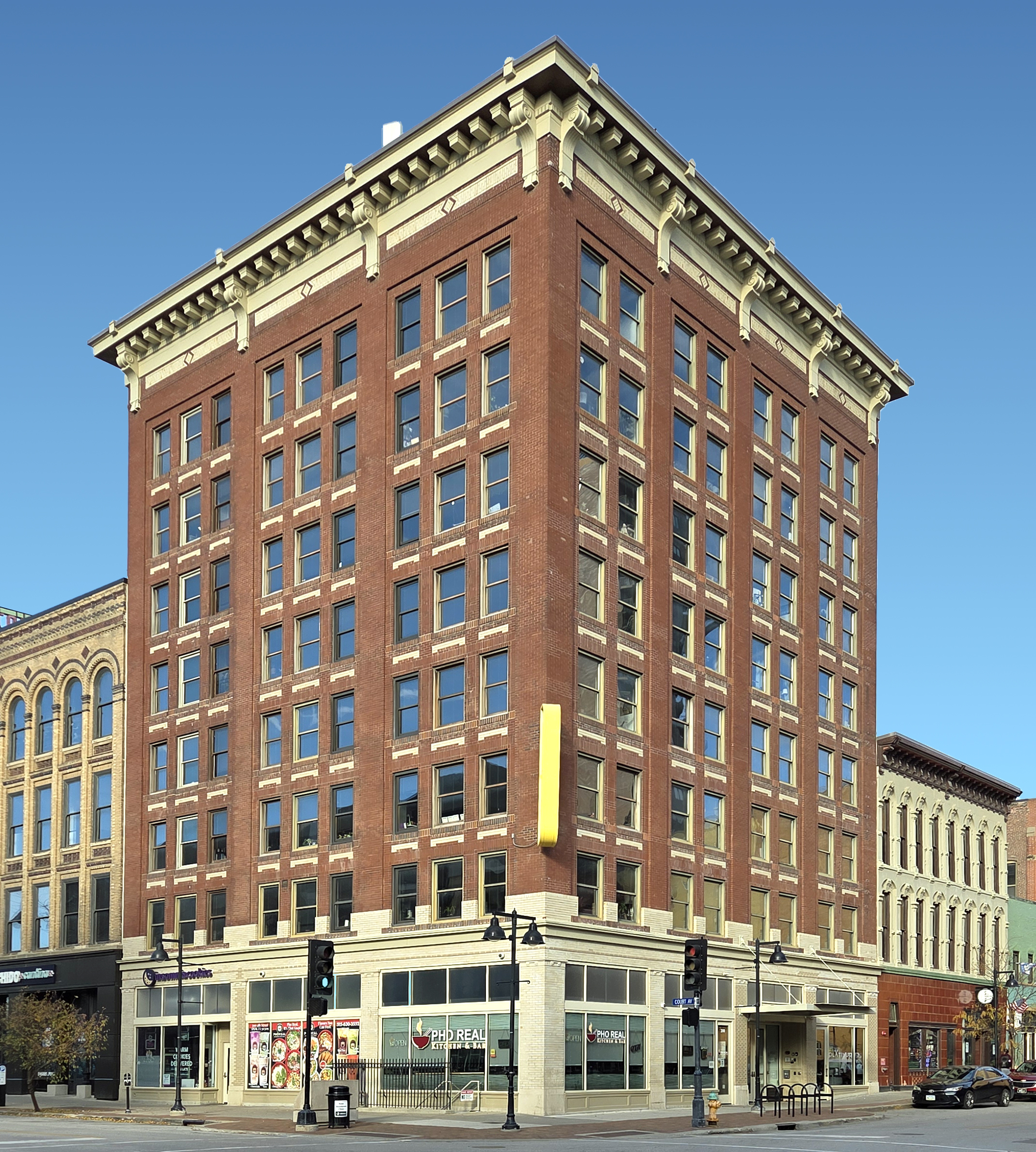
- The Randolph Hotel viewed from the southeast

- Location within Iowa
- Location: 200–204 4th Street, Des Moines, Iowa
- Coordinates: 41°35′7″N 93°37′19″W
- Area: <1 acres
- Built: 1912
- Architect: H. L. Stevens Co.
- NRHP reference No.: 09000403
- Added to NRHP: June 11, 2009

The Randolph Hotel or Hotel Randolph is a nine-story hotel located in Des Moines, Iowa, United States. This hotel was designed and built by the H.L. Stevens & Company in 1911. It rents rooms for a weekly rate. Most guests are considered long term, meaning they stay for more than thirty consecutive days. The Randolph Hotel is located on the corner of Fourth Street and Court Avenue downtown, along the historic Court Avenue strip.

It is an eight-story hotel "constructed in 1912 as the first tall and only 'absolutely fireproof hotel' in the city." Ironically there was a fire on February 19, 2010. It is located at 200–204 4th Street in the downtown commercial district of Des Moines.

The property was added to the National Register of Historic Places (NRHP) on June 11, 2009, and the listing was announced as the featured listing in the National Park Service's weekly list of June 19, 2009.

In 2008, rehabilitation of the building into low- and moderate-income rental housing, to be funded in part by federal and state historic preservation tax credits, was planned.
