= Schenectady County Community College =

Community college in Schenectady, New York, U.S.

SUNY Schenectady
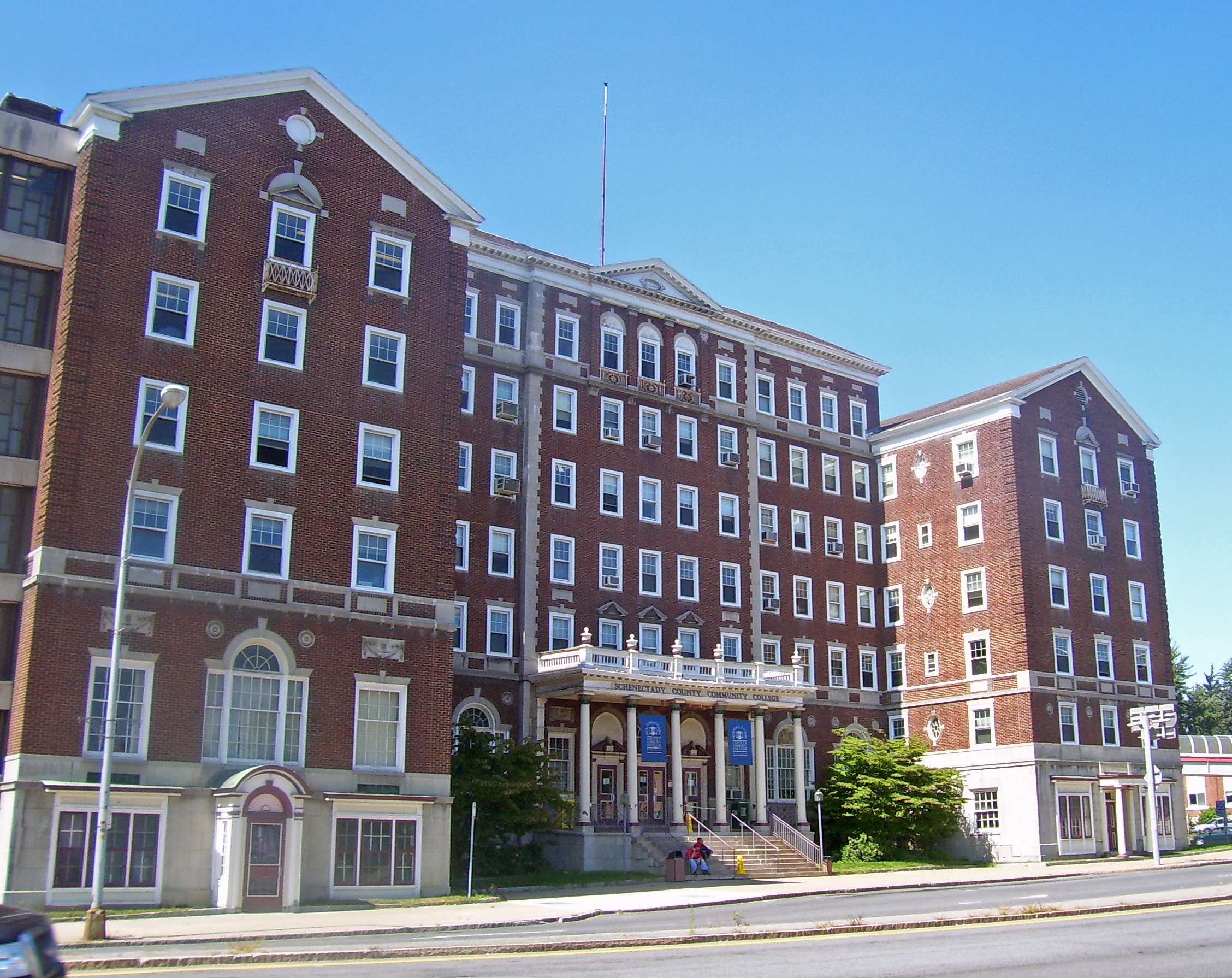
- Elston Hall
- Type: Public community college
- Established: 1967; 59 years ago
- Parent institution: State University of New York
- President: Nicole Reaves
- Undergraduates: 3,900 (fall 2025)
- Location: (United States) Schenectady, New York, United States; 42.814513°N 73.950799°W
- Campus: Urban 57 acres (0.23 km^{2})
- Colors: Royal blue and gold
- Nickname: Royals
- Sporting affiliations: National Junior College Athletic Association, Region II, Mountain Valley Athletic Conference
- Mascot: Royal the Duck
- Website: www.sunysccc.edu

SUNY Schenectady is a public community college in Schenectady, New York, United States. It is part of the State University of New York (SUNY) system. It was established in 1967 in the Van Curler Hotel in Downtown Schenectady and has undergone multiple expansions throughout the following decades.

== History ==
The Schenectady County Board of Representatives formed SUNY Schenectady County Community College on January 26, 1967 and then purchased the former Van Curler hotel which required renovations so that classes could commence in the building in 1969. The Van Curler would be renamed Elston Hall after Charles W. Elston, the long-standing, original board member and eight-year chairperson for the Schenectady County Board of Representatives.

The first of a number of expansions occurred in 1978, with the building that houses the Begley Library, a television station, lecture halls, and a wing for the music department along with the Carl B. Taylor Community Auditorium. A 1982 expansion added the Tempo Building, housing four classrooms and continuing education. 1987 brought the Center for Science and Technology, while 1992 saw the creation of a new student center which included a cafeteria, college store, and student lounge, along with biology and geology labs and fifteen classrooms. Also completed in 1992 was the South Wing expansion which created four new culinary arts labs, expanded upon the Casola Dining Room, a childcare center, and an enclosed bridge that connected Elston Hall with the Center for Science and Technology which is located across the street from the school's main campus.

In 2000 the Gateway Building was erected for childhood development classes and a childcare center. The next year the Stockade Building was built in order to house six computer classrooms, nine general classrooms, two lecture halls, conference rooms and offices for the Continuing Education Division and Capital District World Trade Center. Additionally, a new quad area was built in front of Elston Hall.

In 2006 a $6.3 million expansion to the Culinary Arts department began off of Elston Hall and was completed in 2007. This expansion was funded in part by fund raising activities along with $3,082,300 from the County of Schenectady.

== SUNY Delhi Partnership ==
Students interested in attaining a bachelor's degree may do so through a partnership between Schenectady County Community College and the State University of New York at Delhi at SCCC. The purpose of the program has been to allow potential students with jobs, family, and other commitments that prevent them from enrolling in these programs on the campus in Delhi, NY. The current SUNY Delhi Coordinator of Inter-Institutional Programs is Tracey Caponera.

Degrees offered include:

- BBA in Hospitality Management with concentrations in Hotel & Resort Management or Travel & Tourism
- BBA in Business & Technology Management with a concentration in Technology
- BSN in Nursing - Online Program Only

== Cost of attendance ==
The 2017–2018 school year tuition is $3,936 for a New York State resident attending SUNY SCCC full-time, or $164 per credit for a part-time student. Non-New York State resident tuition is $7,872 for full-time tuition or $328 per credit for part-time students. Other expenses are approximately $1,247 for full-time students and $514 for part-time students, this estimate does not include room-and-board as the college currently does not have on-campus housing.

== Admissions and demographics ==
As of 2016, the student body is approximately 55% female and 45% male. 79% of the students come from the New York Capital District Region with 18% coming from neighboring counties and 3% from other counties. The average age of full-time students is 24, while the average part-time student is 31 years old. The Student/Faculty ratio is 23-to-1 with an average class size of 24 students.

== Athletics ==
SUNY SCCC is a member of the National Junior College of Athletics Association (NJCAA) Region III and the Mountain Valley Conference.

Sports offered:

- Baseball (men)
- Basketball (men & women)
- Bowling (men & women)
- Crew (women)

== Notable alumni ==
Thomasina Winslow (1965–2023), musician
