= Burritt Hotel =

- U.S. National Register of Historic Places
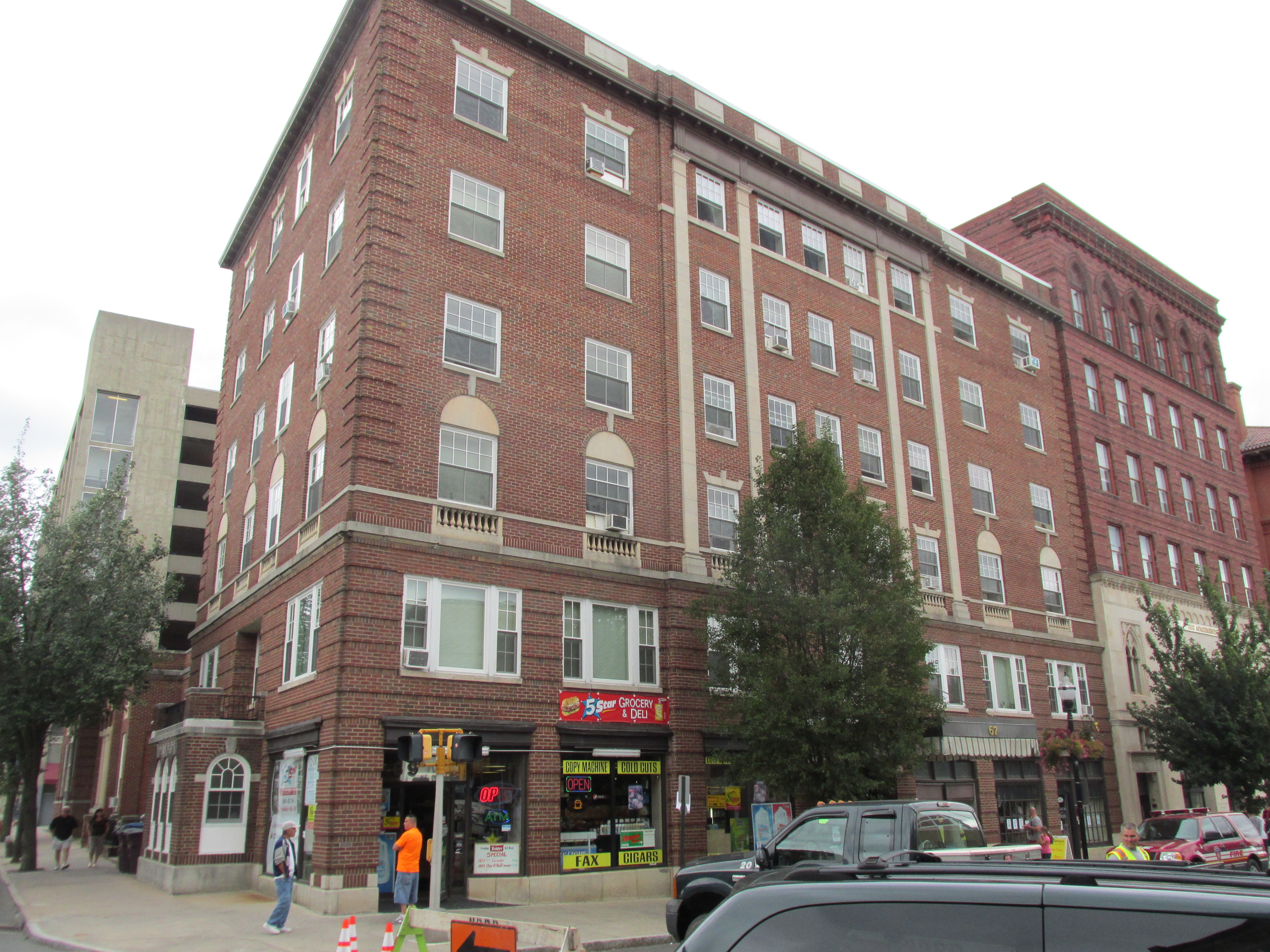

- Location within Connecticut Location within the United States
- Location: 67 West Main Street, New Britain, Connecticut
- Coordinates: 41°40′4″N 72°47′1″W
- Area: 0.3 acres (0.12 ha)
- Built: 1924
- Built by: Stevens, H. L., Company
- Architectural style: Colonial Revival, Georgian Revival
- NRHP reference No.: 83001257
- Added to NRHP: July 28, 1983

The Burritt Hotel was a historic hotel at 67 West Main Street in New Britain, Connecticut, United States. Built in the 1920s to attract business travelers, it was the city's most luxurious hotel. It is now Burritt House, an affordable housing complex. The building was listed on the National Register of Historic Places in 1983.

== Description and history ==
The former Burritt Hotel building occupies a prominent corner location in downtown New Britain, at the northeast corner of West Main and Washington Streets. It is a six-story erection, built with a steel frame and exterior clad in brick with cast concrete trim. It is roughly U-shaped, the left leg angled to account for the non-square street corner. It has Colonial Georgian Revival styling, and its main facade faces West Main Street. That facade is nine bays wide, divided into three subgroups by the slight projection of the center five bays. The ground floor houses commercial storefronts, with the main entrance at the center. The second floor has seven three-part picture windows, and is topped by a stone stringcourse. There are balustrade-like decorations above the stringcourse and below the third-floor windows. On the third level, the windows of the outer bays are topped by half-round blind arch panels, and those on the inner bays splayed lintels with keystones. The upper floors of the inner five bays have pilasters flanking each of the outermost bays. On the interior, the central lobby and public corridor have retained their original finishes; the rest of the building has been renovated for apartment conversion.

The hotel was designed and built in 1924 by H.L. Stevens Company of New York City, a contractor specializing in hotel construction. It was built for a consortium of local business owners, who believed that a high quality hotel would improve business prospects. The building is stylistically similar to a number of other hotels the Stevens Company erected in several northeastern states. It was for many years part of the city's fashionable social scene, hosting events of all types.

== See also ==
- National Register of Historic Places listings in Hartford County, Connecticut
