= Charles Kent House =

Historic house in Ohio, United States

- U.S. National Register of Historic Places
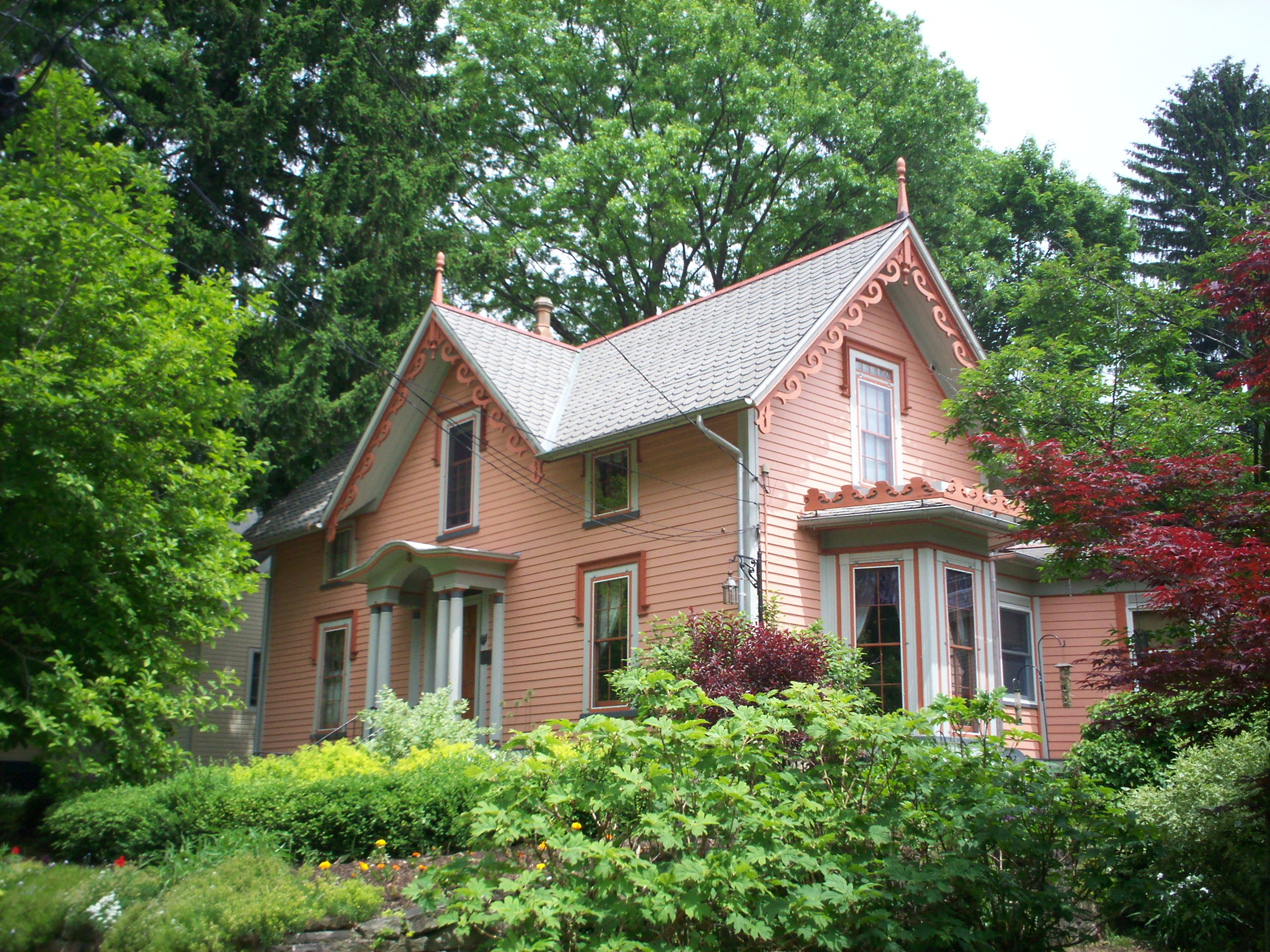
- Charles Kent House in 2009

- Location within Ohio Location within the United States
- Location: 125 North Pearl Street; Kent, Ohio
- Coordinates: 41°9′16″N 81°21′55″W
- Built: 1843
- Architect: James Clark
- Architectural style: Gothic Revival; Greek Revival; Carpenter Gothic
- NRHP reference No.: 78002174
- Added to NRHP: February 23, 1978

The Charles Kent House, also known as the Palmer House, is a historic structure in Kent, Ohio, United States. It has been listed on the National Register of Historic Places since February 23, 1978. An example of Gothic Revival architecture, the house also features elements of the Greek Revival and Carpenter Gothic architectural styles. It is at 125 North Pearl Street in central Kent, immediately north of the West Main Street District. It was built in 1843 as the home of Charles Kent, son of Zenas Kent and brother of Marvin Kent, the namesake of the city of Kent. In 1909 it was moved by owner Henry Green 150 feet (46 m) north of its original location along West Main Street to the site on North Pearl Street. Martin L. Davey, who would later serve as mayor of Kent, followed by U.S. Representative, and eventually as Governor of Ohio, persuaded the owner to move the house to avoid demolition. Owned for many years by Dr. Maurice and Louisa Palmer, it also was known as Palmer House when it was listed on the National Register. It was painted white with blue shutters. The present color scheme was changed following its sale by the Palmer estate in the early 2000s.

== See also ==
- History of Kent, Ohio
- National Register of Historic Places listings in Portage County, Ohio
