= Aaron Ferrey House =

Historic house in Ohio, United States

- U.S. National Register of Historic Places
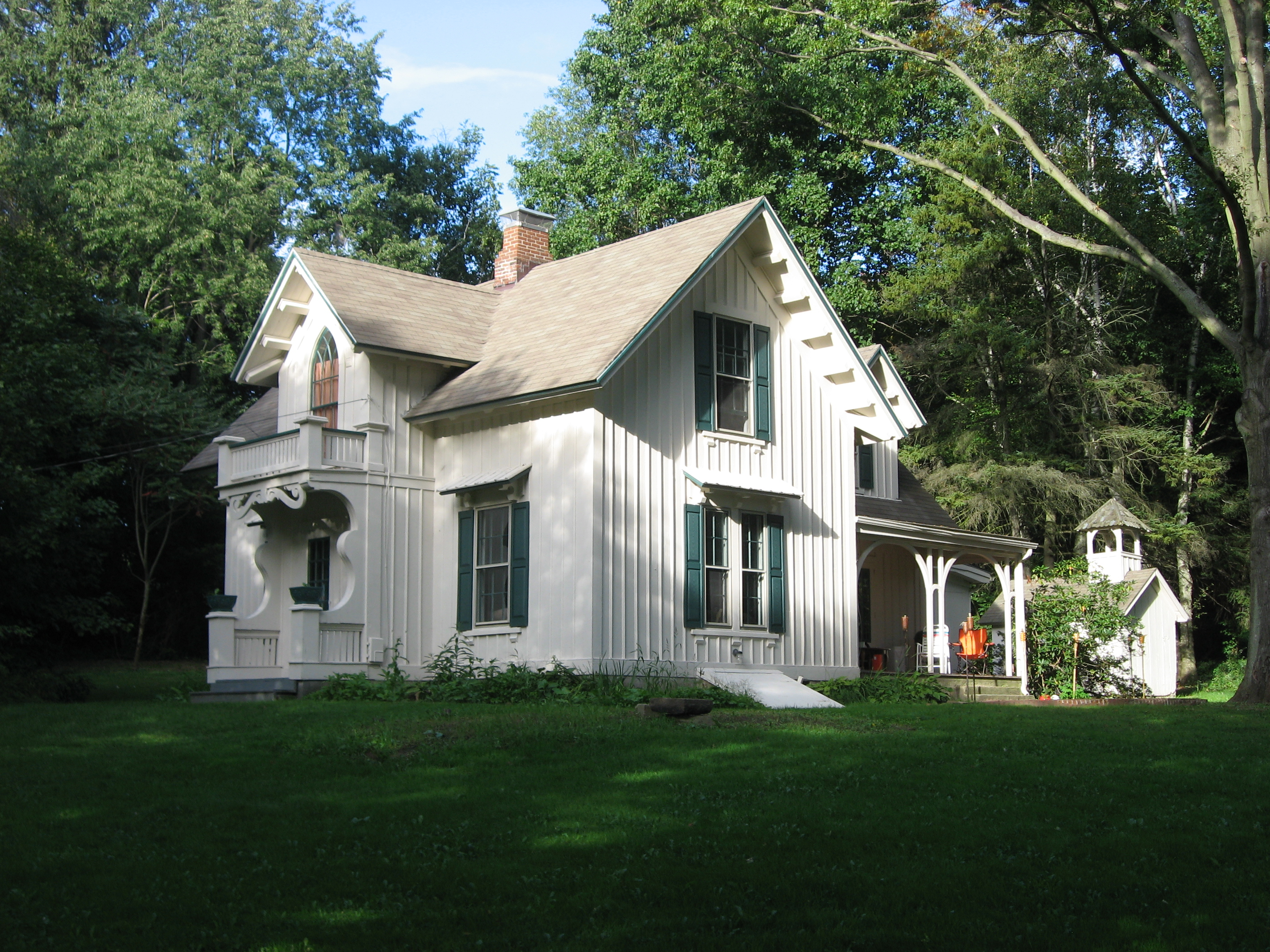
- Aaron Ferrey House in 2009

- Location within Ohio Location within the United States
- Location: 5058 Sunnybrook Road; Kent, Ohio
- Coordinates: 41°7′38″N 81°21′55″W
- Built: 1866
- Architectural style: Carpenter Gothic
- NRHP reference No.: 74001605
- Added to NRHP: May 29, 1975

The Aaron Ferrey House, also known as the Winan Snyder House, was a historic structure located at 5058 Sunnybrook Road in the southern part of Kent, Ohio, United States. It was listed on the National Register of Historic Places on August 13, 1974. The house was an example of Carpenter Gothic architecture and a rare complete use of a design by early 19th century landscape designer and Gothic Revival advocate Andrew Jackson Downing. The design was a nearly-exact replica of Design III in Downing's 1850 book, The Architecture of Country Houses, with an upper porch included instead of an extra room. It was named for Aaron Ferrey, a New England brick manufacturer who brought his business to the Franklin Mils area (later renamed Kent) in 1842, before settling in the area himself in 1846. After living and running his sizable operation in Kent for 20 years, Ferrey constructed the house in 1866, also maintaining a brickyard on the property until 1880.

It was demolished in 2017 for unknown reasons, after standing for over 150 years.

== See also ==
- History of Kent, Ohio
- National Register of Historic Places listings in Portage County, Ohio
