= National Register of Historic Places listings in Portage County, Ohio =

Location of Portage County in Ohio

This is a list of the National Register of Historic Places listings in Portage County, Ohio.

This is intended to be a complete list of the properties and districts on the National Register of Historic Places in Portage County, Ohio, United States. The locations of National Register properties and districts for which the latitude and longitude coordinates are included below, may be seen in an online map.

There are 50 properties and districts listed on the National Register in the county, including 1 National Historic Landmark. Another 2 properties were once listed but have been removed.

This National Park Service list is complete through NPS recent listings posted February 27, 2026.

== Current listings ==
	Name on the Register	Image	Date listed	Location	City or town	Description
1	Atwater Congregational Church	Atwater Congregational Church	February 23, 1973 (#73001517)	1237 State Route 183 at Atwater; 41°01′21″N 81°08′12″W	Atwater Township	
2	Aurora Center Historic District	Aurora Center Historic District	June 20, 1974 (#74001601)	Roughly both sides of State Route 306 from and including Pioneer Trail to State Route 82, also Maple Lane; 41°18′49″N 81°20′50″W	Aurora	
3	Aurora Train Station	Aurora Train Station	May 22, 1986 (#86001131)	13 New Hudson Rd. 41°19′01″N 81°20′00″W	Aurora	
4	Horace Y. Beebe House	Horace Y. Beebe House	June 16, 1983 (#83002022)	6538 Cleveland Rd., northwest of Ravenna; 41°10′07″N 81°15′19″W	Ravenna Township	Destroyed in 2020.
5	John F. Byers House	John F. Byers House	July 2, 2008 (#08000590)	5551 S. Prospect St., south of Ravenna; 41°08′31″N 81°14′33″W	Ravenna Township	
6	Cleveland Worsted Mills Redfern Mill	Cleveland Worsted Mills Redfern Mill	December 29, 1988 (#88003065)	S. Chestnut St. 41°08′58″N 81°14′37″W	Ravenna	Demolished in 2021
7	Cottage Hill Farm	Cottage Hill Farm	May 6, 1993 (#93000401)	5555 Newton Falls Rd., east of Ravenna; 41°09′54″N 81°11′45″W	Ravenna Township	
8	William H. Crafts House	William H. Crafts House	April 29, 1982 (#82003634)	4619 W. Prospect St. 41°16′56″N 81°13′33″W	Mantua	
9	Crystal Lake Stock Farm	Crystal Lake Stock Farm	April 10, 1986 (#86000698)	4655 Hayes Rd., southeast of Ravenna; 41°08′15″N 81°13′35″W	Ravenna Township	
10	John Davey House	John Davey House	May 29, 1975 (#75001524)	338 Woodard St. 41°09′31″N 81°21′55″W	Kent	
11	John Diver House and Storebuilding	John Diver House and Storebuilding	September 16, 1982 (#82003632)	9465 Akron-Canfield Rd. at Deerfield; 41°01′29″N 81°02′59″W	Deerfield Township	No longer extant.
12	East Main Street Historic District	East Main Street Historic District	October 10, 1985 (#85003123)	E. Main St. between Clinton and Linden Sts. 41°09′26″N 81°14′03″W	Ravenna	
13	Ellenwood House	Ellenwood House	June 20, 1975 (#75001523)	Northwest of Garrettsville on State Route 82; 41°17′32″N 81°06′46″W	Hiram Township	
14	Etna House	Etna House	July 25, 1985 (#85001641)	219½ W. Main St. 41°09′26″N 81°14′38″W	Ravenna	
15	Aaron Ferrey House	Aaron Ferrey House	August 13, 1974 (#74001605)	5058 Sunnybrook Rd. 41°07′38″N 81°21′55″W	Kent	
16	Franklin Hotel	Franklin Hotel	January 18, 2013 (#12000802)	176 E. Main St. 41°09′12″N 81°21′24″W	Kent	
17	Franklin Township Hall	Franklin Township Hall	October 10, 1975 (#75001525)	218 Gougler Ave. 41°09′19″N 81°21′38″W	Kent	
18	Freedom Congregational Church	Freedom Congregational Church	July 7, 1975 (#75001521)	Public Green on State Route 88 at Freedom; 41°14′07″N 81°08′50″W	Freedom Township	
19	James A. Garfield House	James A. Garfield House	January 30, 1975 (#09000098)	6825 Hinsdale St. 41°18′47″N 81°08′41″W	Hiram	
20	A.B. Griffin-O.H. Griffin House	A.B. Griffin-O.H. Griffin House	March 7, 1985 (#85000485)	409 S. Walnut St. 41°09′16″N 81°14′25″W	Ravenna	
21	Alexander B. Griffin House	Alexander B. Griffin House	July 2, 1987 (#87000987)	417 S. Walnut St. 41°09′16″N 81°14′23″W	Ravenna	
22	L.N. Gross Company Building	L.N. Gross Company Building	September 2, 2016 (#16000598)	315 Gougler Ave. 41°09′23″N 81°21′36″W	Kent	
23	Horace L. Hine House	Horace L. Hine House	December 12, 1976 (#76001513)	4624 W. Prospect St. 41°16′54″N 81°13′32″W	Mantua	
24	Benjamin F. Hopkins Stone Building	Benjamin F. Hopkins Stone Building	November 25, 1982 (#82003633)	Standing Rock Cemetery; 41°09′55″N 81°21′11″W	Kent	Dismantled
25	C.R. Howard House	C.R. Howard House	August 13, 1974 (#74001602)	411 E. Garfield St. 41°19′04″N 81°19′51″W	Aurora	
26	John Johnson Farm	John Johnson Farm	December 12, 1976 (#76001512)	6203 Pioneer Trail, southwest of Hiram; 41°17′48″N 81°10′05″W	Hiram Township	
27	Kent Industrial District	Kent Industrial District	December 30, 1974 (#74001603)	Roughly bounded by West Main and River Streets, Haymaker Parkway, and Franklin Avenue; 41°09′11″N 81°21′37″W	Kent	
28	Kent Jail	Kent Jail	August 22, 2001 (#01000895)	947 Middlebury Rd. 41°09′00″N 81°22′07″W	Kent	Listed in 1978 at 124 W. Day St., but removed in 2000 before relisting at current location in 2001
29	Charles Kent House	Charles Kent House	February 23, 1978 (#78002174)	125 N. Pearl St. 41°09′15″N 81°21′56″W	Kent	
30	Zeno Kent House	Zeno Kent House	April 23, 1973 (#73001518)	2.5 mi (4.0 km) southwest of central Aurora on Aurora-Hudson Rd. 41°17′04″N 81°21′48″W	Aurora	Demolished
31	Kent State Shootings Site	Kent State Shootings Site	February 23, 2010 (#10000046)	0.5 miles (0.80 km) southeast of the intersection of E. Main St. and S. Lincoln St. 41°09′00″N 81°20′40″W	Kent	Site of May 4, 1970, shootings of Vietnam War protesters by Ohio National Guardsmen that killed four.
32	Kentway Apartments Historic District		January 14, 2026 (#100012547)	360 E Summit Street; 41°09′00″N 81°21′11″W	Kent	
33	Mantua Center District	Mantua Center District	October 9, 1974 (#74001607)	Roughly bounded by State Route 82 and Mantua Center Rd., in Mantua Center; also 4103-3991 State Route 82, 11670-11755 Mantua Center Road, 11653- 11677 Diagonal Road, 11701-11715 School Lane; 41°18′35″N 81°14′42″W	Mantua Township	Second set of addresses represent a boundary increase approved November 28, 2023.
34	Mantua Center School	Mantua Center School	September 4, 2013 (#13000682)	11741 Mantua Center Rd. at Mantua Center; 41°18′41″N 81°14′42″W	Mantua Township	
35	Mantua Station Brick Commercial District	Mantua Station Brick Commercial District	December 24, 1974 (#74001606)	Main and Prospect Sts. 41°16′54″N 81°13′26″W	Mantua	
36	Masonic Temple	Masonic Temple	July 18, 1974 (#74001604)	409 W. Main St. 41°09′15″N 81°21′47″W	Kent	
37	Mott Drug Store	Mott Drug Store	February 29, 1996 (#96000221)	8107 Main St. 41°17′05″N 81°05′52″W	Garrettsville	
38	Luman Nelson House	Luman Nelson House	December 22, 1993 (#93001393)	8219 State Route 44, north of Ravenna; 41°12′53″N 81°14′33″W	Shalersville Township	
39	Ohio State Normal College at Kent	Ohio State Normal College at Kent	May 30, 1975 (#75001526)	Hilltop Dr. on the Kent State University campus 41°09′06″N 81°20′53″W	Kent	
40	Arvin Olin House	Arvin Olin House	October 20, 1995 (#95001157)	1423 Ravenna Rd., north of Kent; 41°11′02″N 81°20′33″W	Franklin Township	Demolished by the city of Akron on 10 March 2010
41	Palmyra Center Hotel	Palmyra Center Hotel	April 30, 1976 (#76001514)	County Road 18 and State Route 225 at Palmyra Center; 41°05′57″N 81°03′07″W	Palmyra Township	
42	Phoenix Block	Phoenix Block	March 18, 1985 (#85000624)	Northeastern corner of Main and Chestnut Sts. 41°09′28″N 81°14′37″W	Ravenna	
43	C.A. Reed House	C.A. Reed House	October 10, 1985 (#85003116)	229 W. Riddle St. 41°09′18″N 81°14′41″W	Ravenna	
44	Riddle Block	Riddle Block	March 17, 1976 (#76001515)	Public Sq., Chestnut, and Main Sts. 41°09′26″N 81°14′35″W	Ravenna	
45	Riddle Block No. 5	Riddle Block No. 5	July 25, 1985 (#85001642)	141-145 E. Main St. 41°09′28″N 81°14′30″W	Ravenna	
46	Riddle Block No. 9	Riddle Block No. 9	March 18, 1985 (#85000625)	113-115 W. Main St. 41°09′28″N 81°14′37″W	Ravenna	
47	Riddle Block No. 11	Riddle Block No. 11	March 18, 1985 (#85000626)	133-137 E. Main St. 41°09′28″N 81°14′32″W	Ravenna	
48	Frederick Wadsworth House	Frederick Wadsworth House	May 29, 1975 (#75001520)	4889 State Route 14, northwest of Edinburg; 41°07′21″N 81°10′48″W	Edinburg Township	
49	West Main Street District	West Main Street District	June 17, 1977 (#77001082)	409-625 W. Main St. 41°09′14″N 81°21′56″W	Kent	
50	Thomas F. Young House	Thomas F. Young House	October 22, 1976 (#76001511)	Wakefield and Garfield Sts. 41°18′35″N 81°08′40″W	Hiram	

== Former listings ==
	Name on the Register	Image	Date listed	Date removed	Location	City or town	Description
1	Brown-Kent Tannery		October 2, 1973 (#73002290)	September 30, 1976	Stow St.	Kent	Demolished on June 2, 1976.
2	Cascade House		July 1, 1975 (#75001522)	Unknown	Northeast of Garrettsville on State Route 282 in Nelson Ledge State Park	Garrettsville	Demolished in 1980.

== See also ==
- List of National Historic Landmarks in Ohio
- Listings in neighboring counties: Cuyahoga, Geauga, Mahoning, Stark, Summit, Trumbull
- National Register of Historic Places listings in Ohio
