= Kent station (Erie Railroad) =

Former station for the Erie Railroad

Kent
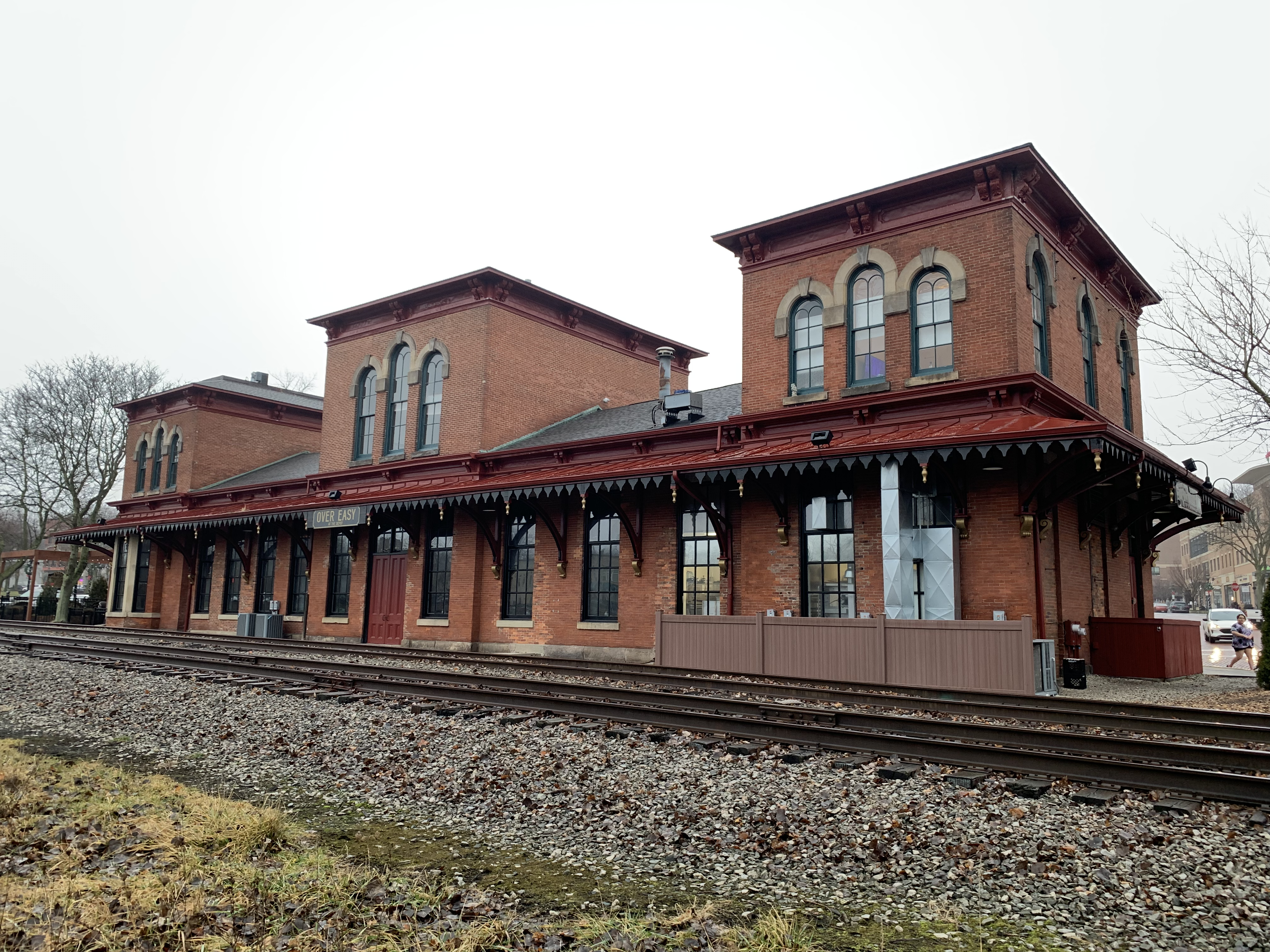
- Kent station in January 2023

General information
- Location: 152 Franklin Ave, Kent, Ohio
- Coordinates: 41°9′11″N 81°21′33″W
- Owner: Atlantic and Great Western Railroad (1864–1880 ) New York, Pennsylvania and Ohio Railroad (1880–1905) Erie Railroad (1905–1960) Erie Lackawanna Railroad (1960–1975) Kent Historical Society (1975–present)
- Line: Main Line (Kent Division)
- Platforms: 2 side platforms
- Tracks: 2

Other information
- Station code: 5711

History
- Opened: June 1, 1875; 151 years ago (depot)
- Closed: January 4, 1970; 56 years ago
- Rebuilt: 1981
- Electrified: Not electrified

Former services
Preceding station	Erie Railroad	Following station
Tallmadge toward Chicago	Main Line	Ravenna toward Jersey City
Location

Kent is a former station for the Erie Railroad in Kent, Ohio, on the Erie main line (Kent Division) between Chicago and Jersey City. Along the main line, the next station west towards Chicago’s Dearborn Station was Tallmadge, while east towards Jersey City’s Pavonia Terminal was Ravenna. The station was located 615.9 miles (991.2 km) from Pavonia Terminal and 382.6 miles (615.7 km) from Dearborn Station. The city of Kent was the headquarters of the Kent Division, with car shops and a large yard maintained just south of the station until 1930. About one mile (1.6 km) north of the station were the Erie Railroad's Breakneck Yards, which operated into the 1960s.

The station, located in Kent's downtown area overlooking the Cuyahoga River, dates to 1864, one year after the opening of the Atlantic and Great Western Railroad through Kent in 1863, while the depot, described as being in the Tuscan Revival style, opened in 1875. Kent station consisted of two platform extending along the outside of each of the two tracks south from West Main Street to Stow Street. The depot was toward the northern end of the platforms on Franklin Avenue.

Kent station closed in 1970 and the depot was nearly demolished in the 1970s. Its potential demise was one of the main catalysts in establishing the Kent Historical Society in 1971, who purchased the depot in 1975 and later restored and renovated it for use as a restaurant and office space.

== History ==
The depot opened on June 1, 1875. It was built by the Atlantic and Great Western Railroad. The railroad was originally chartered as the Franklin & Warren Railroad by local businessman Marvin Kent and first entered Franklin Mills in 1853. He maintained control over the A&GW which was headquartered in the town, and through his influence, passenger and freight and car shops and a large yard were also based in the town, opening in 1865. As a result of Kent's efforts, the post office was renamed Kent in 1864, and the town incorporated as the village of Kent in 1867.

The A&GW had used two other depots prior to the building of the 1875 depot. When the railroad first reached Kent, it used a boxcar as a temporary depot. A small frame building was built and used to replace the first depot, but a need for more substantial building was identified. The railroad was only committed to providing around 60 percent of the estimated cost of the new depot, but a community groundswell of support for the depot was sufficient that it pledged the balance needed to complete the depot in a single meeting.

After a series of bankruptcies and reorganizations, the A&GW fell into the hands of the Erie Railroad, and on June 16, 1883, the Erie ran its first train from the New York area through Kent into Chicago’s Dearborn Street Station. Kent continued to be a major stop on Erie's New York–Chicago trains throughout the first half of the twentieth century. Service continued through 1960 when the Erie merged with the Delaware, Lackawanna and Western Railroad to form the Erie Lackawanna Railway. Passenger service ended on January 4, 1970, with the final passing of the Lake Cities.

== Description ==
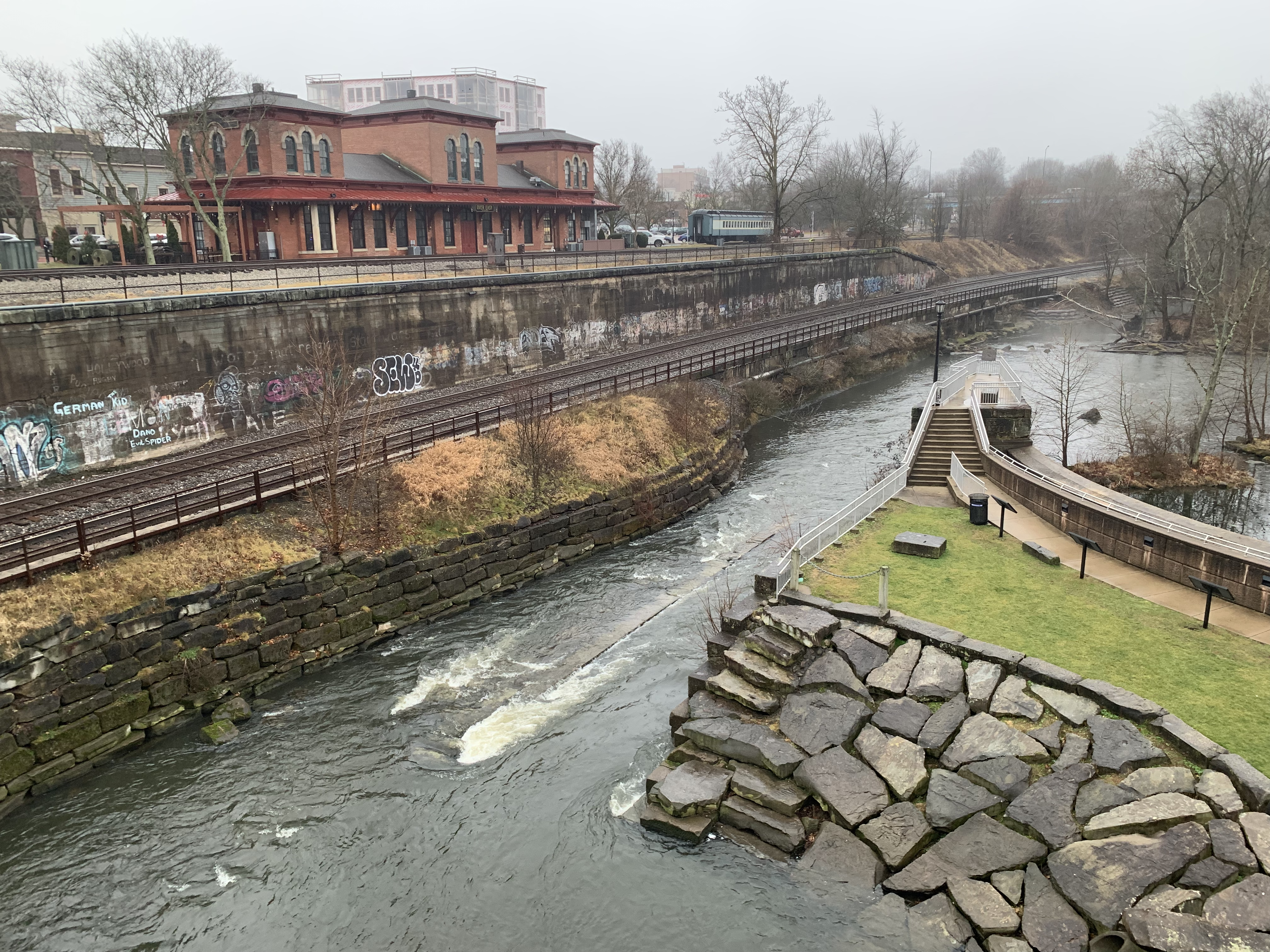
Depot, the lower B&O tracks and the Cuyahoga River as viewed from Main Street

Author Janet Greenstein Potter has described the depot as being built in a Tuscan Revival style. It is constructed of red brick with a slate roof. The overall design of the depot is perfectly symmetrical with three double-story towers connected by two single-story portions. The windows on the second floor of each tower are grouped in threes and are stone-arched. A canopy extends entirely around the building with spaced pendants extending down along the canopy. On the first floor the depot building has a ticket and telegraph office, baggage and express rooms, and separate waiting rooms for men and women. There is a single-door entrance to the depot on Franklin Avenue, and another entrance on the track side comprising large double doors that lead to an elegant restaurant. On the second floor were living quarters for the depot manager, as well as bunk space for the railroad workers and a "Reading Room" for the workers. Besides the depot, the station also included a wooden freight house just to the south of the depot. Further south of the station, the complex included a large rail yard and shops for building and repairing coaches and freight cars.

== Closure ==
During the later years of the Erie Railroad and the Erie Lackawanna, Kent station was served by several trains daily, including the Atlantic Express and Pacific Express, Erie Limited, Phoebe Snow and Lake Cities which ran between Dearborn Station in Chicago and Erie’s Pavonia Terminal in Jersey City or Lackawanna's Hoboken Terminal in Hoboken, New Jersey. In the late 1960s, the Erie Lackawanna was cutting several long distance trains from its schedule, including the Phoebe Snow in November 1966. By June 1969, the Erie Lackawanna had applied to the Interstate Commerce Commission to discontinue service of the Lake Cities, citing that is not worth the money being expedited combined with the railroad's financial status. On December 25, 1969 (Christmas Day), the ICC approved it, and the Erie Lackawanna promised to keep it running through the holiday season, with the last trains to run on January 4, 1970 out of Hoboken Terminal. On the evening of January 4, 1970, the last Lake Cities left Hoboken Terminal, guided by locomotive No. 826, marking the final Erie through passenger train passing through Kent.

At that point the depot was abandoned and boarded up. Its potential demolition in the early 1970s was one of the first major projects of the Kent Historical Society, formed in 1971, which purchased the building in 1975 and renovated it, occupying the second floor along with the Kent Chamber of Commerce until 2006. Just prior to purchasing the building, the Kent Industrial District historic district was formed which included the depot, and it was listed on the National Register of Historic Places on December 30, 1974. In 1981, the Pufferbelly Restaurant moved into the lower floor of the old depot, and operated until December 31, 2016. After a renovation and restoration of the building for much of 2017, an Italian restaurant Treno opened in September 2017, but closed in 2020 during the Covid pandemic. Since late December 2021, the depot's main level restaurant space has been occupied by the cafe Over Easy at the Depot.

== Other Kent stations ==
The Erie station was one of three railroad stations in Kent. In addition to the Erie Railroad, the Baltimore and Ohio Railroad (B&O) operated a Kent station until 1971 and the Wheeling and Lake Erie Railway (W&LE) until 1938. Both of those stations were located less than one mile from the Erie station, though neither were as large or prominent as the Erie station. As of 2023, the passenger depots for the B&O and W&LE stations still stand, though both are vacant and the W&LE depot has been moved across the street and tracks from its original location.

=== Baltimore & Ohio Railroad ===
Through downtown Kent, the B&O tracks are just west of the Erie tracks, between the Erie rails and the Cuyahoga River on a lower level closer to the river. The B&O line was originally built in the 1880s by the Pittsburgh and Western Railroad after the Erie line had been established, and is known to locals as the "lower tracks". Kent's first B&O station was a box car located adjacent to the south side of the Main Street Bridge just below the Erie depot. This depot was accessible from the bridge using a staircase and a luggage ramp. In 1905, as part of a larger project to double-track the line, the B&O opened a new station a short distance to the south at Summit Street. This station consisted of a makeshift platform along the lower tracks extending northward from Summit Street and a small wood-frame building with a ticket window near the south end. On the south side of the street was the accompanying freight depot. B&O trains traveling between Chicago's Grand Central Station and Pittsburgh's P&LE Station could stop at Kent, but the stop was a flag stop only available on certain trains. Passenger service to this station ended April 30, 1971. The passenger depot, owned by B&O successor CSX Transportation, still exists as of 2023, though it was damaged by fire in 2013. Its accompanying freight depot was razed in 2010.

=== Wheeling and Lake Erie Railway ===
The W&LE line was built in 1880 through what was then the western edge of Kent. The station, located on West Main Street, 0.72 miles (1.16 km) west of the Erie depot, opened in 1881 and originally included a passenger depot at West Main Street and a freight depot a short distance to the south closer to Stow Street. The W&LE offered passenger service from Kent on the route between Wheeling, West Virginia, and Cleveland until July 17, 1938. After the W&LE ceased using the station, it was used for several different purposes, including a feed store until 2013. The site was purchased by Carter Lumber in 2012, who wished to expand their adjacent yard. To prevent the building from being razed, it was moved to the north side of West Main and the west side of the W&LE tracks in July 2014. As of 2023, the building still stands, though it is on the temporary foundation created for it in 2014.

== Bibliography ==
- Dzeba, Bruce (2011). Railroad Town: Kent and the Erie Railroad. Kent, Ohio: Kent Historical Society Press. ISBN 9781607251774.
- Camp, Mark (2007). Images of Rail: Railroad Depots of Northeast Ohio. Charleston, South Carolina: Arcadia Publishing. ISBN 9780738551159.
- Taber, Thomas Townsend; Taber, Thomas Townsend III (1980). The Delaware, Lackawanna & Western Railroad in the Twentieth Century. Vol. 1. Muncy, PA: Privately printed. ISBN 0-9603398-2-5.
- Yanosey, Robert (2007). Erie Railroad Facilities (In Color). Vol. 3. Scotch Plains, New Jersey: Morning Sun Books Inc. ISBN 978-1582482088.
