= Masonic Temple (Kent, Ohio) =

- U.S. National Register of Historic Places
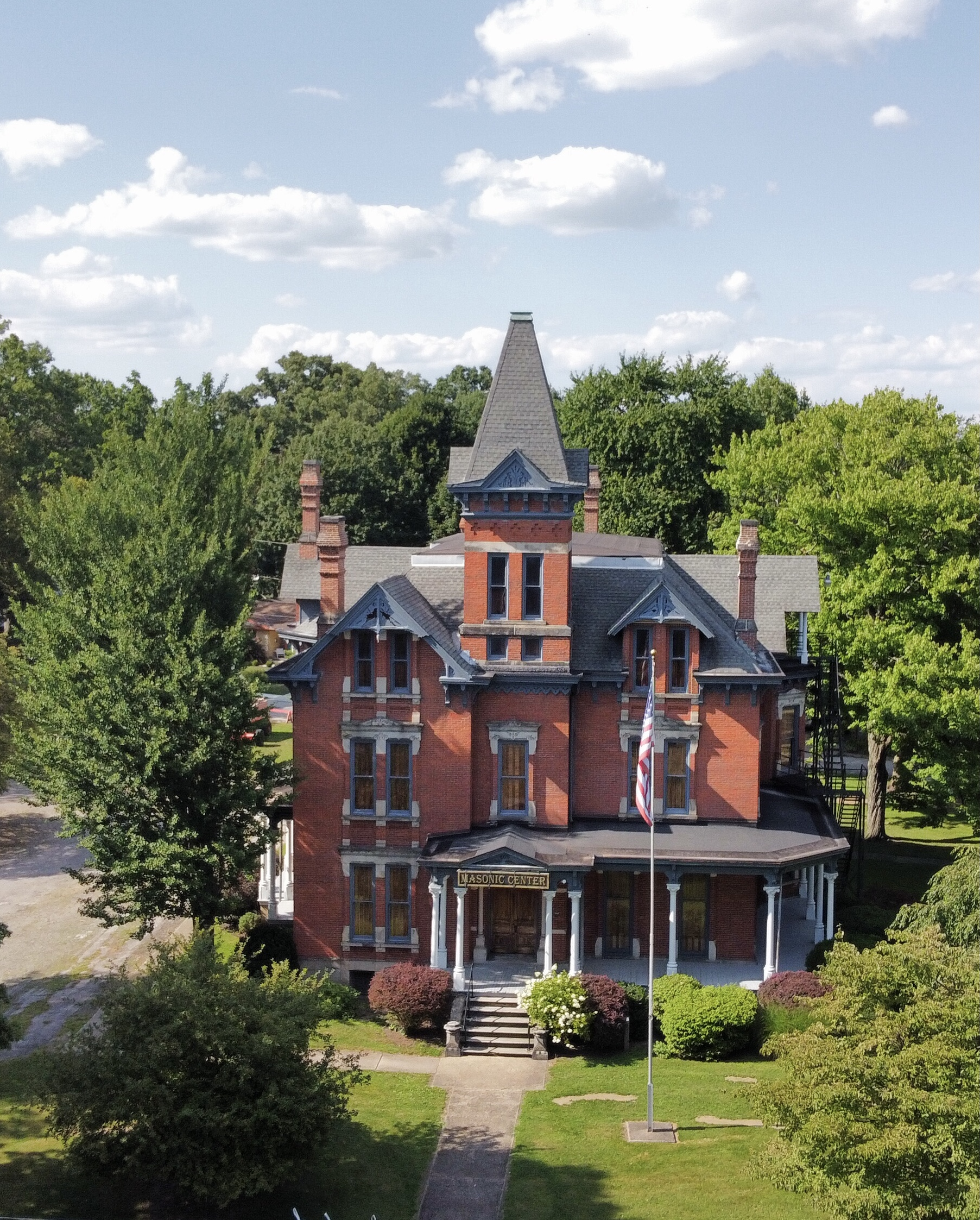
- South facade, 2022

- Location within Ohio Location within the United States
- Location: 409 West Main Street; Kent, Ohio, U.S.
- Coordinates: 41°9′15″N 81°21′47″W
- Area: 1.5 acres (0.61 ha)
- Built: 1880–1882
- Architect: Isaac D. Tuttle
- Architectural style: Italianate
- NRHP reference No.: 74001604
- Added to NRHP: July 18, 1974

The Masonic Temple in Kent, Ohio is a historic building which is listed on the National Register of Historic Places. Built between 1880 and 1882 in the Italianate style, it was originally the home of Kent namesake Marvin Kent and his family. Construction was performed partially by locals and partly by master craftsmen from afar: the architect was Isaac Tuttle of neighboring Ravenna, but interior woodworking was performed by woodworkers brought from New York City. Members of Kent's family lived at the house for slightly more than forty years before selling it to a Masonic lodge in 1923. Due to Marvin Kent's national prominence in the Republican Party, many political leaders visited his house, including Presidents Benjamin Harrison, William McKinley, William Howard Taft, and Warren G. Harding; the guest room in which every president slept has been named the "President's Room" and preserved in its late nineteenth-century condition.

Built of brick on a foundation of sandstone, the Masonic Temple features miscellaneous elements of wood and sandstone placed under a slate roof. A brick wall is placed in front of the house, which features a wrap-around porch with a small pediment. The house's walls rise two and a half stories, with a taller tower at the center of the facade; the eaves under the tall pointed roof are supported by a cornice composed of dentilling.

It was listed on the National Register in 1974 and is also a contributing structure of the West Main Street District, listed on the NRHP in 1977.

== See also ==
- History of Kent, Ohio
- National Register of Historic Places listings in Portage County, Ohio
