= Kent Industrial District =

Historic district in Ohio, United States

- U.S. National Register of Historic Places
- U.S. Historic district
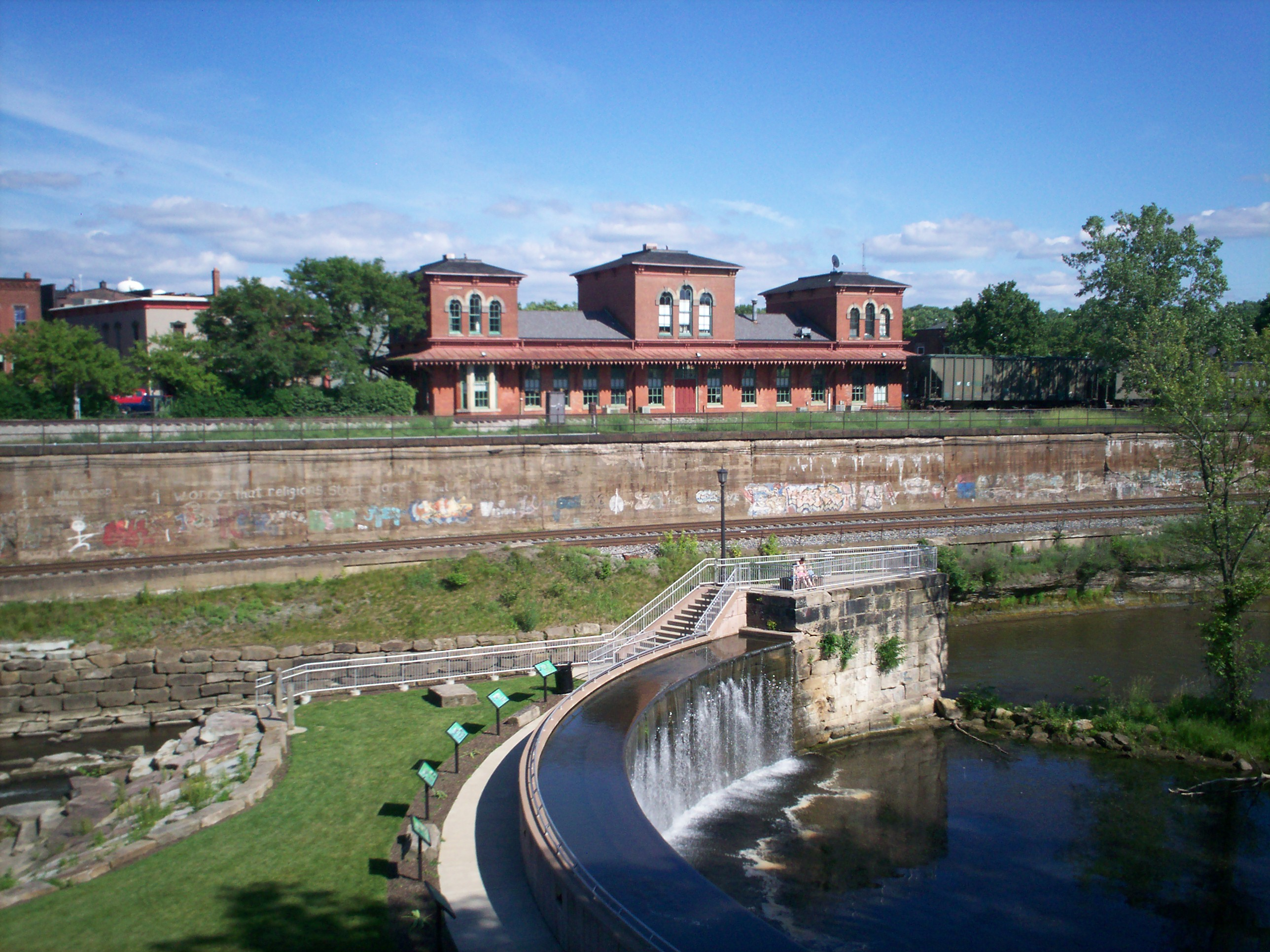
- 1875 Atlantic & Great Western Depot as seen from the Cuyahoga River

- Location within Ohio Location within the United States
- Location: Downtown Kent, Ohio
- Coordinates: 41°9′11″N 81°21′37″W
- Area: 4.3 acres (0.017 km^{2})
- Built: 1851
- Architectural style: Italian Villa
- NRHP reference No.: 74001603
- Added to NRHP: December 30, 1974

The Kent Industrial District is a historic district in Kent, Ohio, United States, listed on the National Register of Historic Places. The district covers around 4.3 acres (1.7 ha) of downtown Kent on either side of the Cuyahoga River and is roughly bounded by West Main Street on the north, River Street to the west, Franklin Avenue to the east and Haymaker Parkway to the south. Within the district are three buildings and two stone structures of historical significance. It was listed on the National Register of Historic Places in 1974. Kent namesake Marvin Kent was involved in several aspects of the district's development and the area would play a key role in the development of Kent during much of the 19th century. The earliest structures in the district date to the 1830s with the most recent historic structure, the livery and carriage shop building, dating to 1910. The area today is occupied mostly by the city of Kent's Franklin Mills Riveredge Park, Heritage Park, and various private landowners.

== History ==
=== Early development ===
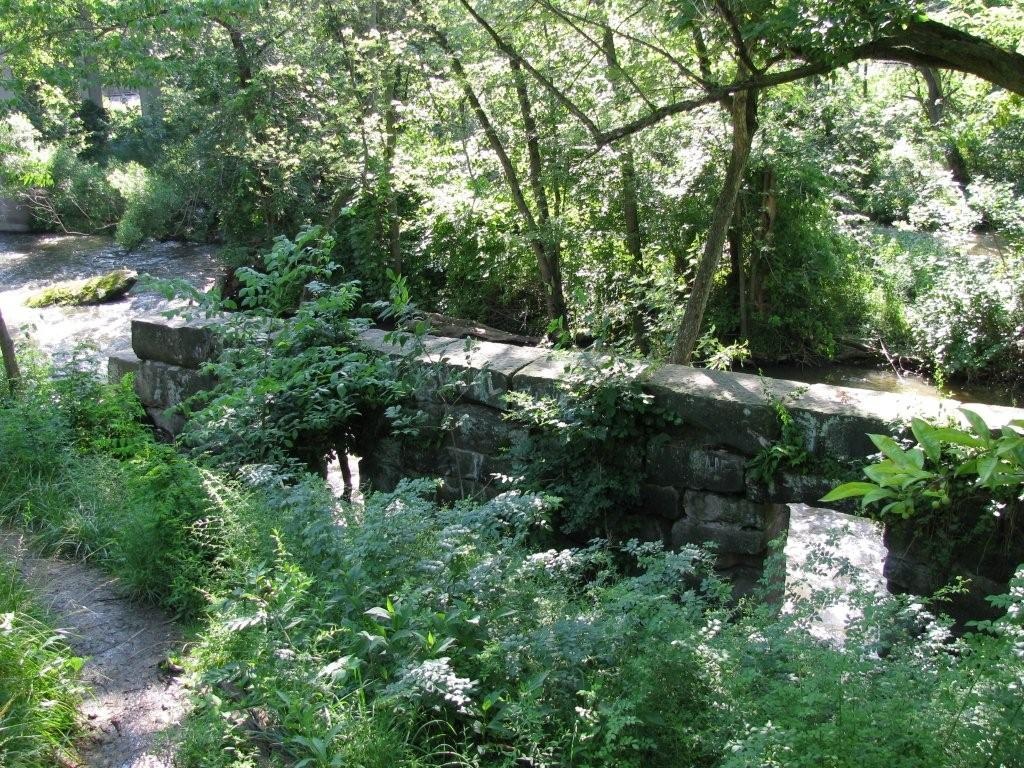
Ruins of the Kent flour mill, built in 1832.

The area that now comprises the historic district was attractive to early settlers due to potential power from the Cuyahoga River. John Haymaker, the first white settler in what is now Kent, built the first gristmill along the river just north of present-day Stow Street in 1807. Development along the river did not begin to pick up until the late 1830s with the construction of the Pennsylvania and Ohio Canal and the hopes that the village, then known as Franklin Mills, would become a center for the production of silk. These events led to rampant land speculation along the river and resulted in the construction of much of what is today downtown Kent. The Panic of 1837 and the area's unfavorable climate for silkworms ended any hopes for the village becoming a silk industrial center. It was during this time, however, that the first parts of today's historical district were constructed. As part of the canal, a 19-foot stone arch dam was constructed with an attached lock in 1836. Zenas Kent, father of Kent namesake Marvin Kent, built a flour mill in 1837 on the site of the Haymaker's first mill, just south of the current district's boundaries. He also built a tannery across the street from the mill which he operated with John Brown for a short time.

=== Alpaca Mill ===
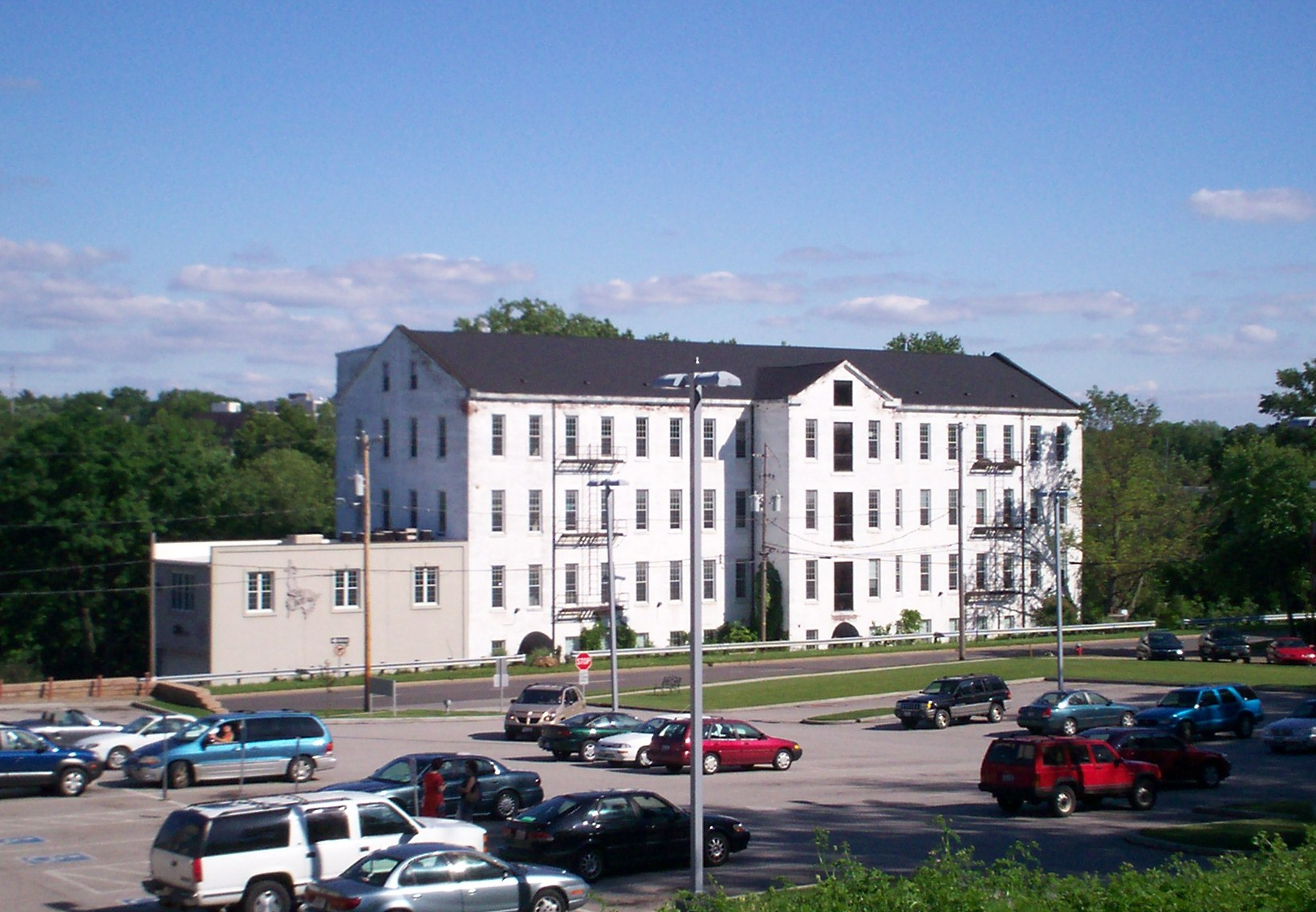
The former Alpaca Mill, known locally as the "Silk Mill" along River Street (SR 43). Today it is home of the Silk Mill Apartments.

In one of his first ventures as a businessman, Marvin Kent helped organize a group of investors to form the Franklin Mills Cotton Company in 1851. The group set out building a factory on the site of the silk mill, which had only been excavated in the 1830s before being abandoned. The exterior of the building was completed by the summer of 1852, but shortly thereafter the main investors pulled out and the company collapsed. Only the outside of the five-story building was completed while the inside remained unfinished for over twenty years. In 1878, James Turner came from Jamestown, New York, to seek a new location for an alpaca mill. After agreements were put in place with Marvin Kent, construction started on improvements to the building, which included a finished interior and a new water wheel for power. The mill opened September 4, 1879, and later included worsted goods. It would operate there for 10 years before moving to Cleveland in 1889. Later, from 1914 to 1928, the building served as a factory for the manufacturing of shirtwaists by the Cleveland-based L.N. Gross Company, operating as "The L.N. Gross Co. Shirt Waist Factory". By 1928, the factory employed 150 women and girls and the company was looking to expand. They eventually built their own building down the street.

=== Railroad and bridge ===
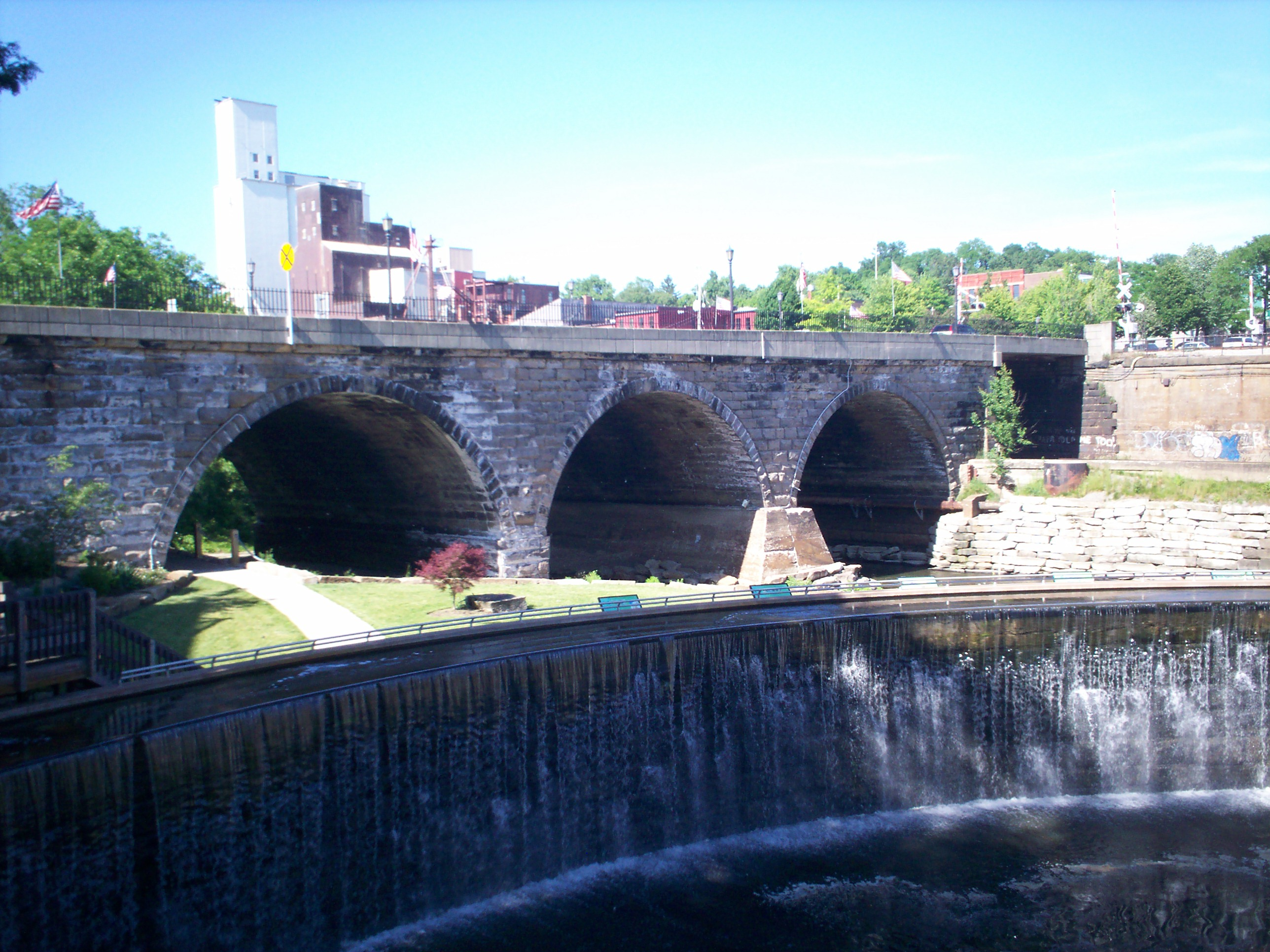
The 1836 dam with the 1877 Main Street Bridge behind. Heritage Park, dedicated in 2005, is located between the dam and bridge. Water is artificially pumped over the dam.

Another venture of Marvin Kent was the establishment of the Atlantic and Great Western Railroad and his role in having Franklin Mills selected not only as a stop on the line, but also as the location for the railroad shops. This led to construction of railroad tracks through what is now the eastern edge of the historic district beginning in 1853 and later the construction of a train station, which would open June 1, 1875. Soon after, in 1876, construction began on a replacement of the Main Street bridge, which previously had been a wooden covered bridge built in 1837. A stone arch bridge was built, which was completed in 1877. During the 1880s a second rail line was constructed through the current district by the Baltimore and Ohio Railroad, known today as the "lower tracks."

=== Later history ===
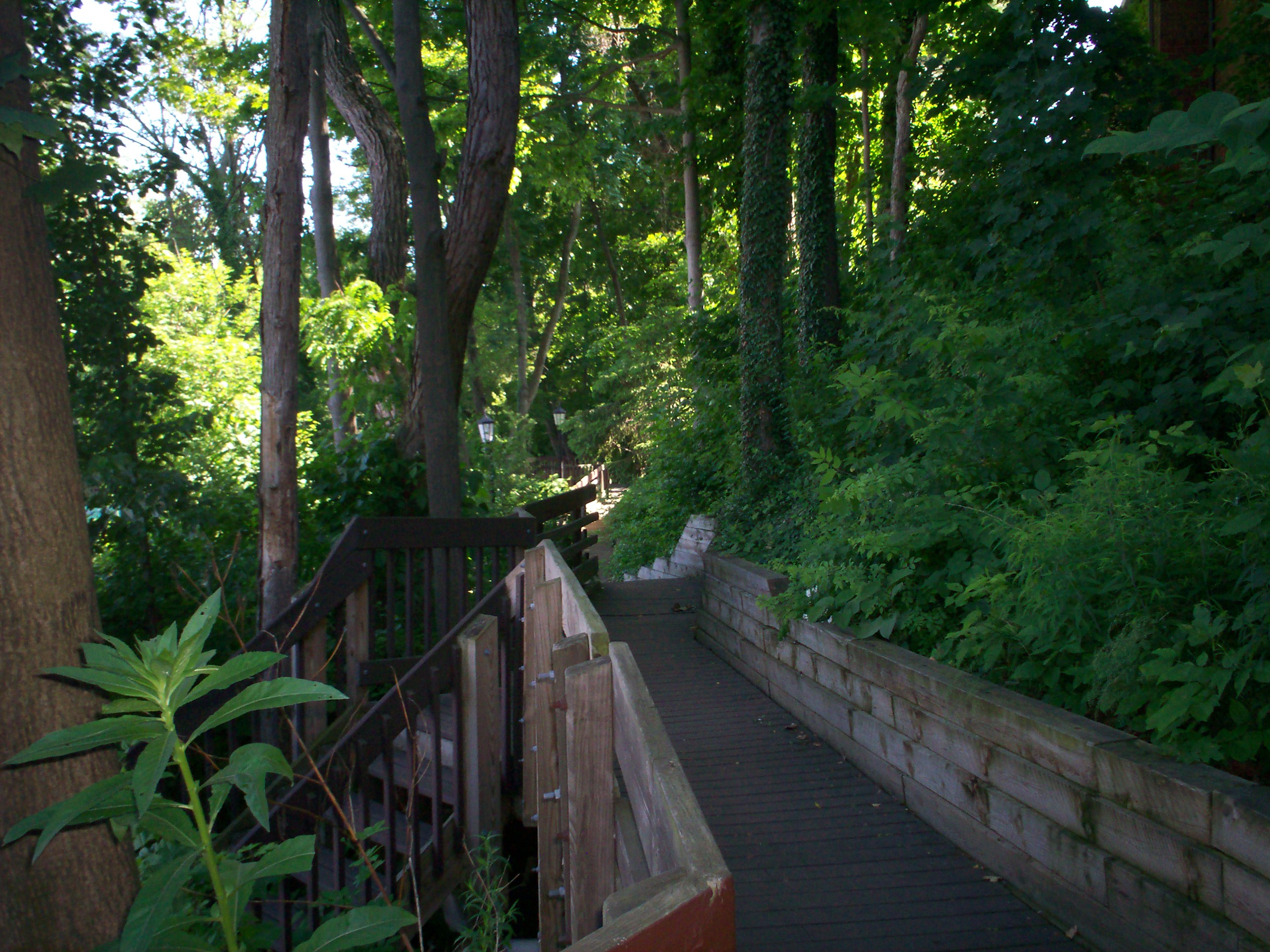
Boardwalk in Franklin Mills Riveredge Park connecting the dam to Tannery Park. The boardwalk closely follows the path of the old mill race.

After the departure of the alpaca-worsted mill in 1889, the area which now comprises the historic district slowly declined in importance. The lock and dam were heavily damaged in 1913 during a flood that affected much of Ohio. The damage was heavy enough to cause residents to debate whether or not the dam and lock should be repaired or removed. Ultimately, they were repaired in 1925 due to their historic value. The Kent flour mill and Kent tannery (also known as the John Brown tannery) fell into disuse. The mill was torn down in the 1930s while the tannery lasted until 1976 when it was torn down as part of an environmental cleanup project. Also during the 1930s, land was donated to the city to create Franklin Mills Riveredge Park, which covers much of the current historical district along with Tannery Park, which occupies the site of tannery. The park features a boardwalk along the Cuyahoga River which closely follows the path of the mill race which originally ran from the dam to the flour and alpaca mills downstream.

Around 1910, a livery and carriage shop was built at the southeast corner of West Main and River Streets. This building would later serve as an automobile dealership in the 1970s and is today home to several offices.

The Atlantic and Great Western Rail Depot, later known as the Erie Depot, continued to be used as a train depot until January 6, 1970. At that point it was abandoned and boarded up. Its potential demolition in the early 1970s was one of the first major projects of the Kent Historical Society, formed in 1971, which purchased the building in 1975 and renovated it, occupying the second floor along with the Kent Chamber of Commerce until 2006. Just prior to purchasing the building, the historic district was formed which included the depot, being listed on the National Register of Historic Places on December 30, 1974. In 1981, the Pufferbelly Restaurant moved into the lower floor of the old depot, and operated until 2017. Also during the early 1970s, Haymaker Parkway was constructed. The main bridge of the parkway, known as the Redmond Greer Memorial Bridge, essentially forms the southern boundary of the district, immediately south of the former alpaca mill.

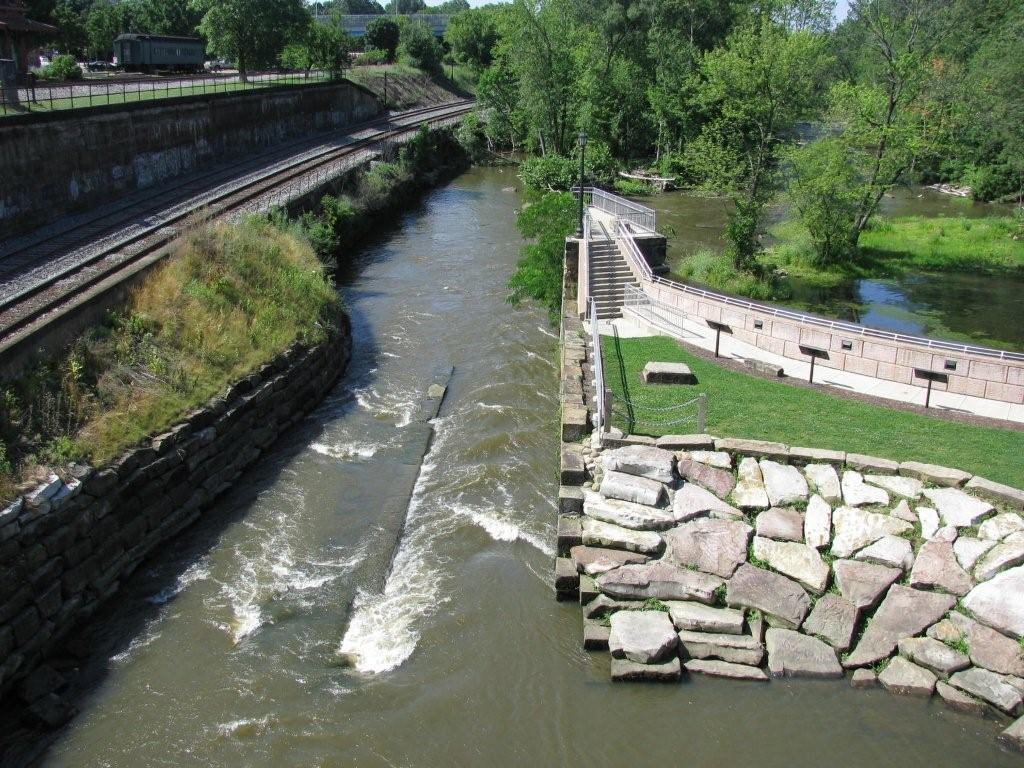
View of former canal lock, center, with Heritage Park on the right.

In 2002, the former alpaca-worsted mill, known locally as the silk mill, was purchased by a developer and renovated into several loft apartments. The building had previously been used as a warehouse. In 2004 the Ohio Environmental Protection Agency declared the Cuyahoga River water quality to be too low and recommended removal of the dam. In a compromise of environmental and historical concerns, one wall of the lock was removed and the channel was widened to allow the river to flow through it. Behind the dam, a small park known as Heritage Park was constructed which included a large pump to allow water to be pumped over the dam during warm-weather months. It was dedicated in May 2005. In 2017, Treno Ristorante officially opened in the space Pufferbelly Restaurant formerly occupied on the lower floor of the Erie Depot.

== Contributing structures ==
- Stone arch dam and canal lock, built 1836
- Alpaca-worsted mill (also known as the Silk Mill), built 1851
- Atlantic and Great Western Rail Depot (also known as the Erie Depot), built 1875
- Main Street Bridge, built 1877
- Livery and carriage shop, built ca. 1910

== See also ==
- History of Kent, Ohio
- National Register of Historic Places listings in Portage County, Ohio
