= Kent Jail =

Historic jailhouse in Kent, Ohio, US

- U.S. National Register of Historic Places
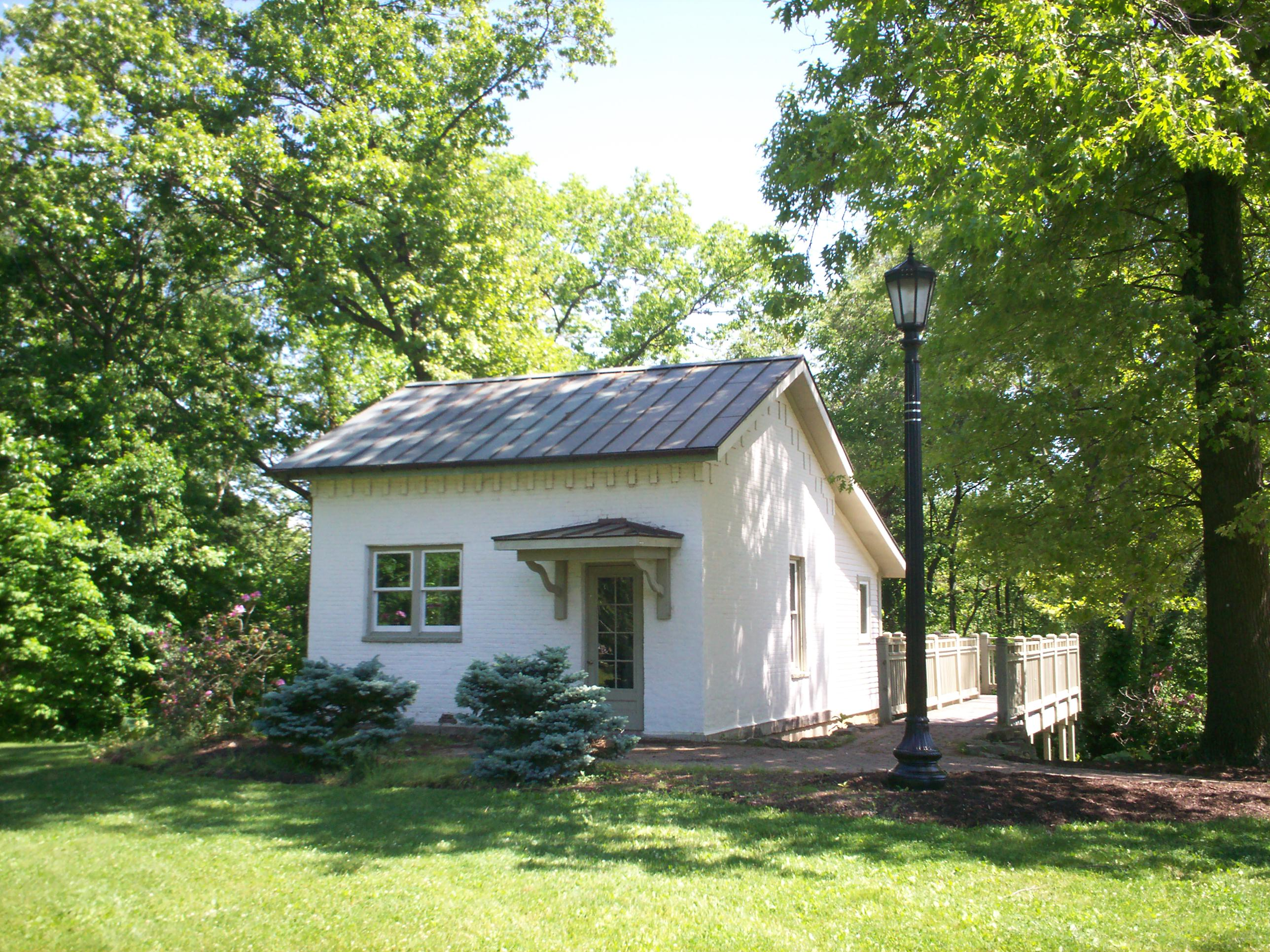
- Kent Jail 2009

- Location within Ohio Location within the United States
- Location: 947 Middlebury Road; Kent, Ohio
- Coordinates: 41°9′0″N 81°22′6″W
- Built: 1869
- Architectural style: Late Victorian
- NRHP reference No.: 01000895
- Added to NRHP: August 10, 1978; August 22, 2001

The Kent Jail, also known as the Old Jailhouse, is a historic structure located in Kent, Ohio, in the United States. It was first added to the National Register of Historic Places August 10, 1978, while still located at its original location of 124 West Day Street, near downtown Kent immediately south of Haymaker Parkway. In December 1999 the building was moved to 497 Middlebury Road to make way for a Walgreens drug store, and was subsequently delisted from the register July 20, 2000. It was re-added on August 22, 2001 after undergoing an extensive US$120,000 restoration. It is owned by and adjacent to the offices of the Kent Parks and Recreation Department and is used by the department as a rental location for small gatherings. It was originally built in 1869, just two years after Kent incorporated as a village. It is an example of late Victorian architecture and is one of three known remaining small town jail buildings in eastern Ohio. The jail was used for incarceration until the 1930s and later served as home of the city's service director and engineer until the 1940s. After a period of vacancy, it was purchased in 1950 and used as a private home by various owners until it was moved in 1999.

== See also ==
- History of Kent, Ohio
- National Register of Historic Places listings in Portage County, Ohio
