= History of Kent, Ohio =

The area now occupied by the city of Kent, Ohio, was previously inhabited by various Native American tribes until the 19th century. Though little record of any settlement exists, the area was located along several known trails. One example of Native American inhabitants in the area can be found at Towner's Woods Park where a mound is located. In 1798 it was sold to Aaron Olmsted as part of the Connecticut Western Reserve. He initially named the area "Franklin" after his son, Aaron Franklin Olmsted. The first settlers, the Haymaker family, arrived in late 1805, having been attracted to the area by the Cuyahoga River and its potential for powering gristmills.

Twin settlements developed along the river, known locally as the "upper" and "lower" villages and collectively as Franklin Mills, though the upper village was also known for a time as Carthage. In the late 1830s and early 1840s, construction of the Pennsylvania and Ohio Canal helped fuel construction of a central business area opposite the twin villages though most of the anticipated growth from the canal was never realized. Later, the village would develop as a railroad center mostly through the efforts of Marvin Kent who not only was able to get his railroad routed through the village, but was also successful in having Franklin Mills named the home of the railroads maintenance shops and yards. This ultimately led to the village being renamed Kent in 1864, an act made official in 1867 the same year Kent was formally incorporated. Other industries would follow into the 20th century.

In 1910 Kent was selected as the site of one of two normal schools in northern Ohio, which would become Kent State University. The school grew quickly, becoming a full-fledged university by 1935. Following World War II even more growth coupled with suburbanization led to growth in Kent, ultimately transforming the city into the College town it is today.

== Early history ==
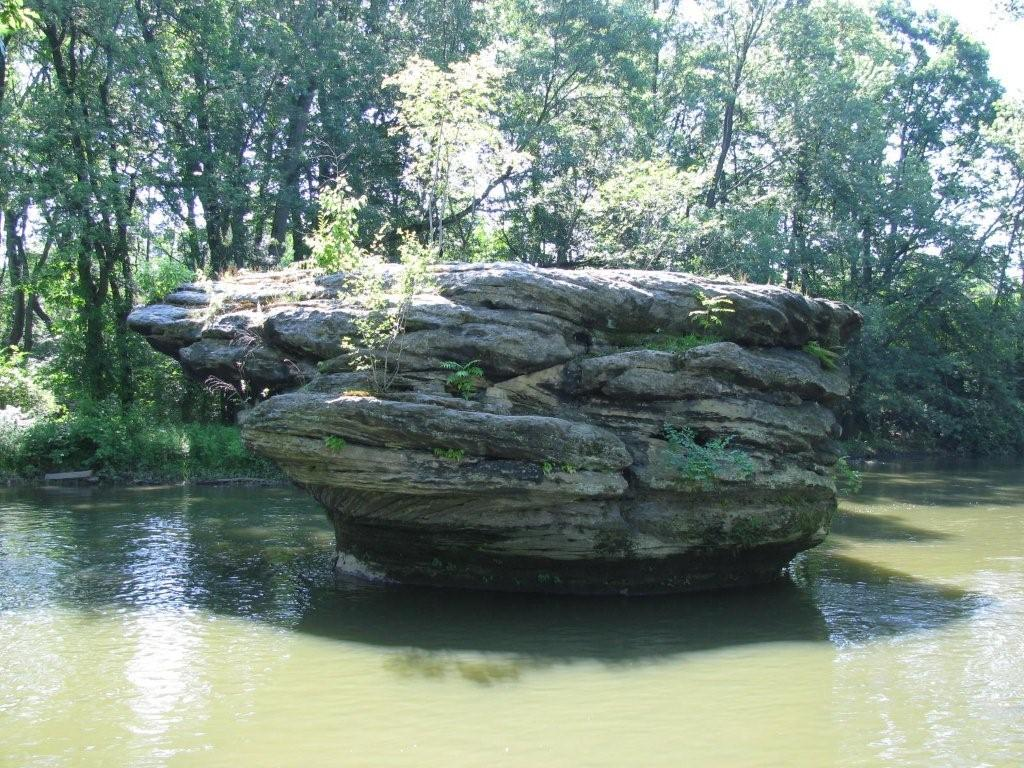
Standing Rock, located in northern Kent in the Cuyahoga River.

The region was previously inhabited by various tribes of American Indians including the Mound Builders for an unknown period of time. There is no record of any type of settlement in the area, but it was located near Native settlements in what is now Silver Lake and Cuyahoga Falls. It is believed a large rock in the Cuyahoga River, known today as Standing Rock, served as a place of council for these early tribes. Several trails crossed the area well before the arrival of European settlers. Around 1780 the Indian fighter Captain Samuel Brady achieved notoriety for his activities in the area, including his famous 21-foot (6.4 m) leap over the Cuyahoga River to avoid capture, known as Brady's Leap. After leaping the river, he hid in a nearby lake which was later named for him, Brady Lake.

=== Settlement ===
European settlement of the area began in the late 1790s and early 19th century. As part of the Connecticut Western Reserve, the area was divided into survey townships in 1798 and almost all of what is now Kent was originally part of Town 3 Range 9, which would eventually be known as Franklin Township. Aaron Olmsted, a wealthy Connecticut merchant, had purchased the 16,000-acre (6,500 ha) township for $2,000 (approximately $38,000 present-day) and named it for his son Aaron Franklin. Franklin Township was surveyed in 1803, and settled in November 1805 by John Haymaker, his wife Sally, and children Jacob, Eve, and Catherine. They initially lived in the former hut of the surveying team before settling on the banks of the Cuyahoga River in early 1806 and building a gristmill in 1807. That same year, Portage County was formed and Franklin Township was made part of the new county. Olmsted had hoped to have Franklin become the county seat of the new county and had land set aside in what is now northern Kent for the county government buildings. He died before he could donate the land and his heirs used it for other purposes. Neighboring Ravenna ended up becoming the county seat instead.

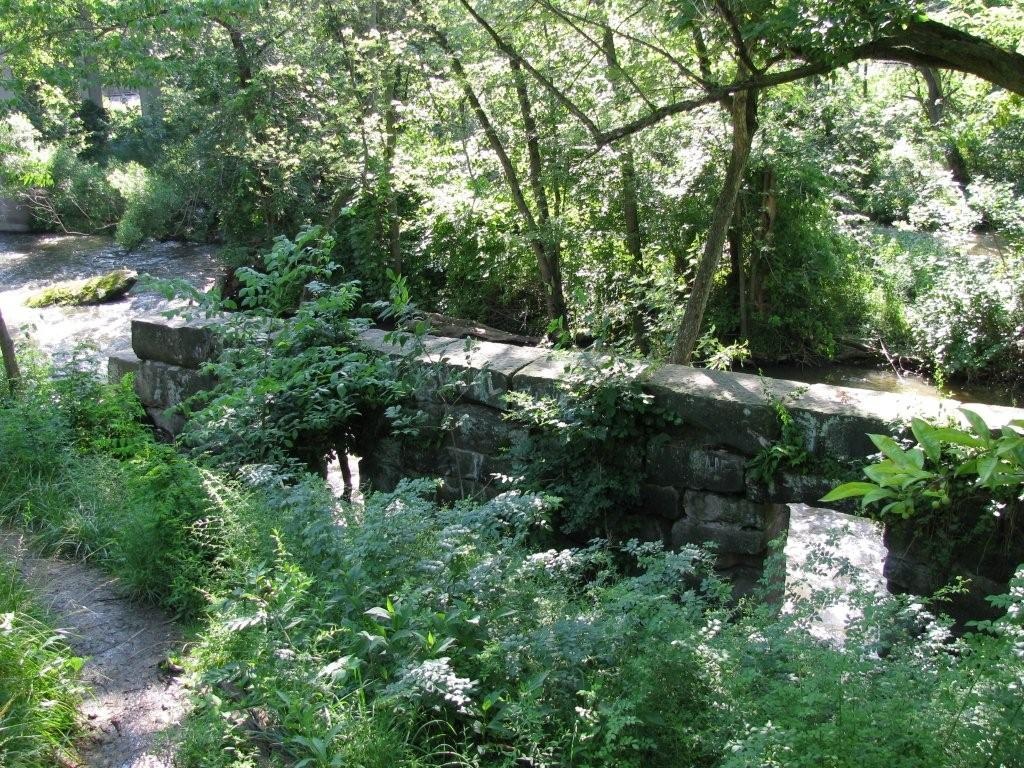
Ruins of the Kent flour mill, which stood 1837-1930s. It was built on the site of the original Haymaker Mill.

Initial growth in the area was slow, but eventually two small villages would develop due to the potential power generated by the Cuyahoga River that could be used in gristmills and manufacturing. Originally, there were two waterfalls in what is today downtown Kent, one of seventeen feet and another of twenty-five feet. The first village, known as Franklin Mills or locally as the "Lower Village," developed mostly around the original Haymaker property. In 1811 Jacob Reed purchased the Haymaker mill and the settlement was known briefly as Reedsburg until Reed sold the mill in 1817 and the name of Franklin Mills was restored. In 1818 Joshua Woodard arrived in the area and began constructing buildings just north of the village forming the "Upper Village" that would come to be known as Carthage. The two villages would become rivals for a time due to their close proximity to one another and the competing taverns which operated in them: the Woodard Tavern in Carthage and the Lincoln Tavern in Franklin Mills. By the time the Pennsylvania and Ohio Canal opened in 1840 and the construction of what is today downtown Kent was completed, the rivalry had effectively ended as did the distinction between the two villages. Today, the site of Carthage is a residential and commercial area on Kent's near west side and is found in the name of the side street Carthage Avenue in the same area.

=== Canal era ===
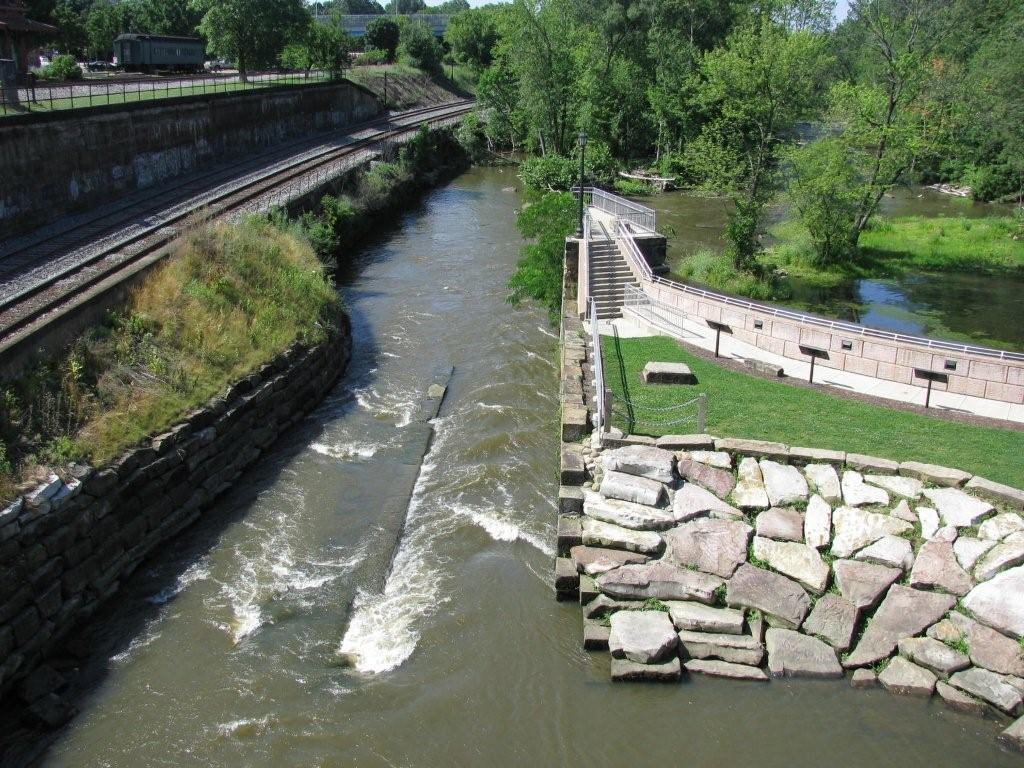
Former P & O Canal lock and dam in downtown Kent in 2008

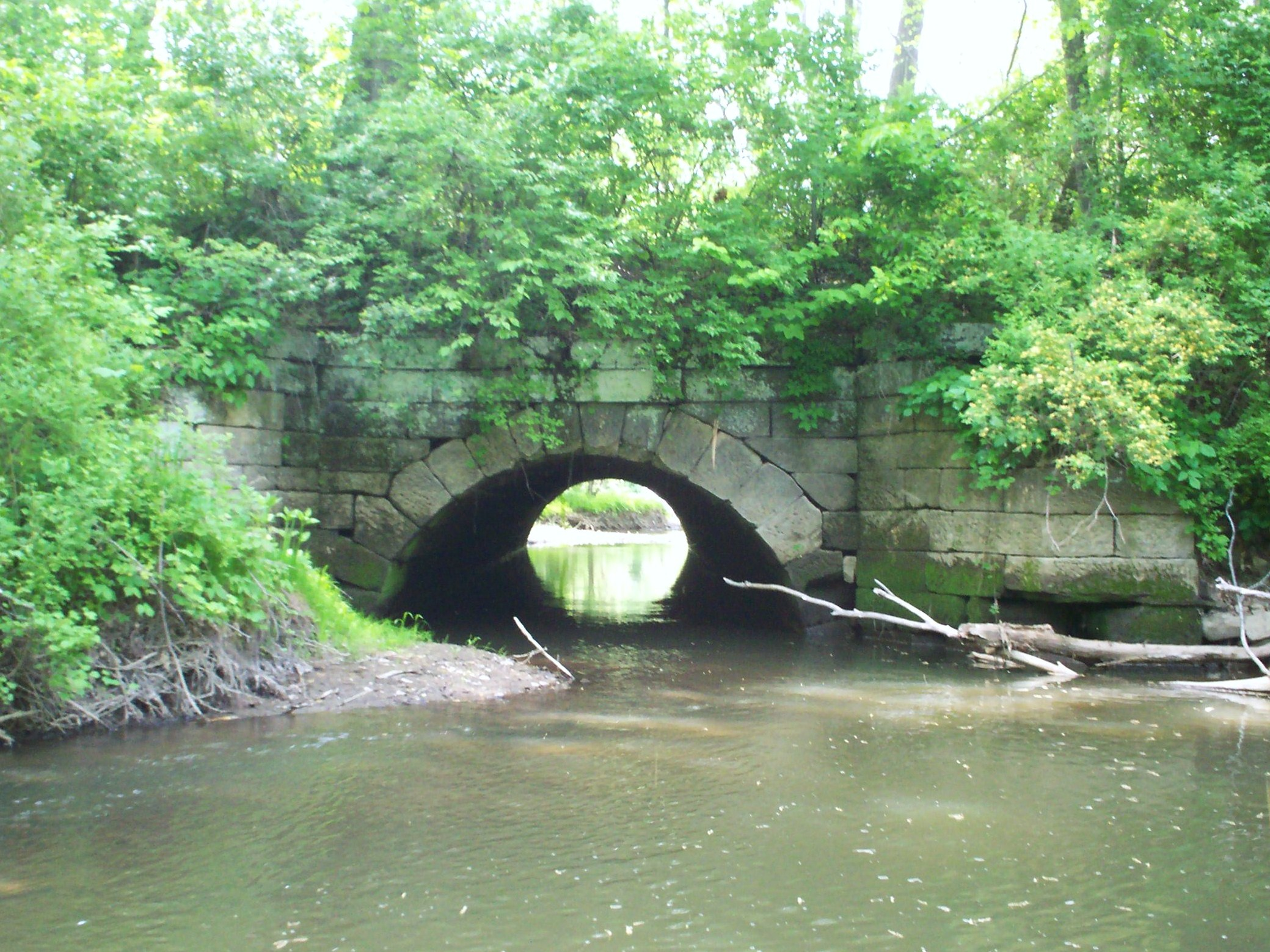
Former P & O aqueduct in southern Kent

In the 1820s and early 1830s, plans were drawn up for the Pennsylvania and Ohio Canal, which would connect Pittsburgh, Pennsylvania and Cleveland, Ohio via Akron, Ohio. Franklin Mills was selected as part of the route and due to the rocky gorge of the Cuyahoga River, construction of a lock and dam was necessitated. When construction began on the Pennsylvania and Ohio Canal in the 1830s, land speculation was rampant in many areas of northeast Ohio along the canal, including Franklin Mills. As a result of this, an industrial and business region was established along the river in what is now downtown Kent. Factories and mills were either planned or constructed along the Cuyahoga River, some of which either were never built or ultimately failed, due mostly to effects of the Panic of 1837. Much of the canal bed is still visible in downtown Kent, including the historic lock and arch dam (first built in 1836), which is the only known arch dam attached to a canal lock in the United States and is listed on the National Register of Historic Places. In addition, an aqueduct of the canal is still visible in southern Kent where it crossed Plum Creek. The era of the canal would be relatively short-lived, lasting into the 1860s. By 1870 the canal was completely shut down.

In the era leading up to the American Civil War, Franklin Mills was an active stop on the Underground Railroad, giving fugitive slaves shelter on their escape to Canada. Notable stops in Franklin Mills included the Cuyahoga House at the northwest corner of Cuyahoga Street and North Mantua Street (torn down in 1907), the Woodard Tavern at the southwest corner of Fairchild Avenue and North Mantua Street, and the Woodard house along Fairchild Avenue, which still stands today. During this period, in 1835, noted American abolitionist John Brown moved to the village, operating a tannery along the Cuyahoga River with Zenas Kent, leaving in 1839. Today, a park is on the site of the tannery, which was torn down in 1976 as part of an environmental reclamation project of the areas around the Cuyahoga River. On June 26, 2004, an historical marker was dedicated in downtown Kent commemorating the city's role in the Underground Railroad.

=== Railroad era ===
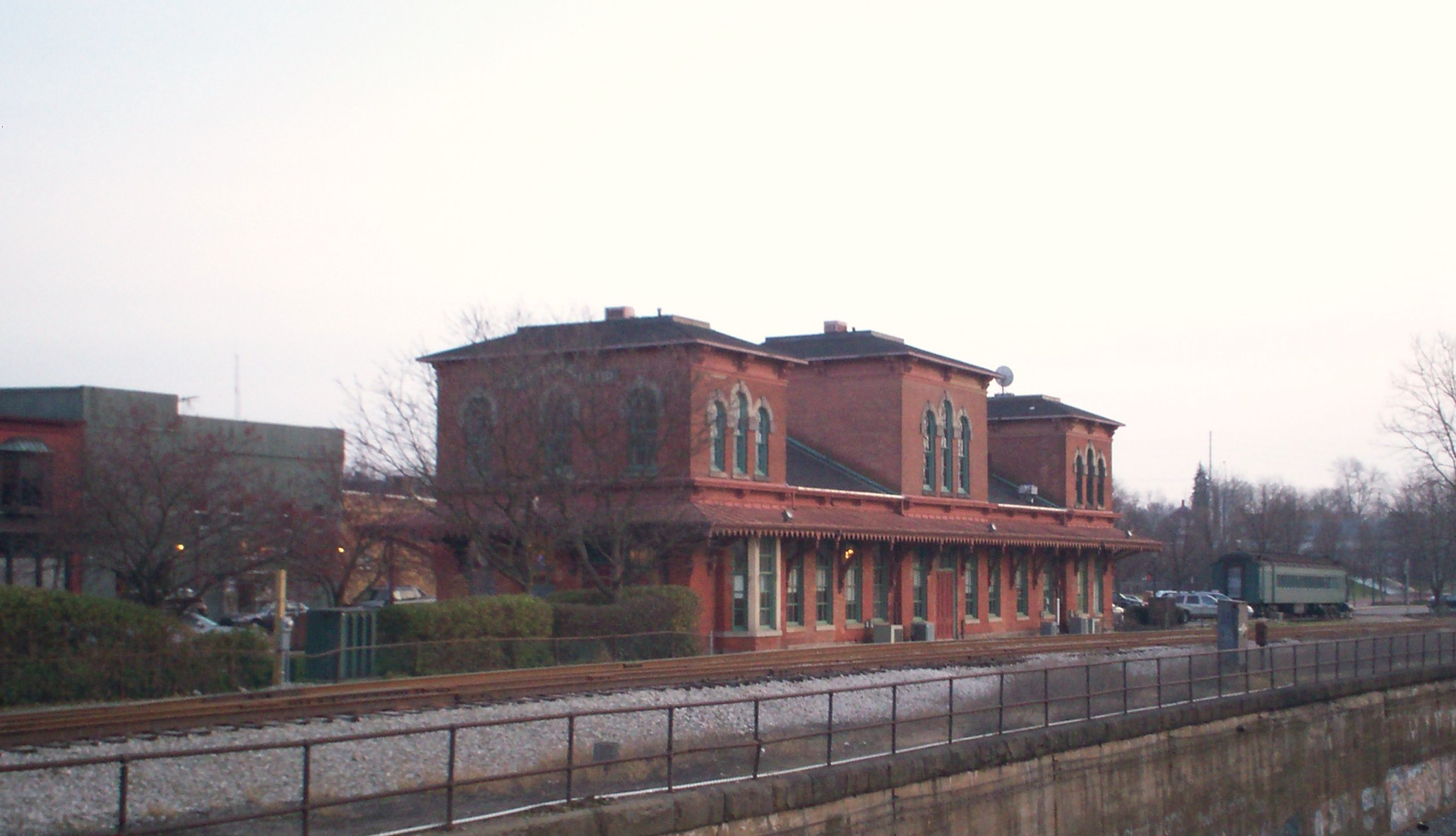
The former depot for the Atlantic & Great Western Railroad, built in 1875.

In 1863, a local businessman by the name of Marvin Kent was influential in bringing the Atlantic and Great Western Railroad through the village. The railroad reinvented the village as an important stop on the east–west line between St. Louis and New York City as it was also home to the railroad's maintenance yards and shops. To honor Marvin Kent the village was renamed Kent in 1864, although this change was not official until the village was incorporated on May 6, 1867. Originally, before naming the city after Marvin Kent, city leaders including Marvin Kent were also considering the name Rockton, a name which Marvin Kent actually preferred, (hence the name of the Masonic Lodge as Rockton Lodge) after Standing Rock.

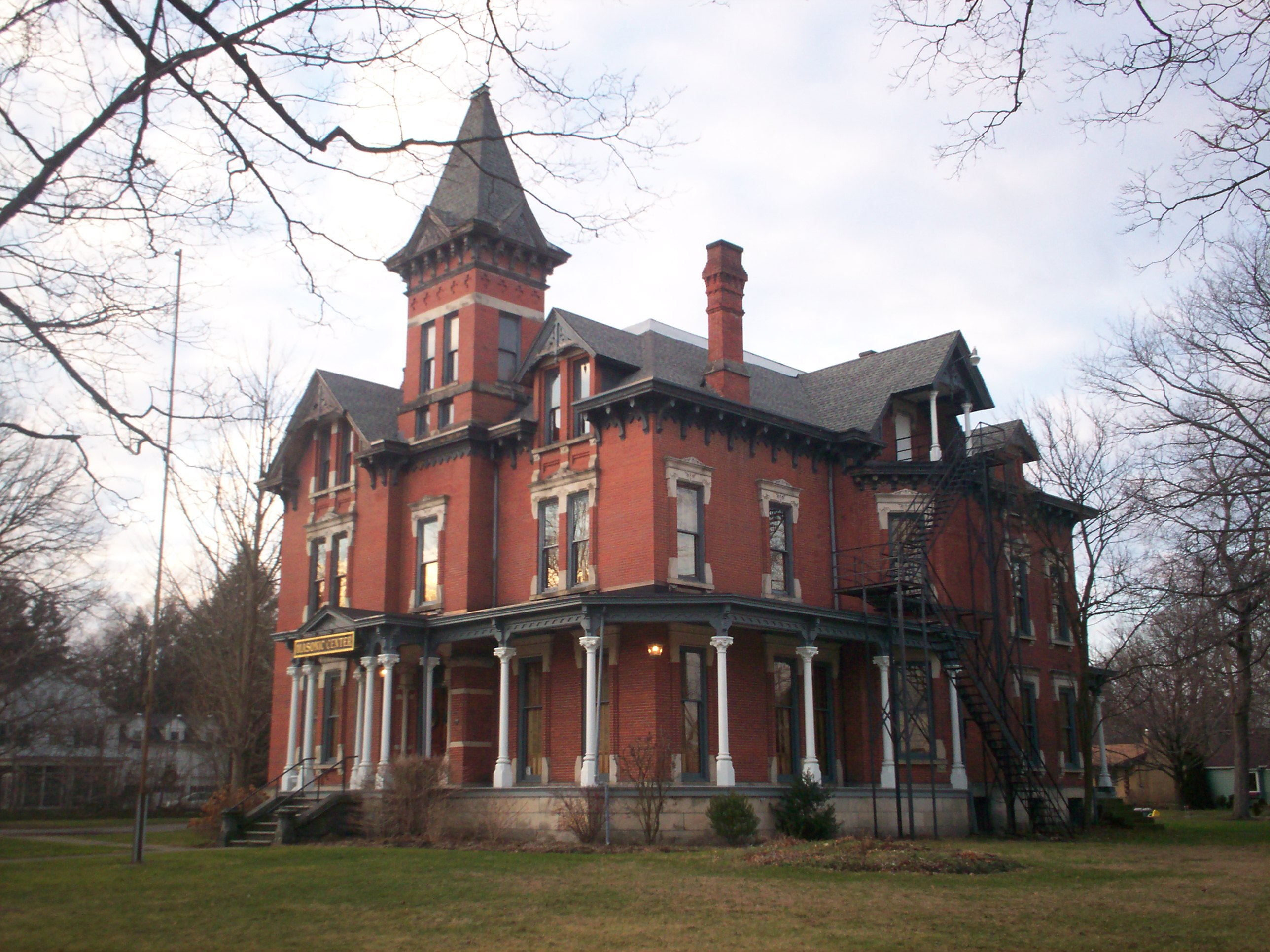
The home of Marvin Kent, built 1880 – 1884.

John Davey came to Kent in 1881 as head grounds keeper at Standing Rock Cemetery, planting several trees and landscaping the cemetery as well as performing experiments on trees. In 1901 he published his theories on tree surgery with his book The Tree Doctor and later established the Davey Tree Expert Company in 1909, which led to Kent becoming known as "The Tree City." On February 15, 1949, Kent was officially proclaimed "The Tree City of Ohio" by a resolution and has been designated as a Tree City USA for over 20 years. The city's official emblem features a tree logo and can be found on Kent's street signs and other city signs and offices.

== Twentieth century ==
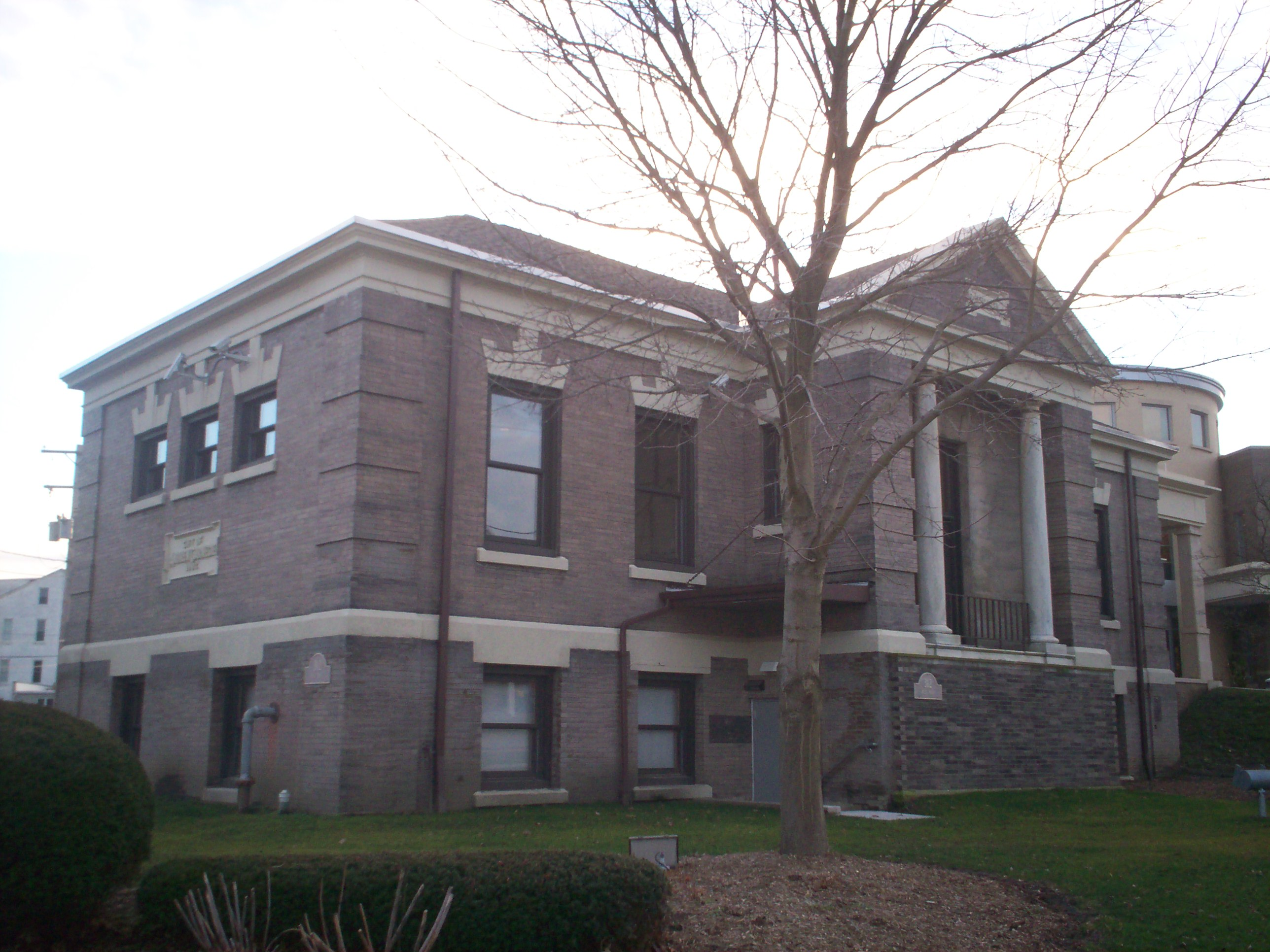
Carnegie portion of the Kent Free Library which opened in 1903.

With the opening of the Kent Free Library in 1892, Kent became the first municipality in Ohio to take advantage of a new state law which allowed municipalities with populations under 5,000 to tax residents for the upkeep of a library. In 1903, the library moved to its current location on West Main Street in a building that was financed by a $10,000 USD ($387,000 present-day) gift from Andrew Carnegie. Carnegie donated the money on the condition residents provided a site and US$1,000 ($38,700 present-day) per year for maintenance. The levy passed overwhelmingly on September 17, 1901, and the site was donated by Marvin Kent. Although additions have been made throughout the years, the original library building still stands today and currently houses the library's genealogy and local history areas. Most recently, all previous additions were demolished and a new, three-story addition was constructed which tripled the previous amount of available space. This new addition opened on September 26, 2006, exactly 103 years after the original library opened.

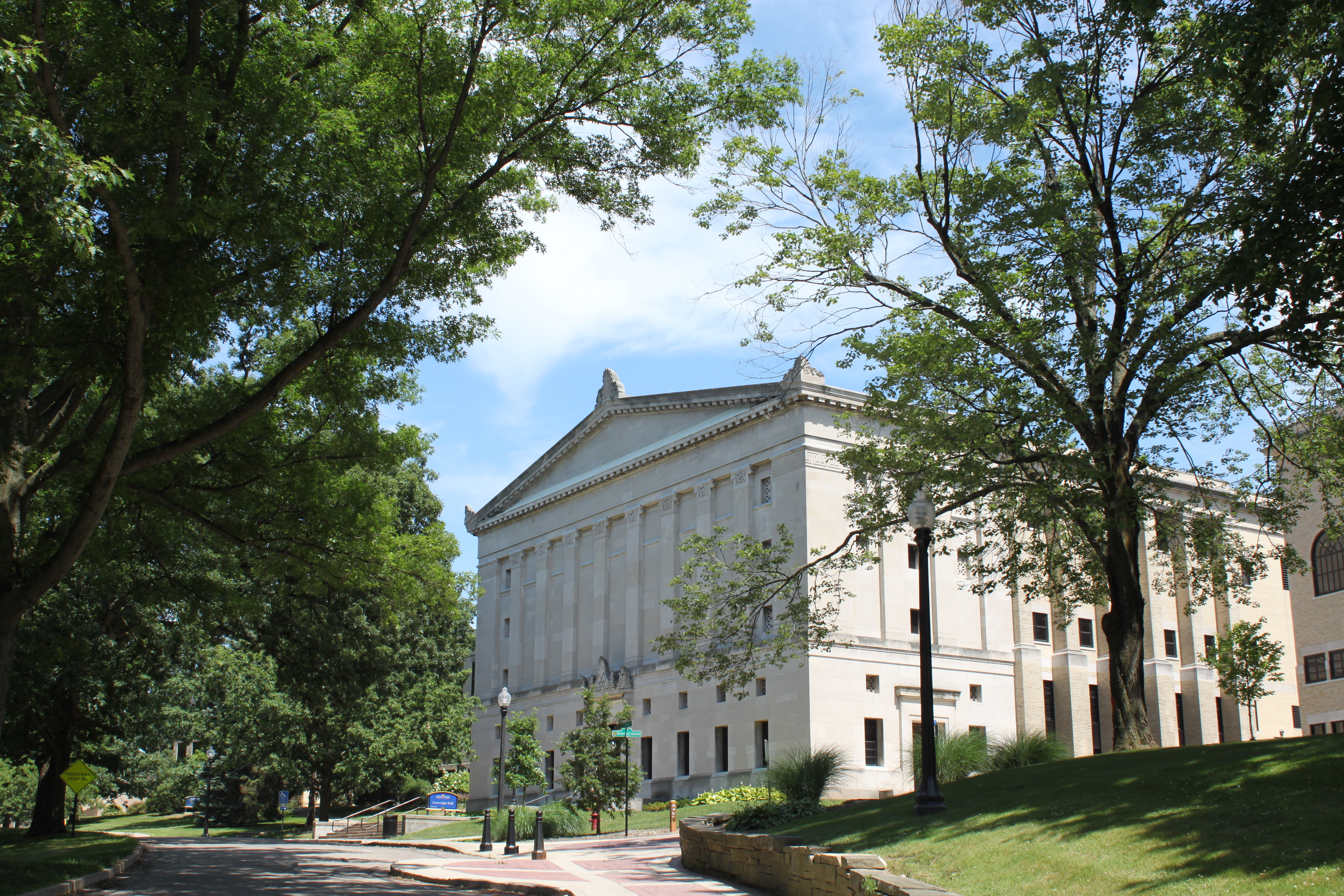
Original campus of Kent State University.

In 1910, Kent was selected out of twenty northeastern Ohio cities as the site of a new teacher training college, which became known as the "Kent State Normal School". The site for the school was on 53 acres (21 ha) of land donated by William S. Kent, son of Marvin Kent, on what was then the eastern edge of town. To honor his donation, the school was named for William S. Kent and not for the city of Kent, making it the only public university in Ohio to be named for an individual. In 1929 the school was renamed Kent State College after the establishment of a college of liberal arts and degrees in the arts and sciences and in 1935 was renamed Kent State University after it was authorized to grant advanced graduate degrees. The bill giving Kent State university status was signed into law by Ohio governor and Kent native Martin L. Davey.

In 1927 William and Frank Fageol, who had come to Kent in 1924, founded the Twin Coach Company, using their new design concept for buses. The Twin Coach factory produced buses, delivery trucks, and other similar vehicles. As bus demand declined in the mid-20th century the factory slowly declined as well with bus production ceasing by 1953. The company was sold in 1958 and subsequently moved to Cheektowaga, New York and the factory was completely shut down by the 1960s.

In 1961, Kent State grounds superintendent Larry Wooddell and Biff Staples of Davey Tree released ten cages of black squirrels obtained from Victoria Park in London, Ontario, Canada, to the Kent State campus. By 1964 their estimated population was around 150 and today they have spread in and around Kent and have become unofficial mascots of both the city and university. Since 1981, the annual Black Squirrel Festival is held every fall on the KSU campus.

=== Kent State shootings ===
In May 1970, protests began on the campus of Kent State University over the United States' invasion of Cambodia in the Vietnam War. Although demonstrations began peacefully on campus May 1, that evening a demonstration near the center of town was broken up by police after some participants broke storefront windows. Convinced that members of the Students for a Democratic Society and other outside groups were planning a major disruption, mayor LeRoy Satrom declared a state of emergency and requested help from Ohio governor James Rhodes, who dispatched an officer from the Ohio Army National Guard. Later that night as Kent police closed down the bars, several demonstrators—a mixture of locals, students, and others—blocked traffic along North Water Street, started a bonfire, and broke windows of 15 downtown businesses with an estimated $10,000 of damage before being pushed towards campus. The next day Mayor Satrom issued a dusk-to-dawn curfew. That night, an estimated 1,000 demonstrators witnessed the destruction of the Army ROTC building, which had been set on fire by some unidentified individuals. Protesters assaulted Kent firefighters and cut the fire hoses, preventing them from putting out the blaze, which was finally cleared by the arrival of the Ohio National Guard later that night.

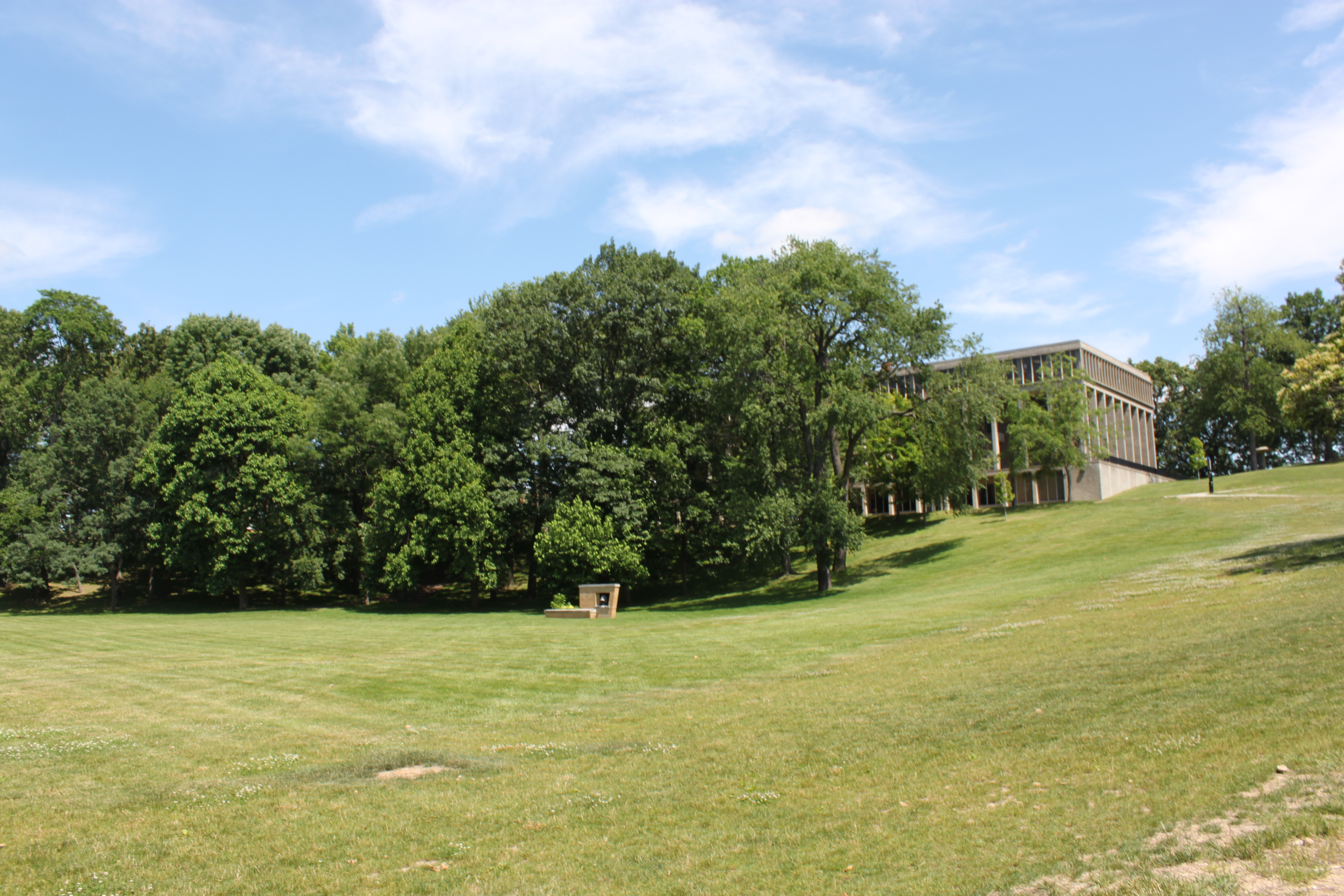
The Commons, Victory Bell, and Taylor Hall, site of the Kent State shootings in 1970.

On the evening of May 3 a demonstration took place on campus but was dispersed using tear gas. Demonstrators reassembled at the intersection of East Main and Lincoln Streets and blocked traffic and later became hostile. The crowd was dispersed around 11 PM again using tear gas with several guardsmen and demonstrators sustaining injuries. The events culminated on May 4 with the Kent State shootings, where four students were killed and nine were wounded. The shootings caused an immediate closure of the campus—which lasted until June 15—as well as the Kent City Schools, who sent students home early. All vehicles entering the Kent city limits were searched by armed guardsmen, who patrolled both the city and campus until May 8. The shootings received national and international press coverage and helped spark the nationwide Student Strike of 1970. They also put a large strain on relations between the city and the university. Kent would again be in the national spotlight in 1977 when a tent city was built on campus to protest construction of the university's gym annex near the site of the shootings.

=== Later 20th century ===
In 1975, the five-lane Haymaker Parkway opened. The parkway, a relocated section of Ohio State Route 59, includes two bridges that span all three of Kent's railroad lines. It was common for much of the 20th century for passenger and freight trains to block all three of the main crossings along the Erie tracks, which pass through downtown, effectively dividing the city in half. A bridge over both sets of tracks had been proposed as early as 1923 before a formal proposal in 1954. Construction on the project began in 1968 with bridge construction beginning in 1973. It involved 123 properties, many of which were razed, mostly along Stow Street. By 1980, however, rail traffic was drastically reduced and ceased to be a major problem.

In 1995, the city of Kent's municipal (tap) water won first place at the fifth annual Toast to the Tap International Water Tasting and Competition held in Berkeley Springs, West Virginia. The city and its award-winning water were featured on a segment of The Tonight Show with Jay Leno shortly thereafter.

== 21st century ==
The arch dam on the Cuyahoga River downtown just after completion of the Heritage Park project in 2005.

In 2003, the old arch dam was bypassed to meet water quality standards set by the Ohio Environmental Protection Agency. To preserve the historic dam, a small park was built behind the dam and the river was rerouted through the old canal lock. During warm-weather months, water is pumped over the dam. The park, known as Heritage Park, was formally dedicated in May 2005.

Beginning in 2008, several redevelopment projects in the downtown area, some of which had been discussed for decades, were put into motion and resulted in nearly $110 million in total investment from public and private sources. The first of these was the Phoenix Project, a development privately financed by Kent resident Ron Burbick that renovated and expanded a section of commercial space along East Main Street. Included in the project was construction of a pedestrian alleyway lined with small shops, eventually known as Acorn Alley, which opened in 2009. A second phase of Acorn Alley opened the next year. Other aspects of the redevelopment, which includes a 360-space parking deck and bus transfer station, a hotel and conference center, and three separate mixed-use buildings, began to take shape in 2010 following the demolition of several buildings in a four block area. New offices for Ametek and the Davey Tree Expert Company opened in late 2012 along with several new small businesses on the first floors of each building. The hotel, operated by Kent State University, is scheduled to open in June 2013 and the new parking garage, operated by the Portage Area Regional Transportation Authority (PARTA) opened April 30, 2013. Included in the redevelopment was the purchase and renovation of the old Kent hotel, which first opened in 1920. After being mostly vacant since 1979 and completely vacant since 2000, it re-opened on April 1, 2013, as the new home to the Kent location of Buffalo Wild Wings and will also house offices, a wine and jazz bar, and apartments. Construction started in early 2013 on an additional five-story apartment building in the adjacent block that was scheduled to be completed in 2014. The developments attracted the attention of The Plain Dealer and The New York Times and earned the city and university the 2013 Larry Abernathy Award from the International Town–Gown Association in recognition of the positive town–gown cooperation and collaboration.

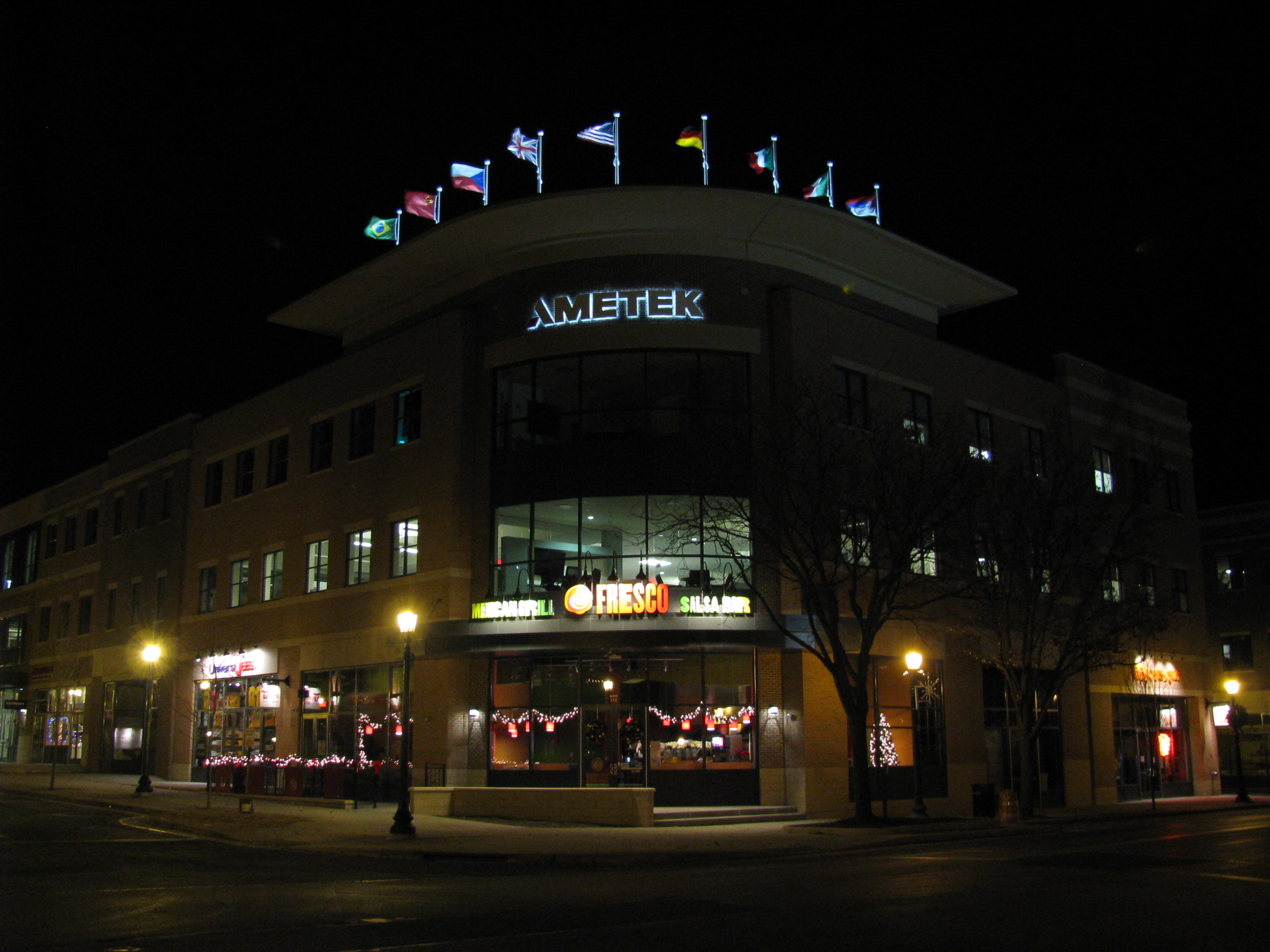
Kent offices of AMETEK, which opened in 2012

Additional development has been ongoing on the campus of Kent State University and the largely residential neighborhood located between downtown Kent and the western edge of campus. The university began buying properties in that neighborhood in 2007 and by December 2012 had acquired 43. Construction of the University Esplanade extension, designed to link campus with downtown, started in August 2012 after several of the buildings in the area, most of which had been rental homes, were demolished or moved. The Esplanade extension continued a segment of the Portage Hike and Bike Trail that extends to Dix Stadium and was completed in October 2013. Kent State is constructing a new $48 million, 107,000 square feet (9,900 m^{2}) facility for the College of Architecture and Environmental Design along the Esplanade extension and also relocated the former home of Mary Prentice, the first female faculty member at Kent State, to the extension as the home for the Wick Poetry Center. Construction on the architecture building started in October 2014 and was scheduled to be completed in 2016. In total, there are plans totaling approximately $150 million for several other facilities and upgrades across campus, including a new building for the College of Applied Engineering, Sustainability and Technology and a renovation and reorganization of the facilities for the School of Art.

== See also ==
- John Davey House
- Franklin Township Hall
- Kent City School District
- Charles Kent House
- Kent Industrial District
- Kent Jail
- Ohio State Normal College At Kent
- Masonic Temple (Kent, Ohio)
- West Main Street District
