= Franklin Township Hall =

Historic town hall in Kent, Ohio, US

- U.S. National Register of Historic Places
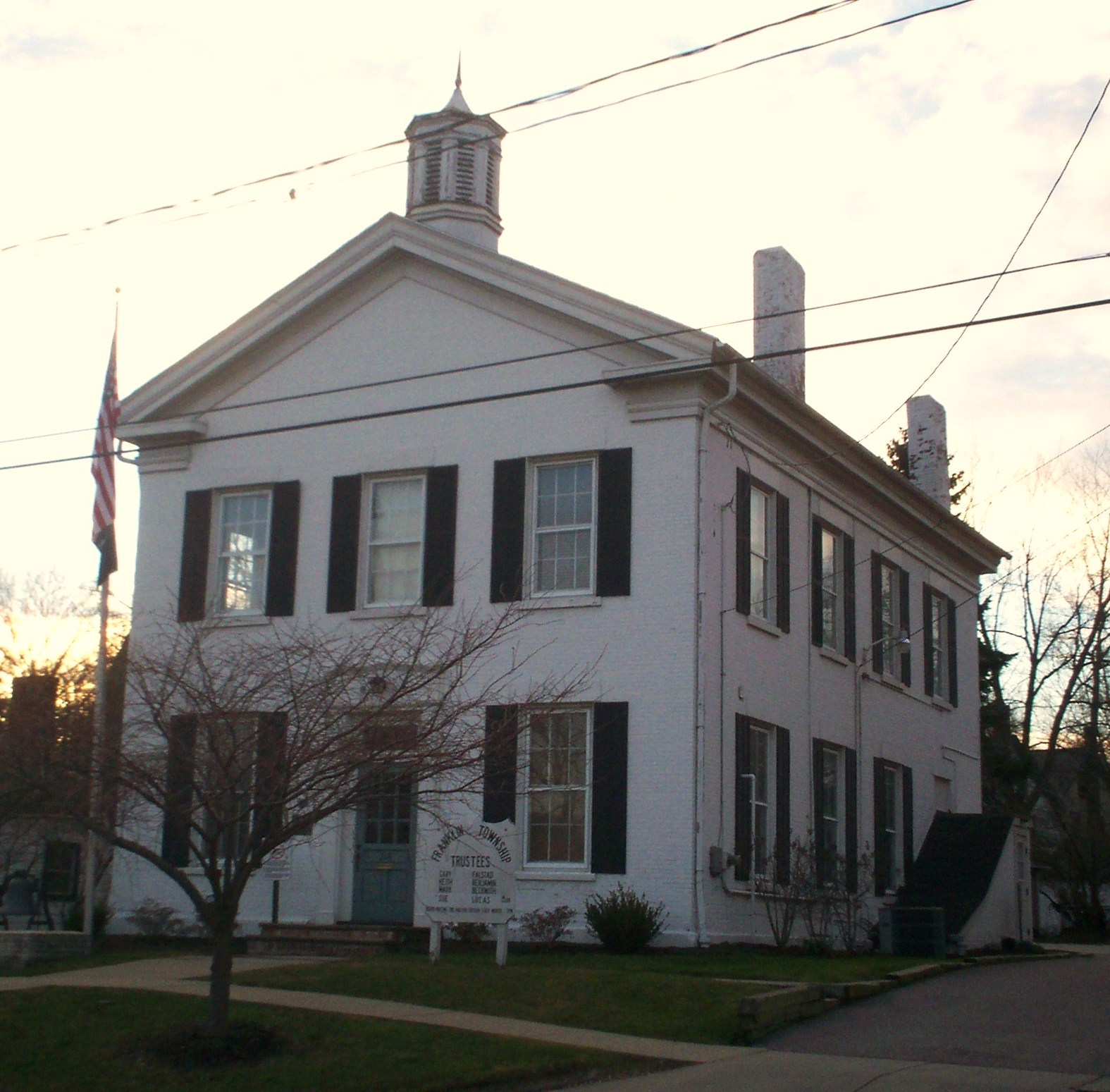
- Franklin Township Hall in 2006

- Location within Ohio Location within the United States
- Location: 218 Gougler Ave, Kent, Ohio
- Coordinates: 41°9′19″N 81°21′37″W
- Built: 1837
- Architect: Zenas Kent
- Architectural style: Greek Revival
- NRHP reference No.: 75001525
- Added to NRHP: October 10, 1975

The Franklin Township Hall, also referred to historically as the "Town Hall", is a town hall located in Kent, Ohio, United States, listed on the National Register of Historic Places. The building, located along Gougler Avenue in central Kent near the Cuyahoga River, was built in 1837 and has served as the seat of government for Franklin Township since 1840. It is best known for being the location where James A. Garfield was nominated for his first political office in 1859.

== History ==
The building was built in 1837 as an office for the Franklin Silk Company, which had been started on the belief that Kent (then known as Franklin Mills) would become a manufacturing center for the silk industry. This proved incorrect and the Panic of 1837 combined with northeast Ohio's unfavorable climate for silkworms led to the business failing. Franklin Township then purchased the building and finished it in 1840 to serve as the home of the township government.

=== James A. Garfield ===
On August 23, 1859, the hall was the site of a local Republican Party convention to nominate a state senator. The meeting produced a deadlock, and so to break it, James A. Garfield, who had not held any political office up to that point, was nominated. Garfield would go on to win the election as the state senator for an area which included Portage and Summit counties.

=== Other uses ===
Franklin Township Hall would serve as home to several schools in Kent's history, including a small private school beginning in 1857 prior to the establishment of a public school system. In the fall of 1868 through March 1869 the building was the first home of Kent High School due to construction delays on the new Union school building one block west. The second floor was later used as a school, known as "Riverview School" or "River Street School", for fifth and sixth graders during the late 1910s due to overcrowding at the other Kent public schools. From 1953 to 1978 the building was the location of the offices for the Kent City School District. During that time, the building was heavily damaged by a fire in 1971 which caused US$20,000 in damage. The hall also served as a meeting place for some of Kent's religious bodies including early meetings of the local Roman Catholic parish from 1862 to 1868 and the Universalist Church from 1866 to 1868. It was listed on the U.S. National Register of Historic Places on October 10, 1975.

== See also ==
- History of Kent, Ohio
- National Register of Historic Places listings in Portage County, Ohio
