= West Main Street District (Kent, Ohio) =

Historic district in Ohio, United States

- U.S. National Register of Historic Places
- U.S. Historic district
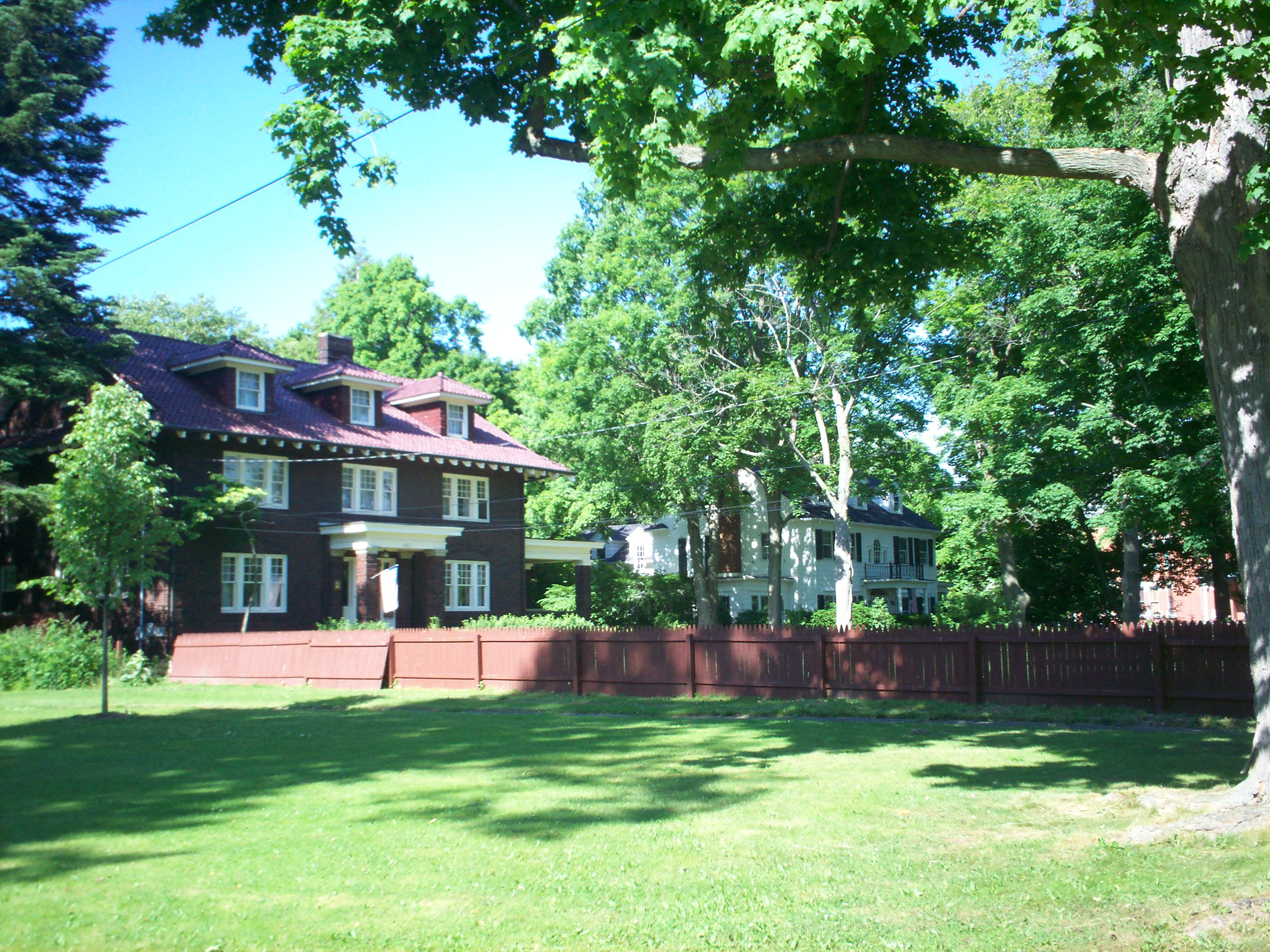
- Houses in the district in 2009

- Location within Ohio Location within the United States
- Location: 409–625 West Main Street; Kent, Ohio
- Coordinates: 41°9′14″N 81°21′56″W
- Area: 20 acres (8.1 ha)
- Built: Late 19th and early 20th centuries
- Architectural style: Commercial style, Eastlake, Gothic Revival, Greek Revival, Italianate, Queen Anne style
- NRHP reference No.: 77001082
- Added to NRHP: June 17, 1977

The West Main Street District is a historic district in Kent, Ohio, United States, listed on the National Register of Historic Places. The district encompasses 25 buildings, most of which are houses, on both sides of West Main Street from its intersection with North and South Mantua Streets on the east to the intersection with North and South Chestnut Streets. It was listed June 17, 1977. Included in the district is the Kent Masonic Center, itself listed on the register in 1974, as well as the home of Martin L. Davey, who served as Governor of Ohio from 1935 to 1939. The Brownstones on the corner of South Prospect and West Main Streets are the oldest apartments in the city (built 1901–1905) and are classic sandstone buildings. Architectural styles represented in the district include Commercial style, Eastlake, Gothic Revival, Greek Revival, Italianate, and Queen Anne style.

== See also ==
- History of Kent, Ohio
- National Register of Historic Places listings in Portage County, Ohio
