= Freedom Congregational Church =

Historic church in Ohio, United States

- U.S. National Register of Historic Places
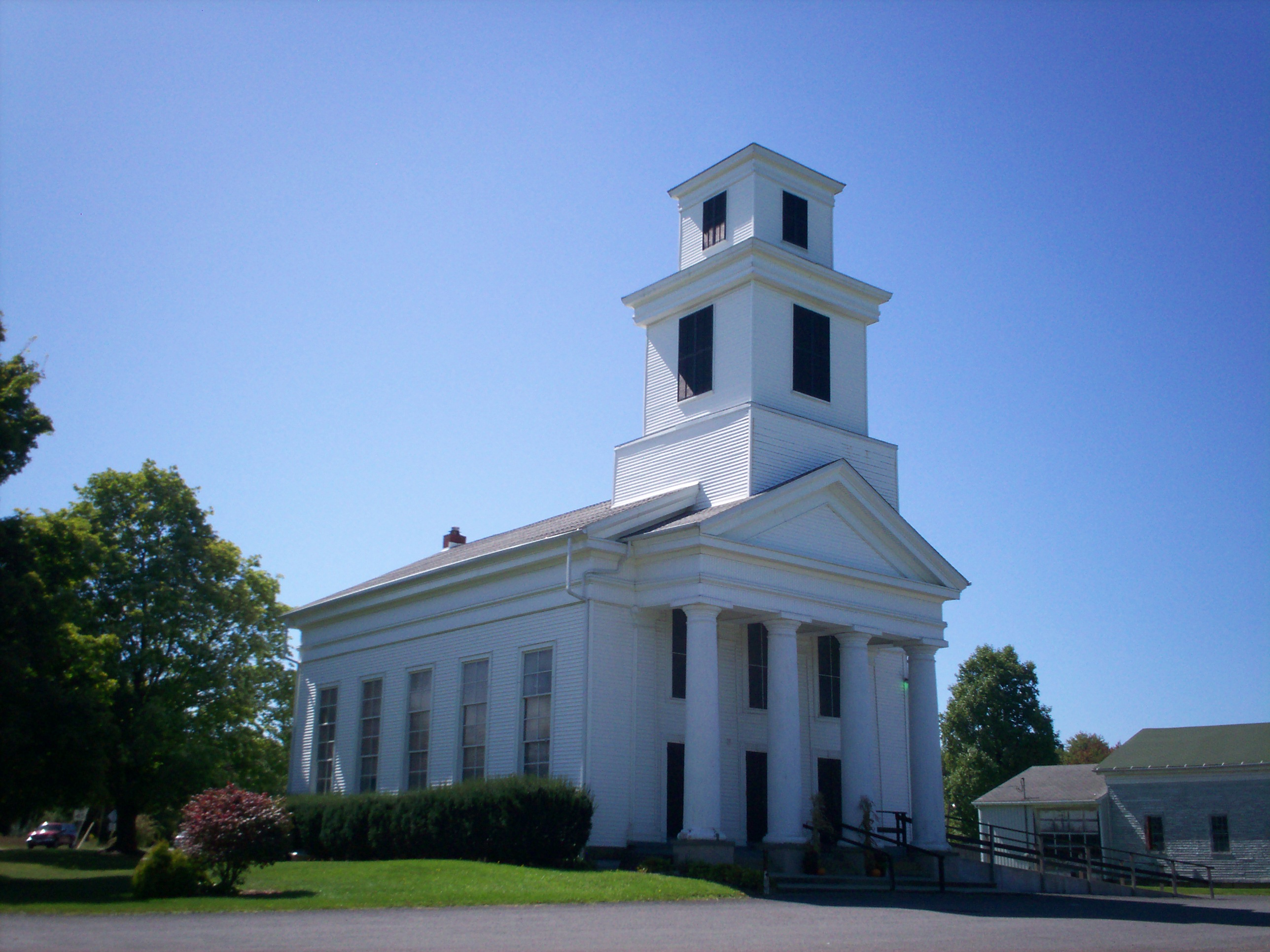
- Front view, September 2009

- Location within Ohio Location within the United States
- Location: Freedom Township, Portage County, Ohio
- Coordinates: 41°14′6.63″N 81°8′48.55″W
- Area: 2 acres (0.81 ha)
- Built: 1845
- Architectural style: Greek Revival, Federal
- NRHP reference No.: 75001521
- Added to NRHP: July 7, 1975

The Freedom Congregational Church is a registered historical building in Freedom Township, Portage County, Ohio. It was listed on the United States National Register of Historic Places on July 7, 1975. The church is located at 8961 State Route 88 in the triangular area near the center of Freedom where State Routes 88, 700, and 303 meet.
