= Marvin Kent =

American politician

- Born: September 21, 1816; Ravenna, Ohio, US
- Died: December 10, 1908 (aged 92); Kent, Ohio, US
- Occupation: Businessman
- Known for: Namesake of Kent, Ohio, Establishment of Atlantic and Great Western Railroad

Marvin Kent (September 21, 1816 – December 10, 1908) was a railroad president, politician, and businessman from Portage County, Ohio, United States, best known as the namesake of the city of Kent, Ohio, which was previously known as Franklin Mills.

== Biography ==
Marvin Kent was born in Ravenna, Ohio, and was heavily involved in the business dealings of his father Zenas Kent from a very young age. During the 1860s he was instrumental in establishing the Atlantic and Great Western Railroad and having the railroad shops located in the town of Franklin Mills. The town was named after him shortly thereafter in 1864. Kent also served as a bank president and as an Ohio state senator from the Republican party. He died in Kent, Ohio, in 1908.

== Relatives ==
Kent's father Zenas had several business ventures during the 1830s through the 1850s in Franklin Mills and briefly had a partnership with John Brown to build a tannery. While the tannery was completed in 1837, Brown left the partnership before the building was finished. He also had considerable land holdings and built a four-story commercial block in what is now downtown Kent in 1837 that was said to have been the tallest building in Ohio at the time. He eventually would relocate to Franklin Mills in 1851. Marvin Kent had two sons: Henry Lewis Kent and William Stewart Kent. Henry was the father of two daughters and the grandfather of Marvin Kent Curtis. William Kent played a key role in the establishment of Kent State University in 1910 by donating the land for the original campus.
