= Lee Road–Shaker Heights station =

Former park and ride railroad station in Cleveland, Ohio

LEE ROAD–SHAKER HEIGHTS
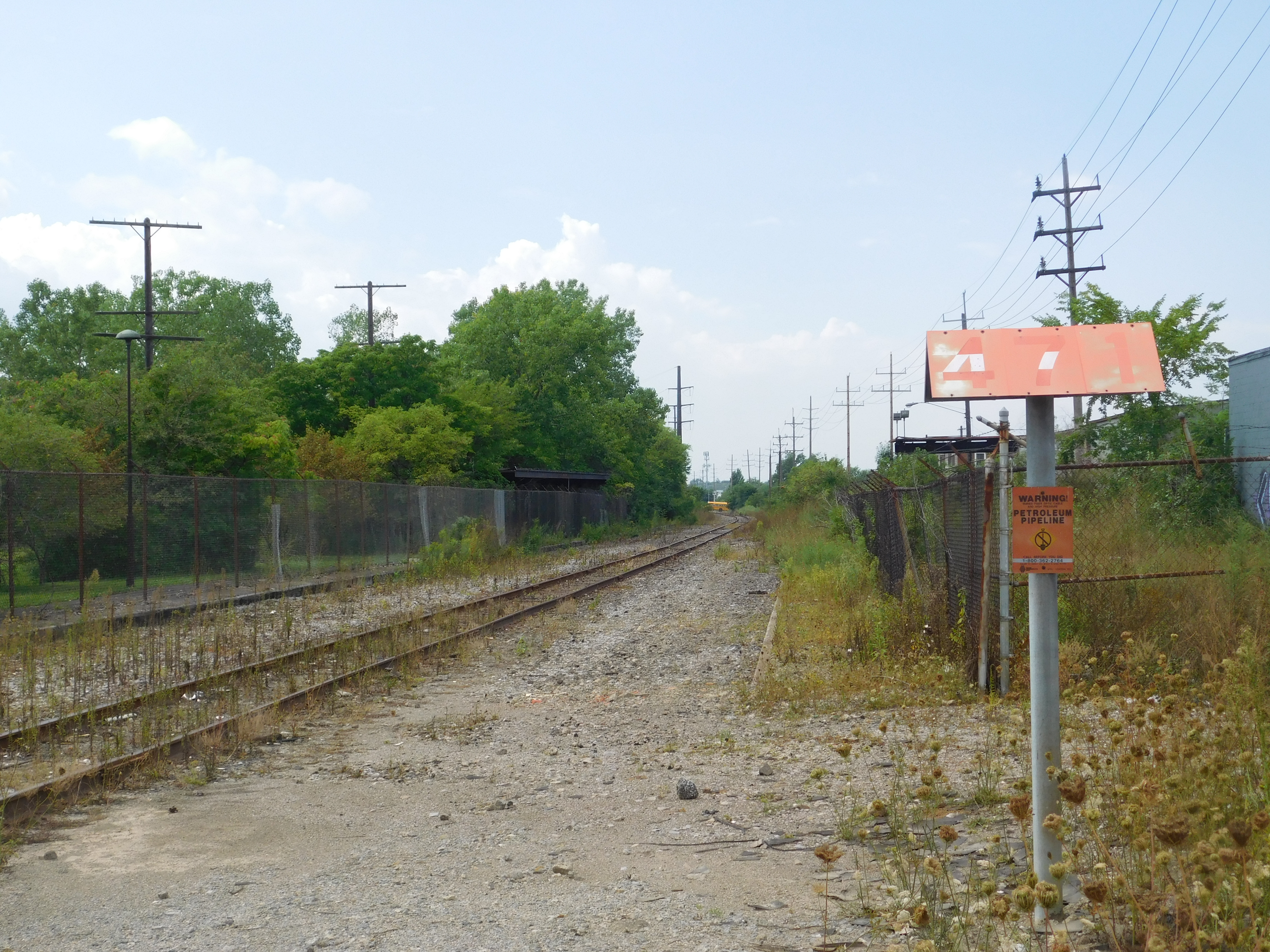
- The remains of Lee Road station in August 2016.

General information
- Location: Lee Road, just south of Miles Avenue (Route 43), Cleveland, Ohio
- Coordinates: 41°26′21″N 81°33′53″W
- Owner: Erie Railroad (1948 – 1960); Erie Lackawanna Railway (1960 – 1976); Conrail (1976 – 1977)
- Line: Mahoning Division
- Platforms: 2 side platforms

History
- Opened: November 22, 1948; 77 years ago
- Closed: January 14, 1977; 49 years ago

Former services
Preceding station	Erie Railroad	Following station
East 93rd Street toward Cleveland	Cleveland – Youngstown	North Randall toward Youngstown
Location

Lee Road–Shaker Heights was a former park and ride railroad station along Lee Road (just south of Miles Avenue (Route 43)) in the Lee-Miles neighborhood of Cleveland, Ohio. The station was located on the Erie Railroad's Mahoning Division, which ran from Pymatuning, Pennsylvania to Cleveland.

The station was first opened on November 22, 1948, by the Erie Railroad as a park and ride for commuters, with a parking lot and connections to bus and taxi. The station remained in service along the commuter line to Cleveland, which persisted after all passenger service was cut in the state of Ohio after January 5–6, 1970, when The Lake Cities last ran from Hoboken Terminal in Hoboken, New Jersey to Dearborn Station in Chicago, Illinois. The commuter train between Cleveland and Youngstown, Ohio was ended with the run of Train 28 by the Consolidated Rail Corporation (Conrail) on January 14, 1977. The station depot and canopy remain at the station site, but the roof has since caved in on the depot.

== History ==
=== Last train: January 14, 1977 ===
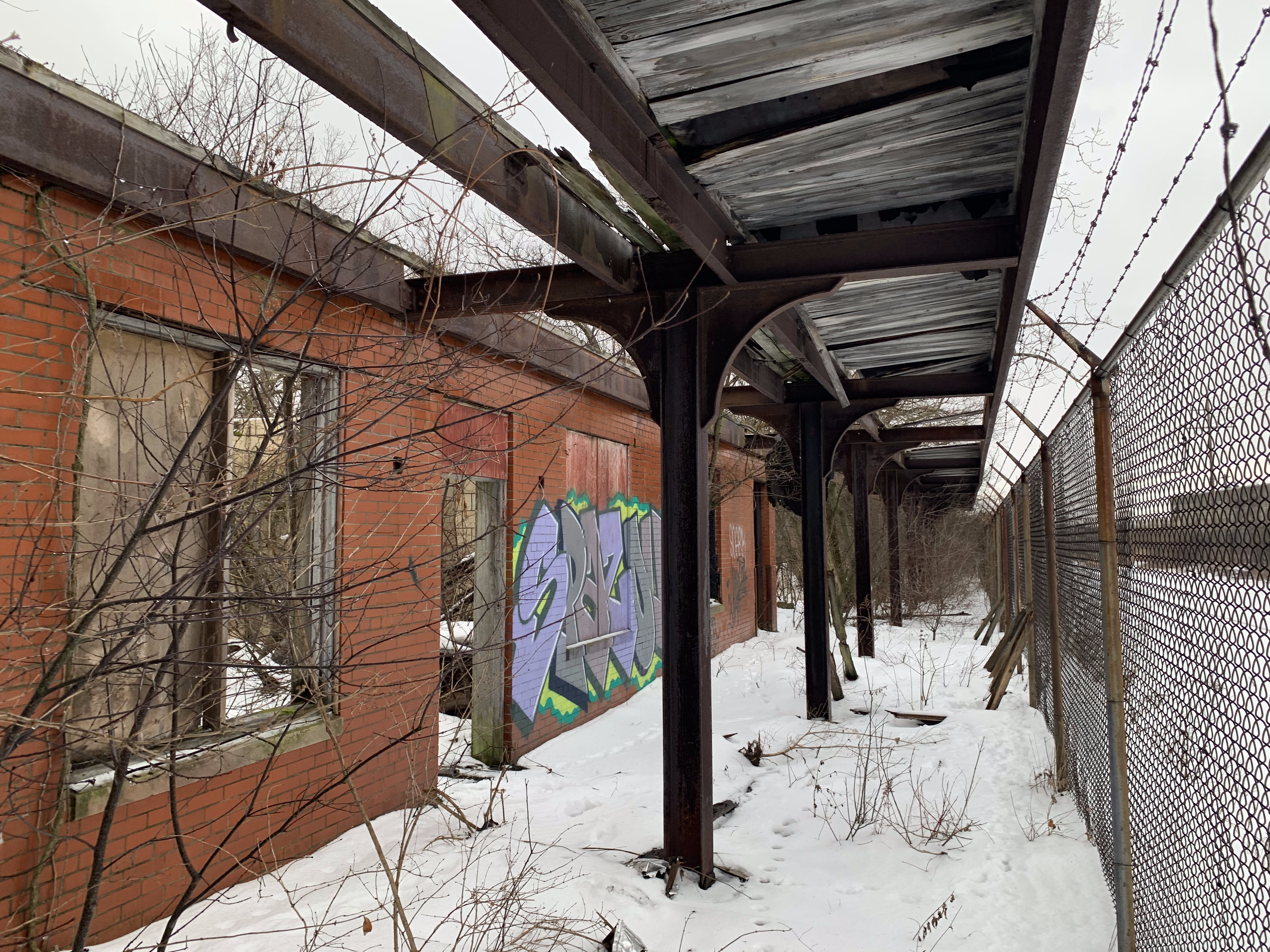
Station building and canopy, February 2021

After six month test run by Conrail, the agency officially ended service from Cleveland Union Terminal to Youngstown, due to loss of money. On a snow-covered January 14, 1977, numerous passengers, including railfans, historians and people interested in seeing or riding the train. People crammed themselves into the three cars attached with Engine 4014, playing games, talking and having refreshments as Train 28 left the Union Terminal at 5:24. The train made stops along the line to Youngstown including East 55th Street, Lee Road, North Randall, Solon, Geauga Lake, Aurora, Mantua, Jeddoe, Garrettsville–Hiram, Warren, Niles and into Youngstown. At the end of the ride in Youngstown, the train stayed for twenty minutes while the train got photographed by the railfans of the Railroad Enthusiasts. After that, the train deadheaded into Brier Hill Yard for the passenger cars to be detached, while the locomotive, 4014, was converted for use to freight service.

== See also ==
- Cleveland commuter rail

== Bibliography ==
- Camp, Mark (2007). Images of Rail: Railroad Depots of Northeast Ohio. Charleston, South Carolina: Arcadia Publishing. ISBN 9780738551159.
- Yanosey, Robert (2007). Erie Railroad Facilities (In Color). Vol. 3. Scotch Plains, New Jersey: Morning Sun Books Inc. ISBN 978-1582482088.
