= Warren station (Erie Railroad) =

Erie Railroad station in Ohio

WARREN
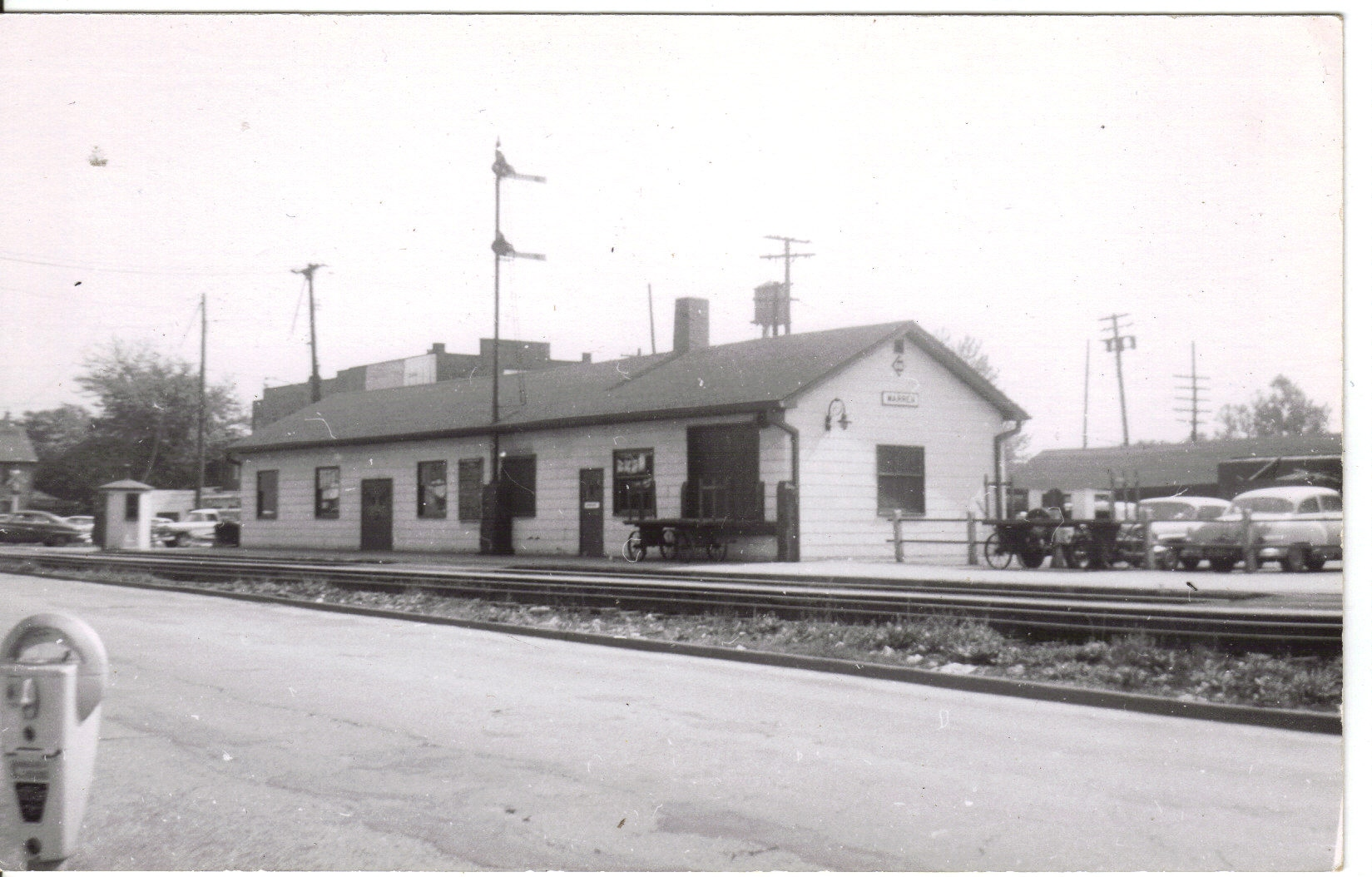
- The 1884 station depot in Warren, Ohio as seen in the 1965, a few years before demolition.

General information
- Location: South Street (US 422 / OH 169) at Main Avenue, Warren, Ohio 44483 (before 1966) Pine Avenue, Warren, Ohio 44483 (after 1966)
- Coordinates: 41.2334°N 80.8203°W
- Owner: Atlantic and Great Western Railroad (1864–1880) New York, Pennsylvania and Ohio Railroad (1880–1905) Erie Railroad (1905–1960) Erie Lackawanna Railroad (1960–1976) Conrail (1976–1977)
- Lines: Main Line (Mahoning Division); Mahoning Division First Sub-Division
- Platforms: 1 side platform
- Tracks: 2

Other information
- Station code: 5315 (Main Line); 5565 (Subdivision)

History
- Opened: 1864; 162 years ago
- Closed: January 14, 1977; 49 years ago
- Rebuilt: 1884; 142 years ago 1966; 60 years ago
- Electrified: Not electrified

Former services
Preceding station	Erie Railroad	Following station
Leavittsburg toward Chicago	Main Line	Niles toward Jersey City
Leavittsburg toward Cleveland	Cleveland – Youngstown	Niles toward Youngstown
Location

Warren was a former station for the Erie Railroad on its main line (Mahoning Division) and on the Mahoning Division's first subdivision between Cleveland and Pymatuning station. Along the main line, the next station west towards Dearborn Station was Leavittsburg, while east towards Pavonia Terminal was Niles. The station was located 585.7 miles (942.6 km) from Pavonia Terminal and 412.8 miles (664.3 km) from Dearborn Station.

Warren station consisted of a one-platform structure at the junction of South Street (U.S. Route 422 / State Route 169) at Main Avenue in the center of town. The station depot on Main Avenue was an Erie Type IV wooden frame depot that was shaped 24.5' x 50' x 17'. The site also included a watchman's shanty along Main Avenue and a Railway Express Agency building to the west of the station depot. The station also boasted a gauntlet track, that ran from milepost 53.12 to 53.67 (track miles from Cleveland), which ran trains at a maximum of 20 miles per hour (32 km/h).

However, during the 1950s, congestion on South Street began, due to the short, two-lane length of the roadway, along with the disruption of freight and passenger trains along the street. Of nine proposals studied, the eighth of which proposed widening South Street along the railroad side, was put into effect in 1965. The Railway Express Agency building was demolished, and new rails were installed on the opposite side of the station depot. By 1966, the new two-track main line was in place, and the gauntlet track was being torn up. The station depot, constructed in 1884, was closed and demolished by the Erie Lackawanna Railroad, while remaining passenger service was redirected to the freight depot on Pine Avenue, which was reformatted into a combined passenger/freight station.

Passenger service to Warren on the main line was terminated on January 4, 1970, with the final passing of the Lake Cities, while service on the subdivision was terminated on January 14, 1977, by the Consolidated Rail Corporation (Conrail).

== Station layout and design ==
The passenger station at Warren was located at the junction of South Street (U.S. Route 422 / State Route 169) and Main Avenue in the downtown of the city of Warren, Ohio. The depot, which ran alongside Main Avenue, was an Erie Railroad Type IV (types were determined in a 1918–1920 report to the Interstate Commerce Commission), with dimensions of 24.5 feet (7.5 m) wide, 50 feet (15 m) long, 17 feet (5.2 m) high. The station depot was built out of wood, similar to a nearby watchman's shanty. The station location was home to a Railway Express Agency building constructed just to the west of the passenger station. The freight station was constructed several blocks to the east, constructed out of full brick.

The station boasted two passenger tracks, along with a gauntlet track, which served from mileposts 53.12 to 53.67 (which ran alongside the depot, with track miles from the station at Cleveland, Ohio, which served as the western terminus of the Cleveland and Mahoning Valley Railroad).

== History ==
=== Atlantic & Great Western Railroad ===
The alignment that the Warren station was situated at was first started in July 1853, constructing the Franklin and Warren Railroad. This railroad changed names to the Atlantic and Great Western Railroad (A&GW) two months later. After connecting to the Cleveland and Mahoning Valley Railroad in 1856, the railroads soon became part of the same system. The new A&GW opened complete passenger service in 1864, after being connected to the rest of the New York, Lake Erie and Western Railroad. After becoming the New York, Pennsylvania and Ohio Railroad (NYPANO), the railroad soon changed hands again to the Erie Railroad, which took over in 1896, and after being bought out by the railroad.

During this time, a new Type IV station depot was opened in Warren, twenty years after the inaugural service. In the early 1900s, a new brick freight station was constructed at Pine Street, further down the line. This was due to the growth of freight throughout Trumbull County, necessitating a new depot being constructed.

=== South Street widening ===
In the 1950s, traffic within Warren was beginning to because more congested, and a study was conducted in 1951 by a professor at Kent State University in Kent, Ohio. The study concluded that were two types of problems in the city, geographic and mixture of different kinds of traffic. Warren suffered from factors of problematic locations for the commercial core, schools, churches, industries, along with various classes of people. However, a main problem stemmed from the lack of roadways. Warren boasted an insufficient number of alternate routes through the city. South Street (US 422 / OH 169) had considerable problems in terms of traffic due to the fact that between Main Avenue and Pine Avenue, the Erie Railroad ran down the center of the street. The north side of the street was for moving traffic, but the southern side was purely for parking. The trains running down the track was a hazard to the pedestrians and automobiles, but otherwise posed no serious threat. In 1947, South Street recorded 12.5% of the accidents within the city of Warren, and by 1948, this had been reduced by 24%. This was due to reduction of speed limits and a city campaign to slow down.

The professor proposed nine solutions to solving the issues of congestion within the city of Warren. The first proposed rerouting trucks out of the city's downtown, however it was dismissed due to the fact that the time lost in bypassing would equal time lost in congestion. Other proposals included turning Warren's downtown into a maze of one-way streets, upgrading South Street with traffic-based green lights, police supervision, radio campaigns and razing a "slum" neighborhood for parking. Two options however, called for the widening of streets, including South Street, which would require the upgrade along the stretch that the railroad shares between Main and Pine.

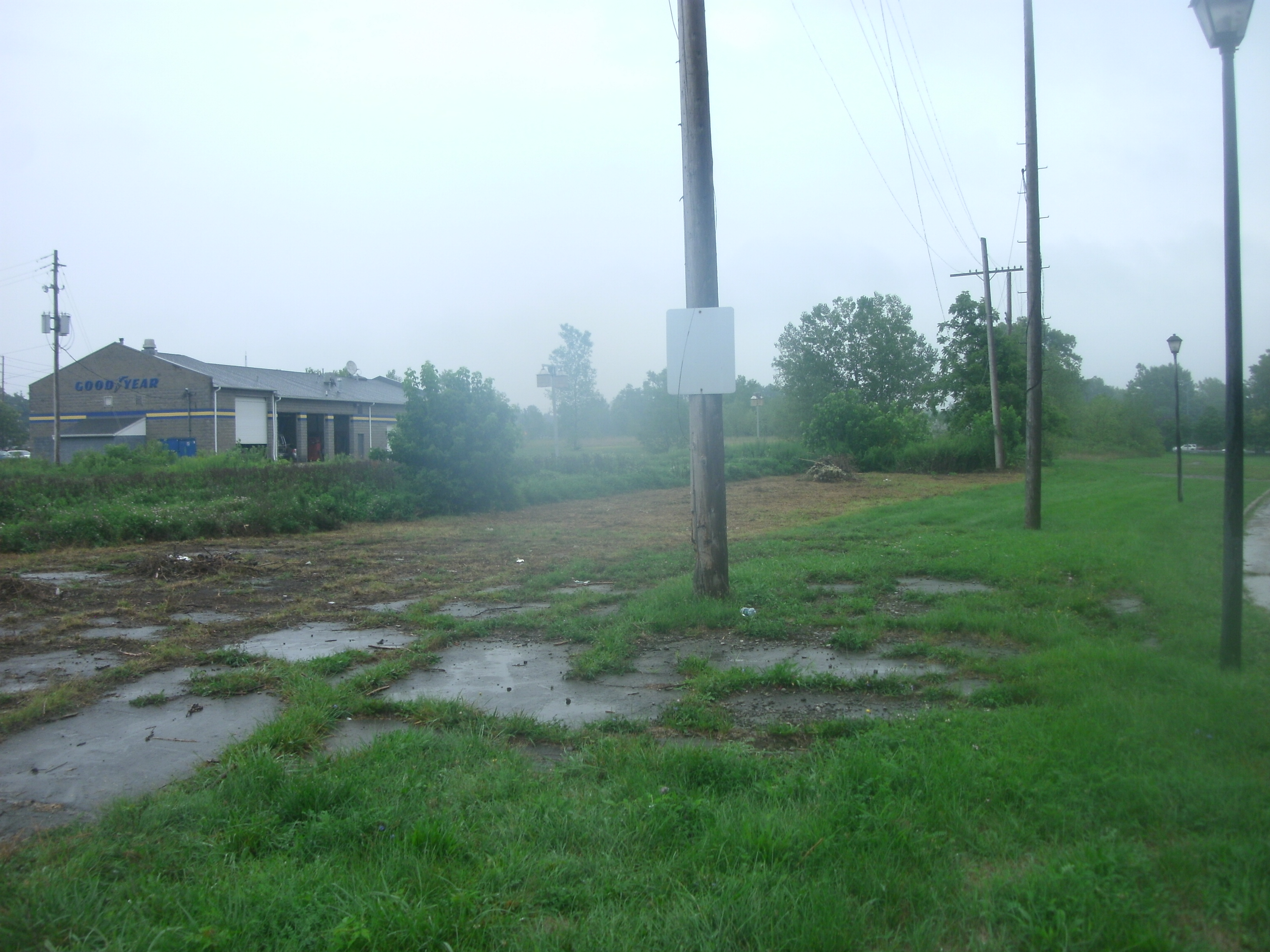
Warren station post-1966 site in August 2012

In the later months of 1965, widening of South Street through the center of Warren began. As a result, the Railway Express Agency building next to the depot was demolished for construction of a new right-of-way on the parking side of South Street. The new right-of-way would leave South Street just east of the current depot site, which required the demolition. The first rails were placed in December 1965, and by January 1966, the new two track-main had been installed and put into use. At that time, the old gauntlet track through Warren was being dismantled along South Street, which would be required to allow widening of South Street. It was at that point that the old station depot was closed by the Erie Lackawanna. The railroad did not put up proper signage for the change, deciding it was easier to scratch the notice of the station depot closing in the wood of the door. The freight depot located at the Pine Avenue crossing near South Street was renovated to allow a passenger depot area to be constructed within the building. The station depot back on South Street at Main Avenue was dismantled.

=== Closure ===
During the later years of the Erie Railroad, Warren station had been served by twelve trains daily, including the Lake Cities which ran between Dearborn Station in Chicago and Hoboken Terminal in Hoboken, New Jersey, and local commuter runs from Youngstown to Cleveland Union Terminal on the Mahoning first-subdivision. In the late 1960s, the Erie Lackawanna was cutting several long distance trains from its schedule, including the Phoebe Snow in November 1966. By June 1969, the Erie Lackawanna had applied to the Interstate Commerce Commission to discontinue service of the Lake Cities, citing that is not worth the money being expedited combined with the railroad's financial status. On December 25, 1969 (Christmas Day), the ICC approved it, and the Erie Lackawanna promised to keep it running through the holiday season, with the last trains to run on January 4, 1970 out of Hoboken Terminal. On the evening of January 4, 1970, the last Lake Cities left Hoboken Terminal, guided by locomotive No. 826, marking the final through passenger train passing through Warren.

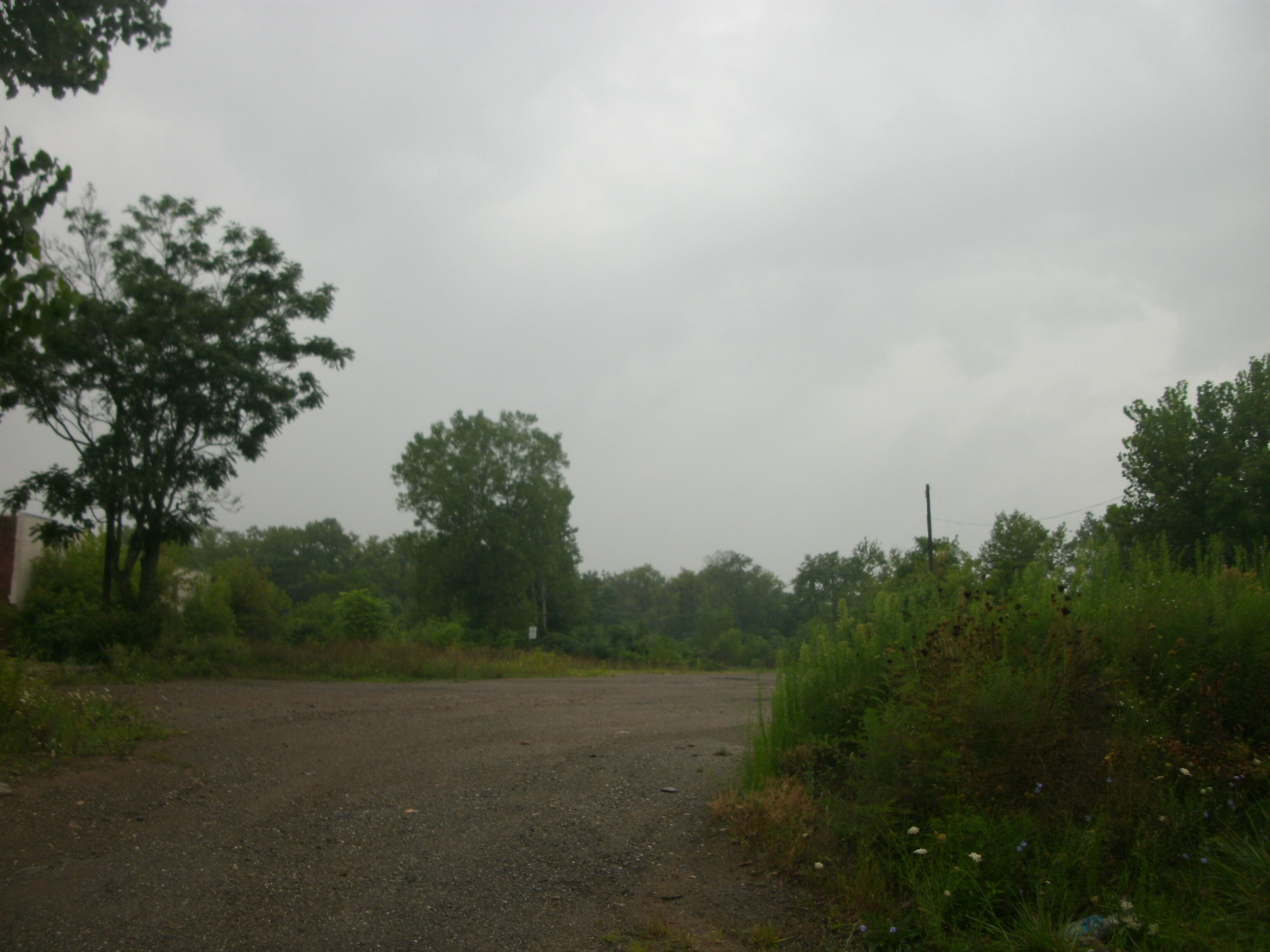
The station site of the 1884 depot, seen in August 2012

After the discontinuing of the Lake Cities, the Erie Lackawanna maintained one passenger service west of the New York Division, and that was the commuter rail line from Youngstown to Cleveland. After Hurricane Agnes destroyed a lot of the right-of-way in 1972, and a Marion Yard in Marion, Ohio rebuild did not get the approved permits in 1975, the Erie Lackawanna agreed to merge with several other companies, including Penn Central to join a new government run railroad. On April 1, 1976, the merger went into effect and became the Consolidated Rail Corporation (Conrail).

Conrail agreed to maintain the commuter line, but after six month test run by Conrail, the agency officially ended service from Cleveland Union Terminal to Youngstown, due to loss of money. On a snow-covered January 14, 1977, numerous passengers, including railfans, historians and people interested in seeing or riding the train. People crammed themselves into the three cars attached with Engine 4014, playing games, talking and having refreshments as Train 28 left the Union Terminal at 5:24. The train made stops along the line to Youngstown including East 55th Street, Lee Road, North Randall, Solon, Geauga Lake, Aurora, Mantua, Jeddoe, Garrettsville–Hiram, Warren, Niles and into Youngstown. At the end of the ride in Youngstown, the train stayed for twenty minutes while the train got photographed by the railfans of the Railroad Enthusiasts. After that, the train deadheaded into Brier Hill Yard for the passenger cars to be detached, while the locomotive, 4014, was converted for use to freight service.

== Bibliography ==
- Camp, Mark (2007). Images of Rail: Railroad Depots of Northeast Ohio. Charleston, South Carolina: Arcadia Publishing. ISBN 9780738551159.
- Taber, Thomas Townsend; Taber, Thomas Townsend III (1980). The Delaware, Lackawanna & Western Railroad in the Twentieth Century. Vol. 1. Muncy, PA: Privately printed. ISBN 0-9603398-2-5.
- Yanosey, Robert (2007). Erie Railroad Facilities (In Color). Vol. 3. Scotch Plains, New Jersey: Morning Sun Books Inc. ISBN 978-1582482088.
