= Red House station =

Erie Railroad station in New York

Red House
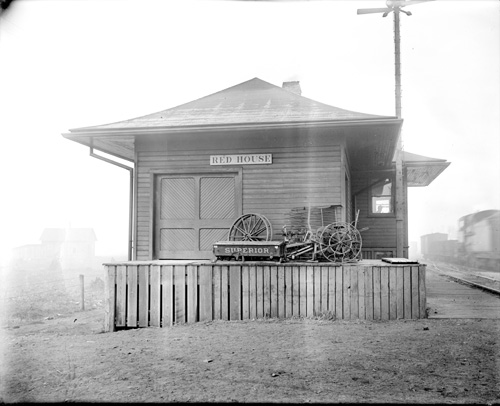
- The Red House, New York train station for the Erie Railroad.

General information
- Location: Red House, NY
- Coordinates: 42.112727°N 78.819089°W
- Owner: Atlantic and Great Western Railroad (1864–1880) New York, Pennsylvania and Ohio Railroad (1880–1905) Erie Railroad (1905–1960) Erie Lackawanna Railroad (1960–1976) Conrail (1976–1977)
- Line: Main Line
- Platforms: 1 side platform
- Tracks: 2

Other information
- Station code: 5003

History
- Electrified: Not electrified

Former services
Preceding station	Erie Railroad	Following station
Steamburg toward Chicago	Main Line	Salamanca toward Jersey City
Location

Red House was a passenger and freight station and signal tower for the Erie Railroad in the town of Red House in Cattaraugus County, New York.

The station was located 421.3 miles (678.0 km) from New York and 577.2 miles (928.9 km) from Chicago.

== Station layout and design ==
The small station was a combination tower and station. This tower controlled traffic between the eastbound and westbound mains which separated and converged again at Steamburg to the west. The separation between the tracks is clearly seen on the topographic map below.

The tower portion of Red House station is separate from the RH Tower, which was located to the west of Steamburg and was the eastern end of an 11-mile section of single-track mainline running through Randolph to Waterboro.

== History ==
It is unclear when the station was originally constructed, but an 1870 inventory of the Atlantic and Great Western Railroad listed the station in Red House as "Passenger and freight house in one building, 18x68, frame good but unpainted" and listed a water tower and 10x12 foot handcar shed at the same location.

The Red House railroad depot was located near the mouth of Meetinghouse Run, over a mile west of Red House's population center and separated by the Allegheny River, which limited its practical use. By December 1935, the depot no longer appeared as a station on Erie Railroad passenger timetables.

== Gallery ==
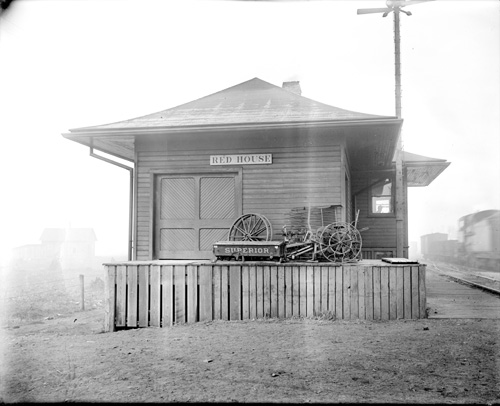

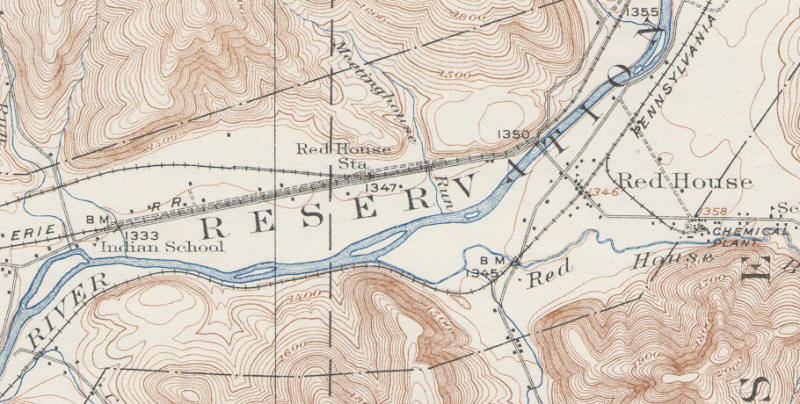
