= Salamanca station =

Railroad station in Salamanca, New York

Salamanca
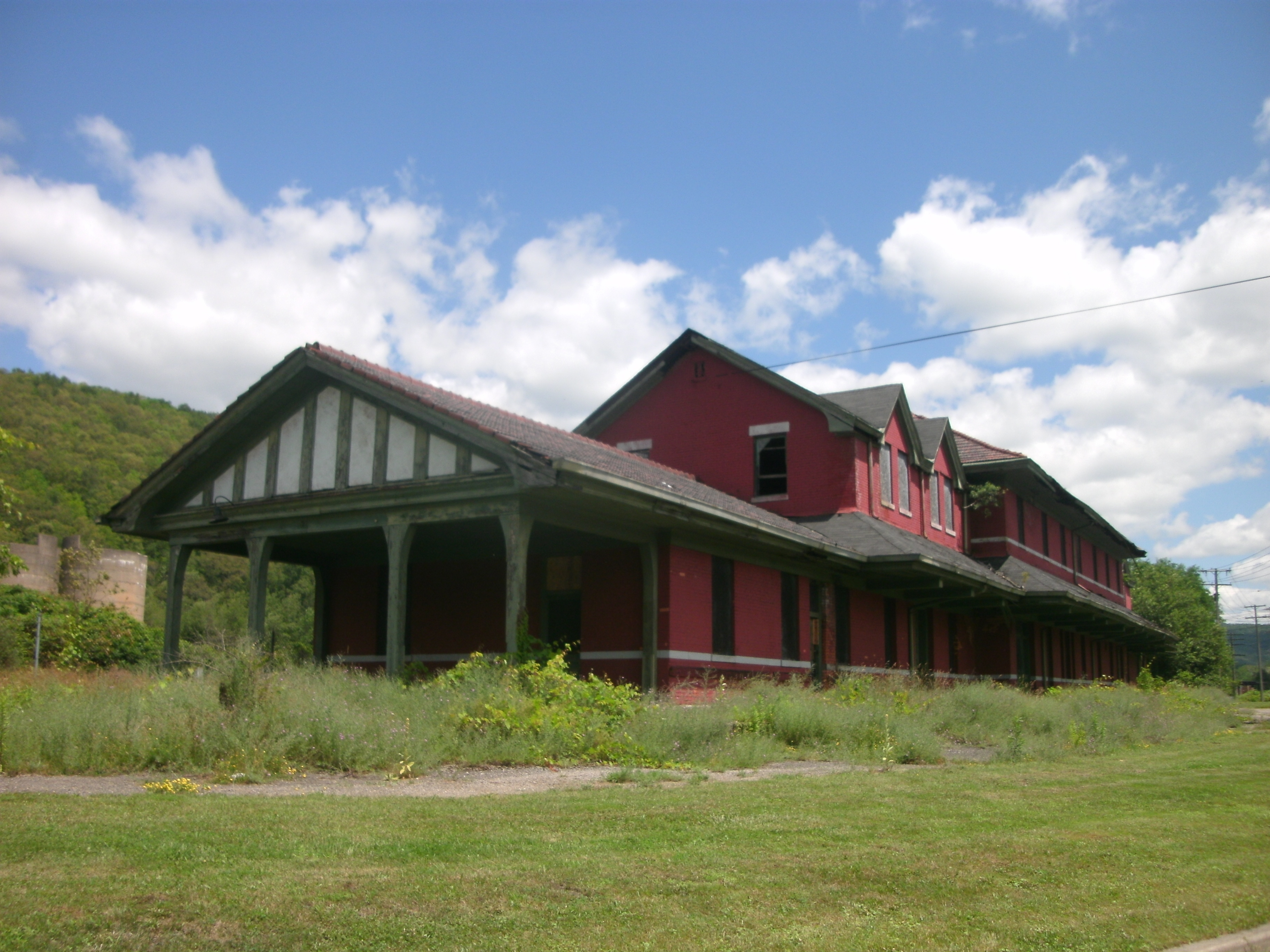
- The former Salamanca railroad depot in July 2013, a year before it burned down.

General information
- Location: 137 Main Street, Salamanca, New York, 14779
- Coordinates: 42.159901°N 78.715951°W
- Line: Main Line (Allegany Division / Meadville Division) Allegany Division (to Dunkirk)
- Platforms: 1 side platform
- Tracks: 2

Other information
- Station code: 4607

History
- Opened: May 14, 1851 (Erie Railroad); October 27, 1862 (Atlantic and Great Western Railroad)
- Closed: January 6, 1970 (Erie-Lackawanna Railroad)
- Rebuilt: 1872; October 21, 1902–January 5, 1904

Key dates
- July 29, 2014: 1904 station depot catches fire
- 2014: Depot demolished

Former services
Preceding station	Erie Railroad	Following station
Red House toward Chicago	Main Line	Killbuck toward Jersey City
West Salamanca toward Dunkirk	Allegany Division	Terminus
Location

Salamanca was a railroad station for the Erie Railroad in Salamanca, New York, United States. The station was located at 137 Main Street in Salamanca, across the track from the Buffalo, Rochester and Pittsburgh Railway depot. Located as the terminus of the Meadville Division of the Erie Railroad main line, Salamanca was considered part of the Allegany Division, which went between Dunkirk and Hornell.

Railroad service along the Erie Railroad was first established in 1851 as part of the original New York, Lake Erie and Western Railroad from Piermont to Dunkirk. The depot became a connection on October 27, 1862 to the Atlantic and Great Western Railway, which would later become part of the New York, Pennsylvania, and Ohio Railway (NYPANO), which would later be absorbed into the Erie Railroad. The depot survived the death of the Erie Railroad in October 17, 1960 as a passenger stop. Salamanca station's last train, the Lake Cities, stopped at 4:20 a.m. on January 6, 1970.

The depot survived for 44 more years, and several fires, before being burned down completely on July 30, 2014. The building was a total loss. A juvenile was charged in August with arson for setting the depot aflame.

== Introduction of the railroad (1851–1863) ==
The Seneca Nation of Indians, in the middle of a political debacle after the Revolution of 1848, leased a right-of-way consisting of 145 acres (59 ha) to the New York and Erie Railroad for 11.66 miles (18.76 km) of railroad track through the modern Allegany Indian Reservation. This action, which normally required federal approval, was confirmed in 1850 by the New York State Legislature instead. The new railroad was created in 1832 and help expand southwestern New York and sustain the Seneca for years to come. In April 1851, the final spike was nailed down at Cuba and the railroad opened on May 14.

On August 2, 1863, 23.85 acres (9.65 ha) was leased to the Erie at a cost of $2,385 (1863 USD) for the "construction, occupancy and maintenance" of its rail activities. This second deal was the initiative that brought the railroad's connection to the Atlantic and Great Western Railroad. The Atlantic and Great Western Railroad was constructed through Salamanca in April 1860. The railroad was Jamestown in September 1860. The tracks were extended to Corry, Pennsylvania by May 15, 1861. However, the money on the railroad had been exhausted and after oil was found, the Erie Railroad was able to it serviced down to New York City.

== First two depots and yard (1862–1904) ==
The name of the station is after José de Salamanca, a Spanish banker who was traveling on an inspection trip for the Atlantic and Great Western Railroad in 1862. The location, known as Bucktooth since November 1854, when it forked off from Little Valley, was renamed in his honor on April 17, 1862. The former railroad station in Salamanca was constructed in 1862 about 1 mile (1.6 km) west of the location of the final depot in downtown. In 1867, the depot was moved eastward to Hemlock Crossing (later known as just Crossing). The depot was of wooden construction and known locally as "The Old Ark."

The wooden depot was quickly outgrown for its design and plans were laid out to replace the structure with a station more suitable for its purpose. The new depot was completed in 1872 and constructed of iron rather than wood. This new depot was 420 feet (130 m) long and 14 feet (4.3 m) wide. The roof was made of corrugated steel. The depot was constructed with a Wells Fargo office and freight room at the eastern end, a new restaurant and saloon, restrooms, ticket office and a baggage room. Closer to the western end of the depot was the telegraph office, conductor's register room and an office for a yard. The western end also had an "immigrant room". The station design also contained a tower at the eastern end which contained a reading room for railroad workers and one at the western end which was a car record office.

The depot, considered in 1872 as excellent at its time for utility and convenience, became extremely out of date in thirty years. The depot was noted as the "Salamanca Windsplitter" because of its position and as the "Canvas Top Depot" due to the leaky roof it contained. The corrugated steel roof had worn through and covered with an oiled canvas that was no improvement after it wore out. The roof was so bad that the clerks had to protect their tickets with umbrellas and passengers looked for a new place to get shelter.

In 1864, construction of the yard in Salamanca began with the foundation. Through the next year, there was an 11-stall engine shop, machine shop, blacksmith shop, tank house and freight house under construction. These were all completed by 1865 because of the new connection of the New York and Lake Erie and the A&GW. This was completed along with the construction of shops at Susquehanna, Pennsylvania. By 1883, the Atlantic and Great Western and become the New York, Pennsylvania and Ohio Railroad and maintained a separate yard from the Erie Railroad. which maintained a majority of the facilities. However, the yards in Salamanca was never more than a repair center, even after the merge. In 1902, the Erie installed a 65 feet (20 m) turntable, but this had to be replaced quickly with one of 80 feet (24 m) diameter.

== Third depot (1904–2013) ==
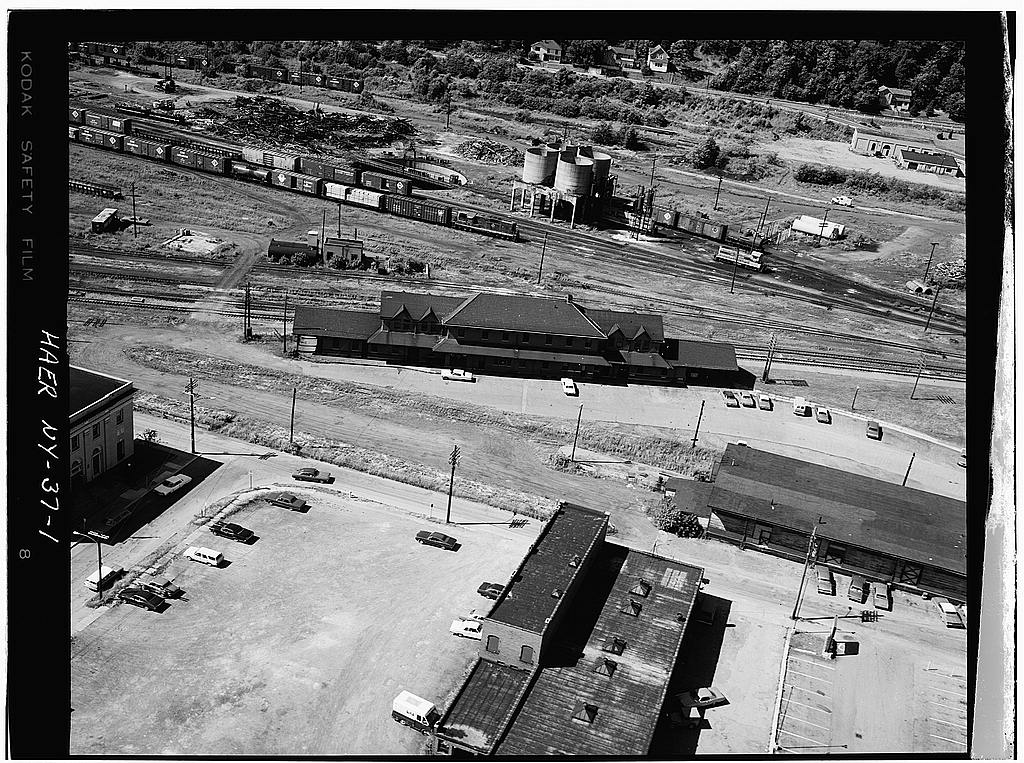
The Salamanca station and yard in 1977

In 1902, the Erie Railroad came up with plans to replace the Windsplitter depot, constructed in 1872. In October 1902, the contract for the new depot was awarded to the Olean Supply Company. The new station was designed to be 216 feet (66 m) with a second story on the top of the depot. This station in Salamanca would be symmetrical with the two dormers on the end of the upper floors. It was suggested by the Historic American Engineering Record that the depot was similar to the one at Hornell, New York. The depot was opened on January 5, 1904, with practically the entire city of Salamanca appearing for its opening ceremony. The new depot was constructed by the Olean Supply Company for the cost of $35,000 (1904 USD). The station was supposed to cost $15,000 originally. The new depot contained the offices for the Meadville Division of the Erie Railroad, dispatchers and the Corps of Engineers department aside of its basic utilities of passengers, baggage and mail delivery. The former station depot was demolished in 1907.

Service to Salamanca in 1909 consisted of 23 trains per day, serving Dunkirk, New York, Marion, Ohio, Chicago, Illinois, Bradford, Pennsylvania and Jersey City, New Jersey via different routes. Service on the branch to Bradford was replaced with bus and taxicab service on September 29, 1935. The service to Dunkirk was reduced to a mixed train on November 27, 1938, until being eliminated in November 1941.

Presidents Theodore Roosevelt and Franklin Delano Roosevelt both made campaign stops at Salamanca. In the early 1940s, when the New York Yankees were delayed by train heading out to Cleveland, Ohio for a game against the Cleveland Indians, they stopped at the station to stay at the nearby Dudley Hotel.

The turntable in the Salamanca yard was replaced once again in 1945 because the S-class locomotives were larger and assigned to the Allegany Division. The new turntable was 105 feet (32 m) in diameter to handle the larger equipment and was installed in the span of three days in October. The process required two cranes to lift the new table into place, one from Salamanca and another from Port Jervis, New York. With the upgrades, the Salamanca yard also managed to be able to work with more modern equipment, even though their use was minimal at most.

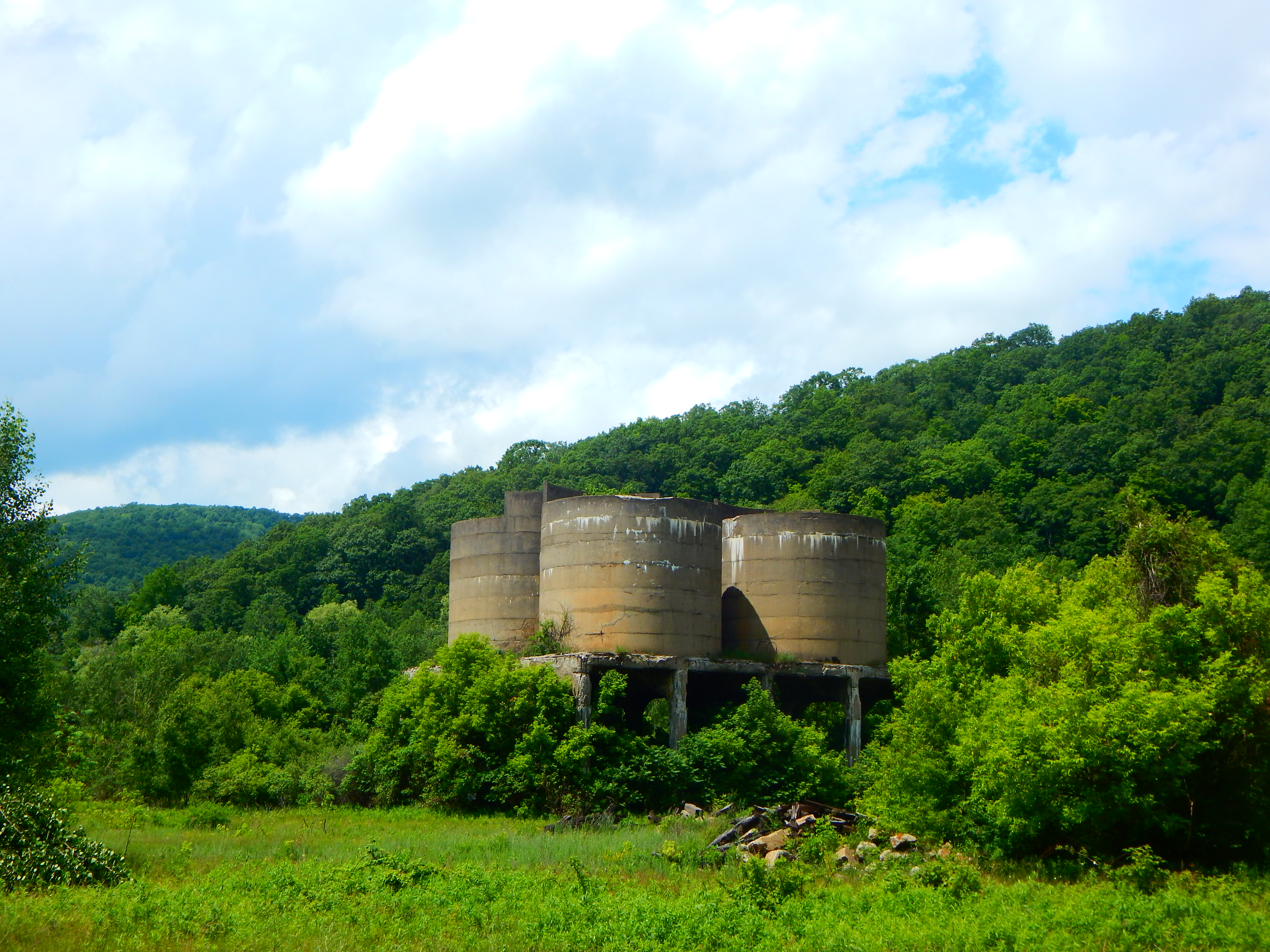
The former fueling towers at Salamanca in 2015

The station was remodeled by the Erie in 1948, and during the 1950s, around 90 people were employed at the Salamanca depot and yards. With the Erie Railroad and Delaware, Lackawanna and Western Railroad merging on October 17, 1960, the station came under the ownership of the newly formed Erie-Lackawanna Railway. However, passenger service at Salamanca continued to dwindle, and when the merge occurred, there were only seven trains serving the Salamanca depot: the Erie-Lackawanna Limited, the Pacific & Atlantic Express, and the Lake Cities. On September 29, 1963, the Erie-Lackawanna Limited was eliminated in favor of extending the famous Phoebe Snow to Dearborn station in Chicago, Illinois. On August 1, 1965, the Atlantic Express and Pacific Express were both terminated, leaving Salamanca with just four passenger trains daily, the Phoebe Snow and The World's Fair (a temporarily renamed Lake Cities). On October 31, 1965, the train was renamed back to the Lake Cities, and on November 28, 1966, the Phoebe Snow was discontinued.

In June 1969, the Erie Lackawanna petitioned the Interstate Commerce Commission (ICC) to discontinue the Lake Cities, which had been producing deficits of at least $500,000. Reluctantly, the ICC approved by the law discontinuance but pressured the Erie Lackawanna to do the best they could to keep their last intercity passenger train. Although service could have been terminated on December 30, 1969, the service continued through into 1970. Opponents tried a last minute stay on the decision by approaching a federal court in Columbus, Ohio, however, this was denied, as well a protest to Potter Stewart, a justice of the Supreme Court of the United States. The final runs through Salamanca of the Lake Cities occurred on January 6, 1970. The mayor of Salamanca, his wife and the city clerk, along with several officials of Cattaraugus County were on the final train.

In 1971, the Erie Railroad demolished the wooden roundhouse at Salamanca, and the only structures remaining in the yard were the former fueling towers and the turntable. The depot at Salamanca remained into 1977, being used as offices for the Consolidated Rail Corporation (Conrail) and as a diesel maintenance facility. In the late 1970s, the depot became vacant, and although plans to make it part of a museum and park by 1983 were proposed in 1982, they fell flat. The station caught fire in January 1982 and saved from demolition by Conrail. The city struck a deal in April 1983 to purchase the depot from Conrail for $25,000. The depot, along with the nearby Buffalo, Rochester and Pittsburgh Railroad depot acquired in 1986 by the Salamanca Industrial Development Agency, but in 1990, the building was turned over to the Seneca Nation. In the mid-1980s, a fire burned out much of the second floor of the building. The rail yard in Salamanca remained in service until the mid-1990s.

== Fire and demolition ==
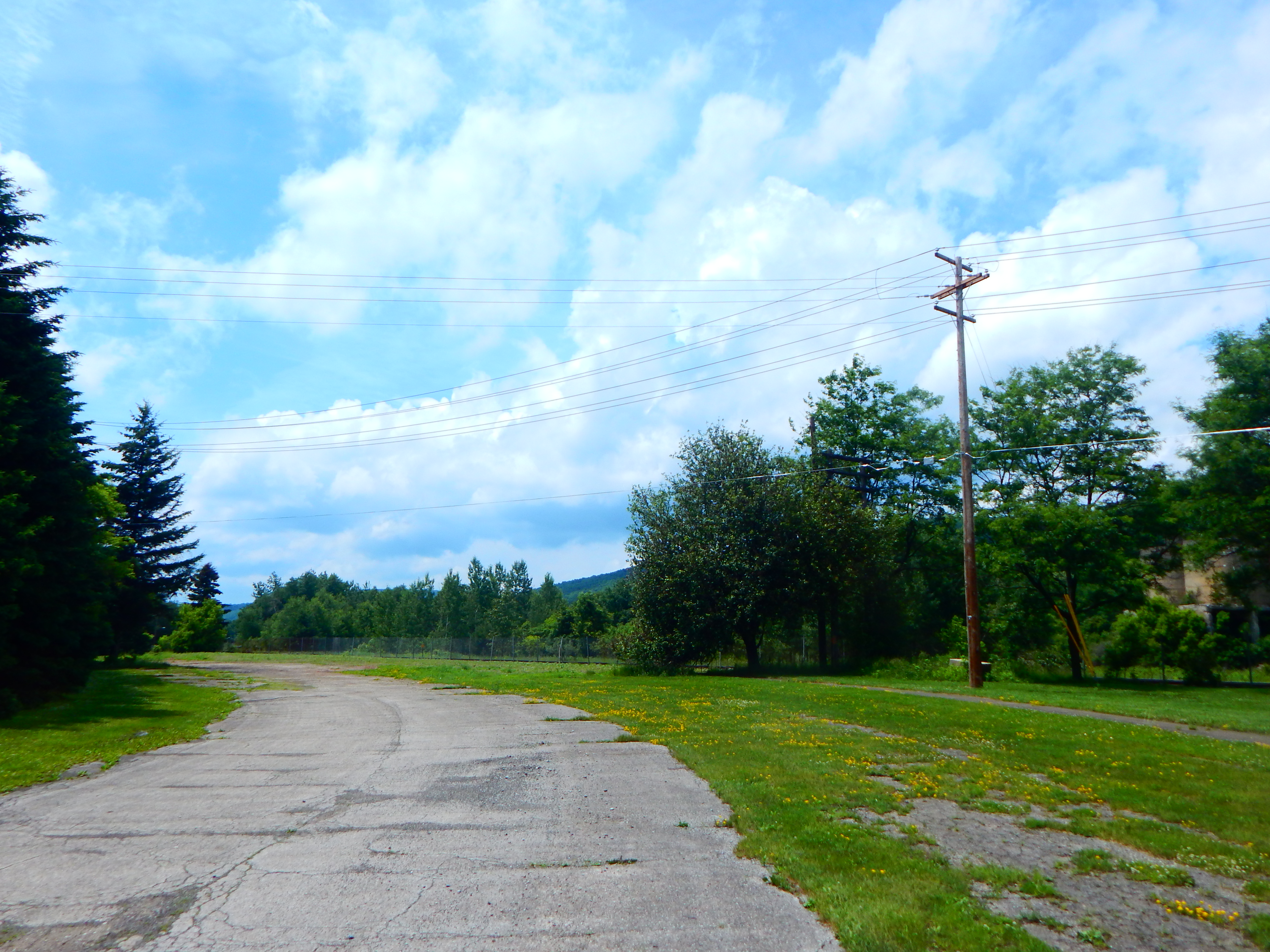
The site of the Salamanca depot in June 2015, 11 months after the fire

The station depot at Salamanca caught fire in the early afternoon of July 29, 2014. Although the fire department was alerted by 2:30 p.m. of the fire, the depot burned for four hours before coming under control. Within a minute of the department getting there, the second story of the depot burst into flames. The damage had taken out the entire roof and a majority of the second floor, which saw its brick structure line collapse. Severe damage had also been done to the canopy over the former platform location and in the former driveway. Fallen bricks and charred beams were strewn across the driveway as well. The fire department considered the job a success, despite the fact that many nearby volunteer fire companies were hard to contact due to most being at work on a Tuesday afternoon. The Salamanca Fire Department remained at the depot until 1^ a.m. the next morning to make sure that any hot spots remaining were taken care of.

Declared a total loss, the fire and police department considered the fire suspicious as the depot had no power running and any other form of accidental causes. The department stated that they had information because youths had been seen running in, out and around of the building for the 24 hours prior to the fire. The fire sped up a process by the city of Salamanca, who has considering demolishing the building within two to three months of the fire. Salamanca Mayor Carmen Vecchiarella noted that he had met with members of the Seneca Nation earlier in the month to discuss demolition of the Nation owned structure, which kept the building secure. The Salamanca Police Department noted that the station depot was secure and never been a source of trouble for the patrol team, unlike that of the former Fancher Furniture Company structure on Rochester Street which burned due to arson in 2010.

On August 5, 2014, suspects were identified until the arson investigation. The suspects were being questioned, but declined to mention their age, identity or quantity. The next day, Paul Myers, the chief of the Police Department, noted that they would be making arrests soon in connection with the arson. On August 8, charges were processed against a 14-year-old of second-degree criminal mischief, third-degree burglary, second-degree reckless endangerment and fourth-degree arson for his actions. Chief Myers also noted that day the fire began in a barrel inside the depot and after the investigation, only one person was charged.

== Bibliography ==
- Annual Report of the Commissioner of Railroads and Telegraphs. Cincinnati, Ohio: Ohio Commissioner of Railroads and Telegraphs. 1874.
- Churella, Albert J. (2012). The Pennsylvania Railroad, Volume 1: Building an Empire, 1846–1917. Philadelphia, Pennsylvania: University of Pennsylvania Press. ISBN 9780812207620.
- Grant, H. Roger (1994). Erie Lackawanna: The Death of an American Railroad, 1938–1992. Palo Alto, California: Stanford University Press. ISBN 9780804727983.
- Hauptman, Laurence M. (1993). The Iroquois in the Civil War: From Battlefield to Reservation. Syracuse, New York: Syracuse University Press. ISBN 9780815602729.
- Sanders, Craig (2003). Limiteds, Locals, and Expresses in Indiana, 1838–1971. Bloomington, Indiana: Indiana University Press. ISBN 9780253342164.
- Seely, Bruce (1977). Erie Railway Survey (PDF). Washington D.C.: Historic American Engineering Record of the Library of Congress.
