= Steamburg station =

Erie Railroad station in New York

Steamburg
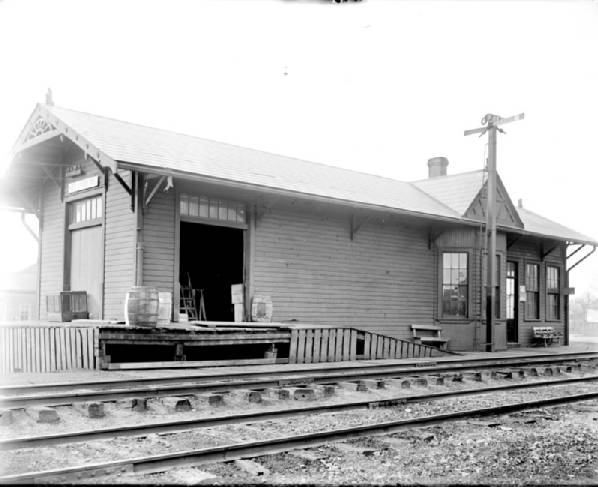
- The railroad station in Steamburg, NY circa 1900.

General information
- Location: Steamburg, NY
- Coordinates: 42.110781°N 78.901501°W
- Owner: Atlantic and Great Western Railroad (1864–1880) New York, Pennsylvania and Ohio Railroad (1880–1905) Erie Railroad (1905–1960) Erie Lackawanna Railroad (1960–1976) Conrail (1976–1977)
- Line: Main Line
- Platforms: 1 side platform
- Tracks: 2

Other information
- Station code: 5005

History
- Electrified: Not electrified

Former services
Preceding station	Erie Railroad	Following station
Randolph toward Chicago	Main Line	Red House toward Jersey City
Location

Steamburg was a passenger and freight station for the Erie Railroad in the hamlet of Steamburg in Cattaraugus County, New York.

The station was located 425.6 miles (684.9 km) from New York and 572.9 miles (922.0 km) from Chicago.

== Station layout and design ==
The passenger station at was located on the south side of the tracks just east of NE May Road (formerly Depot Street). There were sidings off the main line in Steamburg for a milk plant on the south side of the tracks to the east of the station and a feed mill on the north side of the tracks

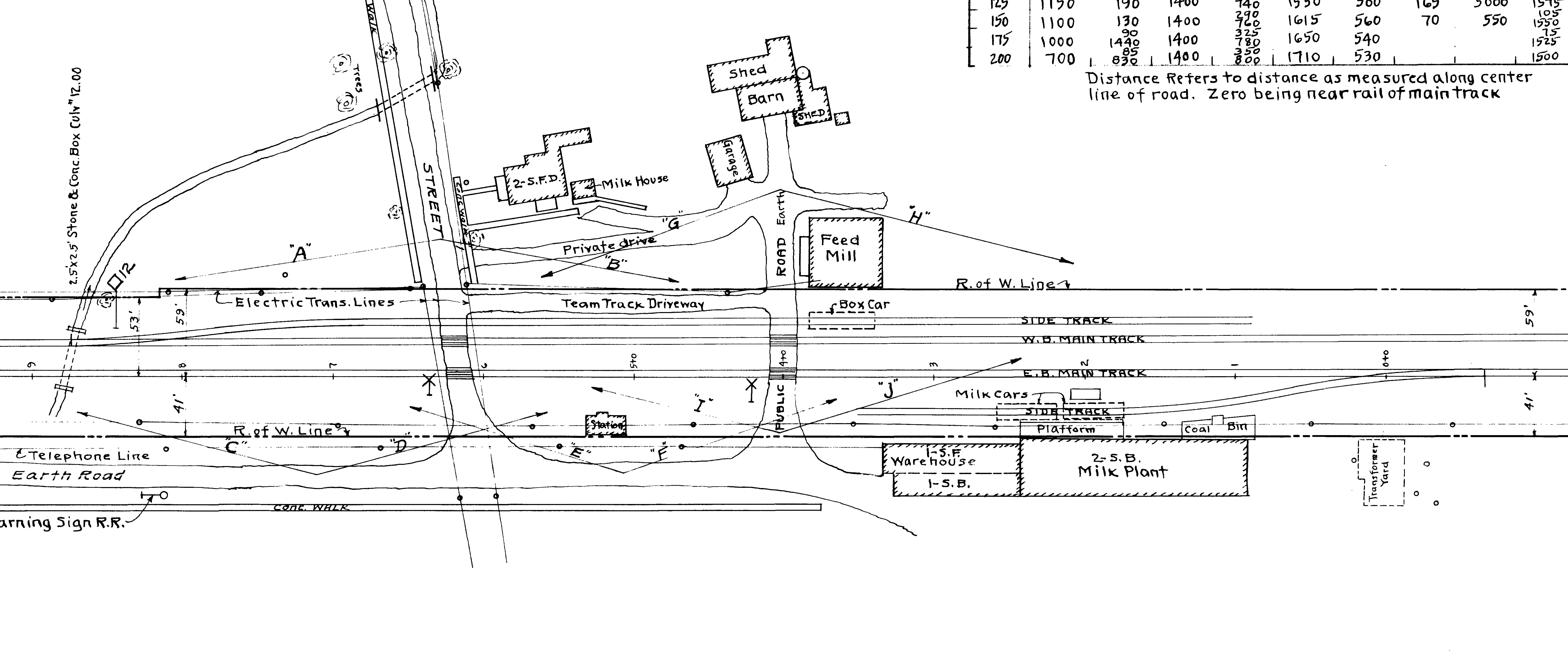
1948 plan of the Steamburg station area

== History ==
It is unclear when the station was originally constructed, but an 1870 inventory of the Atlantic and Great Western Railway listed the facilities in Steamburg as:

- "Freight and Passenger Depot, 16x60, rough boards and shingle roof, poor
- Tank house, good, has no tubs or water supply
- Wood-shed, 100x30, board roof, poor
- Hand-car house, 10x12, frame, painted and good"

The Steamburg station was not served by many trains. In the 1920s only one long-distance train in each direction serviced the station, though there may have been local trains who also stopped. By the early 1930s Steamburg was a flag stop where trains only stopped if there were passengers to board or discharge. By December 1935 it no longer appeared as a station on Erie Railroad passenger timetables.

On February 6, 1888, Steamburg was the site of a collision between a passenger and freight train that killed multiple people and was reported in the national press, including the New York Times.

== Gallery ==
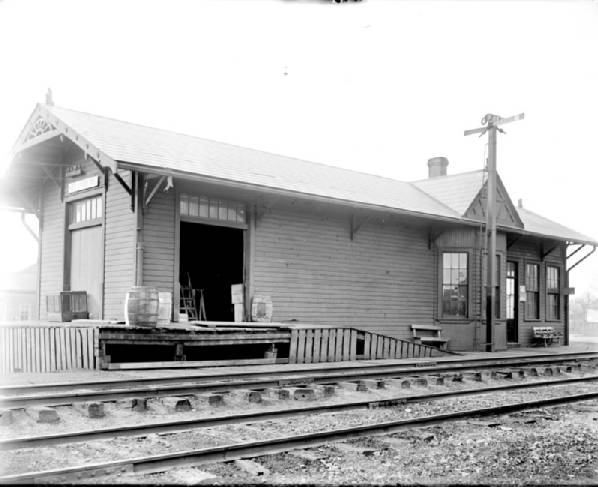

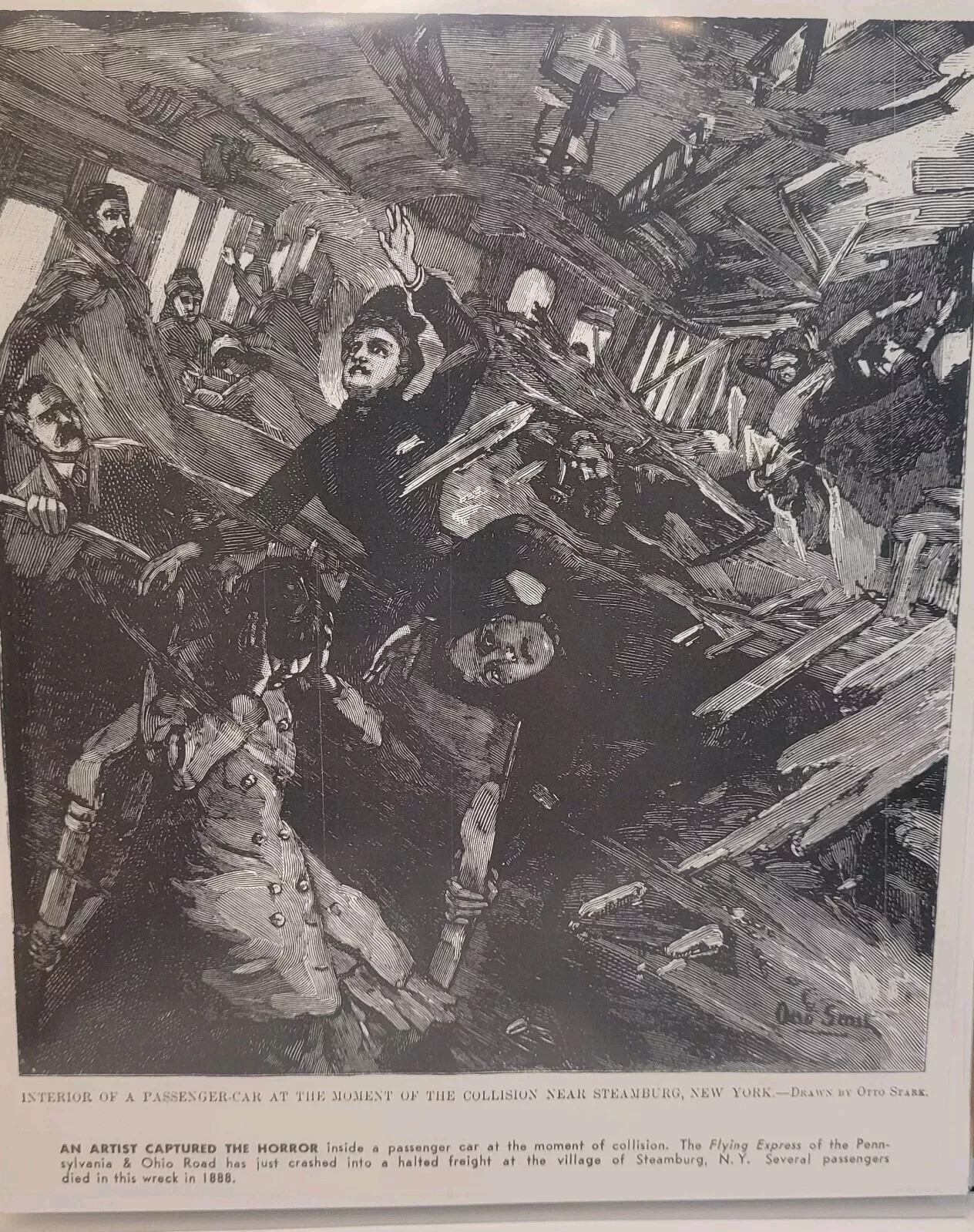

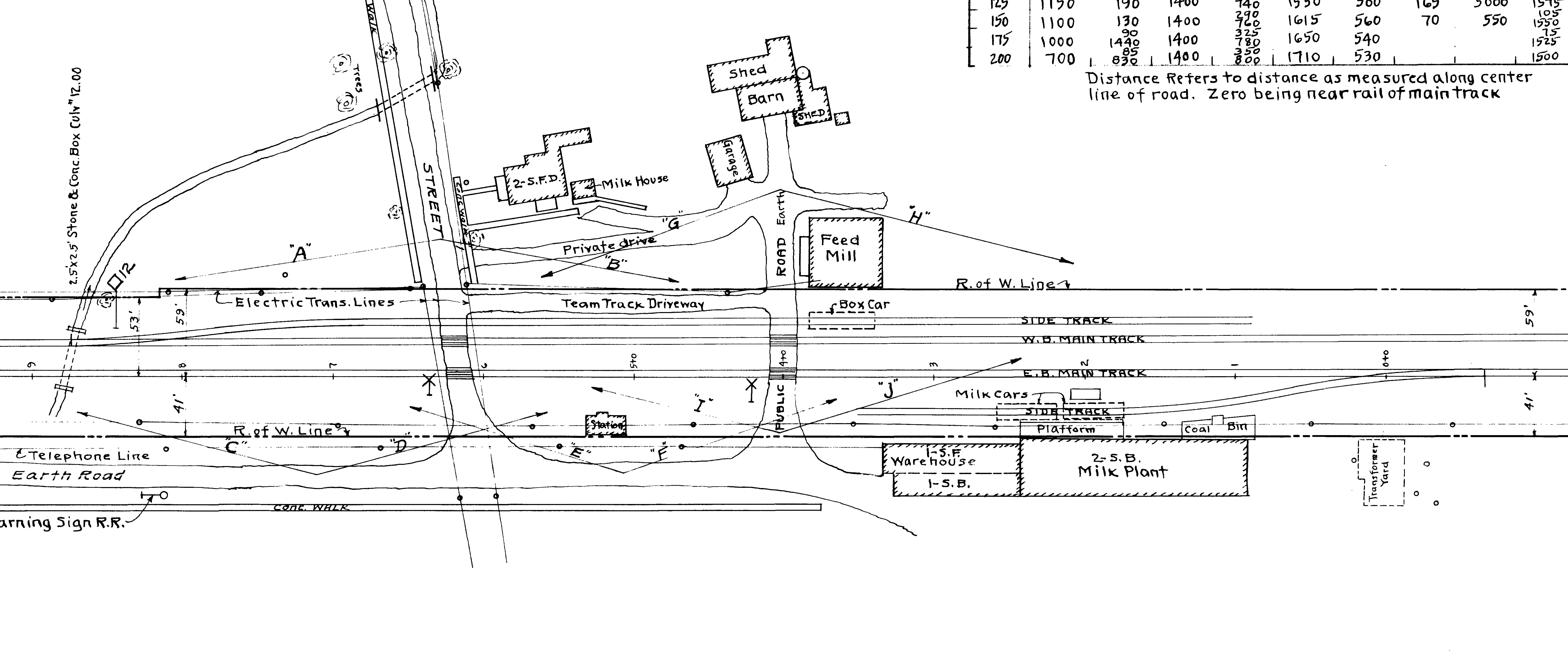
