= Randolph station (Erie Railroad) =

Erie Railroad station in New York

Randolph
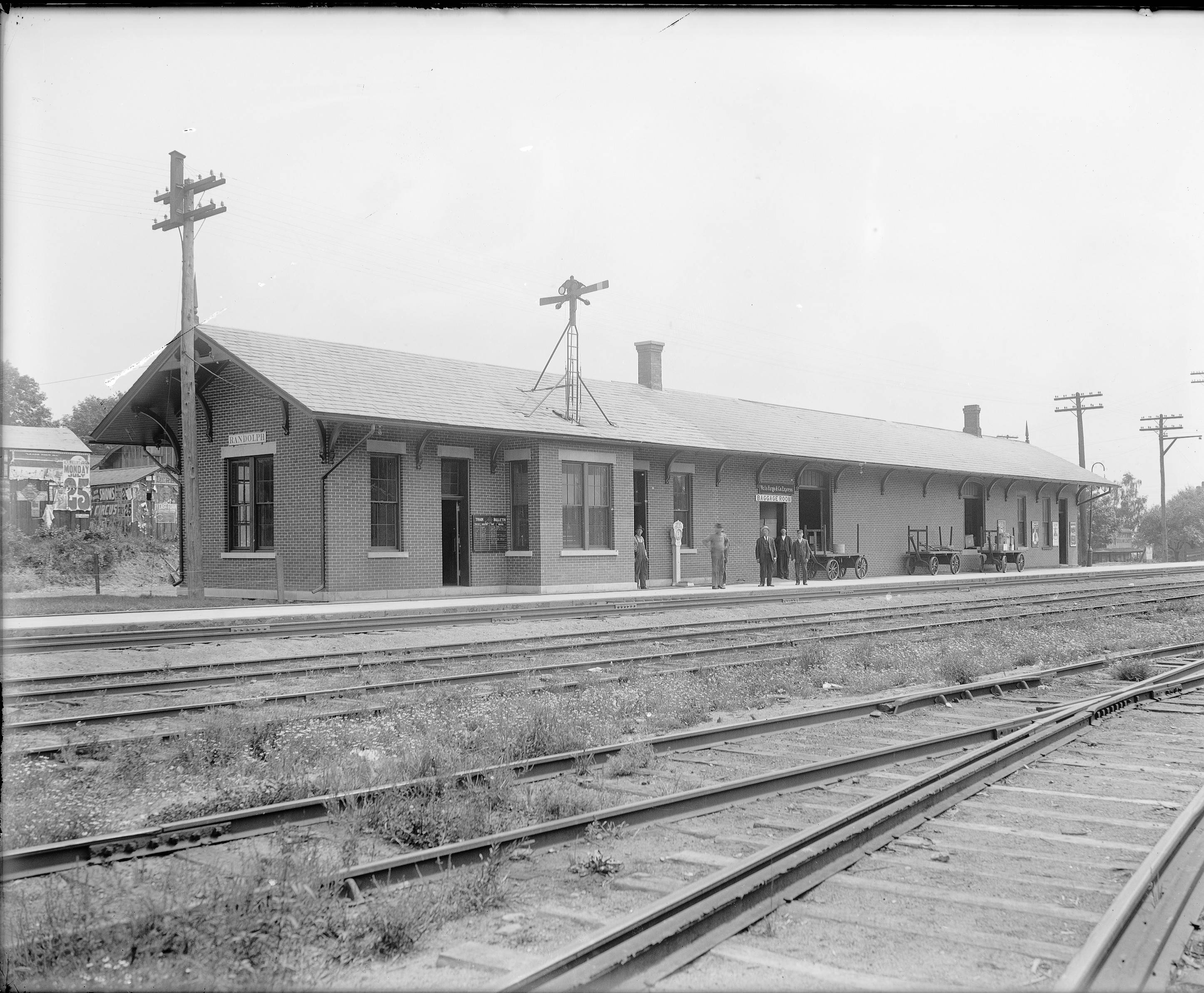
- The railroad station in Randolph, NY circa 1900.

General information
- Location: Main Street, Randolph, New York 14772
- Coordinates: 42.1596°N 78.9832°W
- Owner: Atlantic and Great Western Railroad (1864–1880) New York, Pennsylvania and Ohio Railroad (1880–1905) Erie Railroad (1905–1960) Erie Lackawanna Railroad (1960–1976) Conrail (1976–1977)
- Line: Main Line
- Platforms: 1 side platform
- Tracks: 1

Other information
- Station code: 5007

History
- Opened: 1864; 162 years ago
- Electrified: Not electrified

Former services
Preceding station	Erie Railroad	Following station
Kennedy toward Chicago	Main Line	Steamburg toward Jersey City
Location

Randolph was a passenger and freight station for the Erie Railroad in the village of Randolph in Cattaraugus County, New York.

The station was located 431.2 miles (693.9 km) from New York and 567.3 miles (913.0 km) from Chicago.

== Station layout and design ==
The passenger station at was located on the east side of the tracks between Main Street and Depot Street (now Washington Street). The station had a platform (originally wood, later concrete) along the main line track.

Unlike most of the Erie mainline, which had two tracks, the section through Randolph was single-tracked for ten miles between RH Tower to the east and Waterboro to the west. The second track visible on the photos of the station was a siding that was used to load lumber, deliver coal, and to service the feed mill across the tracks from the station. There was another siding that ran behind the station that was used to load and unload freight cars and to service the furniture factory on the opposite side of Main Street from the station.

Maps until 1891 showed a water tank to refill locomotives at the east (Depot Street) end of the platform. The water tank does not appear in maps starting in 1897 and it is unclear when it was removed.

== History ==
The Randolph station was built soon after the Atlantic and Great Western Railroad reached the village. In the First Annual Report of the Atlantic and Great Western Railway in 1864, William Reynolds, president of the Atlantic and Great Western Railway stated: "Permanent passenger stations and freight-houses should be erected at Randolph and Jamestown, at which places the present temporary buildings are inadequate".

The Randolph station continued to operate after the Atlantic and Great Western became the New York, Pennsylvania and Ohio Railroad (NYPANO), the Erie Railroad, and the Erie Lackawanna Railroad.

Passenger service to Randolph was done primarily through local trains and only a few long-distance passenger trains stopped in Randolph. As of 1931, only two trains stopped each day, the westbound Lake Cities at 7:35 am and the eastbound Atlantic Express at 4:29 pm. Passengers going to or from Randolph on long-distance trains would travel to Jamestown or Salamanca as all long-distance trains stopped at those stations.

== Gallery ==
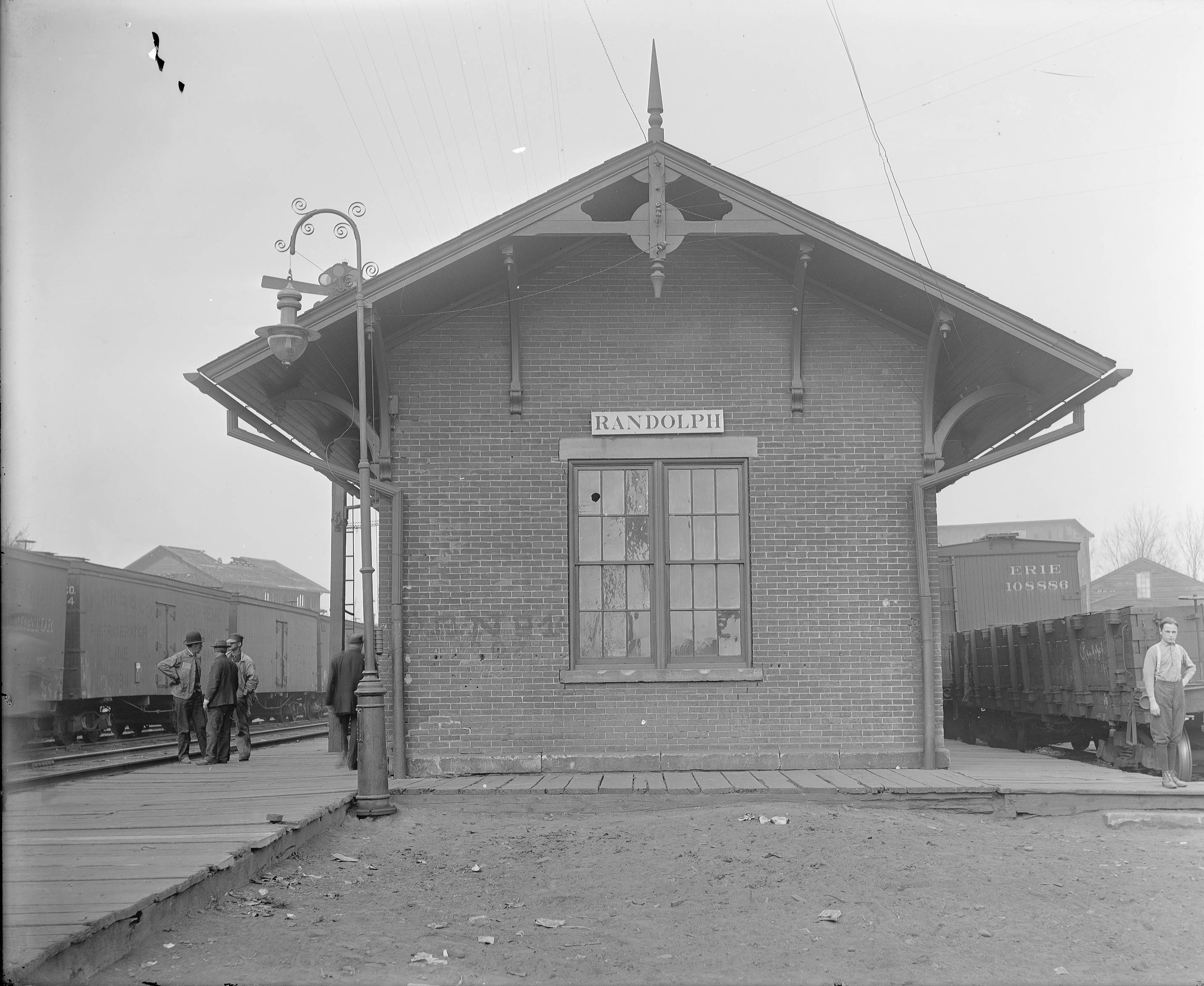
View of the Depot Street end of the station circa 1900

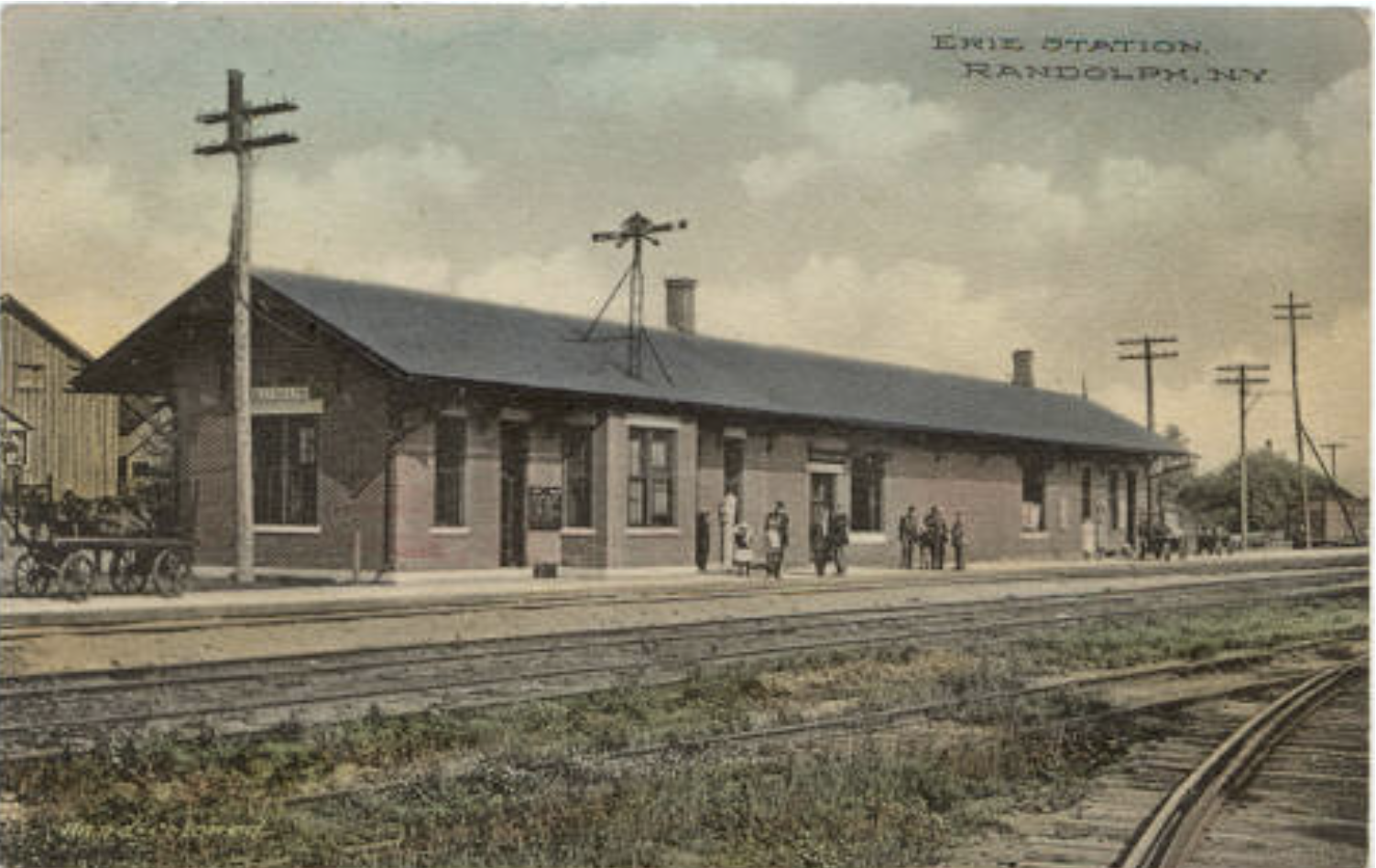
Postcard showing the station circa 1900–1907

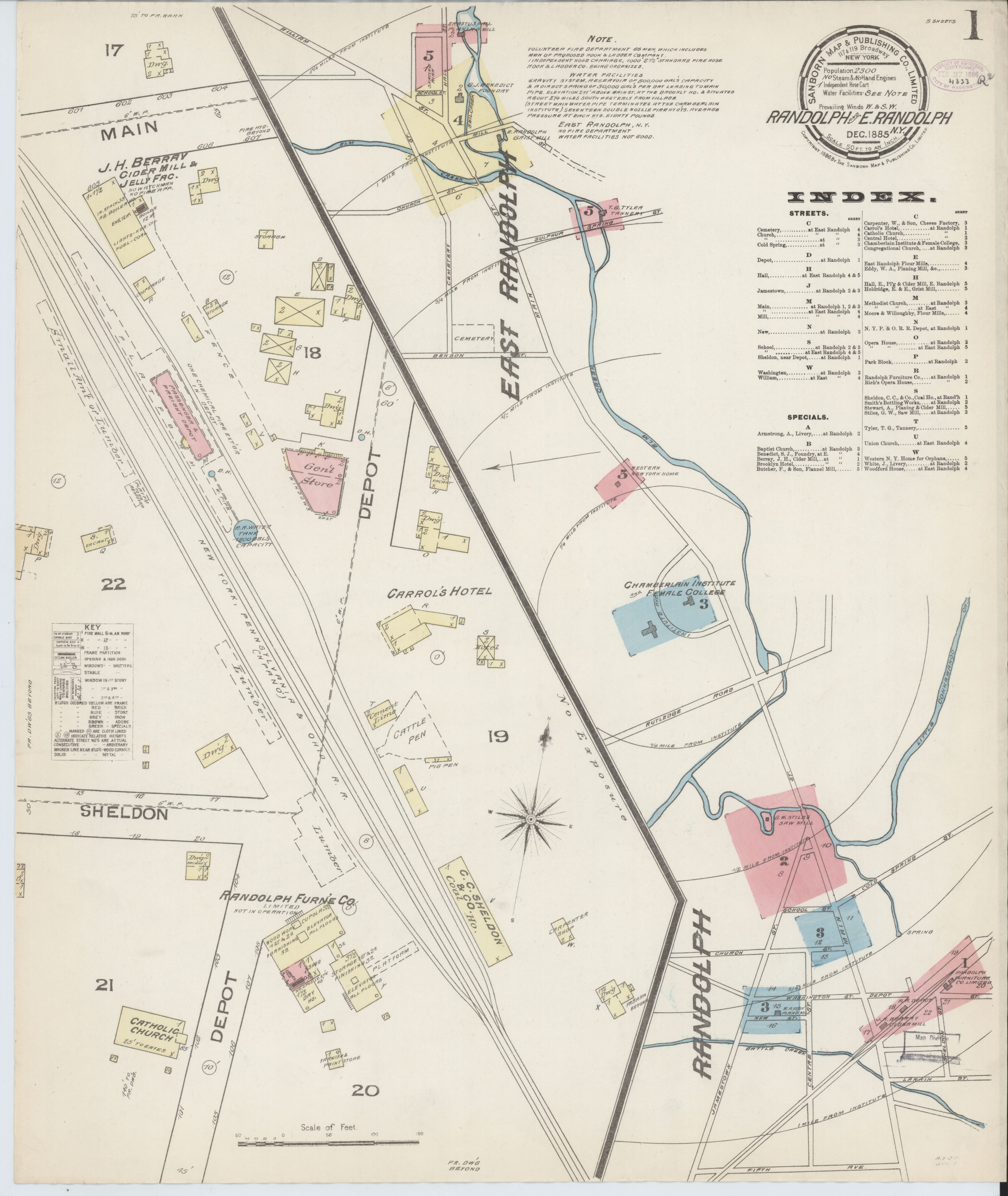
1885 map of the station area

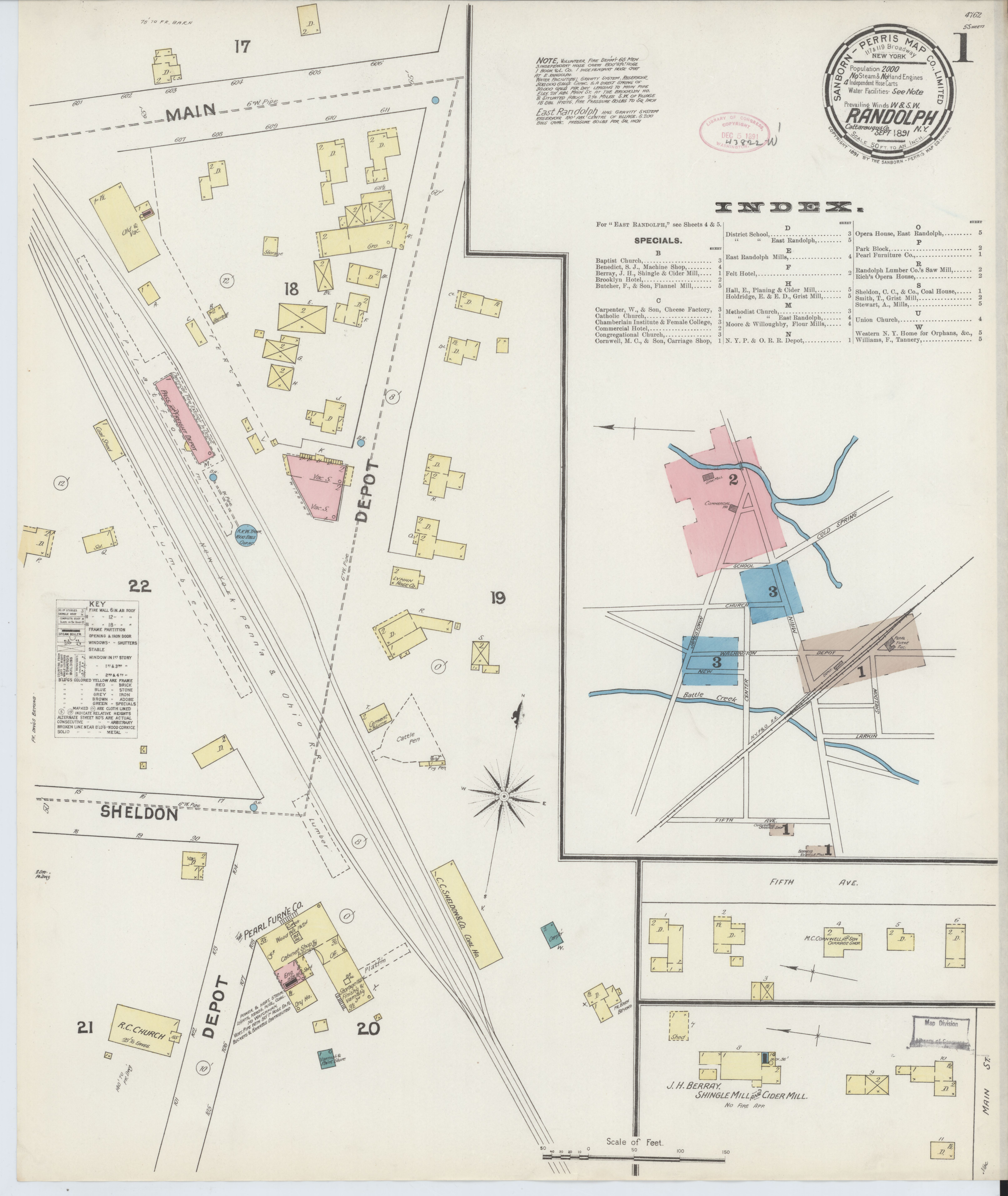
1891 map showing the station area

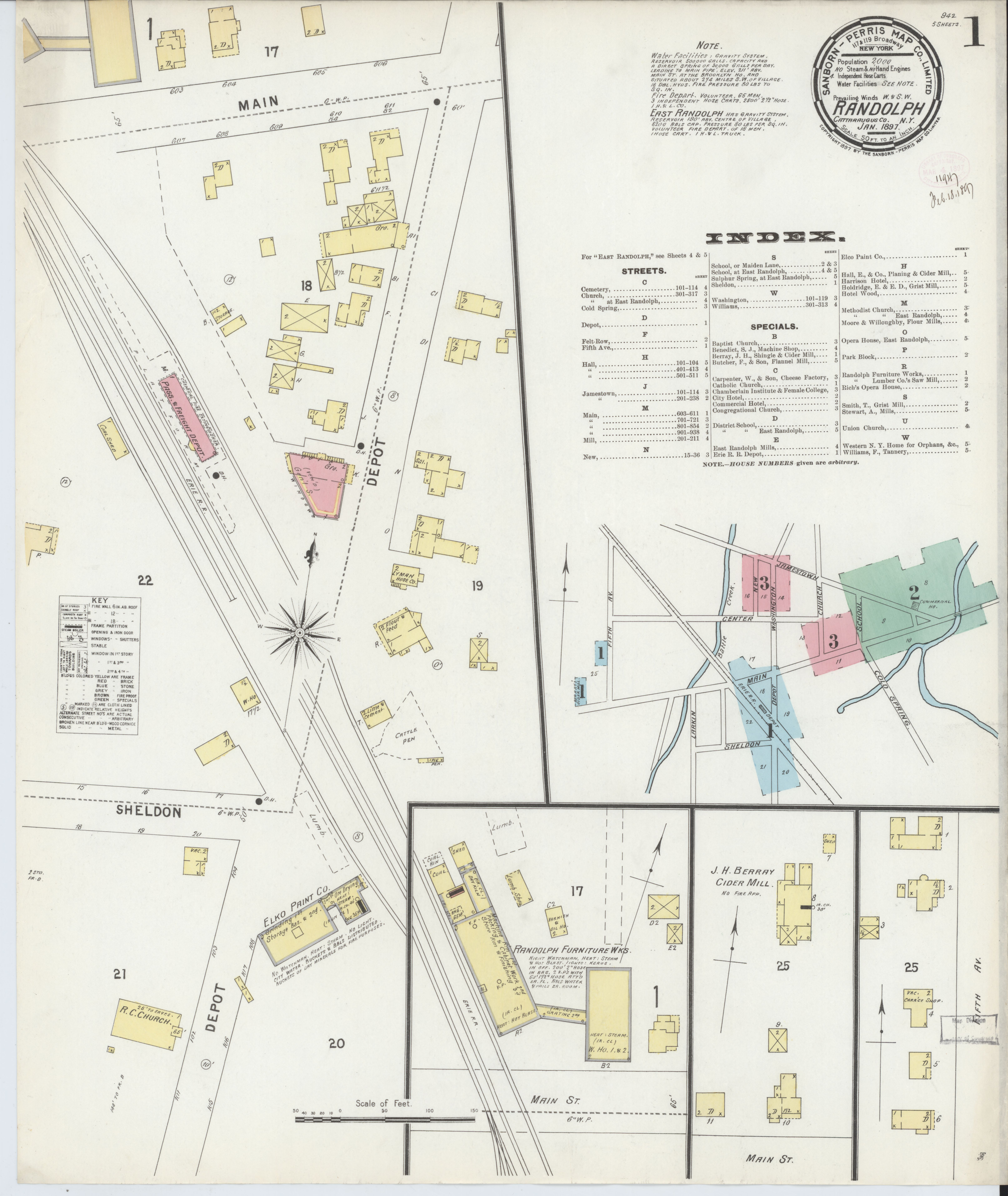
1897 map showing the station area
