= Warren station =

Warren station may refer to:

- Warren station (Erie Railroad), a former railroad station in Warren, Ohio
- Warren station (Pennsylvania Railroad), a former railroad station in Warren, Pennsylvania
- Warren Avenue station, a QLine streetcar stop in Detroit, Michigan
- Warren railway station, former railway station in Wirral, England
- Warren station (Illinois), a former railroad station in Warren, Illinois

== See also ==
- Warren (disambiguation)
- Warren Street station (disambiguation)
