= Corning station =

Corning
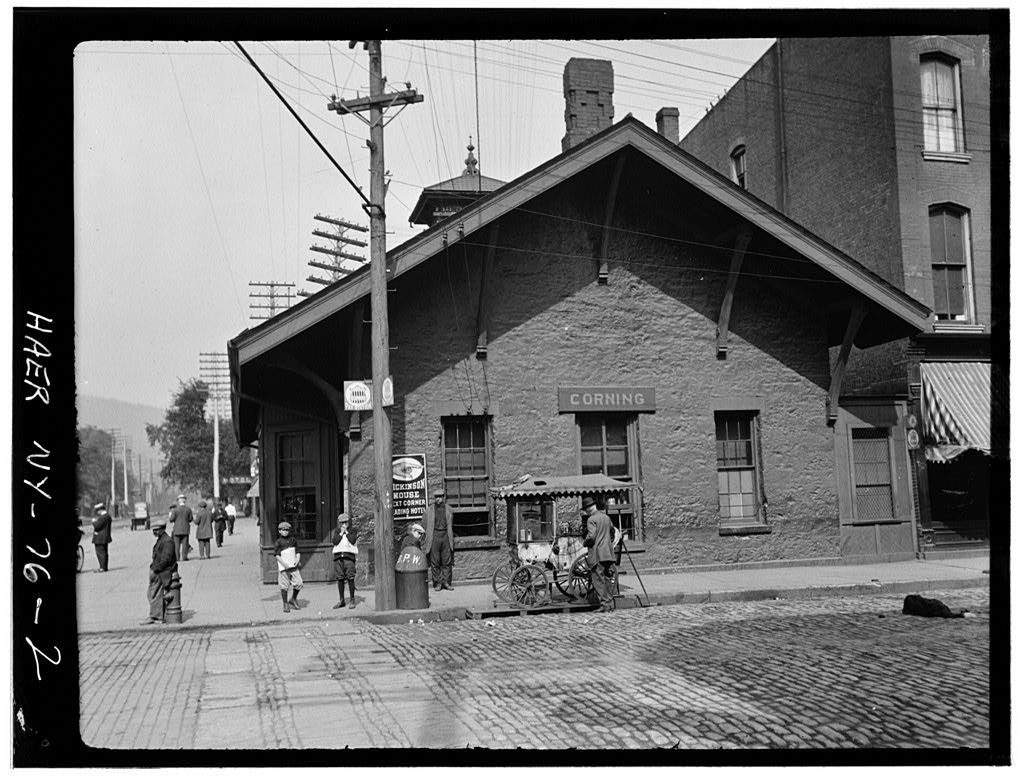
- The former Erie station in downtown Corning, 1900.

General information
- Location: Erie Avenue at Pine Street, Corning, Steuben County, New York 14830 (1851–1952); West Sycamore Street, Corning, New York 14830 (after 1952)
- Coordinates: 42°9′28″N 77°3′44″W
- Line: Main Line (Susquehanna Division)
- Platforms: 1 side platform
- Tracks: 2

Other information
- Station code: 3855

History
- Opened: January 1850
- Closed: January 6, 1970
- Rebuilt: November 21, 1952

Former services
Preceding station	Erie Railroad	Following station
Painted Post toward Chicago	Main Line	East Corning toward Jersey City
Location

Corning was a major station along the Erie Railroad, located on the Susquehanna Division of the main line. Located originally in downtown Corning, New York, the station first opened on the line in January 1850, with the completion of the New York and Erie Railroad from Piermont in Rockland County to Dunkirk in Chautauqua County. The first depot at Corning was built in 1861 and located at the intersection of Erie Avenue and Pine Street in Corning. (Erie Avenue is now Denison Parkway (NY 352).) The station lasted at this location until 1952, when construction of a new track bypass of Corning began. The newer depot opened on November 21, 1952. This new station was located at the junction of West Sycamore Street and North Bridge Street on the north side of Corning.

The station served in the 1960s as a junction on the Atlantic Express/Pacific Express, the Erie Limited, the Lake Cities to Chicago and the Phoebe Snow and the Owl to Buffalo. Until at least 1961, the station for Chicago trains was separate from the earlier Lackawanna station for Buffalo trains. However, in a consolidation and a rerouting, the Erie station took on the Buffalo-bound trains by 1963. Corning was also the terminus of the Erie Railroad's Rochester Division service to Avon in Livingston County. Passenger service along the Rochester Division ended on September 30, 1947 when train no. 468 arrived at Corning station. The last passenger train to use the Corning station was the eastbound Lake Cities, which made its final departure on January 6, 1970.

== Gallery ==
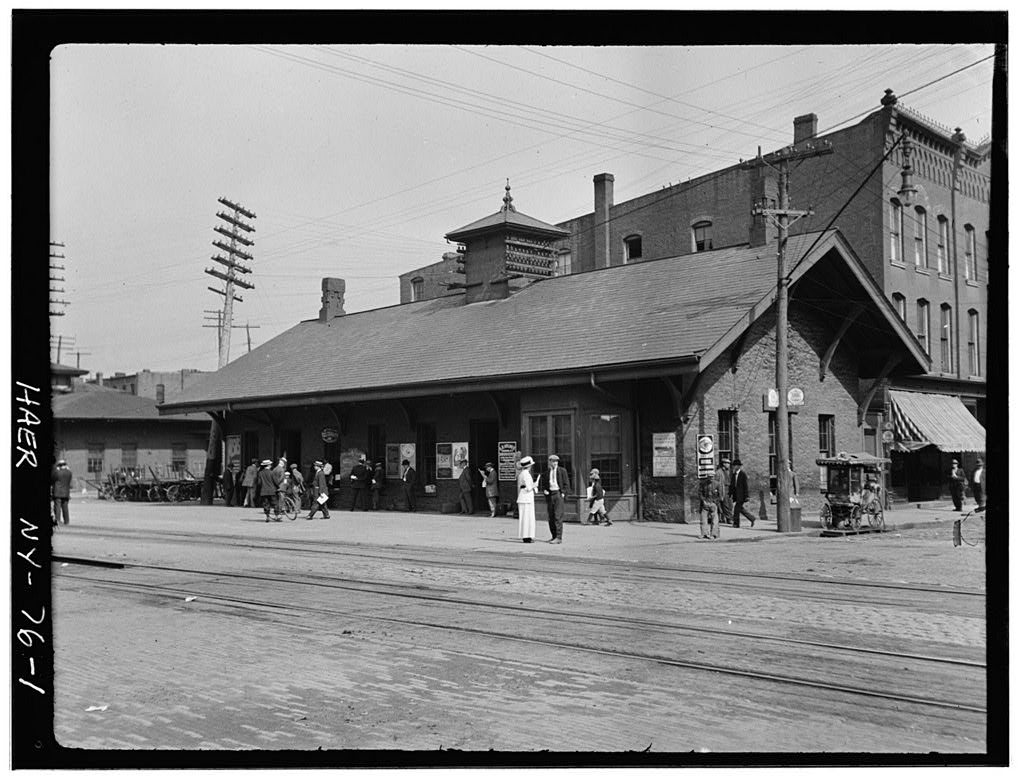
Corning station, ca. 1900

== Bibliography ==
- Yanosey, Robert (2006). Erie Railroad Facilities (In Color). Vol. 2. Scotch Plains, New Jersey: Morning Sun Books Inc. ISBN 1582481962.
