= Warren Street station =

Warren Street station may refer to:

- Warren Street tube station, a London Underground station on the Northern and Victoria lines
- Warren Street station (MBTA), a light rail station on the MBTA Green Line B branch in Boston
- Warren Street/NJIT station, an underground Newark Light Rail station
- Warren Street station (IRT Ninth Avenue Line), a former elevated New York City Subway station

== See also ==
- Warren Street
- Warren station (disambiguation)
- Warren Avenue station, a QLine streetcar stop in Detroit, Michigan
