= Aurora station (Ohio) =

Aurora
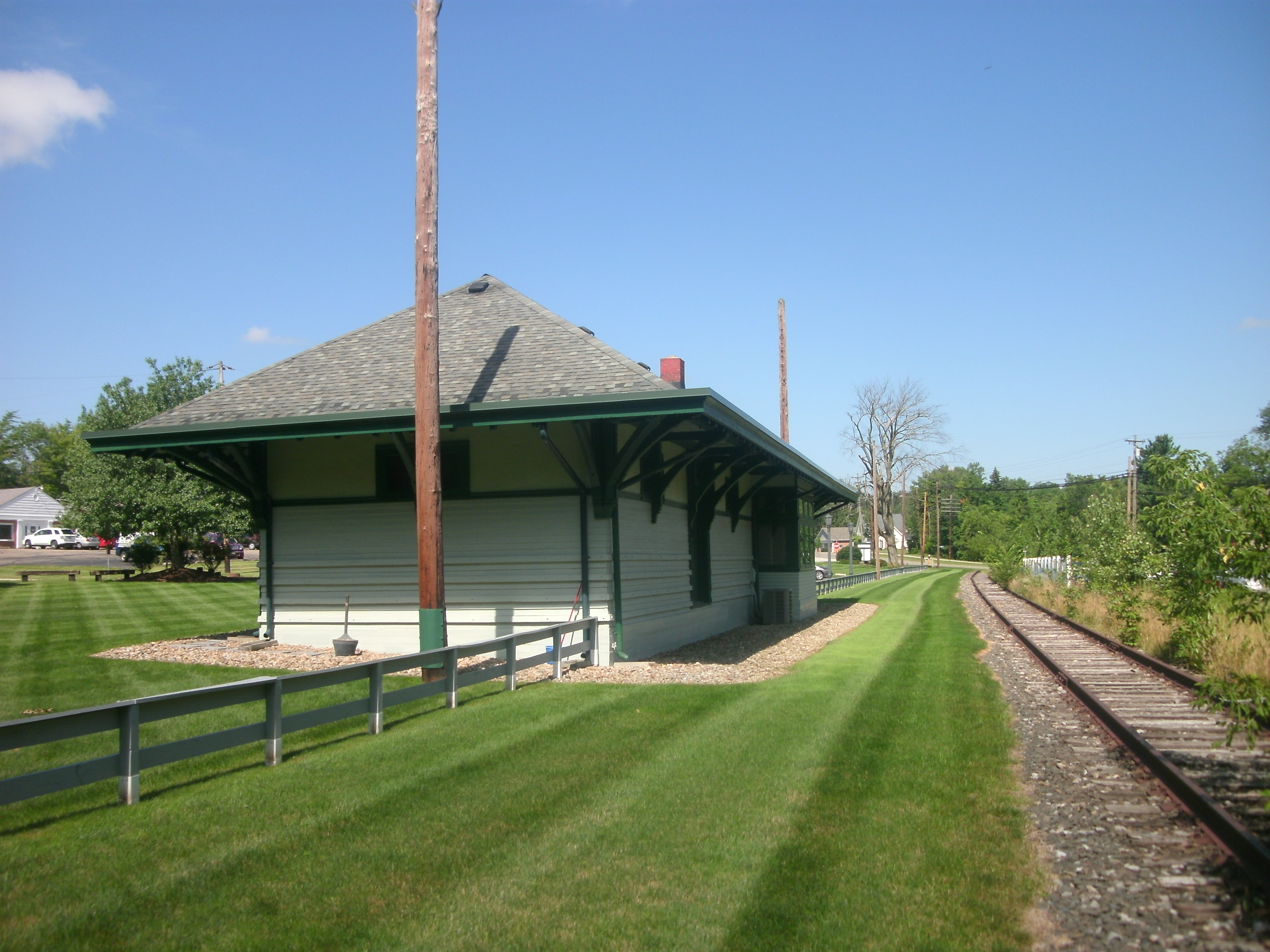
- The Aurora station depot in July 2013, paralleled by the abandoned tracks.

General information
- Location: 13 New Hudson Road (SR 82), Aurora, Ohio
- Line: Mahoning Division
- Platforms: 1 side platform
- Tracks: 1

Other information
- Station code: 5585

History
- Opened: 1872
- Closed: January 14, 1977
- Rebuilt: 1906

Former services
Preceding station	Erie Railroad	Following station
Geauga Lake toward Cleveland	Cleveland – Youngstown	Mantua toward Youngstown
- Aurora Train Station
- U.S. National Register of Historic Places
- Location within Ohio Location within the United States
- Location: 13 New Hudson Road; Aurora, Ohio
- Coordinates: 41°19′01″N 81°20′0″W
- Built: 1904
- Architectural style: Stick/eastlake
- NRHP reference No.: 86001131
- Added to NRHP: May 22, 1986
Location

Aurora is the former train station serving the residents of Aurora, Ohio, located within Portage County, Ohio, USA. The station was constructed in 1872 by the New York, Pennsylvania and Ohio Railroad, which had absorbed the former Cleveland and Mahoning Valley Railroad, which ran from Cleveland, Ohio to Leavittsburg, Ohio. The next station to the northwest was Geauga Lake, serving the Geauga Lake amusement park. The next station to the southeast was Mantua. The line was entirely acquired by the Erie Railroad in 1941 after dissolution of the New York, Pennsylvania and Ohio. The last train left Aurora station on January 14, 1977. After the line was abandoned, the rails were taken up. The station depot, one of three still standing along the branch (along with Solon and Mantua), was listed in the National Register of Historic Places on May 22, 1986.

== Bibliography ==
- Camp, Mark (2007). Images of Rail: Railroad Depots of Northeast Ohio. Charleston, South Carolina: Arcadia Publishing. ISBN 978-0-7385-5115-9.
