= Erie and New York City Railroad =

Former railroad in New York

The Erie and New York City Railroad was a railroad that operated in New York state.

Among the earliest supporters of the Erie and New York City Railroad were prominent Jamestown, New York residents who lobbied for the railroad to go through their town, but the route chosen by the railroad bypassed Jamestown by 35 miles in favor of Salamanca, Dayton, and Dunkirk.

After being snubbed by the New York and Erie, townspeople met on June 27, 1851, in Jamestown and on June 30, 1851, a petition for a charter for the Erie and New York City Railroad was published. The road was to be built from Salamanca, through Randolph, and Jamestown, and then proceeding south to the New York state border with Pennsylvania. Work began on the line began in Randolph on May 19, 1853, and was abandoned on January 5, 1855, for lack of funds.

On May 7, 1859, the Atlantic and Great Western Railroad in New York was chartered with William Reynolds as its president. One of the first actions of the A&GW was to purchase the Erie and New York City Railroad in 1860. According to the company's first annual report, the A&GW assumed $14,000 of 7 percent bonds upon the purchase of the Erie and New York City Railroad and received three locomotives, two passenger cars, and 40 freight cars from the contractors building the Erie and New York City.
