= Samuel Cochrane =

American railroad engineer

Samuel Cochrane (born November 1850, date of death unknown) was an American railroad engineer who, during the late 19th and early 20th centuries, was a locomotive engineer working the Erie-Meadville, Pennsylvania line later awarded the Order of the Red Spot.

Born to Cooper Samuel Cochrane Sr. in Rochester, New York, he attended school until the age of 13 when he left to become a clerk in a local wholesale liquor warehouse. He continue work there throughout his teenage years until 1870 when he accepted a position as fireman on the Meadville-based Atlantic and Great Western Railroad line. He was engaged to Katherine Mitchell, the daughter of Erie engineer Joseph Mitchell, and married in November 1875.

After eight years of service, of which four years were spent on freight and another four on passenger, he passed the requirement to become an engineer receiving his official promotion in December 1878.

Cochrane continued running freight trains for another seventeen years and, although later allowed to run passenger trains, he requested to be transferred to local freight trains after two years. Throughout his career, Cochrane was praised for his clear record with no accidents and, a later member of the Brotherhood of Locomotive Engineers, Division No. 43, he held the distinction of having run the last broad-gauge engine out of Meadville before the main road was narrowed to standard gauge.

In January 1915, Cochrane was awarded the Order of the Red Spot, an award given to engine crews with minimal engine failures while in operation. Cochran continued working up until the 1920s as an engineer with the Oil City branch passenger trains between Meadville and Oil City.
