= Lake Cities (Erie Railroad train) =

American passenger train

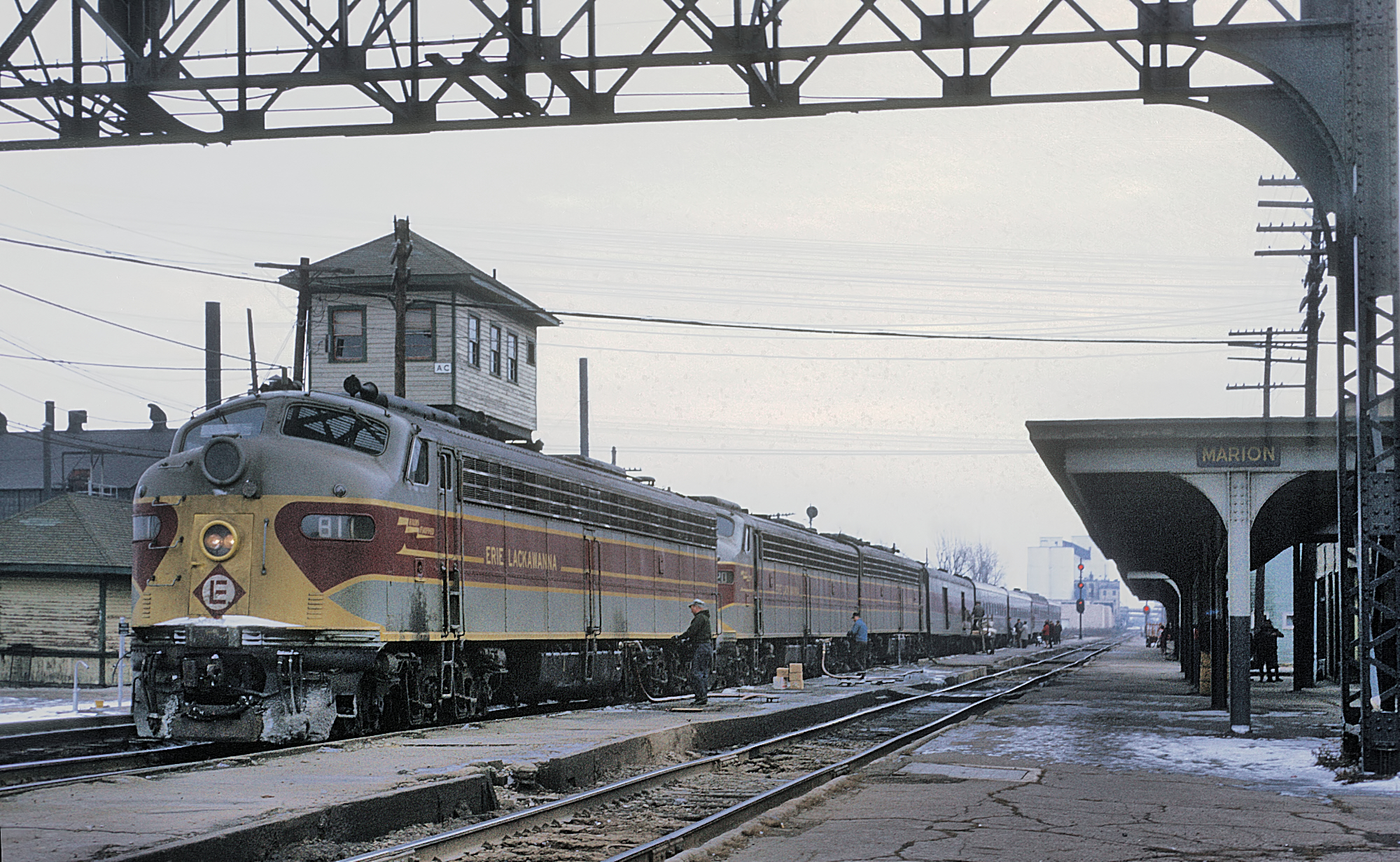
- The Lake Cities in Marion, Ohio in 1969

Overview
- Service type: Inter-city rail
- Status: discontinued
- Locale: Midwestern United States/Northeastern United States
- First service: 1939
- Last service: 1970
- Former operator: Erie Lackawanna

Route
- Termini: Hoboken, New Jersey, U.S. Chicago, Illinois, U.S.
- Distance travelled: 977.0 miles (1,572.3 km) (1969)
- Service frequency: Daily
- Train numbers: 5 (westbound), 6 (eastbound)

On-board services
- Seating arrangements: coach
- Sleeping arrangements: sections, Roomettes and Double Bedrooms
- Catering facilities: diner-lounge

The Lake Cities was a passenger train operated by the Erie Railroad and successor Erie Lackawanna Railway between Chicago and Jersey City, New Jersey and then Hoboken, New Jersey.

== History ==
The Lake Cities began in 1939 as the Midlander, a Jersey City to Chicago service with sections to Cleveland, and Buffalo, New York. From its eastern terminus, the Erie's Pavonia Terminal in Jersey City, the route ran through Port Jervis to Binghamton, New York over the traditional Erie main line through Sullivan and Orange County in New York's Southern Tier and on to Chicago. Unlike other New York City to Chicago trains, it bypassed Buffalo to the south, running through Jamestown, Youngstown, Akron, and Marion in Ohio.

A few years before the Erie's 1960 merger with the Delaware, Lackawanna and Western Railroad, the Lake Cities began running into the Hoboken Terminal in Hoboken. Upon the merger, it was routed over the Lackwanna's Poconos main line route in northern New Jersey and northeastern Pennsylvania. Between 1961 and 1962, the train was known as the "Chicago Lake Cities/Buffalo Lake Cities", but reverted to Lake Cities. Sleeper service ended on October 28, 1962. From April 26 until October 25, 1964, the Lake Cities was renamed The World's Fair in connection with the 1964 World's Fair in New York. After the conclusion of the fair in 1965, the Lake Cities name was restored to the train. On November 28, 1966, the Lake Cities regained diner and sleeper service to compensate for the withdrawal of the Phoebe Snow (which had its final run the previous day), but by 1967 the sleeping service went no further west than Marion, Ohio, while the dining car stopped at Huntington, Indiana.

On August 30, 1969, the Erie–Lackawanna asked for permission from the Interstate Commerce Commission (ICC) to discontinue the service effective August 30, 1969. The ICC ordered a 120-day stay to allow for hearings on the proposal in cities along the route of the service. The railroad then planned to end service after December 30, 1969, but continued it until January 4, 1970, due to additional ridership at the end of the holidays. After January 4, the Erie–Lackawanna withdrew the train, which was its last intercity service. Eliminating the service was expected to save the railroad $1.2 million a year.

== Equipment ==
After World War II the Erie acquired seven lightweight sleepers from Pullman-Standard, each with ten roomettes and six double bedrooms. The Lake Cities carried one in each direction between New York and Chicago.

== Station stops ==
This late 1960s timetable with the New Jersey and Pennsylvania stops reflects a consolidation of service with the Phoebe Snow train, which was discontinued in 1966.

Before the 1960 Erie-Lackawanna merger, the Lake Cities' route ran through New York's Sullivan and Orange Counties.

State	City	Milepost	Station
New Jersey	Hoboken	0.0 miles (0 km)	Hoboken Terminal
New Jersey	Newark	7.8 miles (12.6 km)	Newark
New Jersey	East Orange	10.6 miles (17.1 km)	Brick Church
New Jersey	Summit	20.1 miles (32.3 km)	Summit
New Jersey	Dover	40.9 miles (65.8 km)	Dover
New Jersey	Blairstown	67.2 miles (108.1 km)	Blairstown
Pennsylvania	East Stroudsburg	83.9 miles (135.0 km)	East Stroudsburg
Pennsylvania	Barrett Township	97.0 miles (156.1 km)	Cresco
Pennsylvania	Pocono Summit	105.0 miles (169.0 km)	Pocono Summit
Pennsylvania	Scranton	135.5 miles (218.1 km)	Scranton
New York	Binghamton	194.1 miles (312.4 km)	Binghamton
New York	Waverly	235.3 miles (378.7 km)	Waverly
New York	Elmira	252.9 miles (407.0 km)	Elmira
New York	Corning	271.0 miles (436.1 km)	Corning
New York	Hornell	311.5 miles (501.3 km)	Hornell
New York	Wellsville	337.7 miles (543.5 km)	Wellsville
New York	Olean	374.9 miles (603.3 km)	Olean
New York	Salamanca	393.0 miles (632.5 km)	Salamanca
New York	Randolph	410.4 miles (660.5 km)	Randolph
New York	Jamestown	426.8 miles (686.9 km)	Jamestown (Chautauqua Lake)
Pennsylvania	Corry	453.5 miles (729.8 km)	Corry
Pennsylvania	Meadville	495.2 miles (796.9 km)	Meadville
Pennsylvania	Greenville	521.4 miles (839.1 km)	Greenville
Pennsylvania	Sharon	536.3 miles (863.1 km)	Sharon
Ohio	Youngstown	549.9 miles (885.0 km)	Youngstown
Ohio	Warren	563.8 miles (907.3 km)	Warren
Ohio	Kent	594.2 miles (956.3 km)	Kent
Ohio	Akron	604.9 miles (973.5 km)	Akron
Ohio	Ashland	654.7 miles (1,053.6 km)	Ashland
Ohio	Mansfield	671.3 miles (1,080.4 km)	Mansfield
Ohio	Galion	686.8 miles (1,105.3 km)	Galion
Ohio	Marion	707.7 miles (1,138.9 km)	Marion
Ohio	Lima	759.6 miles (1,222.5 km)	Lima
Indiana	Huntington	834.2 miles (1,342.5 km)	Huntington
Indiana	Rochester	875.9 miles (1,409.6 km)	Rochester
Indiana	Hammond	955.8 miles (1,538.2 km)	Hammond
Illinois	Chicago	977.0 miles (1,572.3 km)	Dearborn Station
