= Cleveland commuter rail =

Rail service in Cleveland, Ohio

Commuter rail in Cleveland, Ohio, was operated by various companies until the discontinuance of the final route in early 1977. Since then, there have been several studies into the prospect of new commuter trains in the area, though none have progressed beyond the proposal phase.

== Historical ==
Numerous private railroads operated commuter rail services to Cleveland. The last of these was the ex-Erie Lackawanna service to Youngstown which had passed to Conrail; this ended in 1977.

=== Erie ===
Until 1976 the Erie Lackawanna Railroad, and previously the Erie Railroad, had operated a single daily commuter train between Cleveland and Youngstown, Ohio. The railroad had attempted to discontinue the train in 1970, along with its other passenger operations other than New Jersey commuter services, but the Public Utilities Commission of Ohio denied it permission. In 1976, Conrail took over operation of the Erie Lackawanna (EL) and closed the EL's offices in Cleveland. Ridership of the commuter train subsequently dropped significantly. As a result, the service was discontinued on January 14, 1977.

This service operated out of Cleveland Union Terminal and proceeded through Solon, Aurora and Warren before reaching its terminus at Youngstown, a total mileage of 66.2 miles (106.5 km) with thirteen stations served. The majority of the train's riders only rode as far as Aurora, only 23.3 miles (37.5 km) from Cleveland, but it continued as far as Youngstown because that was the first location able to handle turning the trainset around.

=== Pennsylvania ===
Up until 1965 the Pennsylvania Railroad operated a weekday commuter train to Youngstown via Ravenna, Ohio. Between 1953 and 1965 these trains terminated at Pennsylvania's Euclid Avenue station; prior to that they used the old Union Depot. The PRR discontinued the service on January 29, 1965, ending all PRR service in Cleveland.

=== New York Central ===
Until 1945 the New York Central operated a commuter train to and from Ashtabula, Ohio. This train terminated at Cleveland Union Terminal that was also used by the 20th Century Limited.

=== Wheeling & Lake Erie ===
Until the early 1930s the Wheeling & Lake Erie operated a commuter train to and from Canton, Ohio.

== Proposals for resumption of service ==
=== Past proposals ===
During the early 1990s, local governments in Canton, Akron and Cleveland jointly studied the possibility of rail service between those points. This proposal went as far as the purchase by the cities of both abandoned and in use railroad right-of-ways in the area, and in 1996, the Federal Transit Administration appropriated several million dollars in improvements to the purchased lines.

From 1997 to 2001, a study into the feasibility of commuter rail in the area, dubbed the Northeast Ohio Commuter Rail Feasibility Study, was conducted, eventually resulting in suggesting operating services on up to seven lines radiating from a proposed multi-model transportation center in downtown Cleveland. It suggested starting the system in three phases, with a potential total ridership of nearly 20,000 people a day, with a start-up cost of roughly $1.7 billion and an annual subsidy of around $55.2 million.

=== Present proposals ===
In February 2010, a study into a potential corridor between Cleveland and Sandusky began. The study cost $364,800, paid for with federal and local funds, and was conducted by Parsons Brinckerhoff Inc. It was estimated to take about a year to complete, and by January 2011 was nearing its end. The study would indicate whether rail service or another form of transportation was ideal for the route; if the result was rail, a year-long environmental impact assessment would be conducted, if not, transportation official in the area would discuss the situation further.

In October 2011, the results of the study were released, though an additional $200,000 analysis for the Federal Transit Administration was yet to come. The study proposed new local bus service in Lorain County in an initial five-year phase, followed by new commuter buses between Sandusky and Cleveland in the second five-year phase, commuter rail service between Cleveland and Lorain in the third phase, and later an extension to Sandusky. Initial bus services would cost $11 million, with annual operating costs of about $8.3 million, and the second phase of bus services would have $16 million in start-up and $10 million in operating costs, while the Cleveland—Lorain rail service would cost $160 million, with the Sandusky extension costing $220 million, with operating costs of $17 and $18.3 million, respectively.

The service was originally proposed to be operated under a public/private partnership, without using federal funding, though the 2011 study suggested using federal transportation grants, and was to have startup costs of around $100 million, and could begin as early as 2013. Ridership would include commuters, people traveling to Cleveland for sporting events, people traveling to ferry services to the Lake Erie Islands, and people going to the Cedar Point amusement park.
