= Atlantic and Great Western Railroad =

Defunct railroad in the northern US

A map of the Atlantic and Great Western Railroad

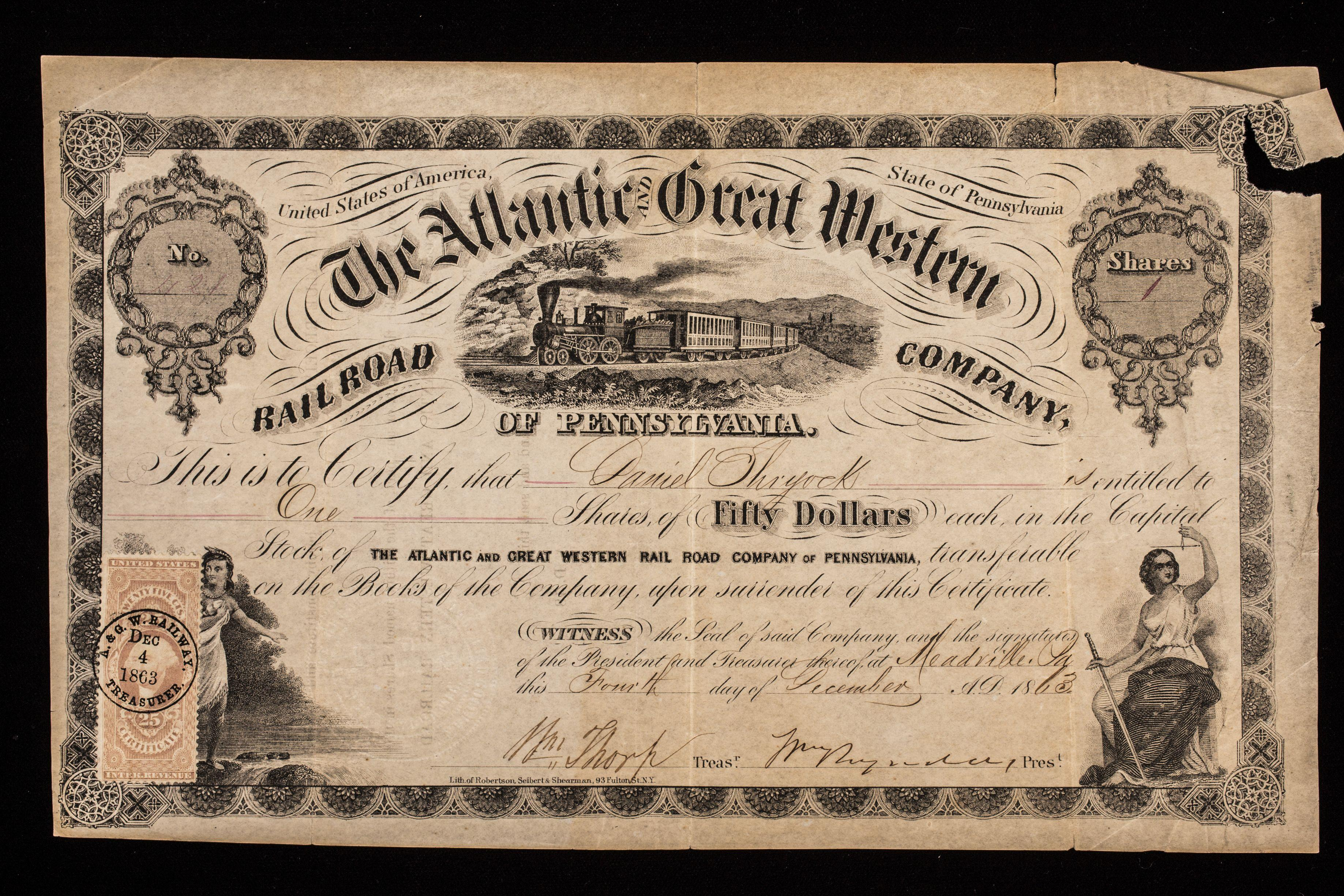
Stock certificate for the railroad

The Atlantic and Great Western Railroad began as three separate railroads: the Erie and New York City Railroad based in Jamestown, New York; the Meadville Railroad based in Meadville, Pennsylvania (renamed A&GW in April 1858); and the Franklin and Warren Railroad based in Franklin Mills, Ohio (renamed A&GW in January 1853).

The owners of the three railroads had worked closely together since an October 8, 1852, meeting in Cleveland to plan an expansion that was described as the "Great Broad Route", using the Erie Railroad to reach respective areas.

== History ==
On March 12, 1862, general control of all three companies was placed under a central board made of two directors from each of the companies. The Ohio Board was represented by Marvin Kent and Worthy S. Streator; the Pennsylvania Board by William Reynolds and John Dick; and the New York Board by A. F. Allen and Thomas W. Kennard. Reynolds was elected the board's president. The line reached Cleveland, Ohio on November 18, 1863, and was connected to the Cincinnati, Hamilton and Dayton Railroad in Dayton on June 20, 1864, which linked St. Louis with New York City via a 6 ft (1,829 mm) gauge line.

On August 19, 1865, an agreement was drafted to merge the three separate companies, each named Atlantic and Great Western Railroad, into the Atlantic and Great Western Railway. On October 5 of that year the new company issued a $30 million mortgage to pay off the outstanding mortgages on various companies included in the merger.

The company went into the hands of a receiver, Robert B. Potter of New York, on April 1, 1867. Potter operated the railroad until December 1868 when it was leased for 12 years by the Erie Railroad. Jay Gould, then president of the Erie, arranged to have the company again placed into receivership, this time with Gould and W. A. O'Doherty as receivers. This receivership was transferred to Reuben Hitchcock of Cleveland in November 1869. In February 1870, the Erie again leased the company, pending foreclosure. The foreclosure took place and the property was purchased on July 26, 1871, by Gen. George B. McClellan, William Butler Duncan and Allen G. Thurman. A deed for the property was finalized on October 3, 1871. The new company was named the Atlantic and Great Western Railway, the same as the old, but on consolidation of the individual parts (one in each state) in November, the name was changed back to the Atlantic and Great Western Railroad.

In May 1874, the Atlantic and Great Western was again leased by the Erie, at terms very generous to the A&GW and its backer James McHenry. On December 10, 1874, the new president of the Erie, Hugh J. Jewett, repudiated the lease and the company went into the hands of a new receiver, J. H. Devereaux. This action led to a series of lawsuits between McHenry and Jewett which brought shame to both companies. On January 10, 1880, the property was again sold at foreclosure and was reorganized as the New York, Pennsylvania and Ohio Railroad.

== See also ==
- Cambridge Springs (Erie Railroad station)
- League of Friendship, Mechanical Order of the Sun
- Samuel Cochrane
