= Nypano Railroad =

Map of the Nypano Railroad

The Nypano Railroad, earlier the New York, Pennsylvania and Ohio Railroad, was organized from the bankrupt Atlantic and Great Western Railroad in March 1880.

The road was owned by five of the English investors in the A&GW and ran from Salamanca, New York to Dayton, Ohio. J. H. Devereaux, former president of the A&GW, was elected first president of the new company. Devereaux was succeeded by Jarvis M. Adams who, on March 6, 1883, leased the NYP&O to the New York, Lake Erie and Western Railroad. On February 27, 1896 the property was sold under foreclosure to representatives of the Erie Railroad, and subsequently reorganized as the Nypano. The company was merged into the Erie in 1941.

The NYP&O was originally built as a 6 ft (1,829 mm) broad gauge line. On June 22, 1880 the line was converted to 4 ft 8 1/2 in (1,435 mm) standard gauge.
