= List of people from Kent, Ohio =

This following people are natives of or lived in Kent, Ohio, but not exclusively as students at Kent State University.

Name	Notability	Association	Category
Mike Adamle	Professional football player in the National Football League (NFL) with the Chicago Bears, general manager for WWE Raw, host of American Gladiators	Raised in Kent	Athletics
Tony Adamle	Professional football player in the NFL with the Cleveland Browns	Resident of Kent	Athletics
Julianne Baird	Teacher of voice	Resident of Kent	Performing arts
Deral Boykin	Professional football player in the NFL	Born and raised in Kent	Athletics
Greg Boykin	Professional football player in the NFL, 1977–1978	Raised in Kent	Athletics
John Brown	Radical abolitionist	Resident of Kent (Franklin Mills) ca. 1835–1839	Politics
Mary Ann Day Brown	Wife of abolitionist John Brown and mother of abolitionist Watson Brown	Resident of Kent (Franklin Mills) ca. 1835–1839	Politics
Watson Brown	Radical abolitionist and son of John and Mary Ann Brown; killed during John Brown's raid on Harpers Ferry	Born in Kent (Franklin Mills)	Politics
Tom Campana	Professional Canadian football player in the Canadian Football League, 1972–1977	Raised in Kent	Athletics
Vincent J. Cardinal	Playwright and director	Raised in Kent	Performing arts
Bob Casale	Musician, guitarist and keyboardist in the band Devo	Born and raised in Kent	Performing arts
Gerald Casale	Musician, founding member of the band Devo	Raised in Kent	Performing arts
Kathleen Chandler	State representative for the Ohio House of Representatives 68th district, 2003–2011	Resident of Kent	Politics
Kathleen Clyde	State representative for the Ohio House of Representatives 68th district, 2011–2019	Resident of Kent	Politics
Robert E. Cook	Member of United States House of Representatives for the 11th district of Ohio, 1959–1963	Born and raised in Kent	Politics
Vernon Cook	State representative for the Ohio House of Representatives, 43rd district, 1973–1987	Born in Kent	Politics
George Danhires	Sculptor, artist and educator	From Kent	Arts
John Davey	Pioneer in tree surgery and founder of the Davey Tree Expert Company	Resident of Kent	Science
Martin L. Davey	U.S. representative and governor of Ohio	Born and raised in Kent	Politics
Tom DeLeone	Professional football player in the NFL	Raised in Kent	Athletics
Joe Ebanks	Professional poker player in the World Series of Poker	Raised in Kent	Entertainment
Halim El-Dabh	Music composer, performer, educator, and ethnomusicologist	Resident of Kent	Performing arts
Todd Diacon	President of Kent State University since 2019	Resident of Kent	Academics
Cassius Fairchild	Wisconsin politician and Civil War officer	Born in Kent (Franklin Mills) 1829	Politics
Jairus C. Fairchild	First mayor of Madison, Wisconsin and first state treasurer of Wisconsin	Resident of Kent (Franklin Mills) ca. 1827–1834	Politics
Lucius Fairchild	Governor of Wisconsin and U.S. diplomat to Spain	Born in Kent (Franklin Mills) 1831; Fairchild Avenue in Kent named after him	Politics
James Fergason	Inventor of improved liquid crystal display technology	Resident of Kent	Technology
Kayla Fischer	Professional soccer player in the National Women's Soccer League	Born and raised in Kent	Athletics
Geno Ford	Head coach of the Kent State Golden Flashes men's basketball team, 2008–2011	Resident of Kent	Athletics
Michael C. Gould	Lieutenant general in the United States Air Force; 18th superintendent of the United States Air Force Academy	Raised in Kent	Politics
Henry Halem	Glass artist	Resident of Kent	Arts
Todd Hido	Contemporary artist and photographer	Born and raised in Kent	Arts
Garnet Jex	Artist and historian	Born in Kent	Arts
Angela Johnson	Author and illustrator	Resident of Kent	Literary
Laing Kennedy	Athletic director at Kent State University, 1994–2010	Resident of Kent	Athletics
Marvin Kent	Railroad executive and bank president	Resident of Kent; namesake of city	Business, politics
Riley Larkin	Professional football coach in the NFL	Born and raised in Kent	Athletics
Lester Lefton	President of Kent State University, 2006–2014	Resident of Kent	Academics
Jessica Lea Mayfield	Singer and songwriter	Raised in and resident of Kent	Performing arts
John McGilvrey	President of Kent State Normal College, 1911–1926	Resident of Kent	Academics
Gene Michael	Major League Baseball player, manager, and executive	Born in Kent	Athletics
Joel Nielsen	Athletic director at Kent State University	Resident of Kent	Athletics
Glenn Olds	Politician, president of Kent State University, 1971–1977	Resident of Kent	Academics
George Pake	Physicist, founder of Xerox PARC	Born and raised in Kent	Business, science
Julio Cesar Pino	Associate professor of History at Kent State University	Resident of Kent	Education
Lucien Price	Author and writer for the Boston Evening Transcript and The Atlantic Monthly; used the pseudonym "Woolwick" for Kent in some of his stories	Raised in Kent	Literary
Rod Reisman	Original drummer for the band Devo	Raised in Kent	Performing arts
Brian Rogers	Professional mixed martial arts athlete	Born and raised in Kent	Athletics
P. Craig Russell	Comic book writer, artist, and illustrator	Resident of Kent since 1981	Arts
Cynthia Rylant	Award-winning children's author	Lived in Kent	Literary
LeRoy Satrom	Mayor of Kent during the Kent State shootings in 1970	Resident of Kent	Politics
Michael Schwartz	President of Kent State University, 1982–1991	Resident of Kent	Academics
Joshua Seth	Voice actor	Raised in Kent	Performing arts
Sinkane	Professional singer and composer	Resident of Kent	Arts
The Six Parts Seven	Post-rock band	Raised in Kent	Performing arts
Seth Stewart	Broadway and film actor and dancer	Raised in Kent	Performing arts
Rohn Thomas	Film actor	Resident of Kent	Performing arts
Jim Tully	Writer	Resident of Kent, ca. 1907–1912	Literary
Beverly J. Warren	President of Kent State University from 2014 to 2019	Resident of Kent	Academics
Stan White	Former professional football player	Raised in Kent	Athletics
