= List of presidents of Kent State University =

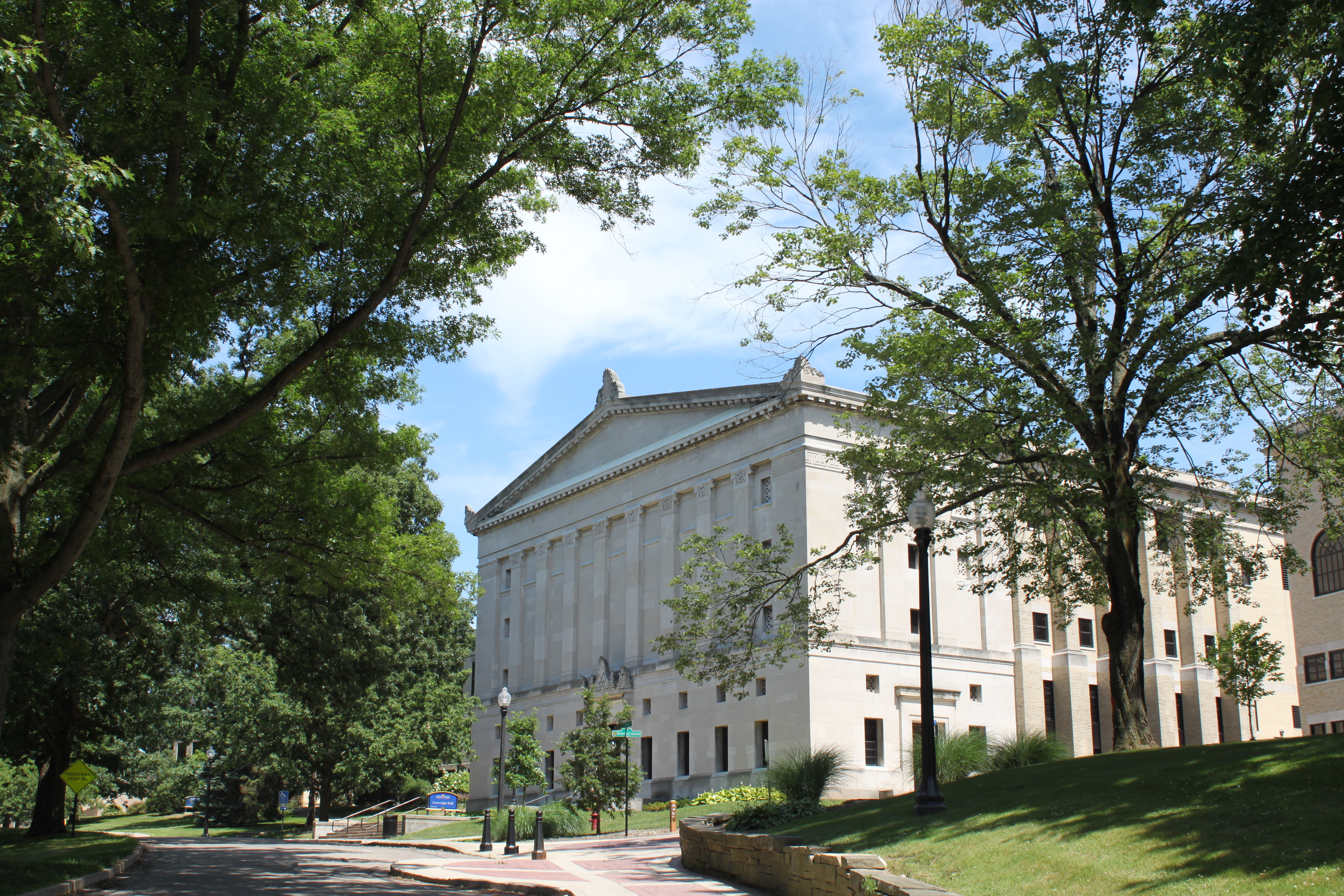
Cartwright Hall, Named after president Carol Cartwright

The following have served as president of Kent State University:

- John Edward McGilvrey (1911–1926); (b. 1867, d. 1945)
- David Allen Anderson (1926–1928); (b. 1874)
- James Ozro Engleman (1928–1938); (b. 1873, d. 1943)
- Karl Clayton Leebrick (1938–1943); (b. 1885, d. 1982)
- George A. Bowman (1944–1963); (b. 1893, d. 1976)
- Robert I. White (1963–1971); (b. 1909, d. 1990)
- Glenn A. Olds (1971–1977); (b. 1921, d. 2006)
- Brage Golding (1977–1982); (b. 1920, d. 2016)
- Michael Schwartz (1982–1991); (b. 1938)
- Carol Cartwright (1991–July 2006); (b. 1941)
- Lester Lefton (July 2006–July 2014); (b. 1942)
- Beverly J. Warren (July 2014–July 2019)
- Todd Diacon (July 2019–)

== See also ==
- List of Kent State University alumni
