= Robert I. White =

American university president (died 1990)

- Born: Robert Isaac White Jr. December 29, 1908; Elgin, Illinois, US
- Died: October 10, 1990 (aged 81); Ravenna, Ohio, US
- Education: University of Chicago, B.P., BPhil, MA, Ph.D.
- Occupations: Academic administrator and professor
- Years active: 1937-1975
- Employer: Kent State University

Robert Isaac White Jr. (December 29, 1908 – October 10, 1990) was an American academic administrator. He was president of Kent State University from 1963 to 1971, overseeing a significant period of institutional growth. The Kent State shootings took place during his tenure.

== Early life ==
White was born on December 28, 1908, in Elgin, Illinois. His parents were Fanny (née Goodenow) and Robert I. White Sr., was the superientdnent of Elgin Public Schools and, later, the assistant superintendent of evening and summer schools in Chicago, Illinois. The family moved to Chicago when White was twelve years old.

He graduated from the University of Chicago with Phi Beta Kappa, with a Bachelor of Philosophy, Master of Arts, and a Ph.D. He studied history and political science. He was a member of Sigma Nu and Kappa Delta Pi.

== Career ==
White began his career teaching fifth and sixth grades in Thornton, Illinois, followed by a high school in Chicago. He was the superindedant in Orland Park, Illinois in 1937; a principal in Burlington, Iowa; followed by becoming the president of a junior college. He was then a visiting associate professor at the University of Chicago. He became the dean of college education at Kent State University in 1946. In 1953, he also chaired the Teacher Education and Personnel Committee of the Ohio School Survey, formed the Ohio General Assembly. He was promoted to the university's first vice president for academic affairs in 1958.

On July 1, 1963, White became the sixth president of Kent State University; he was installed on October 25, 1963. His presidency included some of the "most important and influential years" of the university, with student enrollment growing from 4,763 in 1946 to 21,370 in 1970 and the campus growing from 500 acres to 1,580 acres. He also oversaw the construction of the university's twelve-story library.

The Kent State shootings of four students on campus by members of the National Guard took place during White's tenure, on May 4, 1970. In response, White closed the university from May 4 to June 2, 1970. At the time, an Federal grand jury in Ohio blamed the shooting on "Kent's permissiveness", exonerating the National Guard and indicting 25 people with riot charges related to protests on campus.

Once the gag order was removed by the judge overseeign the hearings, White spoke against the grand jury's findings, noting that this was an assault on free academia thath "would eventually destroy not only Kent State but all major universities in America". He said, "The academic community is not to be considered a sanctuary for those who wish to disobey the laws...But neither is the academic community a place where ideas—no matter how offensive—are to be suppressed". White's position was backed by votes of confidence from the faculty senate and university trustees.

In 1974, White testified before another Federal grand jury for two hours regarding the shootings. He was exonerated by the jury, along with Ohio Governor James J. Rhoades. However, the fledgling American Civil Liberties Union aand ACLU of Ohio eventually got the verdict appealed. Fifty years later, Todd Diacon noted, "There is great disagreement on whether then Kent State President Robert I. White did enough to avoid violence on this campus. There is also evidence that he wasn't in charge by the morning of the shootings." In 1970, White himself said, "Too many people think that when the president says some thing, everybody jumps. Well, it's just not that way in a university.

Although White had planned to retire at the end of the 1970–71 academic year, he continued to serve as president to get the university back into "full operation" before leaving. However, White showed "signs of intense emotional pressure", including the loss of fifty pounds. On September 15, 1971, White took a six-month sabbatical, hoping the university could find his replacement. He returned, not as president, but as a professor of educational psychology. White retired as emeritus professor of educational administration in January 1976.

White wrote the textbook, American Government Democracy at Work. He was a member of the American Association for School Administrators, the Ohio Education Association, and the Ohio Association of School Administration. He was a member of Phi Delta Kappa professional education fraternity.

== Honors ==
In 1976, the Kent State board of trustees renamed the College of Education for White.

== Personal life ==
On June 7, 1930, White was married to Evelyn Edna McCormick in Allegan, Michigan. She was from Ottumwa, Iowa. They had one son.

White was a deacon, board member, and moderator of the congregation of the Kent Congregational Church. He also served as a visiting pastor for area churches. He was also a member of the Kent Rotary Club and the Kent Area Chamber of Commerce. He was an honorary member of the Epsilon Psi chapter of Alpha Phi Omega at Kent State University.

White died at Robinson Memorial Hospital in Ravenna, Ohio, on October 10, 1990, at the age of 81.

== See also ==
- List of presidents of Kent State University
