= WKSU =

Public radio station in Kent, Ohio

- Kent, Ohio; United States
- Broadcast area: Akron metro area; Greater Cleveland; Northeast Ohio
- Frequency: 89.7 MHz (HD Radio)
- Branding: WKSU Ideastream Public Media

Programming
- Language: English
- Format: Public radio/talk
- Subchannels: HD2: Folk music; HD3: Classical (WCLV); HD4: Public radio
- Affiliations: APM; BBC World Service; NPR; PRX

Ownership
- Owner: Kent State University
- Operator: Ideastream
- Sister stations: WCLV; WCPN; WCSB; WVIZ

History
- Founded: March 3, 1940
- First air date: October 2, 1950
- Former call signs: WKSU-FM (1950–2016)
- Former frequencies: 88.1 MHz (1950–1961)
- Call sign meaning: "Kent State University"

Technical information
- Licensing authority: FCC
- Facility ID: 34045
- Class: B
- ERP: 12,000 watts
- HAAT: 276.21 meters (906 ft)
- Transmitter coordinates: 41°4′58.2″N 81°38′1.4″W
- Translator: See § Translators
- Repeater: See § Repeaters and boosters

Links
- Public license information: Public file; LMS
- Webcast: Listen live; Listen live (HD2); Listen live (HD3); Listen live (HD4)
- Website: www.wksu.org

WKSU (89.7 FM) is a non-commercial educational radio station licensed to Kent, Ohio, United States, featuring a public radio format. Owned by Kent State University and operated by Ideastream Public Media, WKSU's primary signal serves the Akron metro area, Greater Cleveland and much of Northeast Ohio as the regional affiliate for National Public Radio (NPR), American Public Media, Public Radio Exchange and the BBC World Service. The station's reach is extended into the Canton, Mansfield, Lorain, Ashtabula, Sandusky, New Philadelphia and Wooster areas via a network of five full-power repeaters, two low-power translators, and two on-channel boosters.

Founded by Kent State University, the station had its origins as a radio training workshop on the university's campus that provided programming for commercial radio stations, and save for a brief hiatus due to World War II, continued into WKSU's 1950 establishment as one of the first educational FM stations in the United States. An NPR affiliate since 1973, WKSU evolved from a university-operated station into a public radio and classical music outlet, with additional emphasis on folk music during the weekends. WKSU's influence extended into Cleveland, where from 1978 to 1984, it was the NPR information station of record for the entire region. After a public service operating agreement with WCPN owner Ideastream took effect on October 1, 2021, this distinction was again made official as both stations combined programming and personnel, with WKSU as the surviving entity.

WKSU's studios are located at the Idea Center in Downtown Cleveland, while the station transmitter is in Copley Township. In addition to a standard analog transmission, WKSU broadcasts over four HD Radio channels, is simulcast over WCLV's third HD subchannel and WVIZ's 25.7 audio-only subchannel, and is available online.

== History ==
=== Kent State Radio Workshop ===
Radio operations within Kent State University can be traced back to October 1939 with the establishment of the Kent State Radio Workshop, a division of the university's School of Speech led by director E. Turner Stump and professor G. Harry Wright, who joined Kent State (Note: Prior to 1935, this institution was known as Kent State College.) in 1930 and 1935, respectively; both had worked together previously at Marshall College. The Radio Workshop entered into a partnership with WADC (Note: WADC had already been broadcasting programs presented by Kent State's School of Speech on an sporadic basis as early as October 11, 1935.) to air a series of 15-minute long radio dramas produced by the Workshop on Tuesday afternoons; this began on March 3, 1940, with the program Lunch Room Nocturne, performed at the WADC studios in Tallmadge. Studios were constructed for the Radio Workshop on the university campus that were comparable to a licensed radio station and took nearly five years for Wright to secure; Wright also suggested the possibility of a carrier current AM station for the campus proper. The Radio Workshop also assumed production of a weekly radio program by Kent State faculty members from WTAM in Cleveland, that program was also moved to WADC. One of the last programs offered on WADC was an adaptation of the play Arsenic and Old Lace by the university's theater department on December 1, 1942.

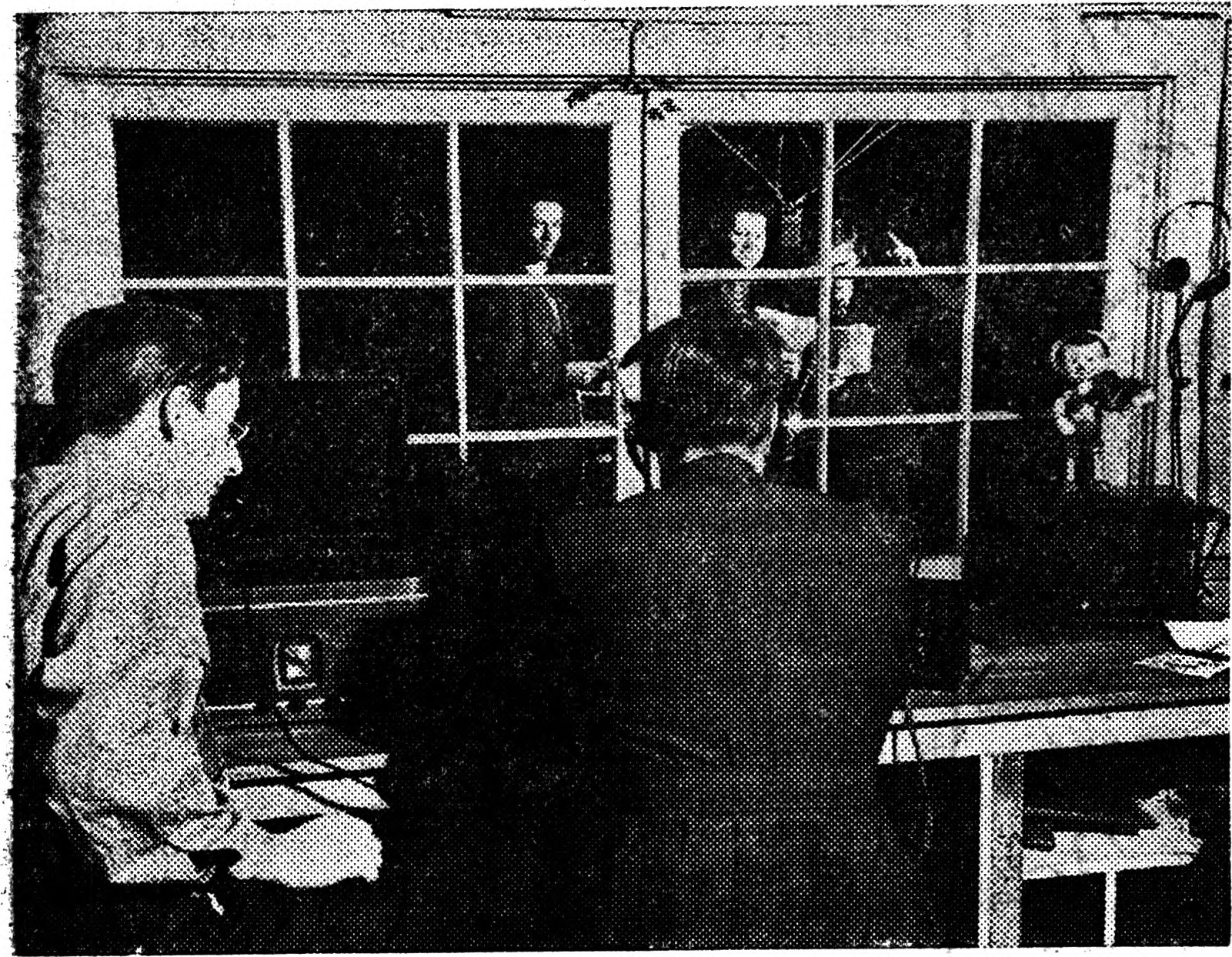
Kent State Radio Workshop radio drama rehearsal, January 1940

Programs did not air on terrestrial radio between 1943 and 1945 due to World War II, but the Radio Workshop remained in operation to assist in war effort purposes; this included a listening hour of classical music selections played for military personnel stationed on the campus. When the Radio Workshop was able to resume regular operations, WAKR began airing the workshop-produced programs on January 13, 1945, and continued to do so through 1950, airing on Saturday mornings. The Radio Workshop also signed on "WKSU", (Note: The university reportedly had requested the "WKSU" call sign with the FCC for this operation, but carrier current stations did not require an official broadcast license or an assigned call sign. The initial application for WKSU-FM was not filed until December 2, 1949.) an unlicensed carrier current station at 560 kHz, on April 4, 1949, carrying newscasts and rebroadcasts of the workshop's WAKR programs for the immediate university campus.

=== Early educational years ===
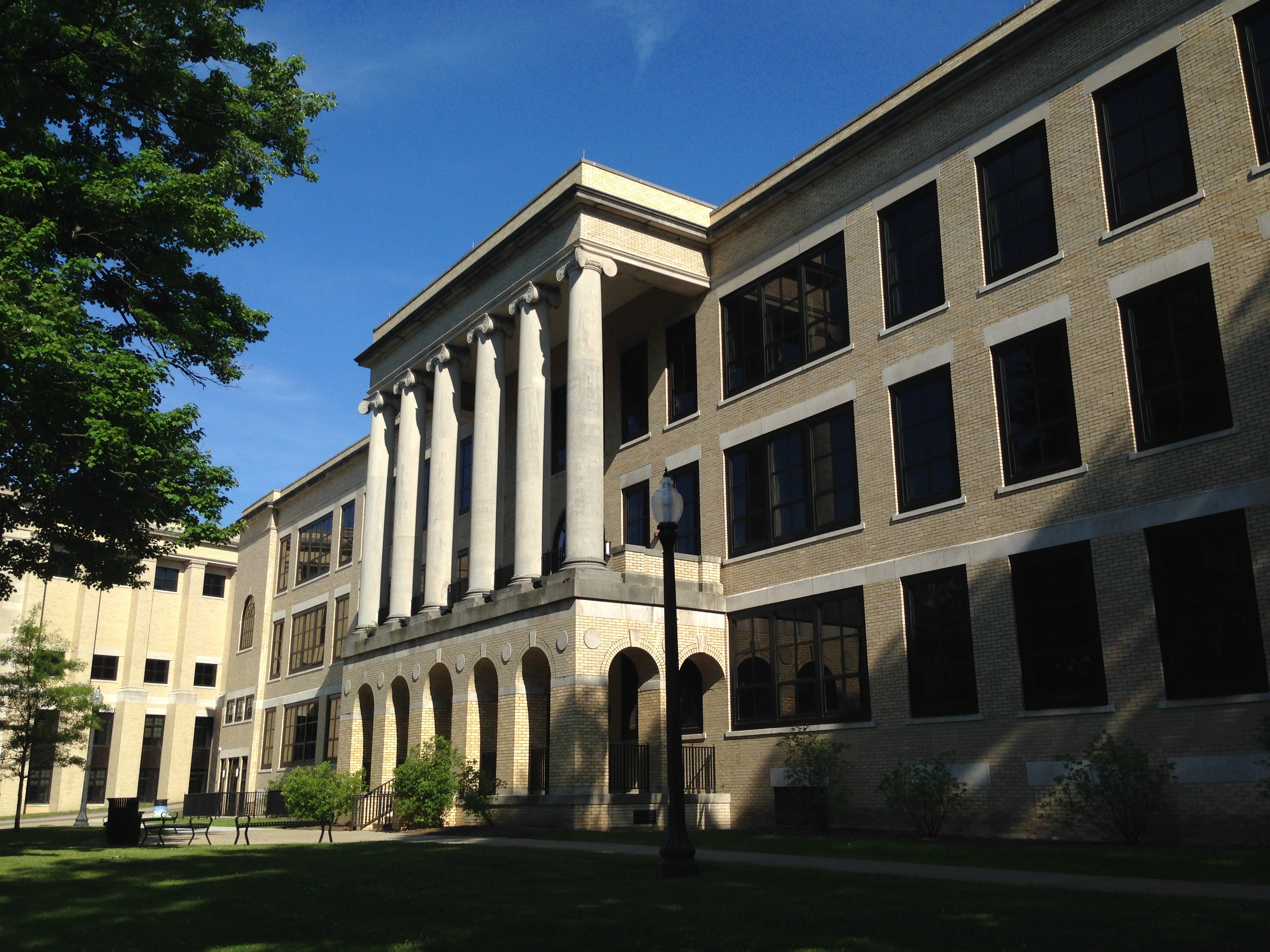
WKSU's original studios and 10-watt transmitter were located at the university's Kent Hall.

With the guidance of E. Turner Stump and speech professor Walton Clarke, the university and Radio Workshop filed paperwork in 1949 for a licensed 10-watt educational FM station. In April 1950, the FCC gave the university permission to build a small transmitter attached to the roof of Kent Hall, and after testing that began on July 19, WKSU-FM (88.1) was born on October 2, 1950. The signal was transmitted only within the confines of the campus, but the station encouraged people to report reception outside of the campus while they were in testing mode. By November of that year, WKSU-FM was broadcasting five hours a day, five days a week. WKSU-FM's operations were housed on the third floor of Kent Hall with a staff of fifty people, mostly community volunteers and student assistants. The launch of WKSU-FM necessitated the closure of carrier current "WKSU", but a lack of FM receivers and reception issues among the student body led to the launch of another "WKSU-AM" at 590 kHz on May 11, 1953, simulcasting the FM, while Stopher Hall also introduced a carrier current station of their own at 950 kHz using that building's steam pipe system. Neither station is documented to have lasted long.

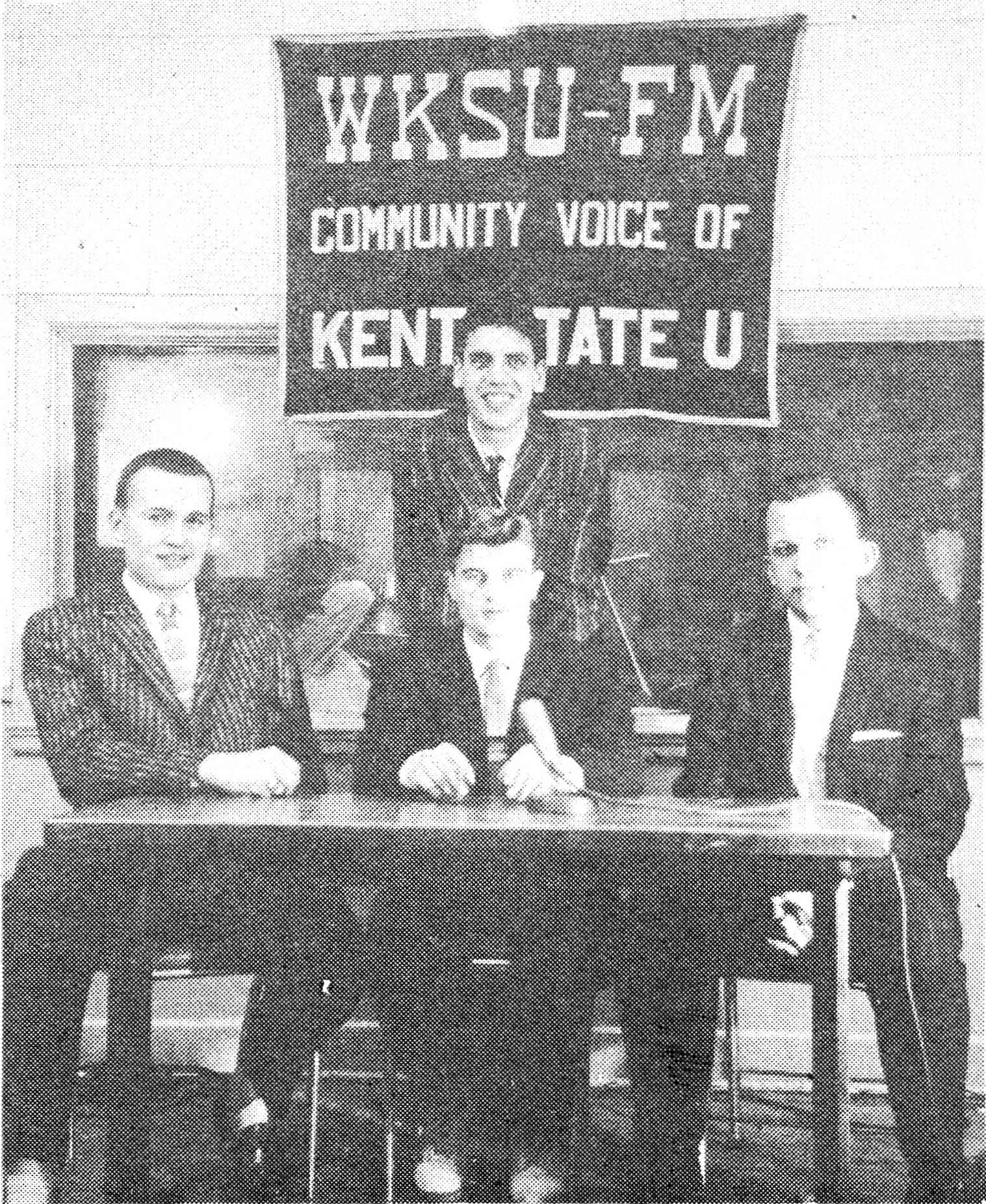
The WKSU news department in 1959

The station suspended operations in June 1960 following the completion of Kent State's Music and Speech Center; Walton Clarke and WKSU-FM operations director John Weiser had been involved with the center's planning and construction process as early as 1954. A closed-circuit television station—also bearing the unofficial "WKSU" calls—remained in operation. On January 13, 1961, the university announced that WKSU-FM would soon return to the air following a $27,000 investment, with hopes of establishing a full-time operation daily from 8 a.m. to 11 p.m. However, the initial choice of 91.9 MHz was challenged by a Cleveland FM station over potential interference. The FCC approved a frequency change to 89.7 MHz and a power increase to 7,500 watts, on December 20, 1961; the former 88.1 MHz frequency was quickly reused by WAUP, the Municipal University of Akron's radio station which signed on the following year.

WKSU-FM resumed operations in mid-March 1962 with an eight-hour broadcast day, de-emphasizing rock and roll in favor of additional classical music programming, show tunes and jazz; the station also affiliated with the National Association of Educational Broadcasters. WKSU began broadcasting the university's annual "Campus Day" parade and all home Kent State Golden Flashes sporting events were carried live. A third iteration of "WKSU-AM" at 730 kHz emerged in 1964 again as a WKSU-FM simulcast but adopted a separate programming schedule on January 18, 1965. Both stations were placed under the supervision of a student-faculty advisory board, with students encouraged to submit programs ideas for WKSU-FM to the board via an application process.

=== Campus unrest and the Kent State shootings ===
WKSU-FM's news department covered much of the campus unrest at Kent State University in the late 1960s, operations director John Weiser later said that the staffers "handled the events... in a professional manner." One of the more violent clashes during this period involved the station itself. A closed-door discipline hearing for two students connected to the Students for a Democratic Society (SDS) held at the Music and Speech Center on April 16, 1969, resulted in a group of supporters marching to the building and storming it, occupying the building's third floor and attempting to take over the station. One WKSU staffer and a Daily Kent Stater reporter suffered injuries when the demonstrators clashed with opponents outside the center's locked doors. The Ohio State Highway Patrol and riot police were called in to arrest 58 protestors in what Weiser later considered to be his most vivid memory working with the station.

After Kent, Ohio, was placed under a state of emergency on May 2, 1970, following a series of riots in the city and on the campus, WKSU-FM was used for a rumor control center for the student body dubbed "News Rap". Called in to restore order, the Ohio National Guard directed WKSU to broadcast a notice the morning of May 4, 1970, banning all outdoor gatherings under threat of arrest, directly preceding the guard opening fire on demonstrating students at 12:24 p.m. that day. WKSU news director Greg Benedetti's written eyewitness account of the shootings was printed in newspapers internationally via the Associated Press. In conjunction with the university, WKSU established an online archive of recordings and transcriptions related to the shootings on April 29, 2010, marking its 40th anniversary.

=== Joining NPR ===
Our main objective is to please the majority of people on the campus. It's now up to them to pick out what they want to hear. Here's their chance.

— Carl Monday, WKSU music director

As 1971 began, WKSU-FM instituted a request-driven progressive rock format; station music director Carl Monday likened the programming approach to a hybrid of existing progressive rock outlet WMMS and Top 40 outlet CKLW. One particular program, the late-night Fresh Air (unrelated to the public radio program of the same name) debuted on April 11, 1971, over both WKSU-FM and "WKSU-AM", developing a cult following over the freeform musical approach taken by the on-air hosts. Still, WKSU-FM's existence remained relatively sparse. By 1973, according to former general manager John Perry, WKSU-FM had only 7,500 watts of power, and was not yet broadcasting in stereo. The station was only on the air for 85 hours a week, and programming was created by students, and scheduled around their class and vacation times. The entire operating budget was $42,000, resulting in the station having a full-time staff of three that reached an audience of about 1,200 listeners but Fresh Air was the only program that actually had an audience. By contrast, "WKSU-AM" had expanded to 24-hour broadcasting in 1971 as an unlicensed station that could operate commercially, able to affiliate with Drake-Chenault's Hit Parade and American Contemporary Radio. To avoid confusion with WKSU-FM, "WKSU-AM" renamed itself "WKSR" at the start of 1976.

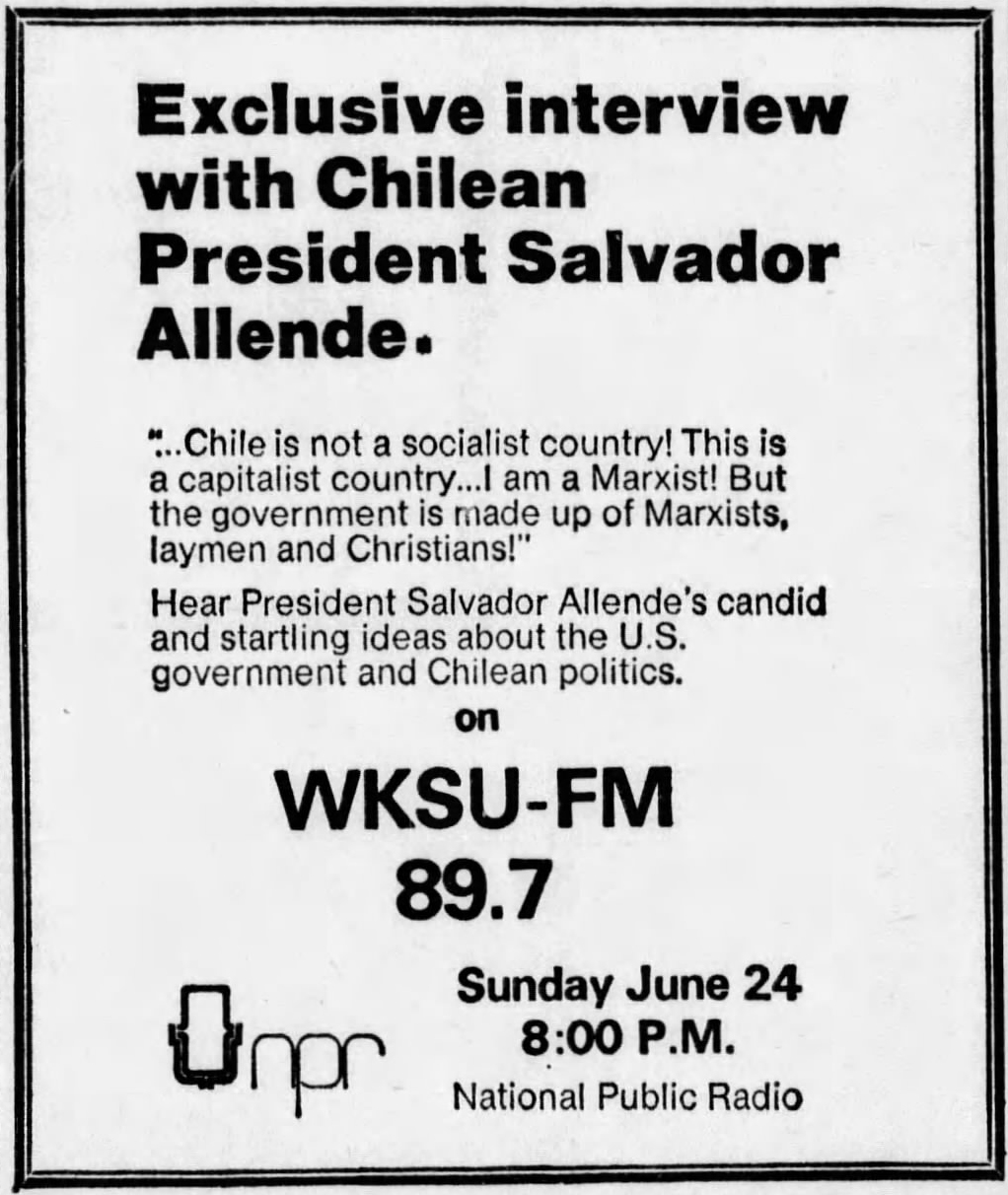
WKSU joined NPR in 1973; this ad promoted an interview with Chilean president Salvador Allende.

WKSU-FM secured a $25,000 Corporation for Public Broadcasting grant (equivalent to $181,316 in 2025) in 1973, and affiliated with National Public Radio (NPR) that same year, although an hour-long retrospective on the Kent State shootings was offered by WKSU to the network on May 3, 1971, the same day NPR began regularly scheduled programming. (Note: Program schedules for WKSU in the Akron Beacon Journal list "All Things Considered" airing on Wednesday evenings as early as March 1, 1972, but it is difficult to determine if this was the NPR program or an unrelated local program. WKSU did not have a full cable link to NPR established until after the CPB grant was offered. WKSU officially picked up All Things Considered to the lineup in 1974 and added Morning Edition upon its November 5, 1979, debut.) A separate grant from the Department of Health, Education, and Welfare allowed WKSU to convert to stereo. By February 1974, WKSU-FM debuted Morning Show, created by Cleveland broadcasting veteran Dr. Bill Randle (then a professor of communications at Kent State) which featured sports reports from Paul Warfield, who was continuing his graduate studies at the university. WKSU-FM hosted their first fundraising drive over the weekend of April 19–21, 1974, offering in advance to give half of the money raised to relief efforts in Xenia, Ohio, following the 1974 Super Outbreak. WKSU-FM met their goal of $10,000, with the relief efforts receiving $5,000. NPR's gavel-to-gavel coverage of the House Judiciary Committee's impeachment process against President Richard Nixon aired over WKSU-FM throughout the spring and early summer of 1974; area representative John F. Seiberling was a member of the Judiciary Committee, further driving local interest. (Note: All Things Considered was incorporated into NPR's longform coverage of these hearings, enabling WKSU to add it to the schedule when they concluded.) Even with these advancements, the university considered shutting down WKSU-FM in 1976. A fundraising drive in late April 1976 was titled "Backs to the Wall" to reflect the urgency; at the time, WKSU-FM had the least amount of financial backing among non-commercial educational stations by its host institution.

What I remember clearly is then-General Manager John Perry calling a meeting. And part of that was that this program called 'All Things Considered' was potentially coming our way. And what did it mean for us? That was a really big step: it was a landmark for NPR.

— Dick Russ, former WKSU reporter

Following the closure of part-time Cleveland NPR member WBOE (90.3 FM) by the Cleveland Board of Education on October 7, 1978, (Note: See WCLV § Financial calamity and suspension of operations.) WKSU-FM effectively began doubling as the de facto NPR member in Greater Cleveland and Northeast Ohio, with Cleveland earning the dubious distinction of being the largest metropolitan city in the United States without a dedicated NPR-aligned outlet. In July 1980, the station expanded its signal to reach over a million potential listeners in Northeast Ohio thanks to a grant from the National Telecommunications and Information Administration (NTIA) increasing its power to 12,000 watts. An additional power upgrade for WKSU-FM was filed with the FCC in early 1982 and contested by the Cleveland Public Library system, which had attempted to acquire WBOE's license and was competing with Cleveland Public Radio, who sought out a replacement license for 90.3 FM. Incidentally, the director for the Cleveland Public Library was not opposed to WKSU-FM's power increase request. A settlement between the Cleveland Public Library, Cleveland Public Radio and the Cleveland Board of Education by September 1982 cleared the way for WBOE's replacement, WCPN, to begin broadcasting on September 8, 1984, ending WKSU-FM's status as the unofficial NPR member of record for the entire region; WKSU-FM and WCPN management expressed optimism that both stations could remain viable and help increase awareness of public radio.

=== Growing pains in the 1980s ===
WKSU-FM linked up with the Westar 1 satellite on January 22, 1980; this proved useful in the station convincing NPR management to transmit The Texaco Metropolitan Opera Saturday Matinee over the satellite instead of through dedicated phone lines, that change took effect for the March 15, 1980 Metropolitan Opera Saturday Matinee broadcast. The satellite linkup not only greatly improved the fidelity of NPR programs over WKSU-FM, but also allowed the station to begin broadcasting and recording live music programs, including the Boston Globe Jazz Festival and the Salzburg Festival. In addition, a 1979 WKSU-FM production of A Christmas Carol presented by the Kent Acting and Touring Company—itself rebroadcast annually by the station—found national distribution on December 25, 1983, by American Public Radio, having chosen WKSU-FM's production over other stations, owing to a "warm, authentic sound." The 1980 satellite linkup, combined with the power increases for the station, triggered a period of growth and technical advancements. In the eight years since WKSU-FM became an NPR member in 1973, the station's audience had grown from 1,200 listeners per week to 58,000 per week and by 1979 was broadcasting around-the-clock.

People were trained at WKSR and only the good made it over to WKSU. Now it's not the case at all. After (the student-run progressive rock show) Fresh Air went off the air, WKSU made a conscious decision that they wouldn't hire students anymore.

— Doug Pieper, WKSR program director

WKSU's increased visibility and NPR carriage resulted in the station slowly streamlining their block programming format, as well as lessening the need for volunteers and student assistance. The summer of 1981 saw a schedule revamp with a reduction in folk music on weekend mornings and a later start time for Fresh Air, resulting in a debate during a Kent State Student Senate meeting over who was directly responsible for WKSU's programming policies. Fresh Air was cancelled on December 30, 1981, with jazz programming taking its place; the move was controversial among the student body as a memo issued forbidding any "lobbying" over the show's future was read on-air during the final program. A WKSU spokesperson attributed the cancellation to the program losing money and audience, becoming "something different, other than what it had been." John Perry later said of the show's ending, "...it had a little bit of an audience, just not a supportive one." WKSU-FM stopped hiring students and WKSR staffers at this time, with WKSR program director Doug Piper calling it "a conscious decision" after years of past practices of WKSU-FM hiring "only the good" from WKSR, which operated primarily as a training ground. Jazz and blues fare were fully removed from the schedule on June 27, 1990, along with a late-night new-age music program, as WKSU opted to focus entirely on classical fare and folk music; the station's blues music library was subsequently donated to WCPN.

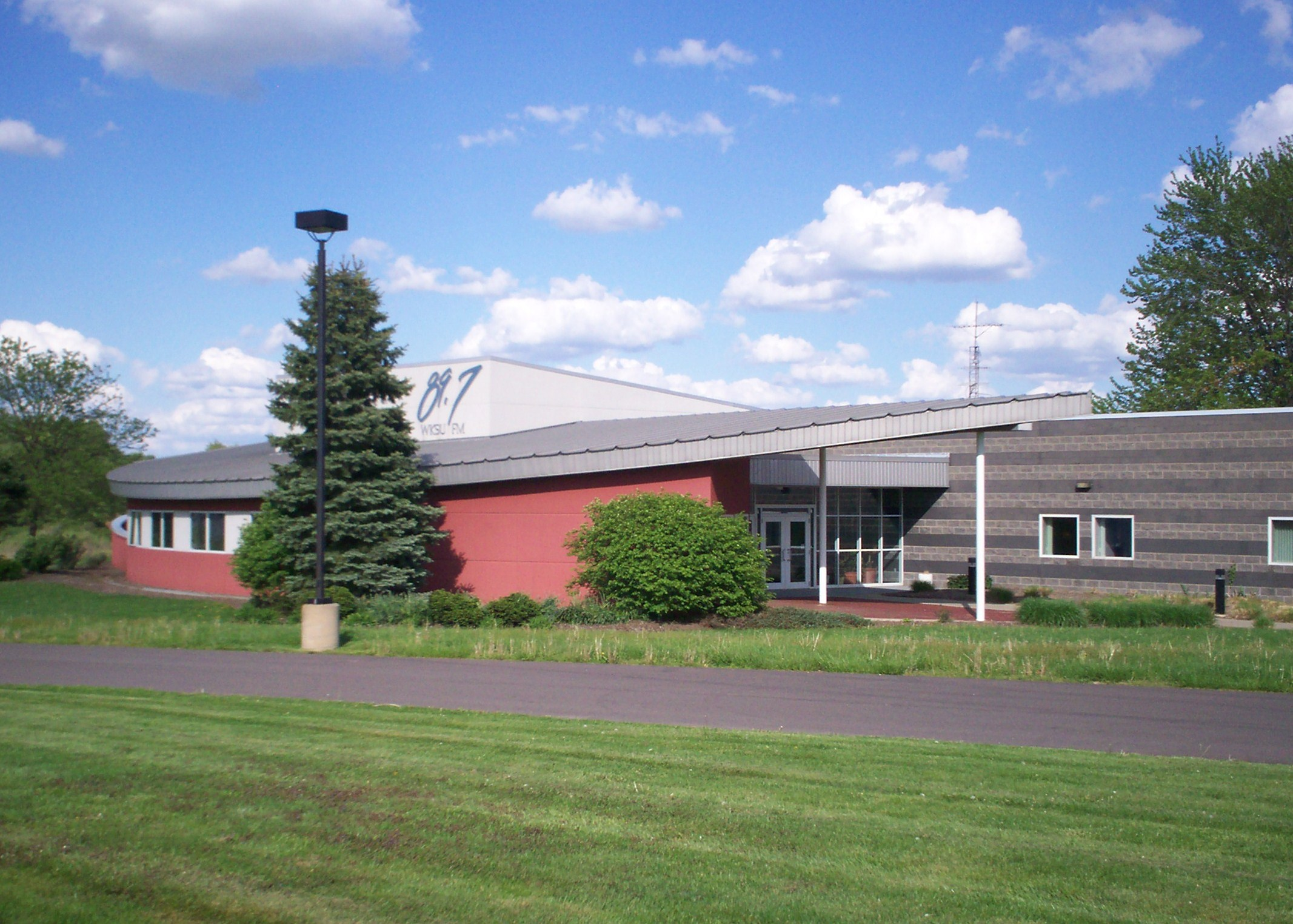
WKSU's former studios on Loop Road in Kent, built exclusively for the station and housing it from 1992 until merging with Ideastream

WKSU-FM's administrative offices moved to Wright Hall, which was originally built as a dormitory, in 1977 after six floors of the building were turned into office space. General manager John Perry had made known intentions for WKSU-FM's operations to be consolidated into one facility, saying, "we want to take the assets of the area and have them represented nationally". As Kent State's student population began to grow in the mid-1980s, Wright Hall was reconverted back into dormitories, forcing the station's offices into leased space at a former restaurant east of the campus in 1987. The station's studios remained at the Music and Speech Building but were under pressure to move by 1990 as the university needed additional classroom space, while WKSU and WKSR encountered space issues at said building as early as 1983.

WKSU-FM began a long-term $1.5 million fundraising drive in November 1987, initially to purchase the leased building and move all operations there but opted to construct a new facility on the campus proper by the end of 1990. Groundbreaking for the new $2.1 million building at the northeast corner of Loop Road and Summit Street took place in September 1991. Matching grants awarded to WKSU by the Kresge Foundation and the GAR Foundation totaled $200,000 but were contingent on the station raising the same amount by June 30, 1992, which it did via multiple fundraisers, an art auction, a golf outing and selling engraved bricks at the entrance one of which was used for a marriage proposal. WKSU-FM completed the move to the new building on December 3, 1992, with a dedication event held that evening; capital campaign chairman Howard Flood noted during the dedication that no other college-owned radio station had ever successfully completed such a fundraising effort consisting entirely from private sources. Recognized as a student organization earlier in 1992, WKSR remained at the Music and Speech Building and abandoned carrier current AM by 1999 in favor of internet radio, rebranding as Black Squirrel Radio in 2005.

=== Establishing a network ===
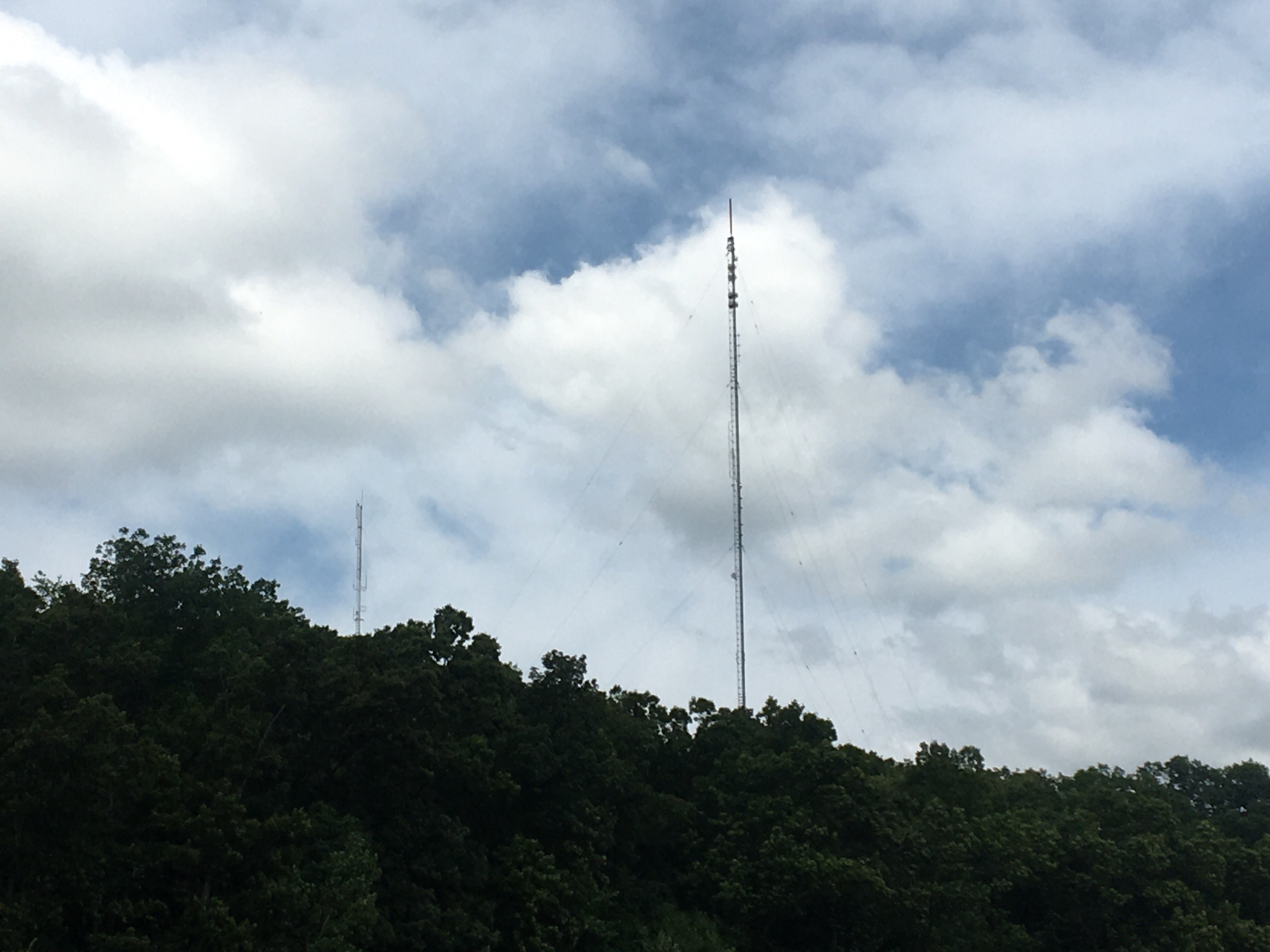
WKSU's transmitter mast located in Copley Township, Ohio

WKSU-FM's most ambitious move was the creation of a repeater network, aided by both the U.S. Department of Commerce and Ohio Educational Broadcasting Network providing funding to stations wishing to expand their reach to areas not served by public radio. The first repeater, WKRW in Wooster, was activated on March 29, 1993, after a study of listener donations saw the Wooster area contributing more money per capita to the station than any other city in the region. WKRJ in New Philadelphia followed as the university had an existing satellite campus in Tuscarawas County; a "groundbreaking ceremony" consisting of a cake cutting took place on October 18, 1991, but delays and a change to the proposed transmitter site resulted in the station signing on in the summer of 1993. WKSU's existing Kent transmitter was replaced with a new 909-foot (277 m) tower in Copley Township in 1994, again funded by NTIA but was controversial as it risked encroaching on WCPN, whose management asserted was "the region's (National Public Radio) station". The move was well received by students as the previous 430-foot (130 m) on-campus transmitter had to operate at 50,000 watts, creating interference that affected dorm telephones and tape players; several students even claimed to receive WKSU's signal in their mouth through tooth fillings. Student-run WKSR helped to arrange and finance a frequency move for second-adjacent WAPS (89.3 FM) to 91.3 FM.

Station logo from the 2000s

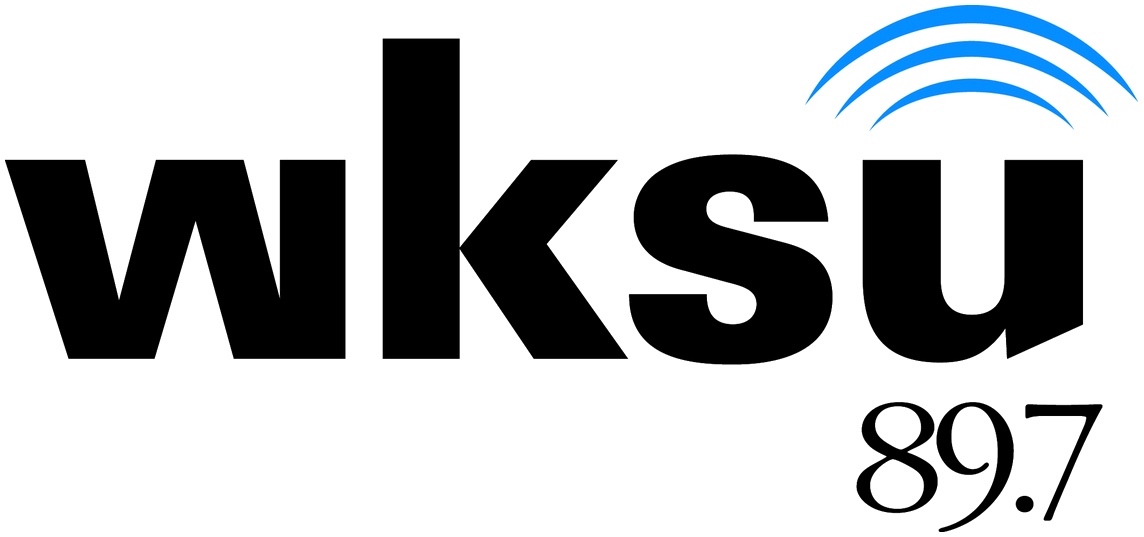
Logo used prior to merger with Ideastream.

WKSV in Thompson Township was added in 1997 and WNRK in Norwalk in 2004; WNRK became the first dedicated public radio outlet in the "Vacationland" region serving approximately 66,000 residents. Low-power translator W239AZ (95.7 FM), based in Ashland, was established in 2006 to help address interference between WKSU and WOSU-FM in Columbus, both of which broadcast on the same frequency. A second translator, W298BA (107.5 FM) in Boardman and serving the Mahoning Valley, also came online in 2006 but fell silent at the end of November 2011 with the license subsequently surrendered. W234CX (94.7 FM) in Mansfield started operating on December 27, 2016, owing to W239AZ's limited reach outside of Ashland. Columbus–licensed WSNY, which operates on the same frequency as W234CX, began appealing to affected WSNY listeners in Mansfield but withdrew a planned challenge to the FCC after less than five listener complaints were received. Initial estimates by the station's repeater proposals predicted that WKSU's repeater network would be able to reach over one-third of Ohio's population when fully activated. The additional signals enabled WKSU to originate more local programming, including a nightly newsmagazine hosted by Renita Jablonski and a weekly program with Plain Dealer columnist Regina Brett; both Jablonski and Brett, along with news director Dave Pignanelli, joined WKSU after prior work at WCPN.

The station's website was launched in 1994, and began offering on-demand streaming starting in May 1995 with the Akron Roundtable program. WKSU-FM additionally launched three distinct programming streams over their website in August 2005—WKSU's on-air feed, "The News Channel" and "The Classical Channel"—along with a stream on the station's separate website for Folk Alley. These internet-only streams were created as prototypes for potential digital subchannels using the HD Radio in-band on-channel standard and eventually were launched as such, while also appealing to listeners that had a preference for either all-classical or all-information programming. By 2010, WKSU was the only radio station in the state to offer three distinct HD subchannels, while general manager Al Bartholet also noted that internet radio could be the future of the medium should a workable business model be found. In 2011, WKSU employed a staff of 35 people and boasted an audience of 180,000 listeners while WCPN employed 150 people (Note: This includes staff from co-owned PBS member station WVIZ.) and served 300,000 listeners.

=== Kent State Folk Festival ===
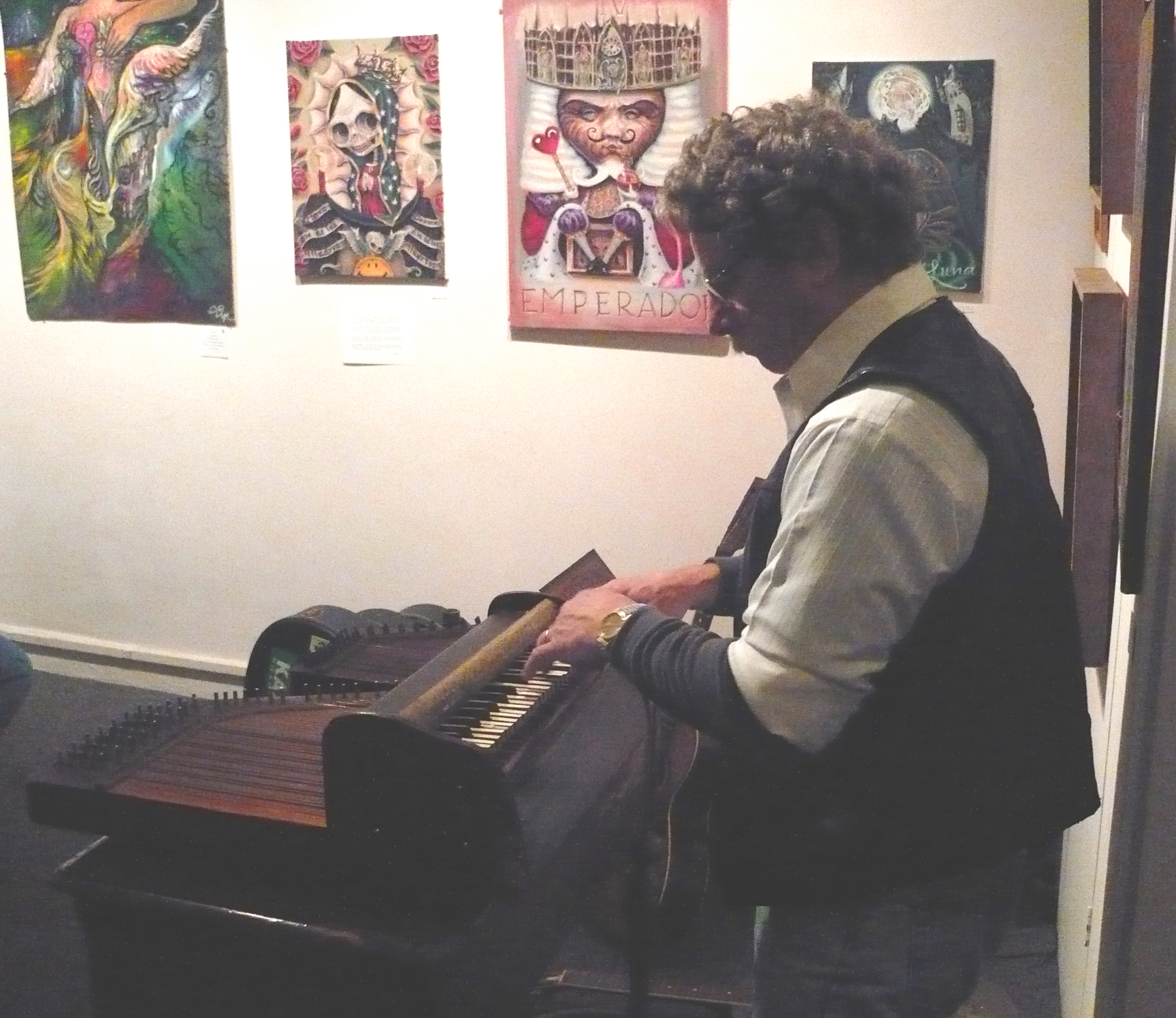
A dolceola concert during the 2006 WKSU Folk Alley 'Round Town

The Kent State Folk Festival was started in 1967 by a group of Kent State students. WKSU began actively broadcasting the festival's concerts live in the early 1990s, with the festival rearranging start times in 1996 to accommodate WKSU's existing program commitments. It was produced by student groups until the Kent State Student Senate voted to defund the activity in 2000; a coalition of businesses and organizations assumed control of the event, with WKSU-FM as the lead presenter. While the make up of festival programming changed from local musicians and groups representing ethnic heritage to national touring acts, the theme was consistently tied to folk and roots music; the festival also included workshops on folk music and dance along with concert performances.

The Kent State Folk Festival typically featured several performances by both legendary and up-and-coming folk artists. Later line-ups included Bob Dylan, Donovan, Avett Brothers, Doc Watson, Carolina Chocolate Drops, Dawes, Judy Collins and Arlo Guthrie.

With WKSU-FM's involvement in the Kent State Folk Festival, a day of free concerts throughout the city of Kent was created. 'Round Town (later Folk Alley 'Round Town) drew thousands of people to downtown Kent each year. In 2013, the entire festival was renamed the 'Round Town Music Festival to expand the programming scope. WKSU ended its involvement with the festival the following year.

=== Folk Alley ===
WKSU-FM launched FolkAlley.com as a standalone website in September 2003, centered around the station's folk, roots, and Americana music libraries. The website was headed by Jim Blum, a folk announcer at WKSU since 1980 and once regarded by Judy Collins as "a national treasure". Within FolkAlley.com's first five years, web traffic data showed the site had been accessed in 130 different countries, resulting in a subscription base of 89,000 people and becoming the first public radio-produced internet stream to generate a profit; WKSU general manager Al Bartholet regarded the website as "like an international operation" successfully autonomous of WKSU-FM. By the time of his retirement in late 2012, Bartholet called his experience programming FolkAlley.com to be "a lot of fun." An extension of the website, The Folk Alley Radio Show with Elena See was launched as a weekly two-hour program syndicated via PRX, with 40 stations worldwide carrying the program in 2015. University of Pennsylvania radio station WXPN began streaming the Folk Alley feed on their website in 2007.

Kent State University and WKSU donated FolkAlley.com and the radio show to the FreshGrass Foundation—publishers of No Depression—on March 7, 2019, having successfully operated as a fully self-sustaining entity throughout Kent State and WKSU's stewardship. The donation ensured a reliable access to resources for the show and the website, with WKSU no longer responsible for operational costs. WKSU's HD2 subchannel simulcast of FolkAlley.com remained in place.

=== Shift to news programming ===
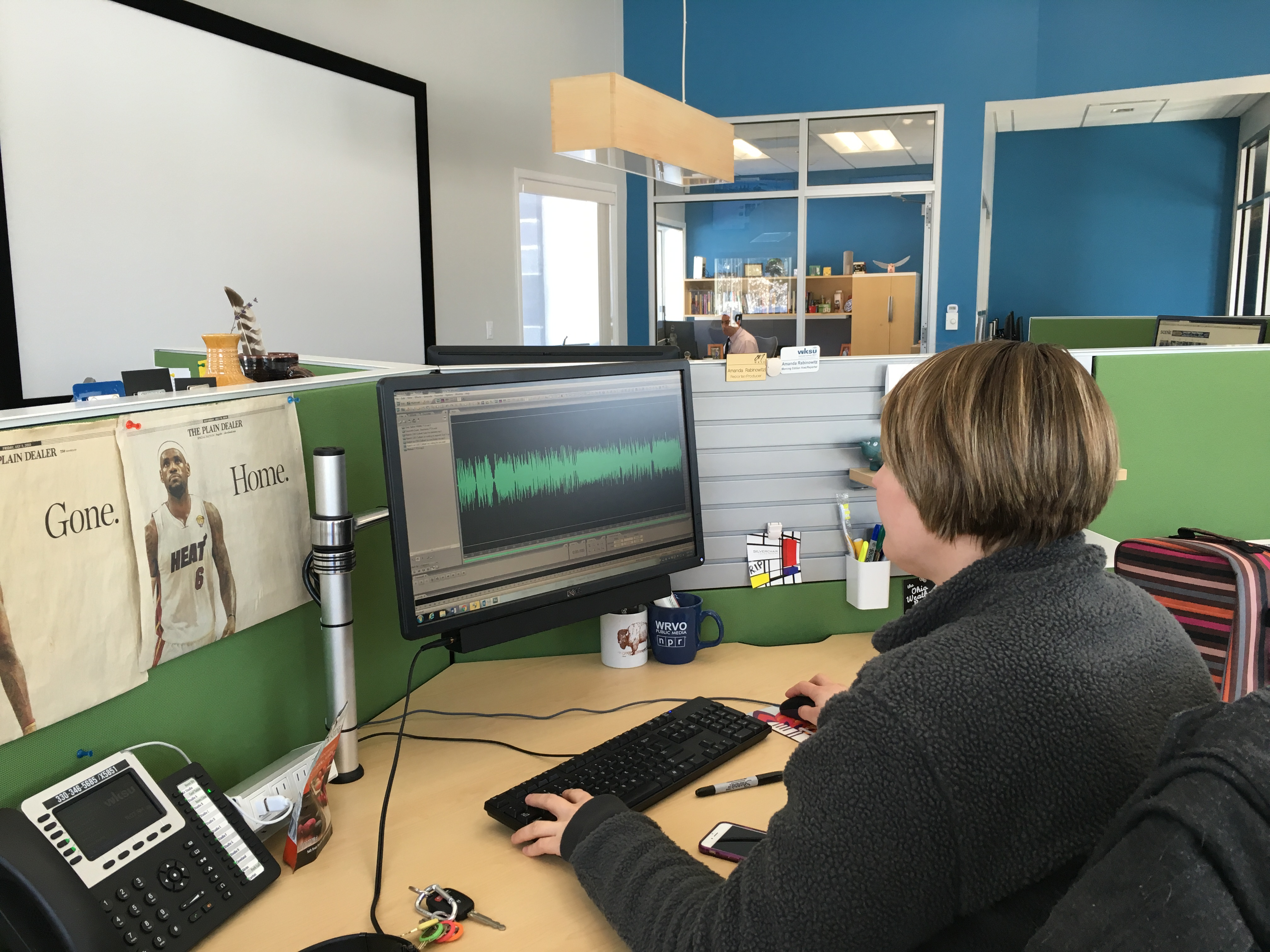
Afternoon host Amanda Rabinowitz working in the WKSU newsroom

After heading WKSU-FM for 11 years and being involved with the station in some capacity since 1980, general manager Al Bartholet retired at the end of 2012. Dan Skinner, former president of Texas Public Radio, took over as Bartholet's replacement after a nationwide search conducted by the university. Skinner oversaw WKSU-FM's shift to a more news-related schedule on August 5, 2013, remarking that, "this combination of news and music is the sound of Northeast Ohio's future." WKSU had already been carrying the first hour of Here and Now in between locally hosted classical programming; the format shift coincided with NPR expanding Here and Now as part of a larger initiative to revamp the network's image. Most notably, classical music was limited to evenings and overnights and folk music programming on the primary channel was relegated solely to Folk Alley, with the daytime lineup starting to heavily mirror that of WCPN. Two of WKSU's three remaining local classical announcers, Sylvia Docking and Mark Pennell, left the station in 2014 and 2020, respectively.

WKSU-FM launched multiple regular news segments including weekly interviews with Plain Dealer sports writer Terry Pluto, Quick Bites stories on food and eating and Exploradio reports on research and innovation. Amy Reynolds, dean of the university's College of Communications and Information, began hosting Elevations, a five-minute interview program on Saturday mornings. During a Kent State University Board of Trustees meeting in late 2015, chairman Dennis Eckert advocated for WKSU-FM to offer more locally based programming to national distributors like NPR to help boost the university's name awareness; WKSU-FM continued to produce Folk Alley for syndication and the station's news department frequently filed reports for NPR's news programs.

In a cosmetic move, WKSU-FM's call sign changed to WKSU on June 23, 2016, removing the "-FM" suffix.

=== Ideastream merger ===
It is a gem. It is a treasure in Northeast Ohio, and it covers a part of Ohio that Ideastream doesn't cover. We have developed such a station that is revered, and now, it's just going to be second to Ideastream. I know there are financial issues. But the university should be proud to have an NPR station on its campus, not try to get rid of it.

— Elizabeth Bartz, WKSU Community Advisory Council member from 1981 to 2021, reacting to WKSU's combination into Ideastream

The Portager reported on September 9, 2021, that Kent State University's board of trustees were planning to vote at their forthcoming meeting on a "public service operating agreement" proposal de facto merging WKSU into WCPN owner Ideastream; the meeting's advance agenda was largely withheld from the public but leaked to the Portager anonymously. The details of the agreement proposal had Ideastream assuming operations of WKSU on October 1, 2021, with all WKSU employees retained by Ideastream for at least one year, while the university would still contribute to their retirement pensions. This proposal had origins in a $100,000 CPB grant jointly awarded to WKSU and Ideastream on September 1, 2020, to help expand public media service in Northeast Ohio and encourage collaboration between both entities. The grant was prompted due to a decline in electronic and print journalism jobs in the region by 60% since 2004.

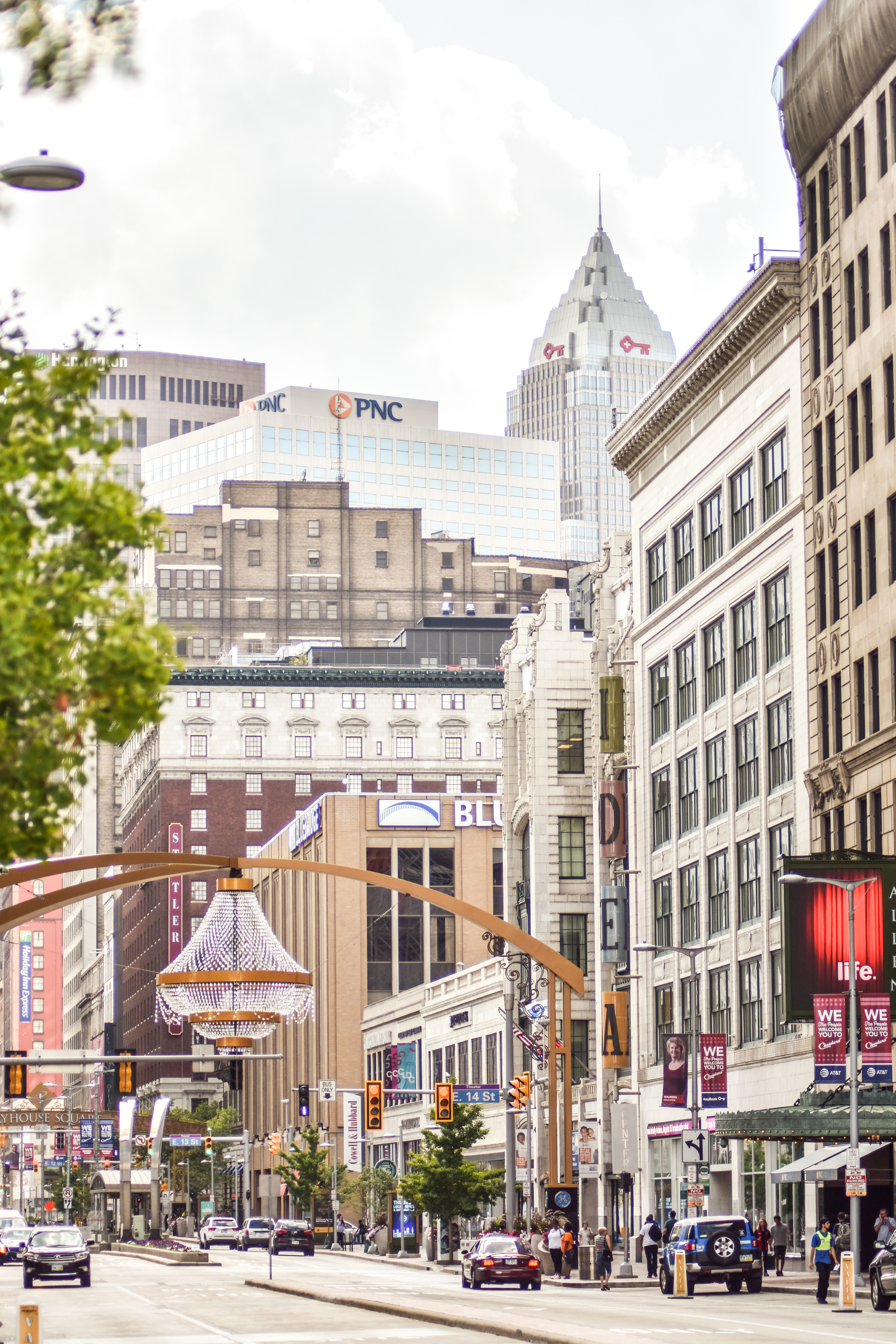
The Idea Center (right), WKSU's studio facilities at Playhouse Square in Downtown Cleveland

Elizabeth Bartz, a former member of WKSU's community advisory council, found out about the merger proposal just before her term expired in May 2021 and voiced her disappointment in the lack of communication with Kent State president Todd Diacon. Diacon countered by stating privacy had to be maintained in the event that the proposal—directly involving WKSU employees—did not come to fruition. Former WKSU general manager John Perry interpreted the proposal as "a deep alignment" between the two entities that had a "potential upside" despite the likely changes, while Perry's successor Al Bartholet expressed concern about WKSU having their focus on Kent and Akron diminished in favor of Ideastream's Cleveland orientation. Bartholet's concerns were echoed by Bartz, who felt that WKSU was a "treasure (that) is leaving Northeast Ohio" and would "be second to ideastream". Former radio executive John Gorman noted that WKSU's news department had for decades been a strong contributor to NPR, while WCPN had only recently established a fully staffed newsroom with coverage that "pales in comparison". A press release on Ideastream's web site concurrently stated that WKSU had been in operation for 71 years, "almost twice as long as WCPN".

The deal was approved by the board of trustees on September 15, 2021, with no money changing hands. WKSU general manager Wendy Turner hailed "the logic of this convergence (that) stares us right in the face", Diacon expressed confidence in enhanced journalism, reporting and public affairs and WKSU news director Andrew Meyer felt the merger would help bolster manpower and resources for the station. Under terms of the proposal, WKSU became Cleveland and Akron's lead NPR station under Ideastream management, retained all local shows and inherited WCPN's local productions The Sound of Ideas and the City Club of Cleveland's Friday Forum. The second phase of the changeover on March 28, 2022, had WKSU drop all music programming while WCPN changed call letters to WCLV and format to classical music. WCLV's prior 104.9 FM facility changed their calls to WCPN and became a WKSU repeater for Lorain County and the western portion of Greater Cleveland. WKSU applied for on-channel boosters to address reception issues in Cleveland proper, which it was eligible for on the condition that 90.3 FM drop all news-related programming. With the addition of 104.9 FM to the repeater network, WKSU boasted a 22-county coverage area and potential audience of 3.6 million people, the largest collective footprint for an FM radio station in Ohio.

WCPN morning host Amy Eddings (who had joined that station in 2017) was transferred to WKSU in the same capacity, while existing WKSU hosts Amanda Rabinowitz and Jeff St. Clair were retained for what Ideastream billed as "expanded news breaks" throughout the weekday. An internship program for Kent State journalism students has remained in place; Ideastream president/CEO Kevin Martin noted, "what's important for not only Northeast Ohio but all of Ohio, with the decline in print journalism, is to really build up the next generation of journalists and to take on... that priority."

== Programming ==
WKSU has a heavy emphasis on news and informational programming, most of it originating with NPR such as Morning Edition, All Things Considered, 1A, Here and Now and Fresh Air. It also carries The Daily and Marketplace from American Public Media, The World from Public Radio Exchange, Radiolab, Science Friday and The New Yorker Radio Hour from WNYC Studios, and simulcasts the audio of PBS NewsHour in early evenings.

WKSU's local programming includes The Sound of Ideas, an hour-long current events talk show hosted by Rick Jackson and Michael McIntrye. Local inserts on Morning Edition, Here and Now and All Things Considered are hosted by Amy Eddings, Jeff St. Clair and Amanda Rabinowitz, respectively. WKSU originates the live broadcast of the City Club of Cleveland's Friday Forum during the noon hour. BBC World Service programming airs in overnights.

== Technical information ==
=== HD broadcasting ===
WKSU broadcasts over the following four digital subchannels using the proprietary HD Radio standard:

- WKSU-HD1 is a simulcast of WKSU's analog feed.
- WKSU-HD2 airs folk music from FolkAlley.com.
- WKSU-HD3 is a simulcast of WCLV's analog feed.
- WKSU-HD4 carries an alternate schedule of news and talk programming from NPR and the BBC World Service branded "News and More". Think and As It Happens air exclusively on this channel, along with Folk Alley and locally produced ethnic shows on Sunday nights.

=== Repeaters and boosters ===
Although WKSU operates at relatively modest power for a full NPR member, its 908-foot (277 m) tower in Copley Township allows it to provide at least grade B coverage to most of Greater Cleveland to the north, with Cleveland itself getting a city-grade signal albeit with some weaknesses in places like Ohio City, Cleveland Heights and Lake County due to the region's topography. WKSU extends its reach via the following full-power satellites and on-channel boosters, which rebroadcast WKSU's four HD Radio signals. With the exception of WCPN, which is fully owned by Ideastream Public Media, all are directly owned by Kent State University and operated by Ideastream:

Call sign	Frequency	City of license	FID	ERP (W)	HAAT	Class	Transmitter coordinates	FCC info
WCPN	104.9 FM	Lorain, Ohio	70109	6,000	97.41 m (320 ft)	A	41°28′32.2″N 81°59′23.5″W	LMS
WKRJ	91.5 FM	New Philadelphia, Ohio	34042	2,000	75.83 m (249 ft)	A	40°33′50.2″N 81°31′4.4″W	LMS
WKRW	89.3 FM	Wooster, Ohio	34046	2,100	97.37 m (319 ft)	A	40°46′28.2″N 81°55′4.5″W	LMS
WKSU-FM1	89.7 FM	Kent, Ohio	776368	1,000	117.36 m (385 ft)	D	41°23′9.9″N 81°41′20.7″W	LMS
WKSU-FM2	89.7 FM	Kent, Ohio	776370	55	153.15 m (502 ft)	D	41°26′32.4″N 81°29′28.1″W	LMS
WKSV	89.1 FM	Thompson, Ohio	34040	50,000	140.9 m (462 ft)	B	41°41′34.2″N 81°2′50.3″W	LMS
WNRK	90.7 FM	Norwalk, Ohio	90728	4,000	121.98 m (400 ft)	A	41°10′50.2″N 82°23′20.6″W	LMS

Additionally, WKSU is simulcast over WCLV's HD3 subchannel and over WVIZ's 25.7 subchannel in an audio-only format.

=== Translators ===
WKSU also rebroadcasts to the following low-power translators:

Broadcast translators for WKSU
Call sign	Frequency	City of license	FID	ERP (W)	HAAT	Class	Transmitter coordinates	FCC info
W234CX	94.7 FM	Mansfield, Ohio	146397	38	45.22 m (148 ft)	D	40°47′26.2″N 82°30′22.6″W	LMS
W239AZ	95.7 FM	Ashland, Ohio	146601	80	26.18 m (86 ft)	D	40°51′39.2″N 82°16′46.6″W	LMS

=== Network maps ===
'"`UNIQ--templatestyles-000002AC-QINU`"'
- Grade A (60 dBu) signal contours for the WKSU network. Click on each contour to reveal details.
- '"`UNIQ--templatestyles-000002A7-QINU`"''"`UNIQ--templatestyles-000002AB-QINU`"'
  - '"`UNIQ--templatestyles-000002A8-QINU`"'
    Originating station and on-channel boosters
  - '"`UNIQ--templatestyles-000002A9-QINU`"'
    Full-power satellite stations
  - '"`UNIQ--templatestyles-000002AA-QINU`"'
    Low-power translators
'"`UNIQ--templatestyles-000002B3-QINU`"'
- Transmitter locations for the WKSU network. Click on each marker to reveal details.
- '"`UNIQ--templatestyles-000002AE-QINU`"''"`UNIQ--templatestyles-000002B2-QINU`"'
  - '"`UNIQ--templatestyles-000002AF-QINU`"'
    Originating station and on-channel boosters
  - '"`UNIQ--templatestyles-000002B0-QINU`"'
    Full-power satellite stations
  - '"`UNIQ--templatestyles-000002B1-QINU`"'
    Low-power translators

== Facilities and bureaus ==
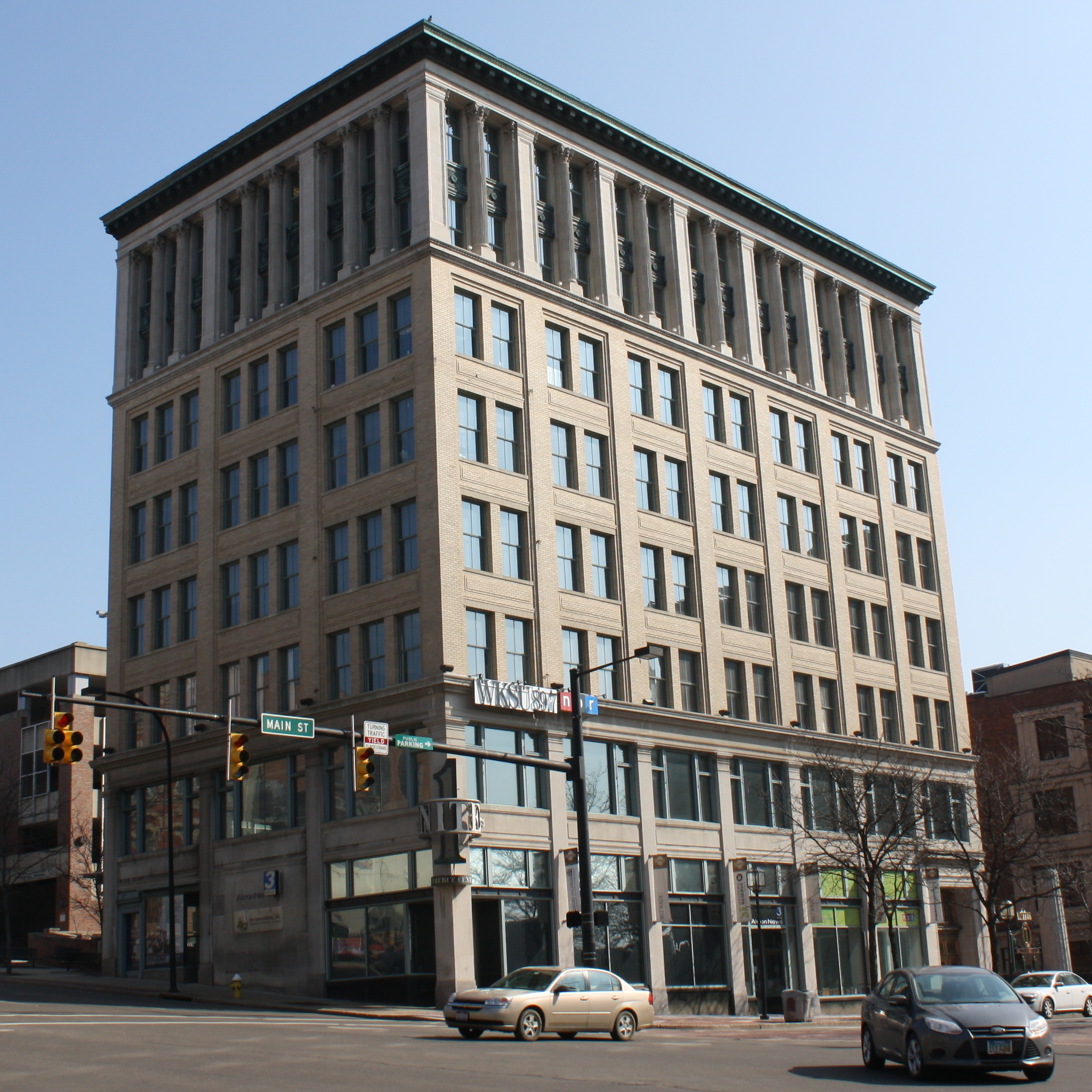
WKSU's former Akron news bureau at the United Building, Akron, Ohio

In addition to facilities at the Idea Center in Downtown Cleveland, WKSU maintains news bureaus in Akron and Canton, the latter based at the Canton Museum of Art. Additionally, Ideastream provides managerial support for Ohio Public Radio's Statehouse News Bureau in Columbus and is part of a consortium jointly operating The Ohio Channel (which offers a daily television simulcast of WKSU's The Sound of Ideas).

WKSU previously established a news bureau at the United Building in downtown Akron, sharing space with PBS member stations WNEO–WEAO (of which Kent State University is a part-owner) and Cleveland NBC affiliate WKYC. The arrangement was made in 2008 after WKYC ceased production of a daily Akron-oriented television newscast on local cable. After the United Building was slated for conversion into a boutique hotel, WKSU relocated the Akron bureau to the Akron Beacon Journal newsroom. WKSU had also operated a separate bureau in downtown Cleveland prior to the Ideastream merger from WKYC's newsroom.
