= East 9th–North Coast station =

Rapid transit station in Cleveland

North Coast
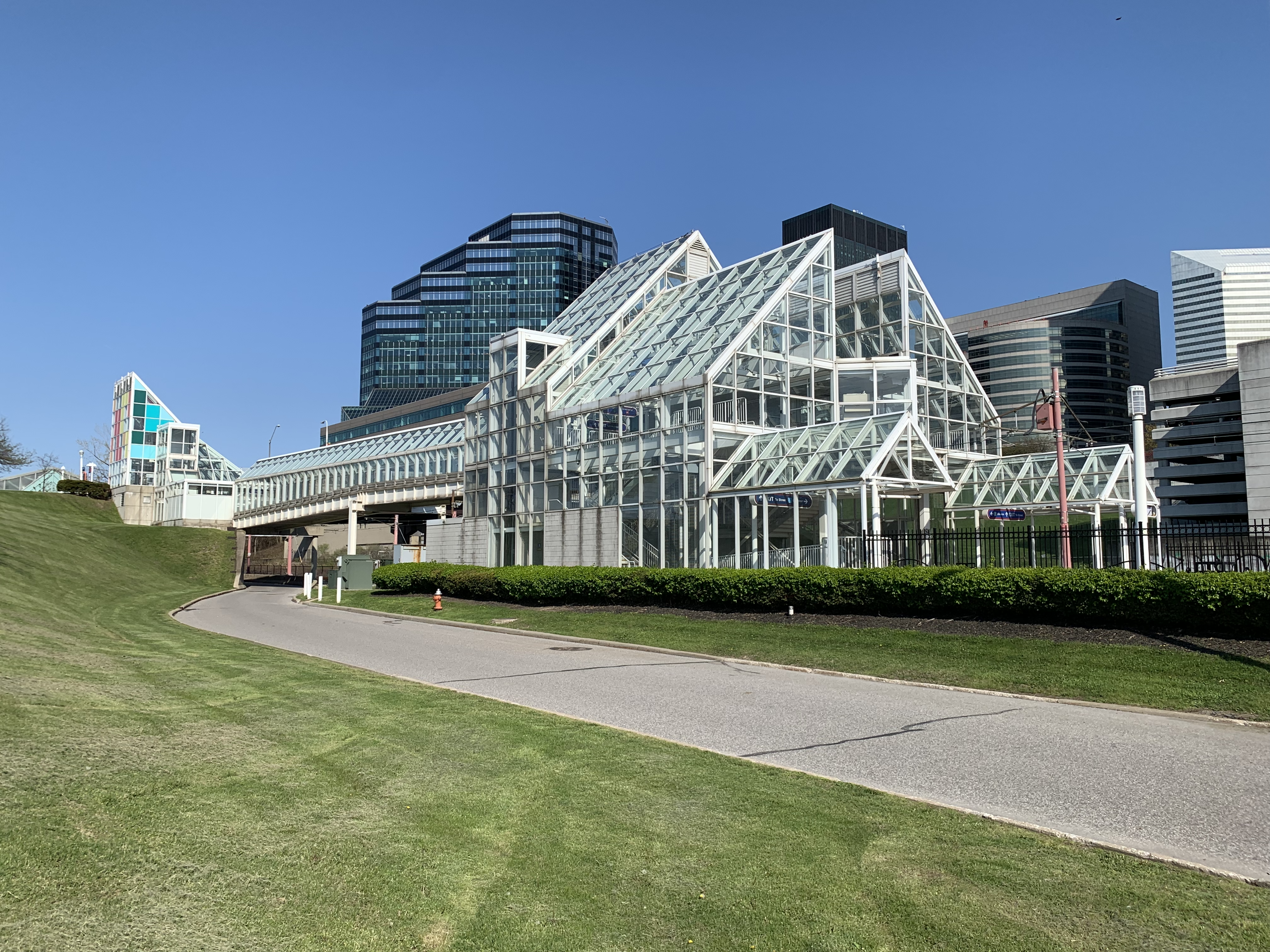
- East 9th–North Coast station in May 2023

General information
- Location: 1180 East 9th Street; Cleveland, Ohio
- Coordinates: 41°30′23″N 81°41′38″W
- Owner: Greater Cleveland Regional Transit Authority
- Platforms: 2 side platforms
- Tracks: 2
- Connections: Laketran: 10, 11, 12; Amtrak (at Cleveland Lakefront Station)

Construction
- Structure type: At-grade
- Parking: Paid parking nearby
- Cycle facilities: Racks
- Accessible: Yes

Other information
- Status: Unstaffed
- Website: riderta.com/facilities/northcoast

History
- Opened: July 10, 1996; 30 years ago

Services
Preceding station	Rapid Transit	Following station
Amtrak toward Tower City	Waterfront Line	South Harbor Terminus
Location

East 9th–North Coast station (signed as North Coast) is a station on the RTA Waterfront Line in Cleveland, Ohio. The station is located west of East 9th Street and serves the North Coast Harbor area, after which the station is named. The station also serves the northern portion of Downtown Cleveland, including Cleveland City Hall.

== History ==
The station opened on July 10, 1996, when light rail service was extended 2.2 miles (3.5 km) from Tower City along The Flats and along the Lake Erie waterfront. This extension was designated the Waterfront Line, although it is actually an extension of the Blue and Green Lines, as trains leaving this station toward Tower City continue along the Blue or Green Line routes to Shaker Heights.

The station was designed by the firm of Robert P. Madison International, founded by the prominent African American architect. It was designed to harmonize with the style of the nearby Rock and Roll Hall of Fame, for which the Madison firm was also associate architects. It features a glasswork display celebrating Cleveland's history designed by local artists Henry Halem and Brinsley Tyrell.

== Station layout ==
The station has two side platforms and a large glass shelter covers most of platform area. Each side has a mini-high platform which allow passengers with disabilities to access trains.

Unique for the Waterfront Line stations, there is also a mezzanine level with a footbridge connecting the station to East 9th Street and a fare collection booth. When the station is unstaffed, fares are collected on trains.

== Notable places nearby ==
- North Coast Harbor
- Rock and Roll Hall of Fame and Museum
- Great Lakes Science Center
- Steamship William G. Mather Museum
- North Point Office Building and Tower
- Willard Park
- Cleveland City Hall

== Artwork ==
When the station opened, it included three separate art projects incorporated into the design:

- A 49-foot porcelain mosaic tile rug called "Welcome Mat" is set in the floor of the station's entrance. Designed by local artist Angelica Pozo, it resembles an Oriental rug with its multiple borders around a separately designed inner area. The images in the mosaic involve the hand, which the artist chose to symbolize the hands of craftsman and skilled workers who built the city. A palm makes up the inner-design of one half of the rug, and the mat's middle border consists of a string of hands in different flesh tones to denote Cleveland's ethnic diversity clasped in a handshake, which, according to Pozo, represent "the cooperation and working together that helped Cleveland get where it is."
- A sculpture named "Transit Relief" was designed by members of the RAM design group, comprising Kahlil I. Pedizisai, Kevin Jerome Everson, E. Dominique Brown, and Johnny Coleman. It is an aluminum, multimedia relief sculpture that is part RTA bus-part RTA train. The two halves meet in the corner of a wall, but each stretches out about 8 feet (2.4 m) in an L formation along perpendicular walls. The windows of the vehicles are video monitors showing passing images along Cleveland's streets, such as youths shooting basketball in a park, shoppers scurrying through Public Square and even the train and bus drivers in various poses. Pedizisai noted, "We're creating a visual bibliography of Cleveland."
- The final piece of art is a glass wall designed by Henry Halem and Brinsley Tyrrell. The wall is 22 feet (6.7 m) wide and 10 feet (3.0 m) high. Four neon lights run within the wall and cast a soft glow on its image of an oil carrier. The carrier's body is made up of 14 panels, each of which depicts a story about Cleveland.

== Gallery ==
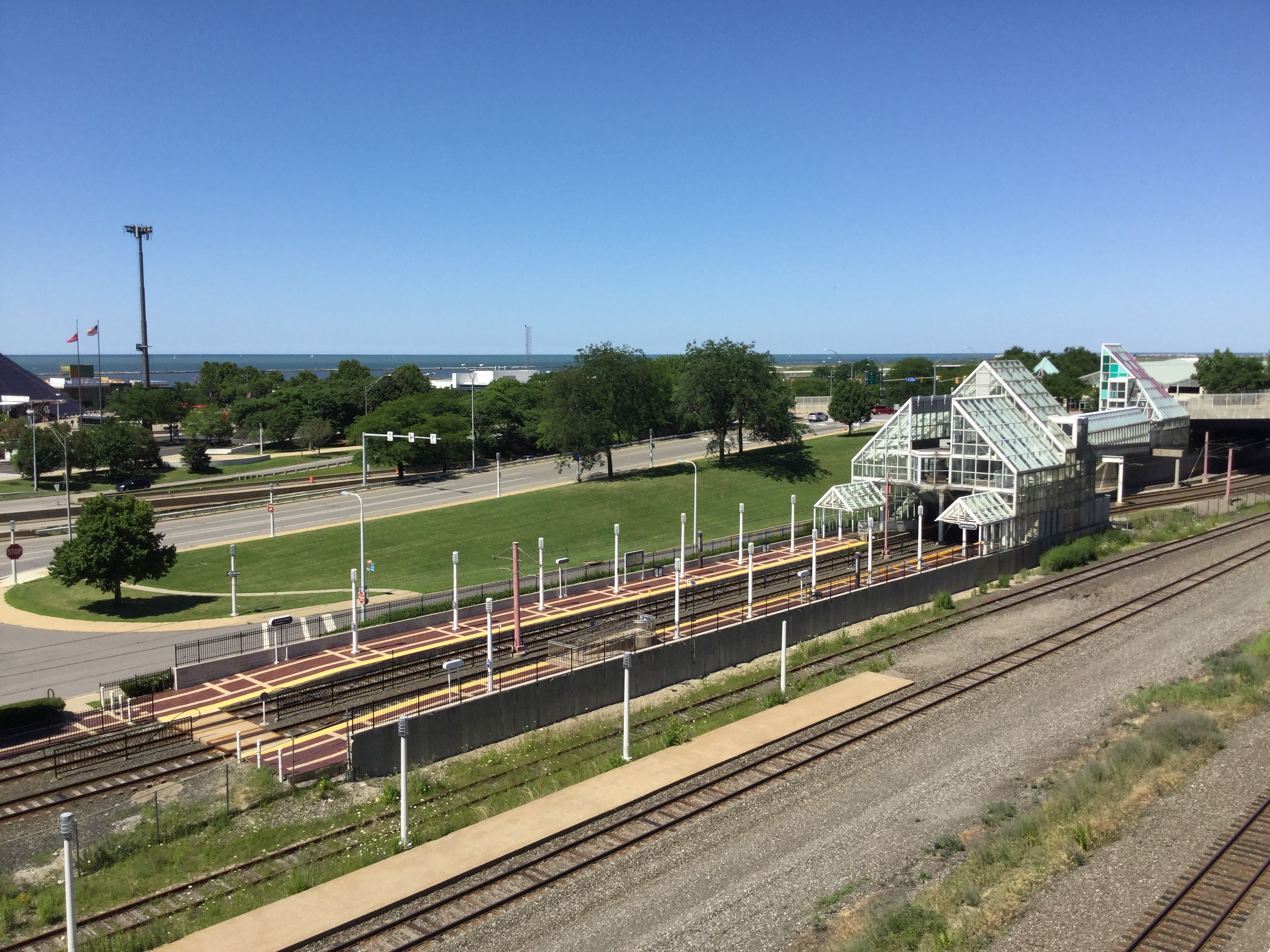
Station area

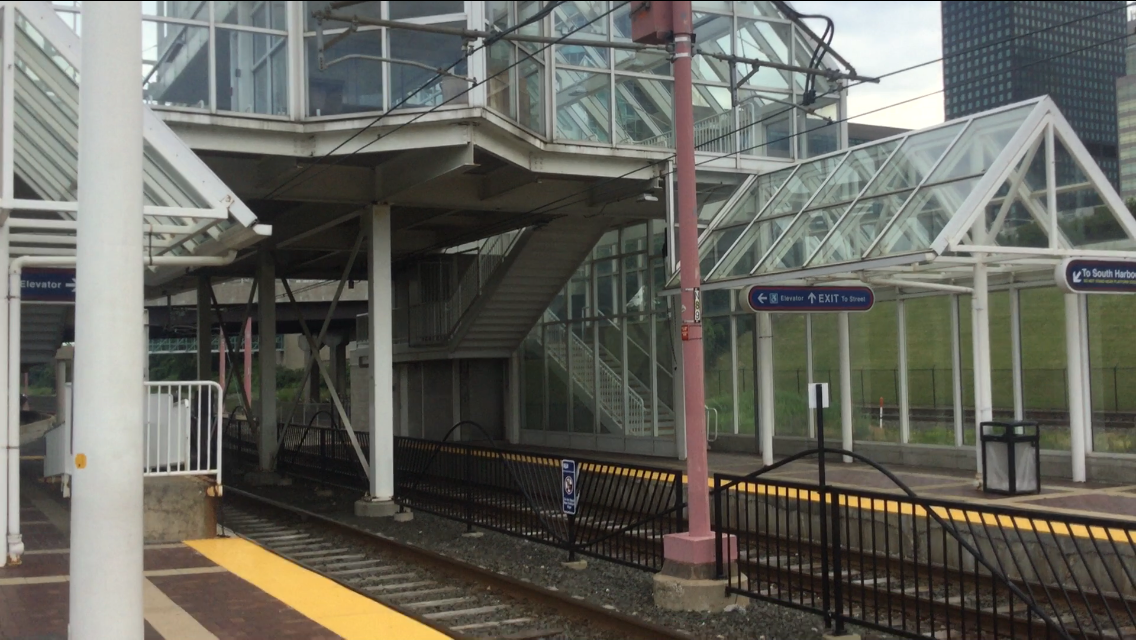
Station platform

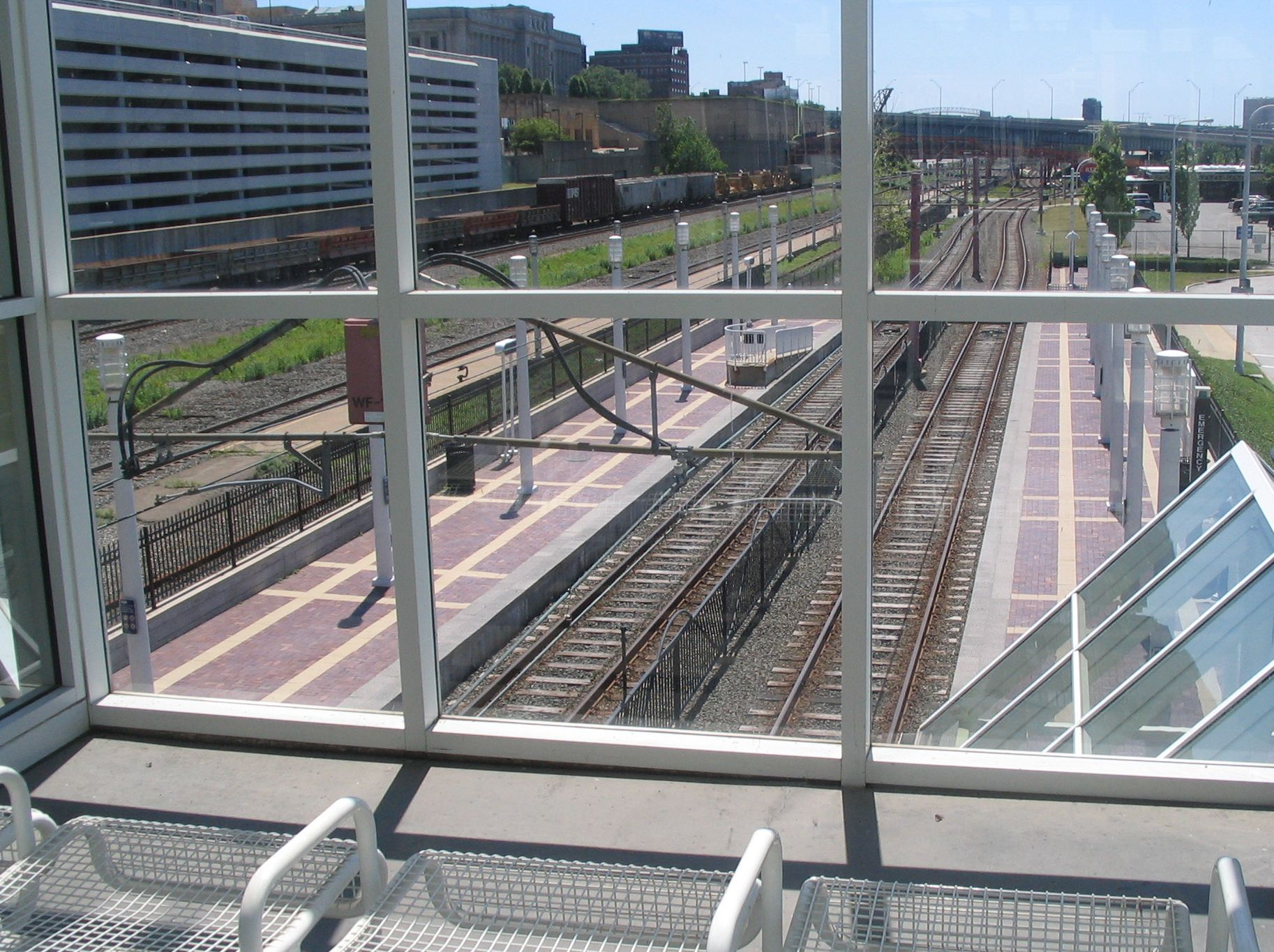
Station platforms from mezzanine

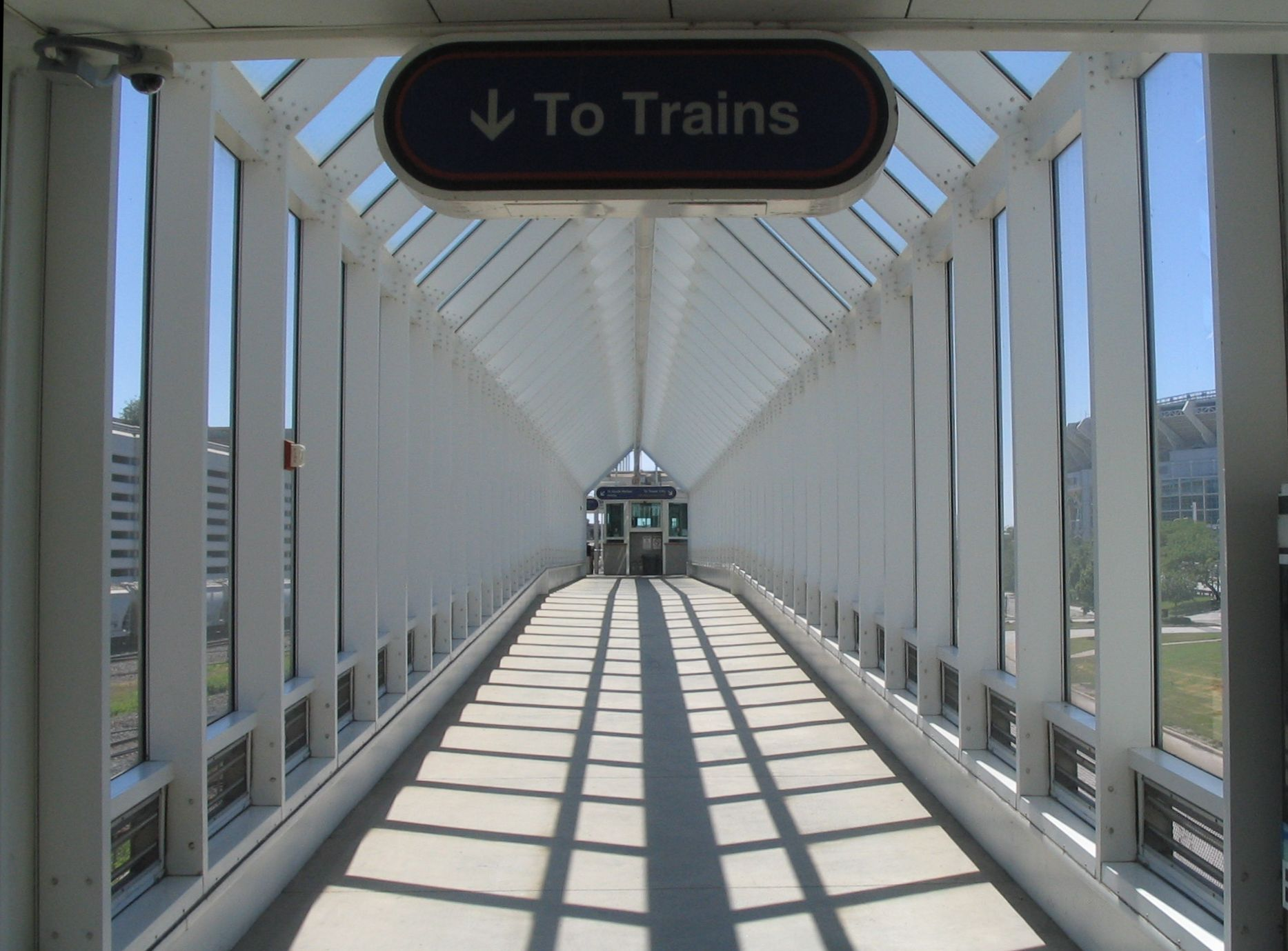
Bridge from East 9th Street entrance to mezzanine

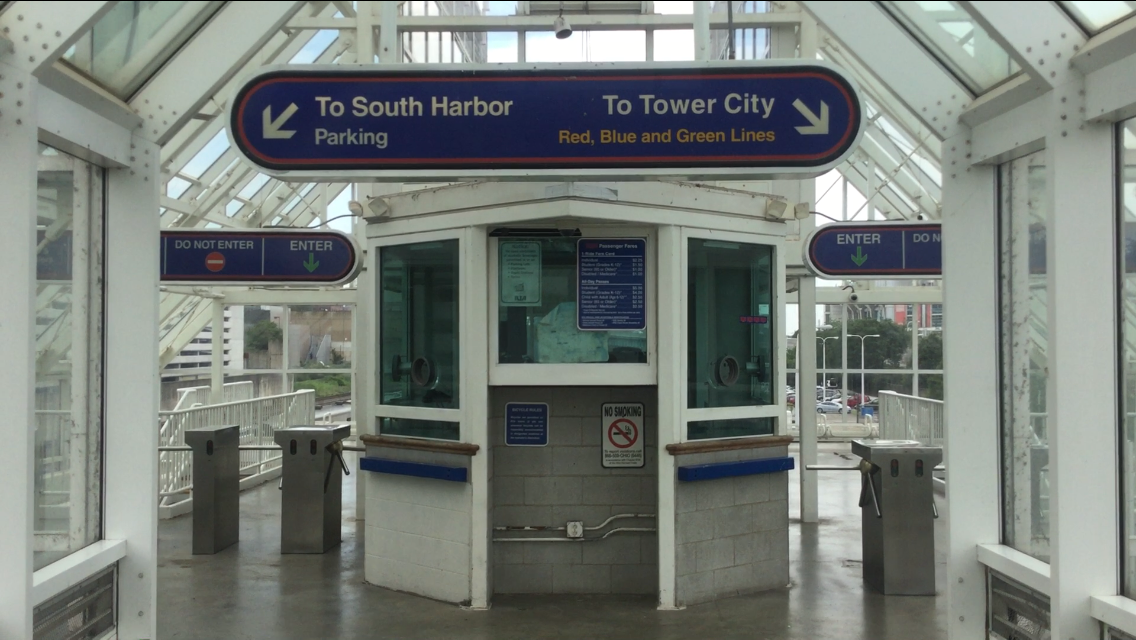
Turnstiles and fare booth on mezzanine

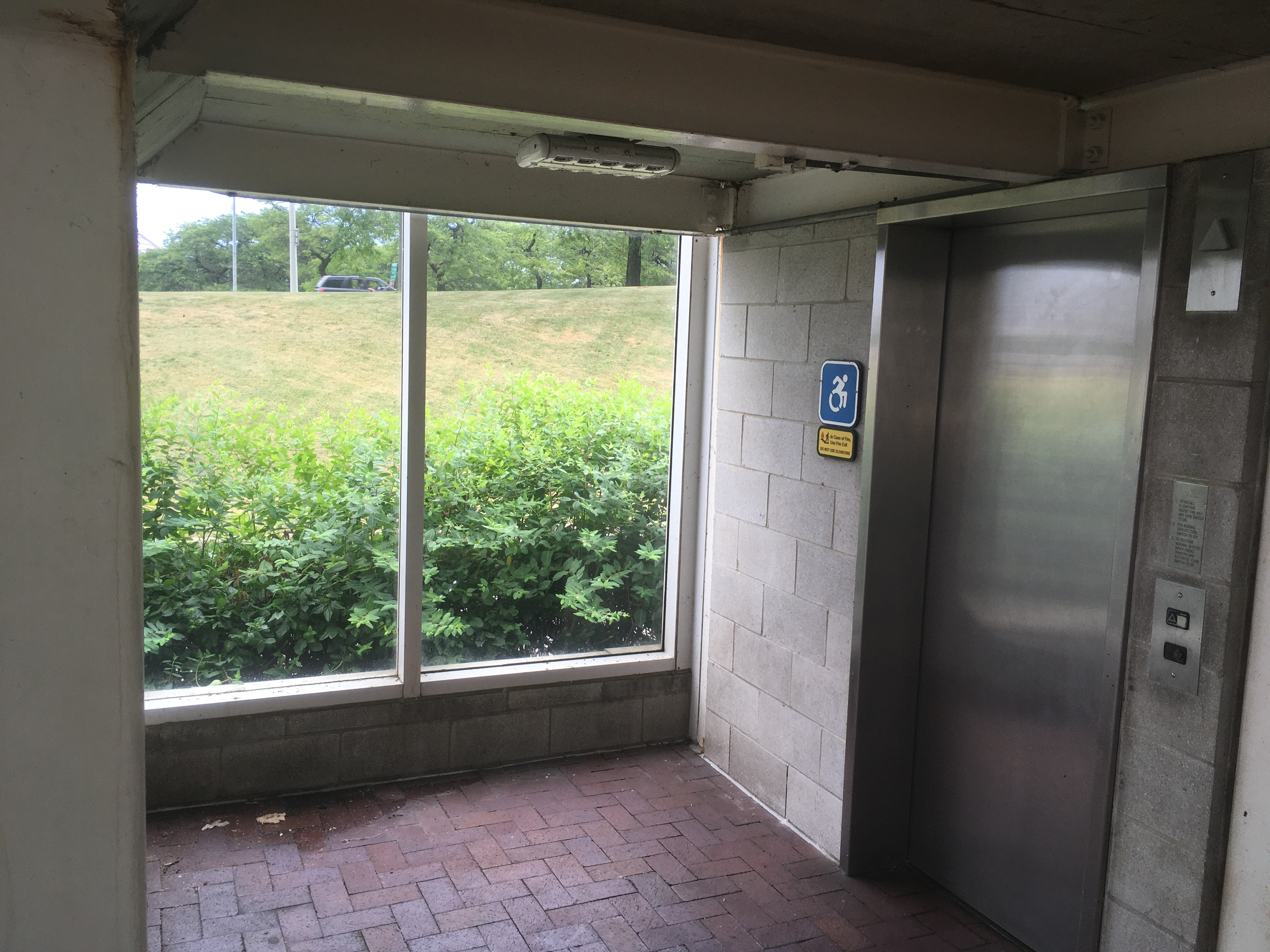
Inbound platform elevator

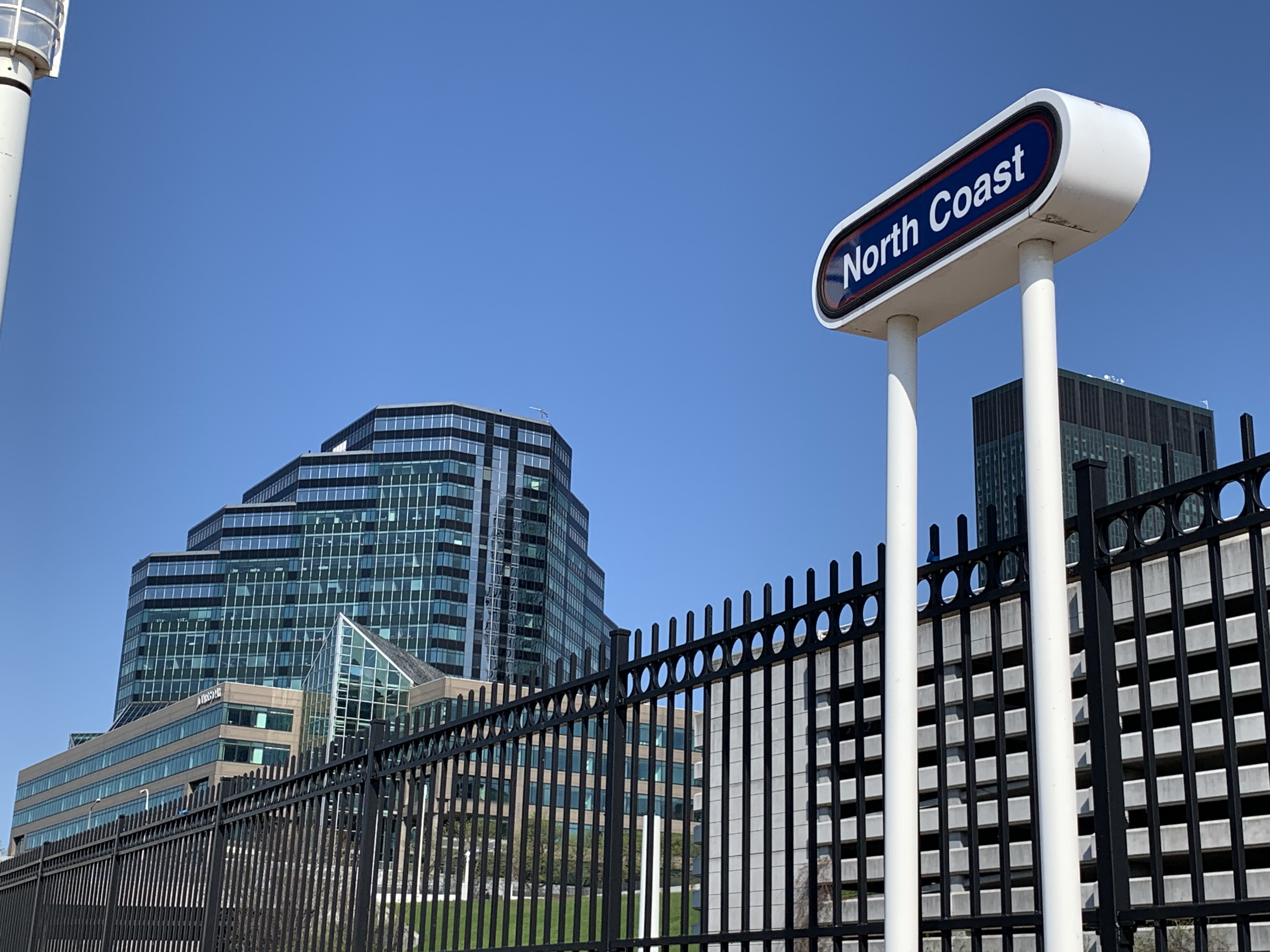
Station sign
