= Angelica Pozo =

Clay artist from Cleveland

Angélica Pozo is a clay artist from Cleveland. She is also an author, teacher, and exhibit curator.

== Life ==
Pozo is from New York City. She was born to Cuban and Puerto Rican parents. She earned her BFA from SUNY College of Ceramics, and her Masters of Fine Arts at the University of Michigan.

She then moved to Cleveland in 1984, and resides in Tremont, Cleveland. She is self-employed.

== Work ==
Pozo's art includes tile and sculptural studio work. She has also taught art for over 30 years. For her work, she was awarded an Individual Artist Fellowship by the Ohio Arts Council.

Pozo is known for the following public art commissions:

- "Marketplace/Meeting Place: An Urban Memorial", a mosaic tree planter/bench in Cleveland
- "Welcome Mat", a mosaic tile rug at the East 9th–North Coast station that represents Cleveland's ethnic diversity
- "Stephanie Tubbs Jones Memorial Wall" at University Circle
- tile wall in Quincy Park in Fairfax, Cleveland illustrating historical community photographs from 1879-2006
- tile sculptures at Hudson Middle School in Hudson, Ohio

== Collections and exhibitions ==
Pozo's work is available in the following collections:

- American Craft Museum, New York City
- Museum of Arts and Design, New York City
- Private collection for LeBron James

She has been involved with the following exhibitions:

- International Ceramic Public Art Exhibition, 1998, Taipei, Taiwan
- "21st Century Ceramics in the United States & Canada", 2003
- 2019 exhibit at Kent State University

== Selected publications ==
- Mayer, Robert A; Angelica Pozo (January 1995). "Angelica Pozo's Airport Station". Ceramics Monthly.
- Angelica Pozo (June 1995). "Four Architectural Spaces: Private Space Forest Shrine: Penumbra". Studio Potter. 23 (2).
- Angelica Pozo (2003). "Tile Making: One Approach, Plus A Recipe For Potato Salad". Penland Book of Ceramics, Master Classes in Ceramic Technique. New York, NY: Lark Books, division of Sterling Publishing, Co. ISBN 9781579903381.
- Angelica Pozo (Spring 2005). Making and Installing Handmade Tile. New York, NY: Lark Books, division of Sterling Publishing Co. ISBN 9781600594090.
- Angelica Pozo (2010). Ceramics for Beginners: Surfaces, Glazes, and Firings. Lark. ISBN 9781600592454.
- Angelica Pozo (Actor), Jennifer Poellot Harnetty (Director) (2011). Creative Tile Making (DVD). American Ceramic Society. Event occurs at 120 minutes. ASIN B005E0QE8I.
