= Julio Cesar Pino =

American professor of Latin American history

- Julio César Pino
- Born: 1960 (age 65–66); Havana, Cuba

Academic background
- Education: University of California, Los Angeles (BA, 1984; MA, 1987; PhD, 1991)
- Thesis: "Family and Favela: The Reproduction of Poverty in Rio de Janeiro" (1997)

Academic work
- Discipline: Latin American history
- Institutions: Kent State University
- Main interests: Latin America; Third World; Islam; History of race
- Website: https://www.kent.edu/history/profile/Julio-Cesar-Pino

Julio Cesar Pino is a former tenured Associate Professor of History at Kent State University in Kent, Ohio.

== Biography ==
Julio Cesar Pino was born in Havana, Cuba in 1960. He moved to Los Angeles with his family in 1968.

Pino received his Ph.D. in History from the University of California, Los Angeles in 1991.

== Political controversies ==
Pino has been involved in a series of controversies relating to American foreign policy, Islam, suicide bombing, jihad, and Israel. These include a 2012 newspaper column praising the actions of the terrorist who carried out the Kiryat Yovel supermarket bombing, and a letter critical of American policy that read, in part, "You attack, and continue to attack, us everywhere... The ill done to the Muslim nations must be requited." In 2011 he was investigated by the Secret Service after calling president Bush a "cocaine cowboy." In November 2007, Kent State demoted the chair of the history department for failing to follow procedure when it authorized a fully paid, mid-semester, 6-week trip to the United Arab Emirates where Pino wished to study Arabic. Pino was recalled to his teaching post before completing the 6 weeks. In 2011 a public controversy ensued after Pino shouted "Death to Israel" during a talk given at Kent State by Ishmael Khaldi, an Israeli diplomat. University President Lester Lefton condemned Pino's behavior as "reprehensible, and an embarrassment to our university," defending Pino's right to free speech but finding his behavior, "deplorable." Pino has been involved in a series of anti-Israel actions, writing an open letter in 2014 asserting of Israeli Jews that, "The Chosen drain the blood of innocents."

=== 2016 FBI investigation ===
Julio Pino returned to the headlines in January 2016 when information surfaced that the FBI was interviewing students and professors for possible ties between Pino and ISIS. Pino denied the allegations against him in an email to Inside Higher Ed, saying, "My only commitment is to serve my students as guided by the light of knowledge. I have no ties to any political organization, nor do I recruit for any cause." A university spokesperson confirmed that he is still teaching at this time. Kent State said in a statement that it is cooperating with an ongoing investigation, and said the FBI had assured it there was no threat to the campus. Pino said neither the FBI nor Homeland Security has notified him of any sort of investigation.

=== 2018 charges ===
Pino was charged in April 2018 by federal prosecutors with one count of making false statements to law enforcement, relative to a separate 2016 investigation into his connections with a man in St. Louis who had threatened a family court judge. Pino plead guilty to the charges, and was sentenced to 5 months in prison followed by 5 months of house arrest and 3 years of probation. He stated that he had already planned to retire from the university at the conclusion of the Spring 2018 semester.
