= Black Squirrel Radio =

Internet radio station in Kent, Ohio

- Kent, Ohio; United States
- Broadcast area: Akron metro area; Northeast Ohio; Worldwide
- Frequency: Online only
- Branding: Black Squirrel Radio

Programming
- Language: English
- Format: College radio; Urban contemporary; Rock music
- Affiliations: UWIRE

Ownership
- Owner: Kent State University

History
- Founded: 1964
- First air date: Fall 2005
- Former names: WKSU-AM (1964–1975); WKSR (1975–2005)
- Former frequencies: 730 kHz carrier current (1964–1999)

Links
- Webcast: Listen live
- Website: blacksquirrelentertainment.com

Black Squirrel Radio (BSR) is a non-commercial internet radio station run by students of Kent State University, originating from the university's campus in Kent, Ohio, and broadcasting exclusively online. Black Squirrel Radio is overseen by faculty from Kent State University's Journalism and Mass Communication program. While relaunching under this name in the fall of 2005, Black Squirrel Radio can be traced back directly to 1964 as an unlicensed carrier current AM station on the university's campus and is intertwined with the establishment and history of the university's licensed non-commercial educational radio station, WKSU.

== History ==
Established on October 2, 1950, the university's WKSU-FM originally served as an outlet for Kent State students to broadcast; prior to 1950, the university's Radio Workshop program produced original programming for WADC from 1940 to 1943, and on WAKR from 1945 to 1950. WKSU-FM supplanted an unlicensed carrier current station at 560 kHz bearing the "WKSU-AM" name, which launched in 1949 airing rebroadcasts of the Radio Workshop's WAKR programs along with campus news. Due to a lack of FM receivers on campus, the carrier current "WKSU-AM" was reactivated in 1953 as a simulcast of the licensed radio station, but was discontinued at an unknown date.

Carrier current radio was revived in 1964 with a third iteration of "WKSU-AM" at 730 kHz again direct simulcasting WKSU-FM, but by January 18, 1965, took on a distinct program schedule. Both "WKSU-AM" and WKSU-FM operated under the auspices of an advisory board; while students had more responsibility at "WKSU-AM", students could submit program ideas for the FM station to the board. By 1971, "WKSU-AM" was broadcasting around-the-clock, affiliating with both American Contemporary Radio and Drake-Chenault's Hit Parade music service. To lessen confusion with WKSU-FM, which became an affiliate of National Public Radio (NPR) in 1973, "WKSU-AM" renamed itself as WKSR in January 1976.

While both WKSU-FM and WKSR were located at the university's Music and Speech Building, the relationship between the two entities became strained as the 1980s began. WKSU-FM's controversial cancellation of the late-night progressive rock/freeform program Fresh Air on December 30, 1981, removed the last student-produced show from the station entirely. At the same time, WKSU-FM ended a practice of hiring talent from WKSR deemed worthy; as WKSU-FM had already been transitioning from block programming to public radio, the need for the station to rely on volunteers and students lessened, with professionals taking their place. Due to issues that affected the closed-circuit on-campus transmissions, WKSR frequently suffered signal outages throughout the 1980s and early 1990s and was often referred to as "roommate radio".

WKSR was reorganized in 1992 and recognized as a student organization at the university; later in the year, WKSU-FM moved from the Music and Speech Building to a custom-built facility, with WKSR remaining. By 1999, WKSR abandoned carrier current AM entirely and began streaming over a Kent State campus cable channel; at the same time, WKSR also began broadcasting via internet radio. After discovering the existence of a licensed radio station in Loretto, Tennessee, that already uses the WKSR-FM call sign, WKSR was preemptively renamed "Black Squirrel Radio" as the Fall 2005 semester began, a nod to black squirrels common around Kent, Ohio, and the campus proper; faculty advisor Marianne Warzinski viewed the rebranding as a way to expand the station's focus beyond on-campus residents and saw it as "a new start, than a new station".

Black Squirrel Radio now calls Franklin Hall its home. The station was formerly located in the Music and Speech Building.

== Programming ==
Urban contemporary, rock and "local music" all account for the programming on the station. Black Squirrel Radio's mascot, "URL the Squirrel", is an acronym for "Urban-Rock-Local", in addition to the Uniform Resource Locator, a pun alluding to the station's exclusive online format. BSR is an affiliate of UWIRE, which gathers, edits, and re-distributes student-created content, and broadcasts news at 15 minutes before the hour and at 15 minutes past the hour.
