= Henry Halem =

American glass artist

- Born: 1938 (age 87–88); New York, New York, United States
- Education: BFA Rhode Island School of Design; MFA George Washington University; University of Wisconsin–Madison
- Known for: Glass art
- Website: www.henryhalem.com

Henry Halem is an American glass artist and educator based in Ohio. A native of New York City, Halem resides in Kent, Ohio.

== Background ==
Halem was born in New York City in 1938 and grew up in The Bronx. He received his Bachelor of Fine Arts degree in ceramics from the Rhode Island School of Design in 1960 and his Master of Fine Arts degree from George Washington University in 1968. Halem also did postgraduate work at the University of Wisconsin–Madison under Harvey Littleton. He founded the glass program at Kent State University in 1969, teaching at KSU until his retirement in 1998.

== Artwork ==
Many of Halem's works are inspired by social and political events. Arriving at Kent State in 1969, he was present during the Kent State shootings in 1970, and created several "blinded" glass sculptures that used a combination of plaster face molds and melted white glass. He has also created cast glass works related to the Holocaust, the September 11 attacks, the Iraq War, and other events.

== Collections ==
Halem has work in the collections of the Cleveland Museum of Art, the Detroit Institute of Art, the Smithsonian National Museum of American History, the Smithsonian American Art Museum, the Philabaum Gallery in Tucson, Arizona, the Philadelphia Museum of Art, and the Corning Museum of Glass. He also has commissioned work displayed in Cleveland at the East 9th–North Coast station rapid transit station and at the Ferro Corporation headquarters, along with a fused glass installation at Ohio University Southern Campus in Ironton, Ohio.

== Honors and awards ==
Halem received the Ohio Governor's Award for the Arts in 1994 and the Kent State University President's Medal for Outstanding Achievement in 1998. He is a co-founder of the Glass Art Society and served as the organization's first president, receiving its Lifetime Achievement Award at the 2008 annual conference.
