= Beverly J. Warren =

American education administrator

12th President of Kent State University
- In office July 1, 2014 – July 1, 2019
- Preceded by: Lester Lefton
- Succeeded by: Todd Diacon

Personal details
- Education: University of North Carolina; Southern Illinois University; University of Alabama; Auburn University
- Profession: College administrator, Educator
- Website: www.kent.edu/president/president-ceo-beverly-warren

Beverly J. Warren is an American higher education administrator who was appointed the 12th president of Kent State University in Kent, Ohio, United States; she replaced Lester A. Lefton in July 2014. She was a provost and senior vice president of Virginia Commonwealth University (VCU) before coming to Kent State University. Kent State University trustees will extend President Beverly Warren's contract through 2020. She announced her decision to step down as president in an email sent to students on October 23, 2018, stating that she would not be renewing her contract for the 2020-21 academic year. Her tenure as president ended July 1, 2019 with Todd Diacon succeeding her.

== Education ==
She received her Bachelor of Science (BS) degree from the University of North Carolina and Master of Science degree from Southern Illinois University. She received two doctorates: an Ed.D. in administration of higher education from the University of Alabama and a Ph.D. in exercise physiology from Auburn University.

== Experience ==
Previously, Warren served as a professor and chair at Lander University in Greenwood, South Carolina. She also served as an associate professor and director of graduate programs at Appalachian State University in Boone, North Carolina.
