= Lester Lefton =

American psychologist (born 1946)

11th President of Kent State University
- In office July 1, 2006 – July 1, 2014
- Preceded by: Carol Cartwright
- Succeeded by: Beverly J. Warren

Personal details
- Born: July 27, 1946 (age 80) Brookline, Massachusetts, U.S.
- Spouse: Linda Lefton
- Education: Northeastern University; University of Rochester
- Profession: Educator

Lester A. Lefton (born July 27, 1946) is an American academic and higher education administrator. He was the President of Kent State University (2006–2014). He has 35 years of experience in higher education, having served for 25 years at a public institution and nine at private institutions. During his career, he has been a psychology professor, dean and provost, as well as a psychology textbook author.

Of Jewish heritage, Lefton was born in Brookline, Massachusetts, and completed his bachelor's in psychology from Northeastern University in Boston in 1969. He earned his doctorate in experimental psychology, specializing in visual perception and focusing on cognitive psychology in 1974 from the University of Rochester, where he held a U.S. Public Health Service Predoctoral Fellowship.

== Academic career ==
In 1972, he became an assistant professor at the University of South Carolina, associate professor in 1975, and full professor in 1980. Lefton served as chair of the psychology department (1986–1994) and dean of the College of Liberal Arts for three years (1994–1997).

He moved to George Washington University in Washington, D.C., where he served as dean of the Columbian College of Arts and Sciences for four years (1997–2001).

Lefton was senior vice president and provost of Tulane University for five years (2001–2006).

Lefton has published many peer-refereed research articles. He has been a fellow of the American Psychological Association. He is described as an advocate for undergraduate education. Lefton has 36 years of university teaching experience, and his introductory psychology textbook, now in its ninth edition, is used in college classrooms.

== Kent State President ==
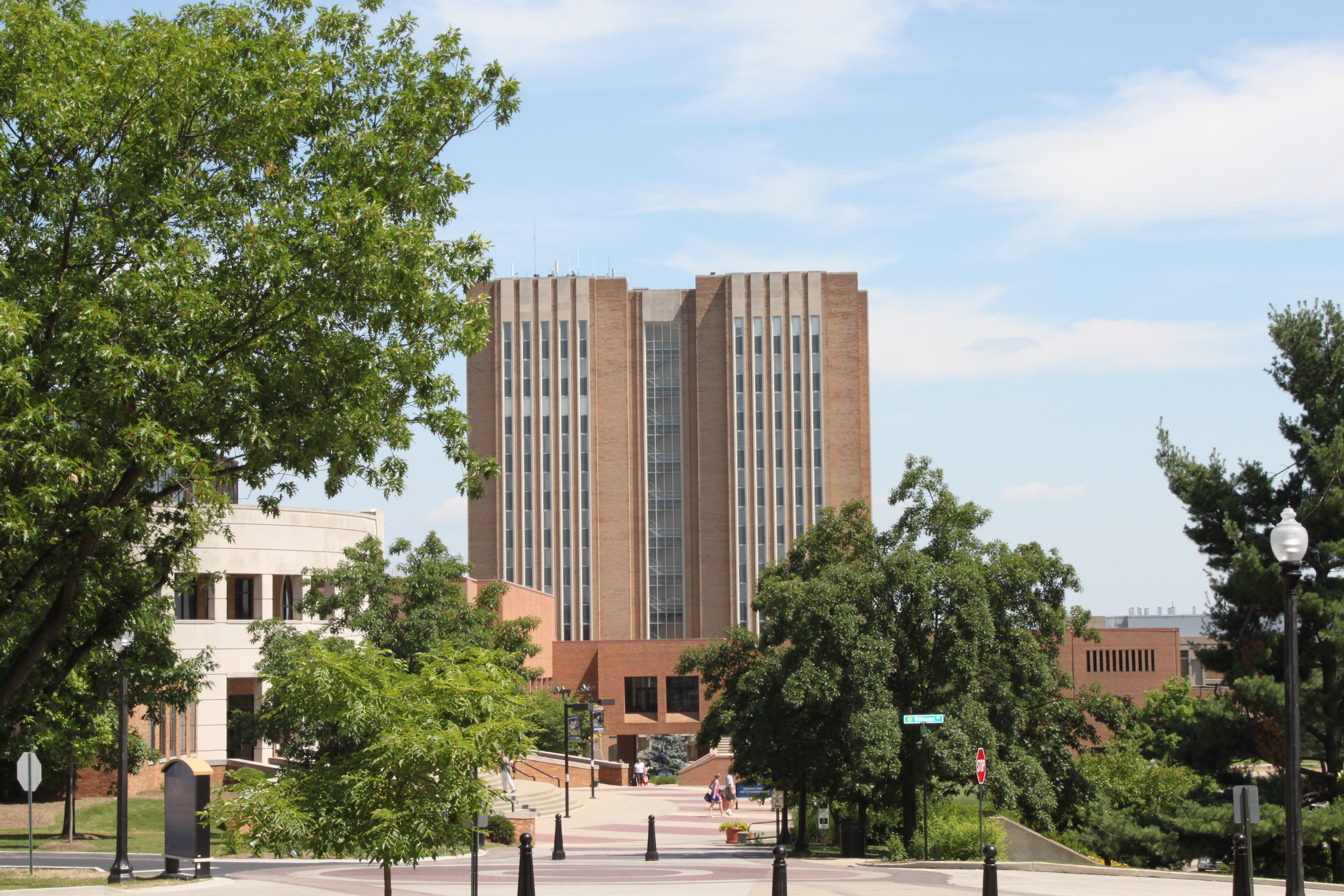
The Lefton Esplanade at Kent State University was named after Lester Lefton.

Named Kent State president in 2006, Lefton oversaw one of the nation's largest university systems and the second largest university in the state of Ohio. Kent State's eight campuses provide more than 280 academic programs to a record 41,300 undergraduate and graduate students. He earned $520,000 a year, plus up to 20 percent bonus, retirement benefits, a housing allowance, automobile, entertainment, deferred annuity, etc.

Among the highlights of his presidency he:

- worked to streamline the path to graduation for students (e.g., simplification of Liberal Education Requirements) as part of a heightened emphasis on student recruitment and retention.
- created a broad-based Commission on Inclusion and, on its recommendation, created the university's first Vice President for Diversity position.
- intensified emphasis on international programs and experiences, including agreements with leading universities in China and other parts of the world.
- set new goals for faculty research that resulted in significant increases in the number of grant proposals submitted by faculty and extramural funding received for faculty research.
- spearheaded a comprehensive review of the university's financial model, resulting in a change to a decentralized Responsibility Center Management financial system.
- played a significant role in cultivating a new era of cooperation between the university and the City of Kent and the redevelopment of downtown Kent.
- agreed to donate his 2009 raise to a scholarship fund to help students during the recession.
- helped keep high-tech company AlphaMicron in Kent by bringing the firm to the university-operated Centennial Research Park. The company applies research in liquid crystals to create new products.
- oversaw the largest enrollment of students in Kent State history—a record 41,300 at all eight Kent State campuses—for the fall 2010 semester.
- Led the acquisition of Ohio College of Podiatric Medicine, Ohio's only podiatry school, now known as the Kent State University College of Podiatric Medicine
- broke the institution's fundraising record three years in a row and raised more than $40 million from donors in single year for the first time during the fiscal year that ended June 30, 2011.
- Recognizing that students need and deserve first-class classrooms, laboratories, stages and other facilities to successfully compete for jobs, internships and advanced education, the university has developed a culture of philanthropy and fundraising that supports Kent State's already strong commitment to capital improvements that enhance teaching and learning. Recent facilities improvements include the Roe Green Center for the School of Theatre and Dance, a $22 million renovation of historic Franklin Hall that transformed it into one of the nation's leading training grounds for aspiring reporters, editors, producers, photographers, videographers and designers, and the Air Traffic Control Center in Van Deusen Hall that aid the university as it trains air traffic control students to help fill the Federal Aviation Administration's need for more than 14,500 air traffic control specialists between now and 2018.
- Under Lefton's leadership, Kent State established a College of Public Health, the second one in Ohio, to meet the state's and nation's growing needs for public health professionals. Kent State graduated its first class of students from the College of Public Health in May 2011.
- He led the university when it was named one of the top 200 universities in the world by Times Higher Education of London. and received a coveted spot in the first tier list of Best National Universities by U.S. News.
- Lefton created the Presidential Speaker Series to bring big-name speakers to Kent State. Trey Ratcliff, a photographer with a popular travel blog, Stuck In Customs, kicked off the series with a talk in March 2012. Holocaust survivor Elie Wiesel is scheduled to appear as part of the series in April 2013.

Besides having served as Kent State president, Lefton is active on the boards of NorTech and the Greater Akron Chamber, and is a member of Leadership Cleveland's Class of 2008. During 2007, he served on the Northeast Ohio Universities Collaboration and Innovation Study Commission, which was created by the Ohio General Assembly. The Commission submitted a wide range of recommendations to the Ohio Legislature and the Ohio Board of Regents about ways to improve quality, collaborations and efficiency among the region's public colleges and universities.

Lefton also upholds the university's role as a regional cultural resource through service on the boards of public television station Channels 45/49 and the Musical Arts Association of the Cleveland Orchestra.

Lefton has been active in a number of national higher education organizations.

At the national level, Lefton serves on the American Council on Education's (ACE) Commission on Effective Leadership. The commission advises the ACE's Center for Effective Leadership, which provides a variety of leadership and professional-development programs for presidents and other higher education administrators.

Lefton resides in Kent, Ohio with his wife, Linda. They have two grown daughters and three grandsons. Mrs. Lefton is an attorney who served as a state prosecutor in South Carolina and was an academic advisor for pre-law majors at George Washington and Tulane universities. She serves on the board of the Pediatric Palliative Care Center at Akron Children's Hospital and is a member of the Women's Committee of the Cleveland Orchestra. Mrs. Lefton is a 2008 graduate of Leadership Portage County.

== Downtown Kent redevelopment ==
Shortly after beginning his presidency, Lefton, working with city manager of Kent, Ohio, Dave Ruller, began an ongoing effort to redevelop the City Kent's, with the goal of drawing the city and the university closer and encouraging economic growth. Lefton and Ruller's $110 million mixed-use development efforts have spurred new office, retail, entertainment and residential spaces, targeted to the 28,000 students and 3,000 faculty members from the university. The downtown redevelopment also includes new facility spaces for the university, including a $16 million, 80,000-square-foot hotel and conference center, scheduled to open in June 2013. Additionally, a new multimodal transit facility, providing a transfer point for buses and visitors in the area, the Kent Central Gateway, is scheduled to be completed in July 2013. The redevelopment project is said to be the largest of its kind in Kent's 208-year history.

Lefton has also influenced Kent State University's campus-edge development, with plans to construct a cross-campus pedestrian esplanade leading from campus to the center of the city of Kent. Plans are underway to construct a new $45 million College of Architecture and Environmental Design building along one section of the esplanade.

== Spending controversy ==
Lefton has come under scrutiny for his expense accounts charged to the university. Between July 2006 and July 2007 Lefton expensed $36,741.93 on entertainment and $44,249.34 on travel. In a Sep 26, 2007 editorial in the Akron Beacon Journal Lefton was criticized for extensive travel to Europe a portion of which was charged to the university, as well as hiring two additional vice presidents during a time when university tuition and fees increased for students.

== Other controversy ==
Further controversy in 2007 included an agreement to pay $88,000 for a vice president to pursue a doctorate at Case Western Reserve University. This came at a time when the university was raising student tuition and was of further concern because the same degree could be earned at Kent State University.
