= Todd Diacon =

American college administrator, educator (born 1959)

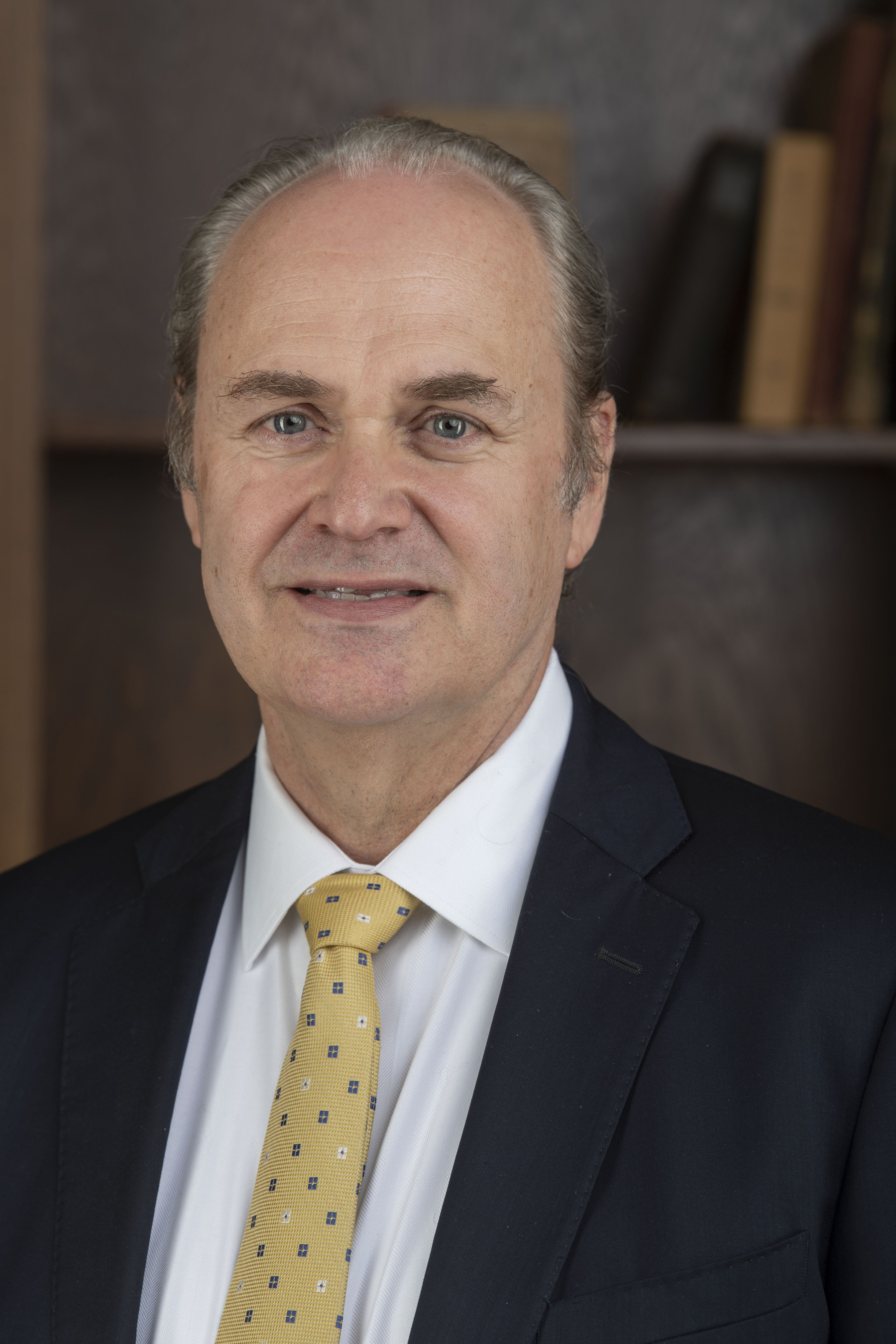
- Diacon in 2019

13th President of Kent State University
- Incumbent
- Assumed office July 1, 2019
- Preceded by: Beverly J. Warren

Personal details
- Born: 1959 (age 66–67) Wellington, Kansas, U.S.
- Education: Southwestern College (Kansas) (BA); University of Wisconsin-Madison (MA, PhD)
- Website: www.kent.edu/president

Academic background
- Education: University of Wisconsin-Madison
- Thesis: Capitalists and fanatics: Brazil's Contestado Rebellion, 1912–1916 (1987)

Academic work
- Institutions: University of Tennessee, Knoxville; University of Massachusetts Amherst; Kent State University

Todd Diacon (born 1959) is an American college administrator and educator serving as the 13th President of Kent State University in Kent, Ohio (U.S.). He previously served as the provost and senior vice president of Kent State.

== Education ==
Diacon was born in 1959. He received his B.A. degree from Southwestern College (Kansas), M.A., and Ph.D. from University of Wisconsin-Madison.

== Career ==
Diacon served as an executive vice president and provost at Kent State University, deputy chancellor at the University of Massachusetts Amherst and Vice Provost at the University of Tennessee, Knoxville.

On April 28, 2019, Diacon was appointed the 13th president of Kent State, effective July 1, 2019.
