= Barbara Bosworth =

American photographer

Barbara Bosworth (born 1953) is an American artist, educator, and photographer. She works primarily with a large-format, 8x10 view camera and focuses on the relationship between humans and nature. Bosworth's works have been included in magazines, journals, books and permanent collections, and shown in solo exhibits nationally and internationally. In 1985, she won a Guggenheim fellowship for her photographic work.

== Early life and education ==
Bosworth was born in 1953 in Cleveland, Ohio, and grew up in Novelty, Ohio, surrounded by trees, plants, and the outdoors.

She studied at Bowling Green State University, where she received her B.A. in Fine Arts in 1975. She earned an M.F.A. in photography at Rochester Institute of Technology in 1983.

== Teaching career ==
Bosworth worked briefly as a visiting instructor at Ohio University in Athens, Ohio, before joining the photography faculty at the Massachusetts College of Art and Design in Boston, Massachusetts in 1984. She has been professor and Chair of the Photography Department at Massachusetts College of Art.

== Work ==
External videos
- “Barbara Bosworth - Slow Looking”, San Francisco Museum of Modern Art

Much of Bosworth's photographic work focuses on landscapes and trees. She creates her views of the natural world using a large-format film camera, exploring subtle relations between humans and landscapes, "unfolding a personal and spiritual connection to the world around us." According to Andy Grundberg, writing in Grand Street, her peers in landscape photography include Laura McPhee, Lois Connor, Terry Evans, Linda Halverson, and Mary Peck, among others.

She spent several months intensively photographing the New England Trail, and more than 14 years visiting and photographing large trees from the National Register.

In other photographs such as Indigo Bunting she captures fleeting moments of connection between birds and humans, "incredibly intimate moment[s] of contact" with the tiny creatures appearing "exceptionally vulnerable." Bosworth documents the American landscape and how it is affected by humans.

Bosworth captures details using a view camera, and she often creates diptychs and triptychs from a set of exposures, expanding the area of her images. In her series Birds and Other Angels, the triptych format places her photographs of birds and humans within the wider scope of the forest surrounding them. Although Bosworth works in color, she also frequently shoots in black and white, intentionally limiting the image to forms shown in tones of grey, undistracted by color. In her twenty-year retrospective Natural Histories: Photographs by Barbara Bosworth, about three quarters of the photographs are in black and white and one quarter were in color.

In a San Francisco MoMA interview, Bosworth asserts that her processes are slowed down due to the use of film, and that the care and thoughtfulness put into her work increases with that time. She takes her time carefully studying the landscapes, which primarily consists of forests, birds, and the people her work has crossed paths with. Like other landscape photographers, Bosworth's asserted interest is in exploring the world at her own pace and appreciating what nature puts in front of her. She believes that observation is necessary to the artistic process and end product.

Although she examines what appears before her in the natural world, Bosworth's chosen subject matter remains very personal and depicts specific moments that she has experienced. Her first photographs in and around her home in Ohio were taken from her rectangular living room window, looking out into the Ohio forest. Although her earliest photographs rarely included humans, she increasingly focused on people's connection to and effects on the surrounding environment, and she often mentions her parents and her upbringing as influences. Bosworth's mother developed Parkinson's disease and dementia, while her father died from old age. Bosworth was able to channel these experiences into her work, drawing on them as an inspiration for her book Behold (2014): "Photography is our validation that we were there."

=== Behold ===
Bosworth's work was exhibited in the fall of 2014 at the Datz Museum in SinSeong Gol, Gwangju, Gyeonggi Province, South Korea. This work was collected and bound by the museum's Datz Press, into the book Behold. Bosworth's photographs connected tall, ancient tree stands with people, animals, streams that seem to flow through nature with time. The exhibition had its opening reception on October 11, 2014.

About Behold, Bosworth states:

When my mother was suffering from Parkinson’s disease and a bit of dementia, she would often reach out her hands into the air. As if she was trying to catch something from heaven. A few years ago, when my father was dying, our family gathered around his bedside. When my mother reached for something in the air, I asked her what she was reaching out for and she replied, "Oh, the birds!" I knew then, my bird photographs were for my mother and father. About holding on and letting go. About the moment the bird flies away.

=== New England Trail ===
External videos
- “NET Artist-in-Residence: Barbara Bosworth”, New England National Scenic Trail

In the fall of 2012, the New England National Park Service hired Bosworth as Artist-in-Residence to take pictures along the New England Trail. Her photos were shown at the exhibition To Be at the Farther Edge: Photographs along the New England Trail at Amherst College in Massachusetts and later throughout New England. This work is her tribute to the genre of Hudson River School style paintings, which have inspired her, and her piece View of the Oxbow from Dry Knob (2012) is a particular tribute to Thomas Cole’s famous painting The Oxbow.

=== Trees: national champions ===
Many of Barbara Bosworth’s photographs focus on the landscapes of trees. She explored Holden Arboretum as a child and as an adult with her family. Bosworth says trees "are rooted solidly in the earth but point ethereally toward the sky." "Champion trees" are notably the largest trees of each species according to the National Register of Big Trees, and are found in many different locations including backyards, street sides, mountains, and forests. In Trees: national champions, Bosworth documents the genera of the trees and also shows how their landscape changes from place to place.

=== Voyage of the Charles W. Morgan ===
In the summer of 2014, eighty-five people from various backgrounds were invited to sail on the Charles W. Morgan ship from Mystic Seaport in Mystic, CT, to produce creative projects for Mystic Seaport. Bosworth was chosen because, "While all of her projects remind viewers that we shape nature, but nature also shapes us." The trip was one day and one night long. During that evening, Bosworth created Nocturnal Voyage: The Morgan Series, which consists of five images of the dark sea.

=== The Meadow ===
In 2015, Bosworth collaborated with photographer Margot Anne Kelley to photograph an area of land in Carlisle, Massachusetts, situated among a variety of landscapes with pathways and abandoned areas. The resulting book The Meadow includes a log documenting the daily life of the previous landowner to reinforce the connection between humans and the land, and incorporates photographs in scrap-book form with fold-out booklets and embellishments. The project has been described as "a meditation on the shifting perspective that occurs when one repeatedly sees the same place through new eyes."

=== The Heavens and The Sea ===
The Meadow was followed-up by two other books of large-format images of nature photographed with a 8x10 camera that reprise its exact book format, size, and design: The Heavens (2018) and The Sea (2022). The Heavens is based on a decade worth of large-format long-exposure photographs of the moon, sun and sky. The star photographs are hour-long exposures with the camera mounted on astronomical tracker so to render the stars are as dots rather than streaks. The sun and moon images are made by attaching a telescope to the camera. Like The Meadow, the book includes numerous inserts, including facsimile editions of three artist's books made as a nod to Galileo's publications. The Sea originates from the hours Bosworth'sspent with her father watching the light move across Cape Cod Bay, which have created a life-long habit of walking on the beaches and observing the varying light. The photographs consist mostly of elemental depictions of sky, water and light. They are a meditation on the contradiction that the sea evokes calm and poetic introspection, while remaining an overwhelming force of nature.

== Exhibitions ==
=== Solo exhibitions ===
- Centric 29: Barbara Bosworth, University Art Museum, California State University, Long Beach, CA, 1987
- Meeting Places: Photographs by Barbara Bosworth, Missoula Museum of Art, Missoula, MT, 1996
- Photographs by Barbara Bosworth (ten-year retrospective), The Art Museum, Princeton University, March 14 - June 18, 2000
- Human Nature: the Photographs of Barbara Bosworth, Phoenix Art Museum, April 19, 2008 - July 27, 2008
- Earth and Sky: Photographs by Barbara Bosworth, Smithsonian American Art Museum, Renwick Gallery, June 20, 2008 - November 20, 2008, donated by Haluk Soykan and Elisa Frederickson and supported by Bernie Stadiem Endowment Fund
- Natural Histories, Photographs by Barbara Bosworth (twenty-year retrospective), Peabody Essex Museum, April 14, 2012 - May 27, 2013
- Flow, Datz Museum, October 11, 2014 - February 5, 2015
- Barbara Bosworth: Quiet Wonder, Denver Art Museum, March 13, 2015 - September 20, 2015
- Heaven, Wind, Stars and Poems: Photographs by Barbara Bosworth, Datz Museum, South Korea, 2017
- Barbara Bosworth: Sun Light Moon Shadow, Cleveland Museum of Art, February 25, 2024 - June 30, 2024
- Barbara Bosworth: The Meadow, Museum of Fine Arts, Boston, May 25 - December 1, 2024

=== Group exhibitions ===
- The Altered Landscape, organized by the Reno Museum of Art, traveling exhibition; Bosworth is one of the artists included in the accompanying book.
- Crossing the Frontier, organized by the San Francisco Museum of Modern Art, traveling exhibition
- America's Uncommon Places: Sites from the National Register of Historic Places: Seventeen photographers were selected for an exhibition sponsored by the National Trust for Historic Preservation.
- The Singing and the Silence: Birds in Contemporary Art, October 31, 2014 – February 22, 2015, Smithsonian American Art Museum, Washington, DC: Show included twelve "major contemporary American artists"

== Awards ==
- 1985: Ruttenberg Fellowship, Friends of Photography, San Francisco, CA
- 1986: Artist-in-Residence, Bernheim Forest in Kentucky
- 1992: Artist-in-Residence, Appalachian Environmental Arts Center in North Carolina
- 1993: New England Foundation for the Arts
- 1995: John Simon Guggenheim Memorial Foundation, Fellowship
- 1998/1999: Buhl Foundation, New York, NY, Grant
- 2002: MacDowell Colony, Peterborough, NH, Fellowship
- 2008: Laurel School, Cleveland, OH, Scholar-in-Residence
- 2008: Marsh Billings Rockefeller National Historical Park, Woodstock, VT, Fellowship
- 2010: Sudbury, Assabet, and Concord Wild and Scenic River Stewardship Council, Wild and Scenic River Grant
- 2012: Kittredge Fund, Grant
- 2012: Artist-in-Residence, New England National Scenic Trail, National Park Service
- 2013: Honored Educator Award, Society for Photographic Education
- 2015: Pollock-Krasner Foundation, Grant
- 2016: Shortlisted for Paris Photo-Aperture Foundation, Photo Book of the Year
- 2024: The Cleveland Art Prize, Life Time Achievement

== Publications ==
- Bodman, D'Anne; Bosworth, Barbara (2002). Chasing the Light. Carlisle, Mass.: Nightwood.
- Bosworth, Barbara; Nickel, Douglas R.; Stilgoe, John R. (2005). Trees: National Champions. Tucson, Ariz.: Center for Creative Photography, University of Arizona. ISBN 978-0262025928.
- Bosworth, Barbara; Bodman, D'Anne; Kristesen, John; Petrie, Marie-Louise Bodman (2010). Elsewhere. Boston, Mass.: Firefly.
- Bosworth, Barbara (2013). Natural Histories. Santa Fe, NM: Radius. ISBN 9781934435601.
- Bosworth, Barbara (2014). Behold. Seoul, Korea: Datz. ISBN 978-8997605095.
- Bosworth, Barbara (2015). Summer Days: And Some Nights, the Water's Edge. Fiddlehead. ISBN 9780991159505.
- Bosworth, Barbara (2015). Betula Populifolia. Boston, Mass.: Firefly.
- Bosworth, Barbara; Kelley, Margot Anne (2015). The Meadow. Santa Fe, NM: Radius. ISBN 9781934435960.
- Bosworth, Barbara; Kelley, Margot Anne; Lukitsh, Joanne; Gingerich, Owen (2018). The Heavens. Santa Fe, NM: Radius.
- Bosworth, Barbara; Kelley, Margot Anne (2022). The Sea. Santa Fe, NM: Radius. ISBN 9781942185918.

== Collections ==
Bosworth's work is held in the following permanent collection:

- Museum of Modern Art, New York: 1 print (as of 1 April 2022)
