= Bowling Green State University =

Public research university in Bowling Green, Ohio, US

- Former names: Bowling Green State Normal School (1914–1929); Bowling Green State College (1929–1935)
- Type: Public research university
- Established: September 27, 1910; 115 years ago
- Parent institution: University System of Ohio
- Endowment: $259.4 million (2025)
- President: Rodney K. Rogers
- Provost: Glenn Davis
- Faculty: 1,982 (1,109 faculty, 873 graduate assistants)
- Administrative staff: 1,916
- Students: 20,395 (Bowling Green); 22,986 (all campuses)
- Undergraduates: 19,183 (on campus); 2,500 (Firelands)
- Postgraduates: 3,803 (all campuses)
- Location: Bowling Green, Ohio, United States; 41.38°N 83.63°W
- Campus: 1,338 acres (5.41 km^{2}); College town
- Colors: Orange and brown
- Nickname: Falcons
- Sporting affiliations: NCAA Division I – MAC
- Mascot: Freddie and Frieda Falcon
- Website: bgsu.edu

Bowling Green State University (BGSU) is a public research university in Bowling Green, Ohio, United States. The 1,338-acre (541.5 ha) main academic and residential campus is 15 miles (24 km) south of Toledo, Ohio. The institution was granted a charter in 1910 as a normal school, specializing in teacher training and education. The university has developed from a small rural normal school into a comprehensive public research university. It is a part of the University System of Ohio and is currently classified as R2: Doctoral Universities with high research activity.

In 2019, Bowling Green offered over 200 undergraduate programs, as well as master's and doctoral degrees through eight academic colleges. BGSU had an on-campus residential student population of approximately 6,000 students and a total enrollment of over 19,000 students as of 2018. The university also maintains a satellite campus, known as BGSU Firelands, in Huron, Ohio, 60 miles (97 km) east of the main campus. Although the majority of students attend classes on BGSU's main campus, about 2,000 students attend classes at Firelands and about 600 additional students attend online. About 85% of Bowling Green's students are from Ohio.

The university hosts an extensive student life program, with over 300 student organizations. Fielding athletic teams known as Bowling Green Falcons, the university competes at the NCAA Division I level as a member of the Mid-American Conference in all sports except ice hockey, in which the university is a member of the Central Collegiate Hockey Association.

== History ==
=== 1800s–1920: Early history ===
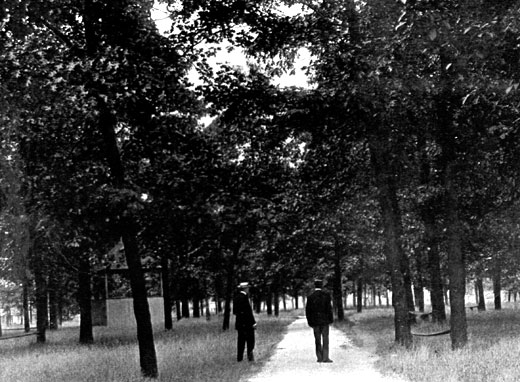
First known photograph of the campus, taken in 1910 before buildings were erected.

==== Background ====
The movement for a public high learning institution in northwestern Ohio began in the late 1800s as part of the growth in public institutions during the Progressive Era to meet demands for training and professional development of teachers. During the period, people of northwestern Ohio campaigned for a school in their region to produce better quality education and educators. The movement argued that the existing universities, Ohio State University in Columbus, Miami University in Oxford and Ohio University in Athens, were distant and the region lacked a state-supported school of its own.

==== Lowry Bill ====
In 1910, the Ohio General Assembly passed the Lowry Normal School Bill that authorized Governor Judson Harmon to appoint the Commission on Normal School Sites to survey forty communities for two sites for normal schools, one in northeastern Ohio and one in northwestern Ohio. The commission examined population within a 25-mile (40.2 km) radius of each community, along with railroad and transportation infrastructure, the moral atmosphere, health and sanitary conditions and site suitability.

Bowling Green offered four possible sites and became one of four finalists including Fremont, Napoleon, and Van Wert. Despite the town being the home of John Lowry, Napoleon was ruled out because the commission found it had numerous saloons. Fremont was eliminated mainly due to the specific stipulations imposed by the President Rutherford B. Hayes Memorial Commission. Bowling Green was chosen on November 10, 1910, over Van Wert in a 3–2 vote by the commission. The site located on 82.5 acres (0.334 km^{2}) of primarily rural land and a small town park, nearby railroad and transportation infrastructure, its central location in the region, and Bowling Green's dry status were major factors that the town was chosen by the commission. At the same time, the commission chose Kent for a school in Northeastern Ohio. Over the years 1911 and 1912, the board of trustees was appointed by the Governor and elected a school president on February 16, 1912. A campus plan was created and $150,000 was appropriated to develop the campus and construct the first buildings.

==== Founding ====
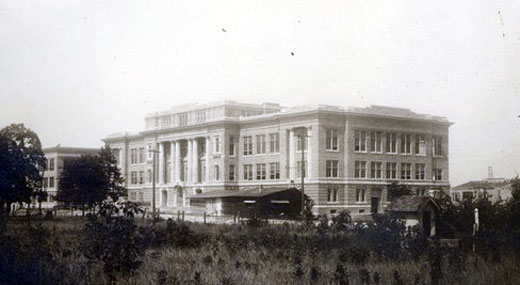
Bowling Green Normal School in 1915

The school opened on September 15, 1914, as Bowling Green State Normal School in two temporary locations at the Bowling Green Armory and at a branch school in Toledo for the 1914–1915 academic year. The first honorary organization of the college, the Book and Motor was conceived around this time. It initially enrolled 304 students from Ohio, Michigan, and New York who were taught by 21 faculty members. The school graduated its first class in 1915, consisting of 35 certified teachers. University Hall and Williams Hall opened that year, the school's first two permanent buildings. Two years later the first baccalaureate degrees for teacher education were awarded. The university began to invite notable guests to campus during the 1917–1918 semester, including the Zoellner Quartet, and the Ben Greet Shakespearean Players.

On March 28, 1920, a tornado, part of the 1920 Palm Sunday tornado outbreak, damaged three of the school's buildings. The tornado touched down near Bowling Green and strengthened as it moved into Ottawa County where it killed two people in Genoa.

=== 1920–1940 ===
==== Early expansion ====
Over the next decade the school expanded academic facilities, athletics and student life, as enrollment grew to over 900 students. On October 28, 1927, Ivan "Doc" Lake, a BGSU graduate and sports editor of the Daily Sentinel-Tribune, established the nickname "Falcons". Lake thought the nickname fit with the school's colors. Prior to "Falcons," sports writers used various other names, including: "B.G. Normals", "Teachers", and the "B.G. Pedagogues". The school achieved the status of college in 1929 when the Emmons-Hanna Bill renamed it to Bowling Green State College (BGSC). At the same time, the college expanded its curriculum through the addition of the College of Liberal Arts, now known as the College of Arts and Sciences.

==== Great Depression ====
Aerial view of the campus, circa early 1930s

Enrollment levels held steady into the Great Depression, with enrollment surpassing 1,000 for the first time in 1931. However, in 1933, the Ohio State Senate Welfare Commission proposed a plan to convert the school into a mental health institution. Students, faculty and administrators organized with the Bowling Green community to counter the proposal. The Student Protest Committee coordinated with the faculty and administration to organize a campus rally and march through the downtown Bowling Green. Members of the Protest Committee then launched a letter-writing campaign to community leaders throughout northwest Ohio, which helped convince the state legislature that closing the school would be counterproductive. The measure was defeated by a 14–5 vote. A few years later, in May 1935, the college was granted university status and changed its name to Bowling Green State University. The university added the College of Business Administration to the existing College of Education and College of Liberal Arts. Within a year BGSU added master's degree programs in Education, English, History, Social Science and Mathematics. In 1938 the university adopted an official tenure policy. In 1939 the university began training pilots, led by instructor Mike Murphy at the Findlay Airport. In 1939, the university established The Committee for Gifts, Endowments, and Memorials, its first private endowment fund.

=== 1940–1960 ===
==== World War II ====
Navy and Marines performing drills on the BGSU campus during World War II in 1945.

The 1940s, including World War II and its aftermath, brought big changes to BGSU. The war caused a drastic decrease in male enrollment and by 1943, the university canceled dances and formals, citing the lack of male students.

The university continued expanding facilities including its first student union, The Falcon's Nest, and new cottage-style dorms for social groups and learning-living communities, and dedication of the Wood County airport. Bowling Green was one of 240 colleges and universities to take part in the V-5 and V-12 Navy College Training Programs to supplement the lower enrollment during the war. The programs offered students a path to a Navy commission, enrolling cadets in regular college courses as well as naval training. Faculty were added to accommodate the military training programs.

Student life adapted to the wartime era with efforts such as the War Relief Committee, blood drives and War Bonds initiatives. In December 1942 Sherwood Eddy spoke on campus on topics relating to the Asiatic-Pacific Theater. In July 1944 the university was selected by officials at Camp Perry as a potential camp for temporary prisoners of war.

==== Post-war era expansion ====
In the post-war era, BGSU constructed temporary structures to keep up with the increased housing demands for veterans and their families. BGSU added 40 trailers to house male and married students in 1945, known as "Falcon Heights". In 1946, the university added 15 steel buildings to house male students in an area near the football stadium that became known as "Tin Pan Alley". By the late 1940s, the student house shortage became so severe that the nearby National Guard Armory and ODOT garage were converted to house male students.

The Federal Housing Authority provided two wooden barracks, ten trailers, and more steel buildings. The BGSU Army ROTC was established on campus in 1948 as enrollment increased dramatically in the post war era. The university continued to add academic programs as the enrollment increased during the mid to late 1940s, including the Graduate School in 1948 after Dr. Emerson Shuck led the effort to create school. In 1948 the university hosted the world premiere of the last play by Lennox Robinson, The Lucky Finger. By 1950, enrollment grew to new record highs, with over 5,000 students.

1951 saw major changes when Ralph W. McDonald was appointed the fourth president in school history, following the retirement of Frank Prout. McDonald was the first university president from outside Ohio and came to BGSU with a focus on improving teacher education and certification standards. Prior to becoming president, he served as the Executive Secretary of the Department of Higher Education of the National Education Association for seven years. Under McDonald, BGSU reorganized its three colleges to group common departments together within each college. Reflecting the Cold War era, BGSU added an Air Force ROTC program and a Department of Air Science and Tactics. BGSU continued to add programs and in the early 1950s added a Master of Education (M.Ed.) and a Master of Science (M.S.) in Education. The university constructed new residence halls during the decade, Prout Hall in 1955 and Founders Quadrangle in 1957. The new student center opened in 1958.

=== 1960–1990 ===
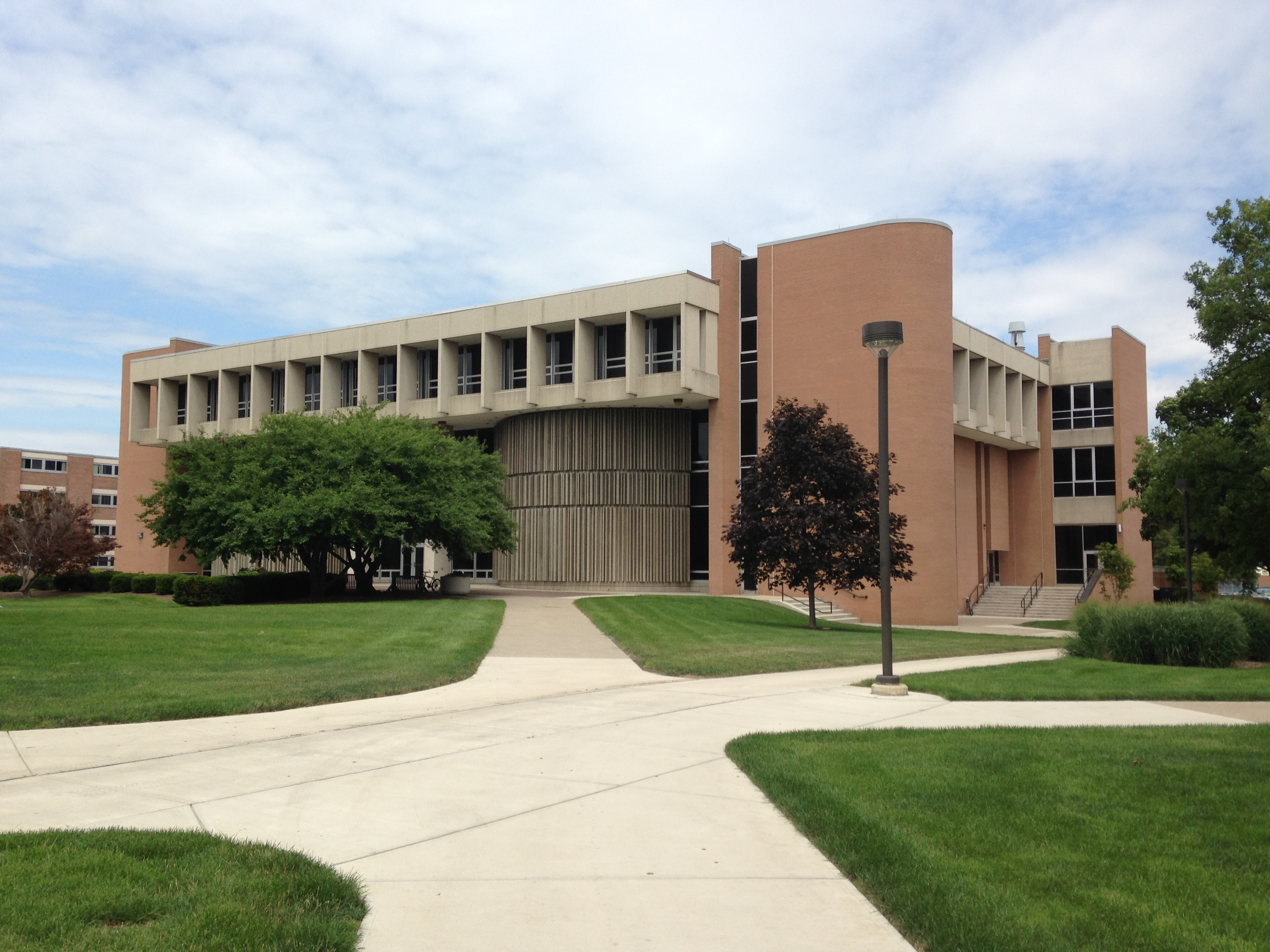
The Mathematical Sciences Building was completed in 1970 at a final cost of $7.2 million.

The College of Education experienced rapid growth and expansion during the 1960s when the university added various specialized education programs, including majors in special education, school psychology, guidance and counseling and vocational rehabilitation counseling. It expanded arts and music programs when the music department became the College of Education's first "school", renamed the School of Music in 1961. Specializations in guidance and counseling were added to the Master of Arts and Master of Education degrees in 1964; as well as a new department for teaching college administration. By 1965, BGSU's College of Education enrolled 5,470 students and was ranked the 16th largest producer of teachers in the United States. The university added new academic, administrative, and athletic facilities during the 1960s. Memorial Hall, later known as Anderson Arena, opened in 1960.

The new Administration Building opened in 1964 and the William T. Jerome Library opened in 1967. Student activism became common in the 1960s, reflecting the various social and political events of the time period. Vietnam War protests were common in downtown Bowling Green and on campus.

In 1969, a Black Student Union formed to encourage unity, scholarship, leadership, culture and political awareness of African Americans students. The majority of student activism at BGSU was peaceful and Bowling Green was the only public college or university in Ohio to reopen in the spring of 1970, following the Kent State shootings during anti-war protests. Bowling Green added two colleges in the early 1970s when the College of Health and Human Services opened in 1973 and the School of Music was elevated to the College of Musical Arts in 1975.

In addition to the new colleges, the BGSU Popular Culture Center opened in 1970 as one of the first pop culture centers in the United States. In 1978, the university established the University Honors Program.

Throughout the 1970s construction continued, starting with the Mathematical Sciences Building, followed by the Offenhauer Towers in 1971 and Industrial Education & Technology Building in 1972. The Business Building and the Industrial Arts Building opened in 1973 and University Hall received renovations in 1974 that included new seating, an improved sound system, and air conditioning in the auditorium. In 1979, the Student Recreation Center and the Moore Musical Arts Center opened. In 1970, the Board of Trustees ended an alcoholic beverage ban on campus. The Cardinal Room, an on-campus eatery, began serving beer. A growing trend in the late 1960s and early 1970s was the development of large apartment complexes adjacent to campus.

By the 1970s approximately 4,000 students lived in private, off-campus housing. On campus, Darrow Hall became the first co-ed residence hall in 1972 with men and women inhabiting alternating floors.

In 1981, the university hosted Xing-Fang Olu, a geneticist from Fudan University to study cytogenetics, and sent its own Jong Sik Yoon to teach at Fudan in return. This was the first such exchange in Ohio since the founding of the People's Republic of China. In 1984, ties were strengthened with Fudan University, along with then Xi'an Foreign Language Institute, following a visit to China by then-University President Paul Olscamp, and establishment of more regular exchange programs.

The School of Technology was given college status in 1985 and renamed the College of Technology. The university expanded many of the technology and science facilities during the 1980s, including constructing the Planetarium and Physical Sciences Building. In 1985, Ronald Reagan became the seventh president or president-elect to visit the university after Warren G. Harding, Theodore Roosevelt, William Howard Taft, John F. Kennedy, Richard Nixon, and Gerald Ford.

=== 1990–2019 ===
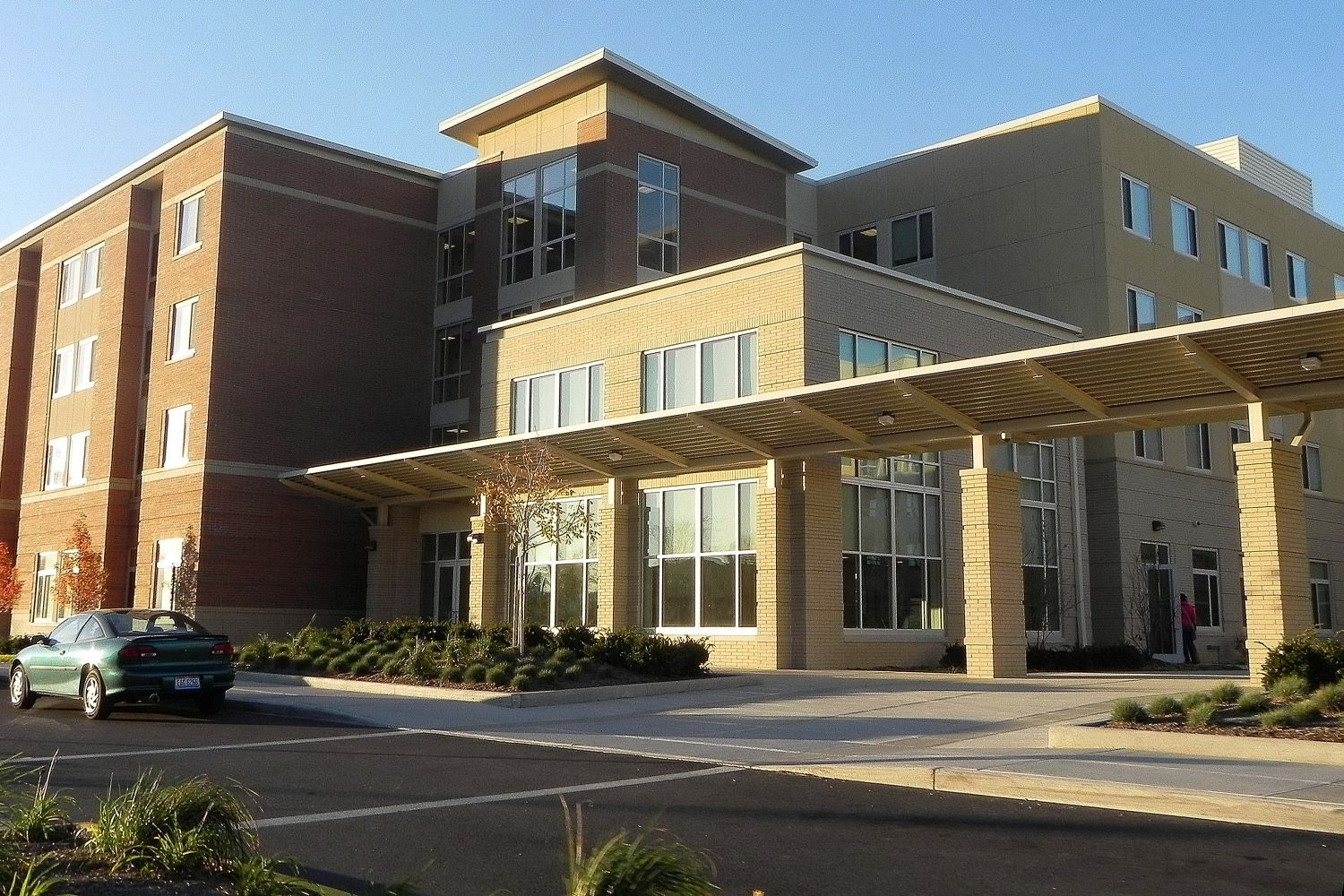
One of the newest residence halls at BGSU, Falcon Heights opened in Fall 2011.

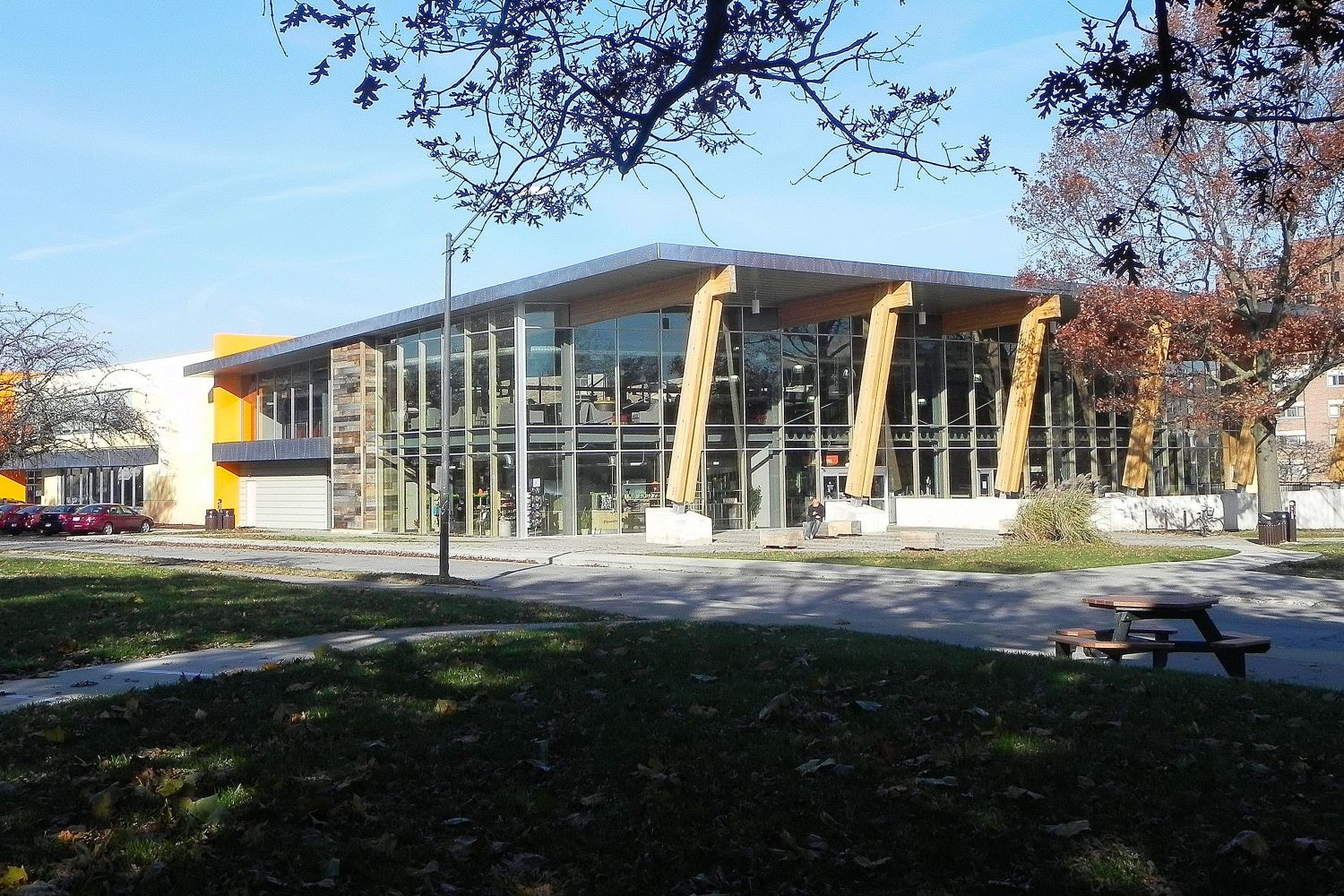
The Oaks Dining Hall

During the 1990s, the university renovated and constructed many buildings. The Stroh Center, a 5,000-seat arena to replace the aging Anderson Arena, opened in 2011, hosting basketball and volleyball in addition to graduation ceremonies, concerts, and other events.

In 2009, the university began construction on the Wolfe Center for the Arts. The 93,000-square-foot (8,600 m^{2}) facility opened in 2011 with performance space, as well as work and classroom areas for art studies of the School of Art, the Department of Theatre and Film, and the College of Musical Arts. That same year, BGSU built a $40 million residence hall project that included two new residence halls, one a traditional-style dorm and a second suite-style for upperclassmen. The residence hall project added more than 800 beds. In the fall of 2011, BGSU opened The Oaks dining hall.

The Oaks was constructed with sustainable designs that included a hybrid solar and wind power system to fulfill Leadership in Energy and Environmental Design (LEED), an electric-powered truck to distribute food on campus, and a rooftop garden. The building used sustainable and recycled construction materials.

In Fall of 2016 the university began offering a degree in Mechatronics engineering. In 2016 and 2017, three major renovations were complete to three original campus building, totaling about $70 million. The former South Hall was re-opened in fall 2016 after undergoing a $24 million renovation and renaming to The Michael and Sarah Kuhlin Center. The building is home to BGSU's School of Media and Communications. Following a $25 million renovation and restoration, University Hall re-opened in Fall 2017. It was originally built in 1915 as one of the first buildings on campus. Today, University Hall houses the Office of Admissions, classrooms and active learning spaces. Also, in Fall 2017, Moseley Hall reopened, following a $21 million restoration and renovation. Moseley Hall, built in 1916, originally housed the university's agricultural science program. Today, it features technologically advanced laboratories for chemistry, biology, geology, and medical lab science.

=== 2020–present ===
In June 2020, the College of Health and Human Services created two schools, a School of Nursing and a School of Physical Therapy. In July 2020, the College of Business became the first named college on campus when it was renamed to the Allan and Carol Schmidthorst College of Business following a $15 million donation. The renaming coincided with the moving to the College of Business from the Business Administration Building to the new Maurer Center, a $44.2 million structure built onto the former Hanna Hall.

== Campuses ==
=== Bowling Green ===
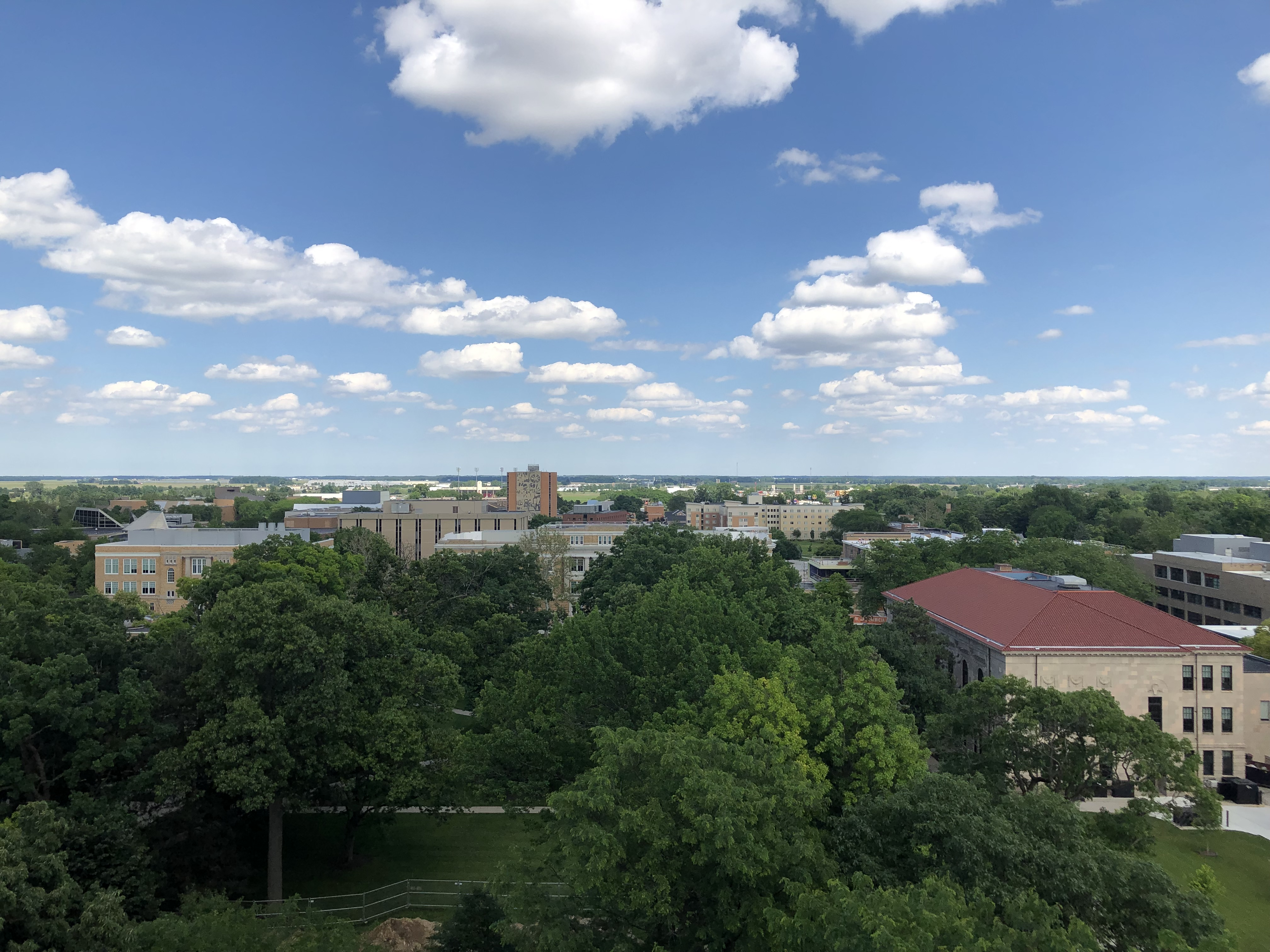
The main campus skyline looking east from the Administration Building

The main academic and residential campus is located on the northeast side of Bowling Green. The campus is arranged in a rectangle roughly 1.5 miles (2.4 km) long and 1 mile (1.6 km) wide. It includes over 116 buildings on 1,338 acres (5.41 km^{2}).

==== Old Campus ====
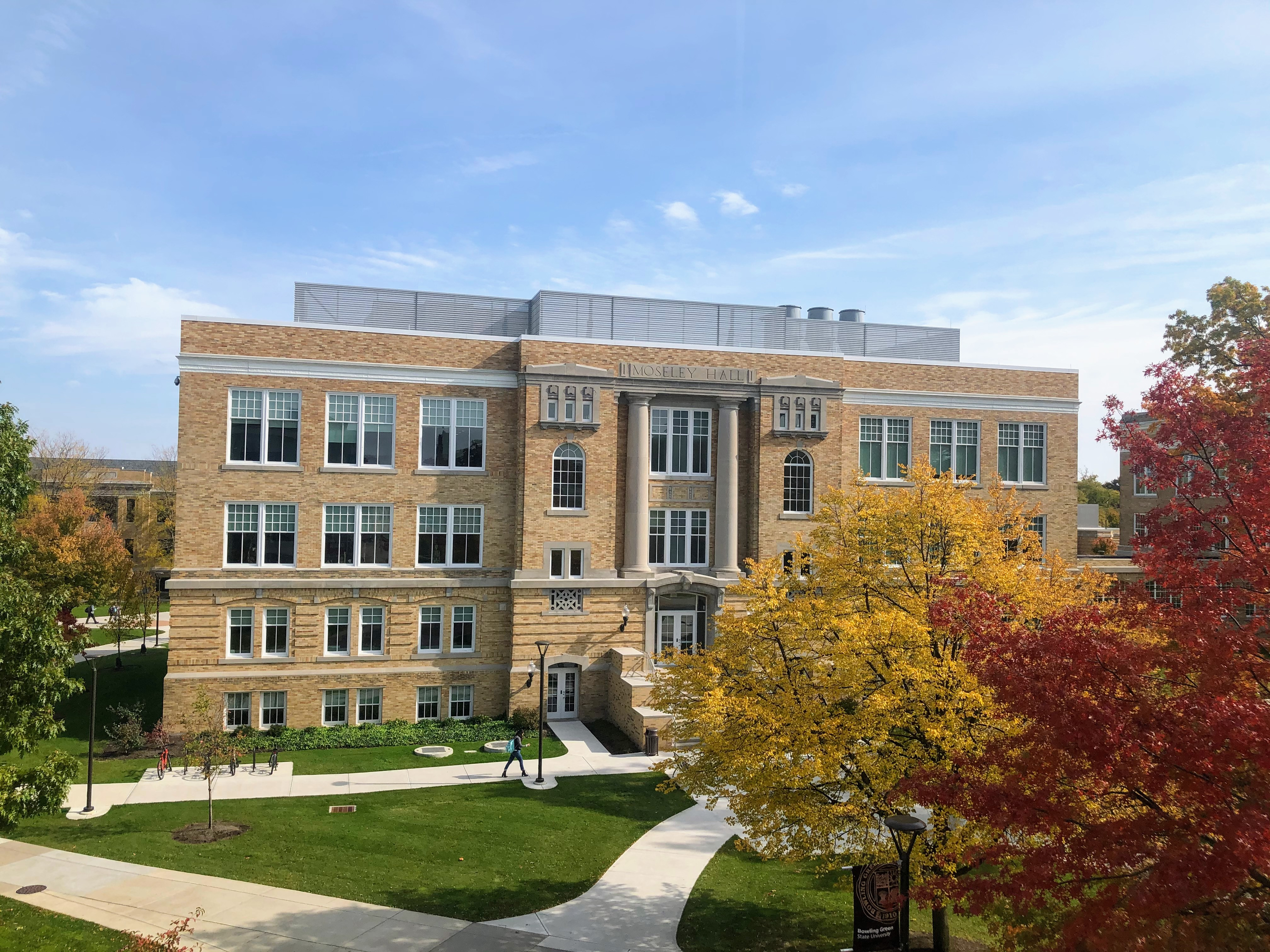
Moseley Hall, built in 1916

The oldest portion of the BGSU campus is located in the southwest corner and hosts the original campus buildings. This area offers green space with large trees and historic buildings built in the early 1900s. Administrative services and classrooms occupy these buildings. Although not part of the historic section, Founders Hall, a large dorm, is located on the Southwest corner. Hanna Hall housed "The Dorothy and Lillian Gish Film Theater and Gallery" prior to its renovation as the Maurer Center. Dedicated to BGSU in 1976, it features early film memorabilia and highlights the careers of both Lillian Gish and Dorothy Gish. The theater was renovated and rededicated in 1990. It seated 168 and was home to Tuesdays at the Gish, an International Film Series, and a Sunday Matinee Series, which were free and open to the community. On May 3, 2019, the trustees voted to remove the Gish name from the theater following calls to do so from the Black Student Union and a subsequent task force report, which found that naming the theater after Lillian Gish created a "non-inclusive learning environment" due to her involvement with The Birth of a Nation.

Mike Kaplan, co-producer of The Whales of August (1987), Lillian Gish's final film, circulated a petition urging Bowling Green State University to restore the names of the Gish sisters to the film theater. The protest was signed by over 50 film industry figures, including actors Dame Helen Mirren, James Earl Jones, Malcolm McDowell, and Lauren Hutton, and directors George Stevens Jr., Peter Bogdanovich, Bertrand Tavernier, Joe Dante, and Martin Scorsese.

==== Science Research Complex ====
The Science Research Complex is located on the northwest side of campus. The buildings of the science research complex were built in the mid-60s. They include Mathematical Science, Life Science, Psychology, Physical Science, and Technology (engineering). The Geology, Chemistry and Earth Science departments are located in Overman Hall.

==== Student life facilities ====
Three large residence halls occupy the western edge of campus. Offenhauer Towers consist of a ten-story and an eleven-story tower, connected by a first-floor lobby. Offenhauer shelters a small convenience store. McDonald Hall houses over 1,200 students. The western edge hosts The Oaks, an eco-friendly dining facility. Falcon Heights, a new residence hall, was added in 2011 across from Offenhauer Towers.

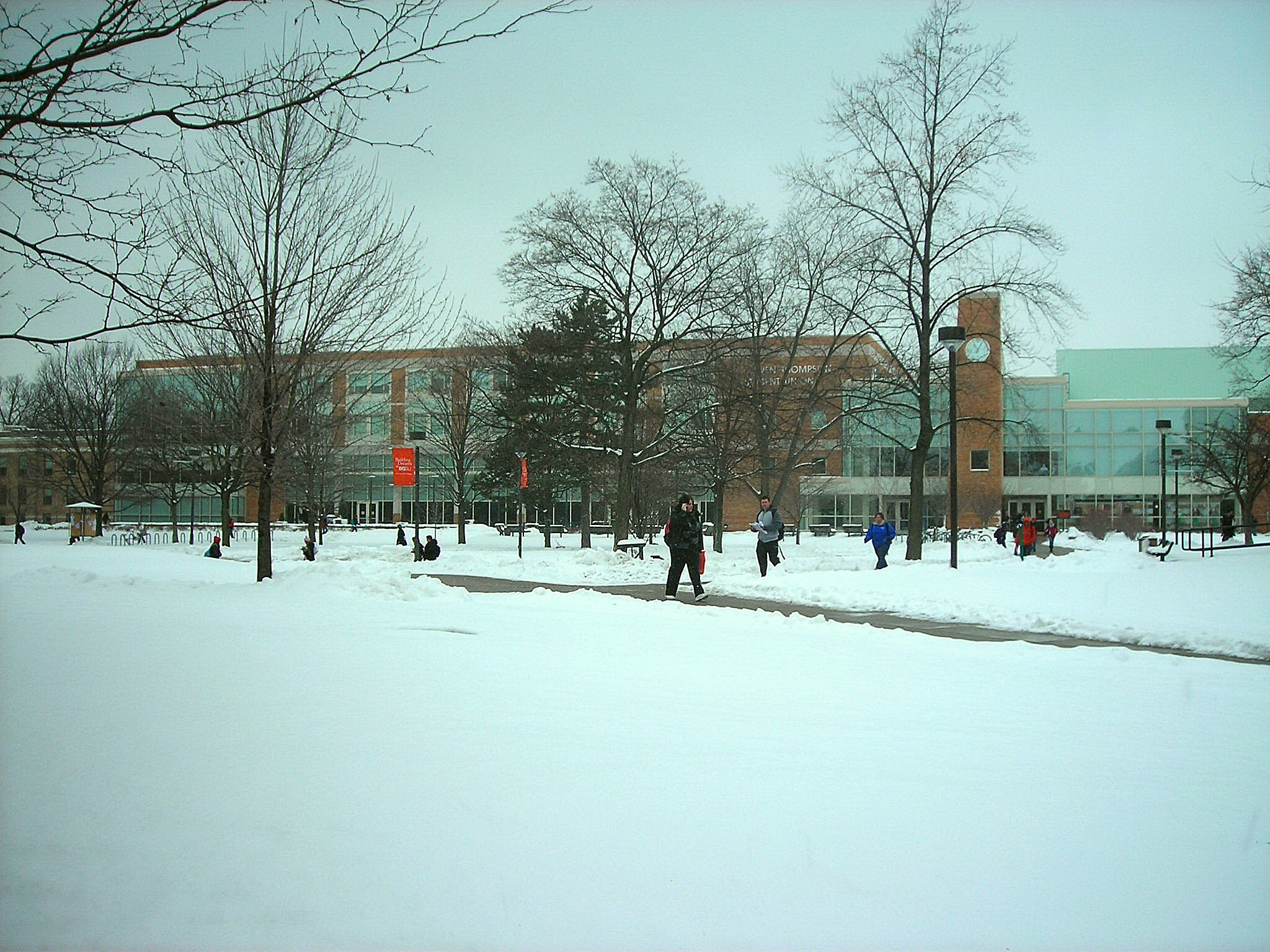
Fresh snow covers the lawn near the Student Union.

The Bowen-Thompson Student Union opened in 2002 in the west-central part of campus. It houses eateries including The Falcon's Nest food court, Starbucks and Pub 1910 (previously known as The Black Swamp Pub). Other facilities include Falcon Outfitters, convenience store, computer labs, meeting rooms, a 250-seat movie theater, ballrooms, and various student lounges.

Central Campus features large lecture halls and classroom buildings. One of the most prominent is the 95,000 sq ft (9,000 m^{2}) Olscamp Hall, which contains 28 classrooms and lecture halls capable of seating a total of 2,000 students. Others include Schmidthorst Business Building, the Education Building, MacLeod Hall (formerly the Math/Science Building), and the Eppler Complex, home to the Sport Management department. Anderson Arena is a 5,000-seat arena, current home for BGSU women's gymnastics and former home of BGSU men's and women's basketball and volleyball. Memorial Hall is connected to Anderson and houses the college's ROTC programs. Jerome Library is the main library on campus and the second tallest building at nine stories. Conklin North is another residence hall in the central portion of campus. Oak Grove Cemetery is located in the north-central portion of campus. Bowling Green State University opened the Falcon health center in 2013 after demolishing the Popular Culture building in 2012. The Falcon Health Center is located across Wooster Street from the Education Building. The Health and Human Services building is located near the Library.

The BGSU campus police station as well as counseling services are located in the College Park Office Building on the southern edge. Kohl Hall is a dormitory exclusive to members of the Chapman Learning Community, Partners in Context and Community for Urban Educators. A new predominantly freshman dormitory known as Centennial Hall was established in 2011 and is adjacent to the Carillon Place Dining facility. The southern edge hosts on-campus fraternity and sorority houses.

Nearby is the Kreischer Quadrangle and the Alumni Mall. Kreischer Quadrangle contains four connected halls that operate as separate units. Kreischer features a late night dining hall as well as a convenience store. Kreischer-Compton is home to the Arts Village Learning Community for students with interests in dance, art, creative writing, theater, or music. This community offers members-only classes.

==== Arts facilities ====
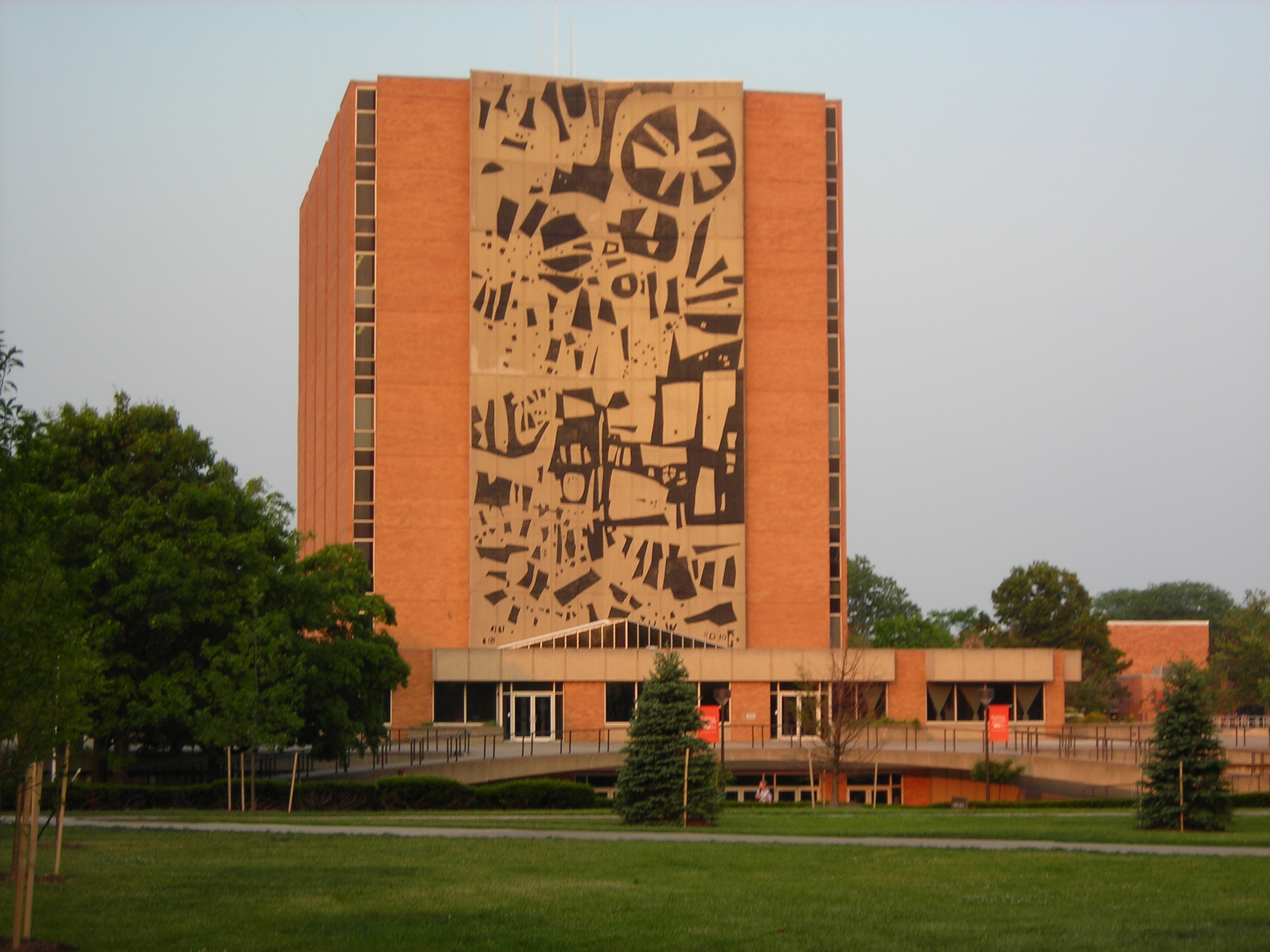
Jerome Library on BGSU's main campus

Arts programs are located to the east of Anderson Arena and Jerome Library in the east-central area. The Fine Arts Center is home to the School of Art and houses classrooms, a studio, workshop spaces, art galleries, a glassblowing studio and faculty offices. BGSU is one of only a few schools that offer degrees in glassblowing. The Moore Musical Arts Center is located along Ridge St and is the home to the College of Musical Arts. Moore includes classrooms, recording studios, rehearsal halls, and Kobacker Hall, a large theater where many performances on campus are held. Moore also includes MidAmerican Center for Contemporary Music, a national center with a focus on the study, performance, creative work and promotion of contemporary music. The Wolfe Center for the Arts opened in December 2011. It is the new centerpiece for the Arts, located between Fine Arts and Moore. The 93,000 sq ft (9,000 m^{2}) building houses the School of Art, the Department of Theatre and Film, and the School of Musical Arts. It includes classrooms, rehearsal space, performance/theater space, as well as design and office space, the 400-seat Thomas and Kathleen Donnell Theatre, and a black-box stage, editing and digital laboratories, classrooms, studios, faculty space, and choral rehearsal rooms.

==== Athletic and recreational facilities ====
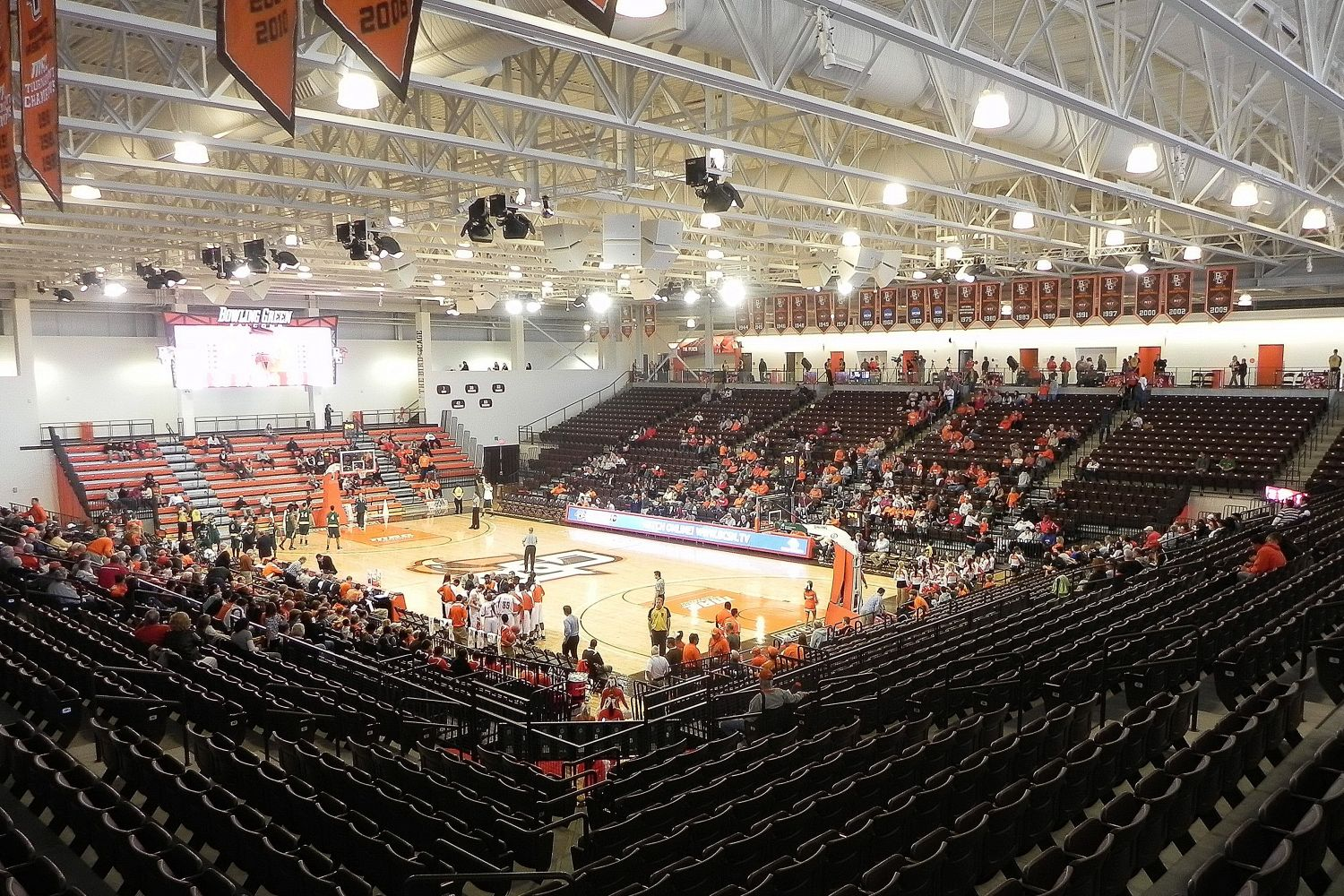
Interior of the Stroh Center prior to an exhibition game against Tiffin.

Most athletic and recreational facilities are located on the eastern half of campus. The Student Recreation Center is a 185,000 sq ft (17,000 m^{2}) facility that includes two swimming pools, four weight rooms, a cardio room, an elevated running track, an Activity Center for aerobics and a large sports center which accommodates basketball, tennis, volleyball, and badminton and other sports. North of the center lies Perry Field House, a 127,000 sq ft (12,000 m^{2}) athletic facility with a 100 x 60 indoor synthetic turf, four batting cages, and a 200-meter track encircling four courts for basketball, volleyball, or tennis. The Slater Family Ice Arena is a 5,000-seat ice hockey arena that is used by various teams and clubs as well as public use. The rink is also home to the Black Swamp Ice Frogs, a special needs hockey team. The arena also includes a smaller ice sheet for curling, figure skating, youth ice hockey, and public skating. The Eppler complex is the oldest building on campus for athletics and is the main practice area for cheerleading, gymnastics, dancing and fencing. At one time it housed the original natatorium. Doyt Perry Stadium is a 28,600 seat football stadium located on the eastern edge. The Stroh Center is an on-campus venue for athletics, concerts, commencement, lectures, and numerous campus and community events. The facility serves as the home for the Falcons men's and women's basketball and volleyball programs. Notably, the structure is one of the most environmentally friendly buildings on campus, designed to achieve challenging Leadership in Energy and Environmental Design (LEED) certification.

==== Transportation and safety ====
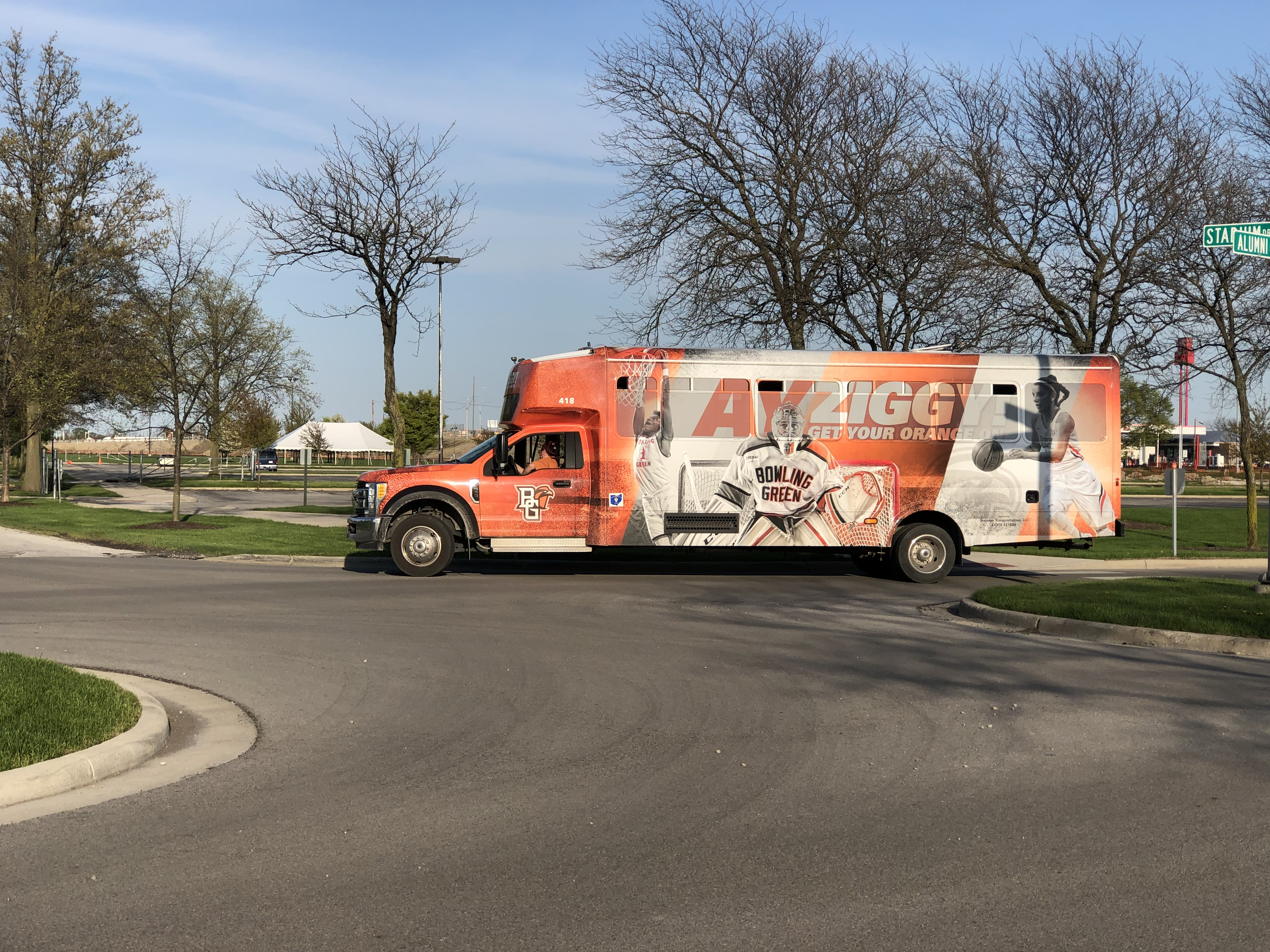
BGSU shuttle near the Visitor Center stop

The campus fare-free bus transit system began in 1990 and runs throughout the campus and surrounding neighborhoods. In 2005 the university started testing Hybrid buses on the service's main route. The first hybrid bus on the system used a proprietary diesel-electric propulsion system, known as a Hybrid Booster Drive (HBD), and was developed by the Electric Vehicle Institute (EVI) within the BGSU College of Technology. The system is made up of four routes. It includes major stops at various residence halls, academic buildings and athletic buildings. The campus has a mobile application that allows the students to track the location of the different buses around campus. This application also gives an estimated time of arrival for each route to reach a given bus stop.

The Orange Bike program began in 2008 as part of an increase in campus sustainability. The program offers a community bike rental service to students to reduce the carbon footprint of commuters.

The University Police Department provides 24-hour law enforcement and security, campus escort service, motorist assistance, educational programs, and crime prevention information for the BGSU campus and surrounding areas.

=== BGSU Firelands ===
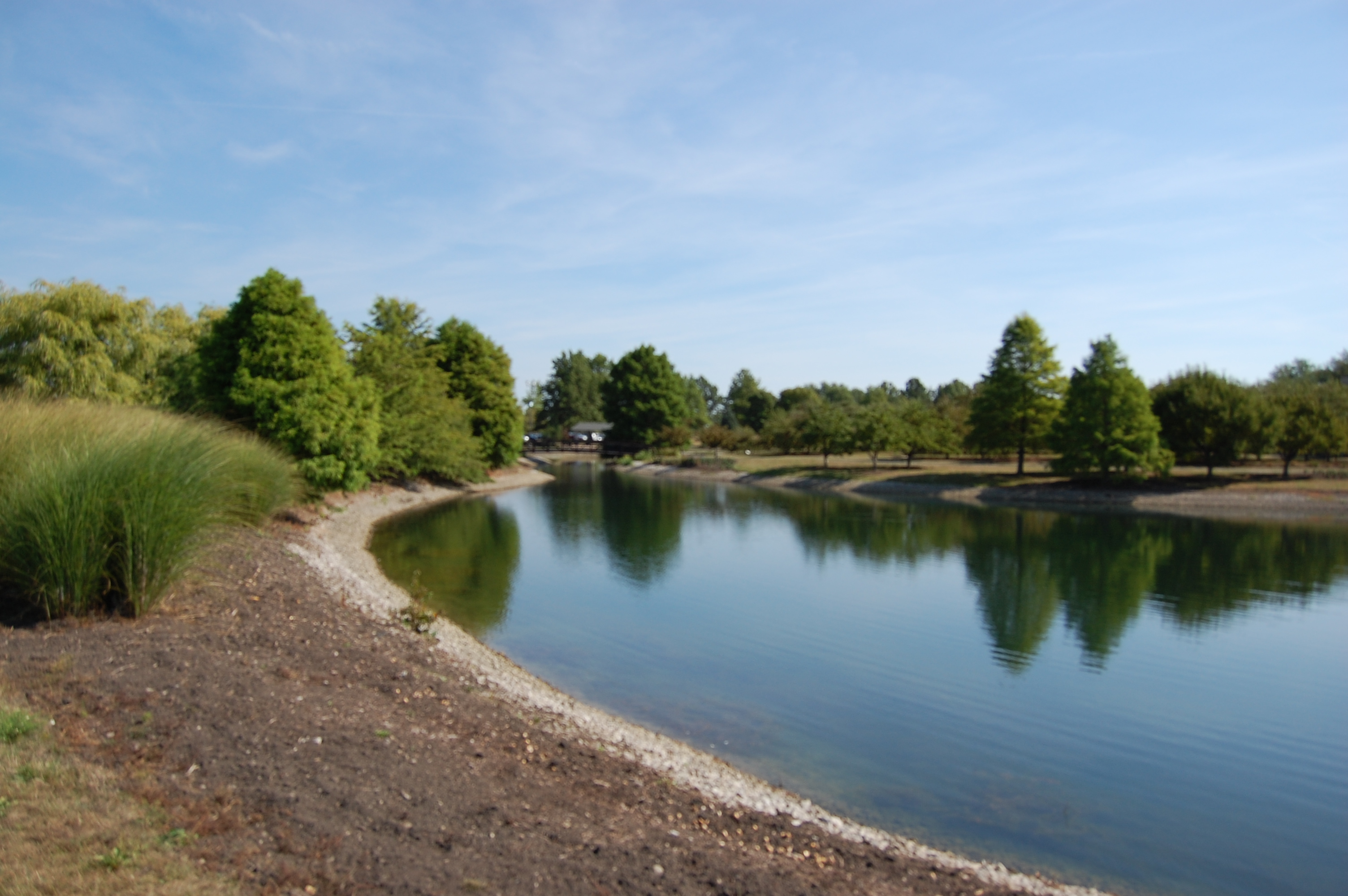
The Firelands James H. McBride Arboretum

The college is located in Huron, Ohio, about 60 miles (97 km) east of Bowling Green. BGSU Firelands is a non-residential, commuter school that offers associate degrees and prepares students for transfer to bachelor's programs or for entry into the job market in technical or paraprofessional areas. The college also offers some on-site bachelor's degree programs and general education classes that students can apply for majors at the main campus classes or transfer to another four-year institution.

First offered in 1946 in the Sandusky area and later expanded to serve Erie, Huron, Lorain, and Ottawa counties, extension programs established a foundation for BGSU Firelands, the university's regional campus. The college was established at a site located near Lake Erie in Huron, Ohio, when the first building (now Foundation Hall) was opened. In 2003, Cedar Point Center opened its doors on the Firelands campus. The facility houses a 450-seat divisible public meeting area, smaller conference rooms, a cyber cafe, multimedia classrooms, and two distance learning classrooms.

== Academics and rankings ==
Bowling Green State University offers more than 200 undergraduate majors and confers degrees. BGSU has full accreditation from the Higher Learning Commission (HLC). Bowling Green has been fully accredited by the North Central Association of the Higher Learning Commission since 1916 and received its ten-year renewal in 2002–2003. In addition, BGSU has accreditation from the HLC to offer full degree programs online. The university offers bachelor's degrees, master's degrees, and doctoral degrees through its eight colleges:

- College of Arts and Sciences
- Allen W. and Carol M. Schmidthorst College of Business
- College of Education and Human Development
- Firelands College

- Graduate College
- College of Health and Human Services
- College of Musical Arts
- College of Technology, Architecture and Applied Engineering

Academic rankings

National
- Forbes: 481
- U.S. News & World Report: 293 (tie)
- Washington Monthly: 279

Global
- U.S. News & World Report: 1521 (tie)

BGSU was ranked 119th on the Top Public Schools ranking by U.S. News & World Report. The university remains a leader in teacher preparation and was ranked 127th among America's Best Education Schools by U.S. News & World Report. Students enrolled in the College of Education and Human Development may choose majors from among several teacher licensure areas, including early childhood (grades Pre-K to 3), Middle Childhood (grades 4–9), Adolescent-Young Adult (grades 7–12), Special Education (grades K–12), and foreign language (grades K–12). In addition, BGSU continues to have one of the top four programs in the United States for Industrial & Organizational Psychology per U.S. News & World Report. The university is also ranked the most affordable college in Ohio by Business Insider.

BGSU offered the nation's first Ph.D. program in photochemical science. BGSU's graduate program in chemistry is ranked 150 in U.S. News & World Report's Best Grad School Rankings. BGSU also offered the first Ph.D. program in applied philosophy. Due in part to a grant from the National Institute of Standards and Technology, BGSU is building a digital forensics lab to complement its digital forensics and cybersecurity courses. The college of Business opened a facility at Levis Commons in Perrysburg, Ohio, for its Professional MBA program. BGSU opened a satellite campus offering MBA classes at Owens Community College in Findlay, Ohio, in January 2013. BGSU is one of only two universities with an airport on its campus.

=== Tuition and graduation rates ===
Spring 2019 undergraduate tuition for the main campus costs are $379.00 per credit hour for in-state tuition while out-of-state tuition is $711.85 per credit hour. The prices for incoming freshmen tuition and fees are a 5.9% increase from the 2017–18 academic year in response to state funding policies. Fall 2019 graduate tuition costs are $445.40 per credit hour for in-state tuition, and out-of-state tuition is $778.25 per credit hour.

The six-year graduation rate for the university's main campus was 61 percent. Bowling Green State University's six-year graduation rate exceeded its predicted rate of 47 percent. The university's was named in the top five positive differences between actual and expected graduation rates of similar public universities by U.S. News & World Report. Graduation rates for by race among this group are 60 percent unknown race, 60 percent white, 55 percent Asian-American, 50 percent African-American, 50 percent international students, 48 percent Hispanic-American, and 43 percent Native American students. Both its part-time MBA program and graduate program in education are ranked in U.S. News & World Report's 2019 Best Grad School Rankings, at 163 and 124, respectively.

=== Faculty and research ===
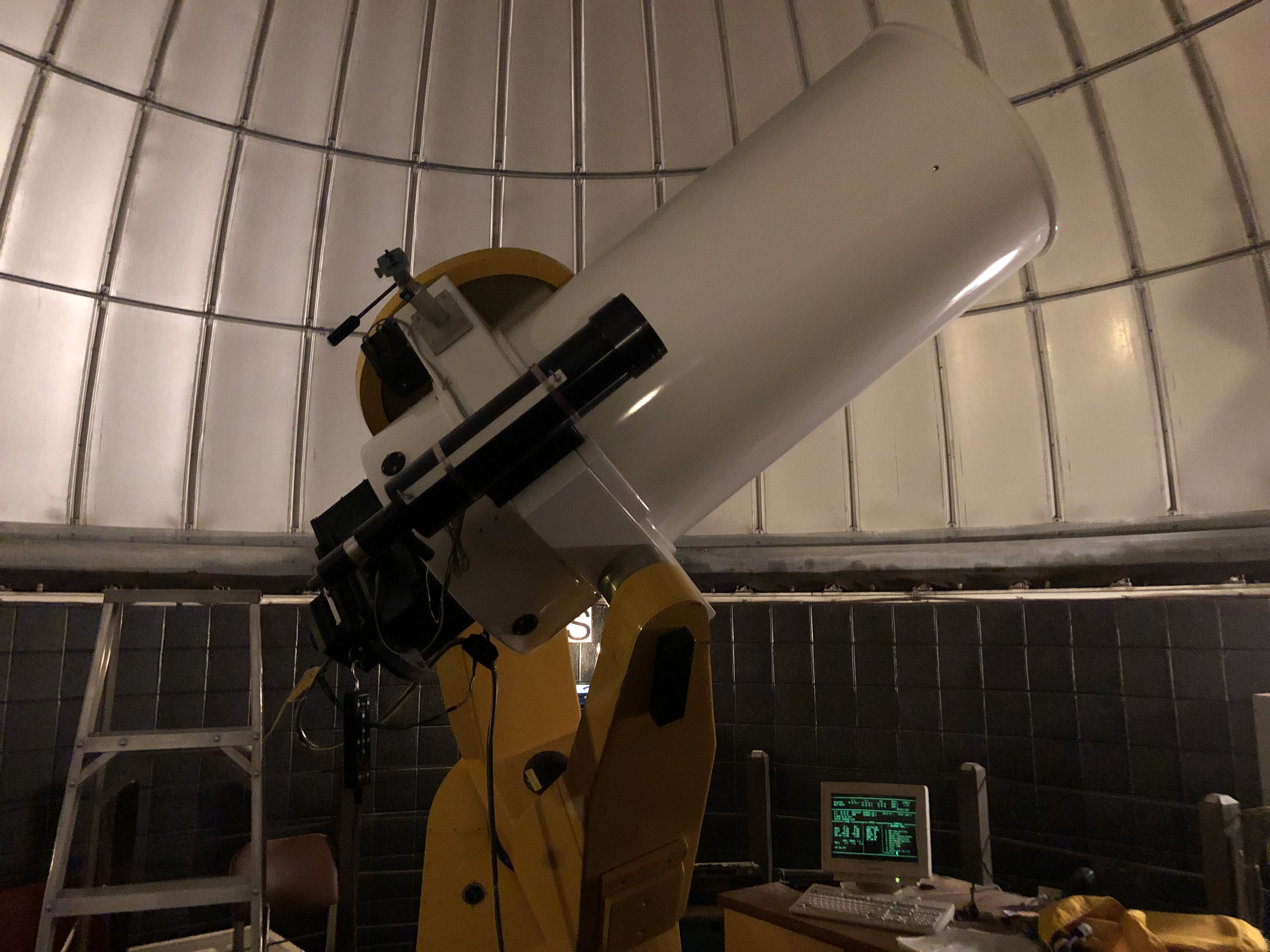
A reflecting telescope at Bowling Green State University

BGSU has a student-faculty ratio of 18:1. The university currently has 1,982 academic staff, including 797 full-time faculty, 312 adjunct faculty, and 873 graduate assistant and research staff. Since November 2010, BGSU full-time faculty have been represented in collective bargaining by the BGSU Faculty Association, a chapter of the American Association of University Professors.

In 1979, American author James Baldwin taught at BGSU for one quarter as a Distinguished Visiting Professor in the Ethnic Studies Department after a month-long stint as writer in residence in 1978.

The Carnegie Classification of Institutions of Higher Education classified Bowling Green State University as a Doctorate-granting Research University with high research activity.

The BGSU Center for Sustainability and the Environment conducts research on renewable energy such as solar energy and wind generation on Lake Erie, energy conversion, and using algae to generate biofuel. Research in conjunction with the University of Toledo created new ways to effectively determine appropriate Ohio windmill sites.

The "Center of Excellence for Health and Wellness Across the Lifespan" primarily focuses on research pertaining to areas such as physical health, substance use and abuse, mental health, voice and speech science, family and marriage research, and health communication. It houses the first National Center for Family & Marriage Research, established by the U.S. Department of Health and Human Services along with the Center for Family and Demographic Research, which received long-term funding by the National Institutes of Health for voice and speech science research.

=== Presidents ===
BGSU presidents include:

- Homer B. Williams (1912–1937)
- R. E. Offenhauer (1937–1938)
- Frank J. Prout (1938–1951)
- Ralph W. McDonald (1951–1961)
- Ralph G. Harshman (1961–1963)
- William Travers Jerome III (1963–1970)
- Hollis A. Moore Jr. (1970–1981)
- Paul J. Olscamp (1982–1995)
- Sidney A. Ribeau (1995–2008)
- Carol A. Cartwright (2008–2011)
- Mary Ellen Mazey (2011–2017)
- Rodney K. Rogers (2018–present)

== Athletics ==
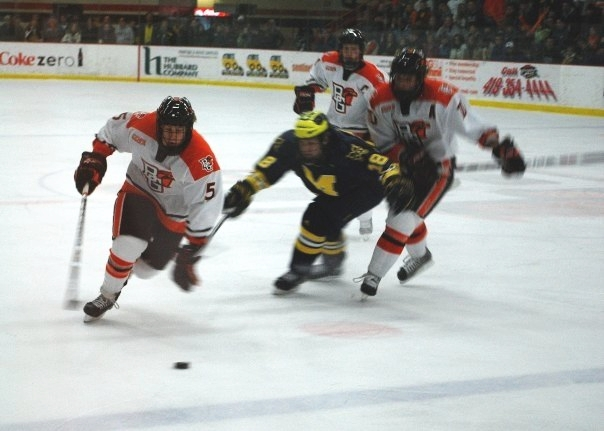
Bowling Green men's ice hockey vs. Michigan

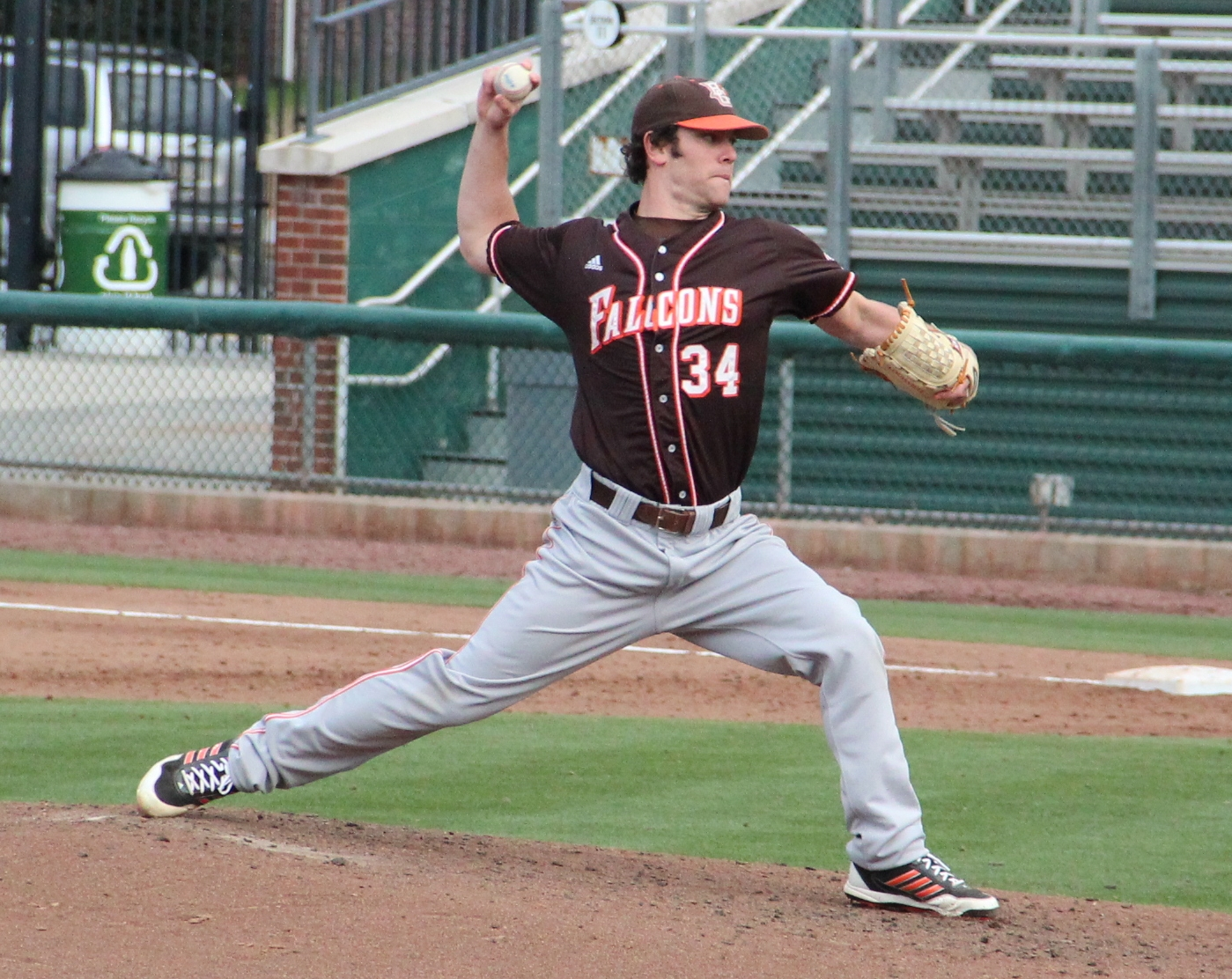
A Falcons baseball player during a 2014 game.

Bowling Green's athletic teams are known as the Falcons. The university participates in NCAA Division I as a member of the Mid-American Conference, part of the Football Bowl Subdivision. In ice hockey, the Falcons are members of the Central Collegiate Hockey Association. The Falcons' main rivals are the Rockets of the University of Toledo. Separated by just 20 miles (32 km) on Interstate 75, the two schools celebrate a heated rivalry in several sports. The most well-known of these games is the Battle of I-75, a football game held each year in which the winner takes home the Peace Pipe, a Native American peace pipe placed upon a wood tablet. The university sponsors 16 athletic teams: men's and women's basketball, men's and women's cross county, football, men's and women's golf, women's gymnastics, men's ice hockey, men's and women's soccer, softball, women's swimming, women's tennis, women's track and field, and women's volleyball.

In March 2024, Bowling Green announced that it had hired back Dennis Williams as the hockey team head coach.

The Falcons women's basketball teams had recent postseason success. The team won conference championships in women's basketball in 2005, 2006, and 2007. At the NCAA Women's Division I Basketball Championship, the Falcons lost in the first round in 2005 and 2006, but then reached the "Sweet Sixteen" in 2007. The 1984 Falcons hockey team defeated the University of Minnesota Duluth in the longest college hockey championship game in history, to win the NCAA National Championship. Former BGSU head football coach Doyt Perry led the Falcons to the NCAA "Small College" Football National Title and undefeated season in 1959. Several BGSU coaches have gone on to prominent careers. Football coach Urban Meyer went on to great success at the University of Florida, earning two BCS National Championship Game appearances in a three-year span, winning in 2007 and 2009. He also won the first College Football Playoff championship while coaching at Ohio State University in 2015. Hockey coach Jerry York became the winningest active coach in NCAA hockey, winning four NCAA National Championships at Boston College in 2001, 2008, 2010 and 2012 after his Bowling Green championship in 1984.

=== Club sports and events ===
BGSU offers a variety of sports at the club level. Men's sports include cross country/track and field, rugby, lacrosse, baseball, basketball, soccer and ice hockey. Women's club sports include rugby, cross country/track and field, Lacrosse, soccer, softball, equestrian, figure skating, and gymnastics. BGSU also offers co-ed club sports, such as fencing. The club rugby team has been very successful, winning the Fall 2018 D1AA championship. Also, in April 2011, BGSU hosted the National Club Track and Field Championships at Whittaker Track on the east end of campus. BGSU has had an esports team since 2014.

== Student life ==
=== Demographics ===
Student body composition as of May 2, 2022
| Race and ethnicity | Total |
|---|---|
| White | 80% |
| Black | 9% |
| Other (Note: Other consists of Multiracial Americans & those who prefer to not say.) | 5% |
| Hispanic | 4% |
| Asian | 1% |
| Foreign national | 1% |
Economic diversity
| Low-income (Note: The percentage of students who received an income-based federal Pell grant intended for low-income students.) | 30% |
| Affluent (Note: The percentage of students who are a part of the American middle class at the bare minimum.) | 70% |

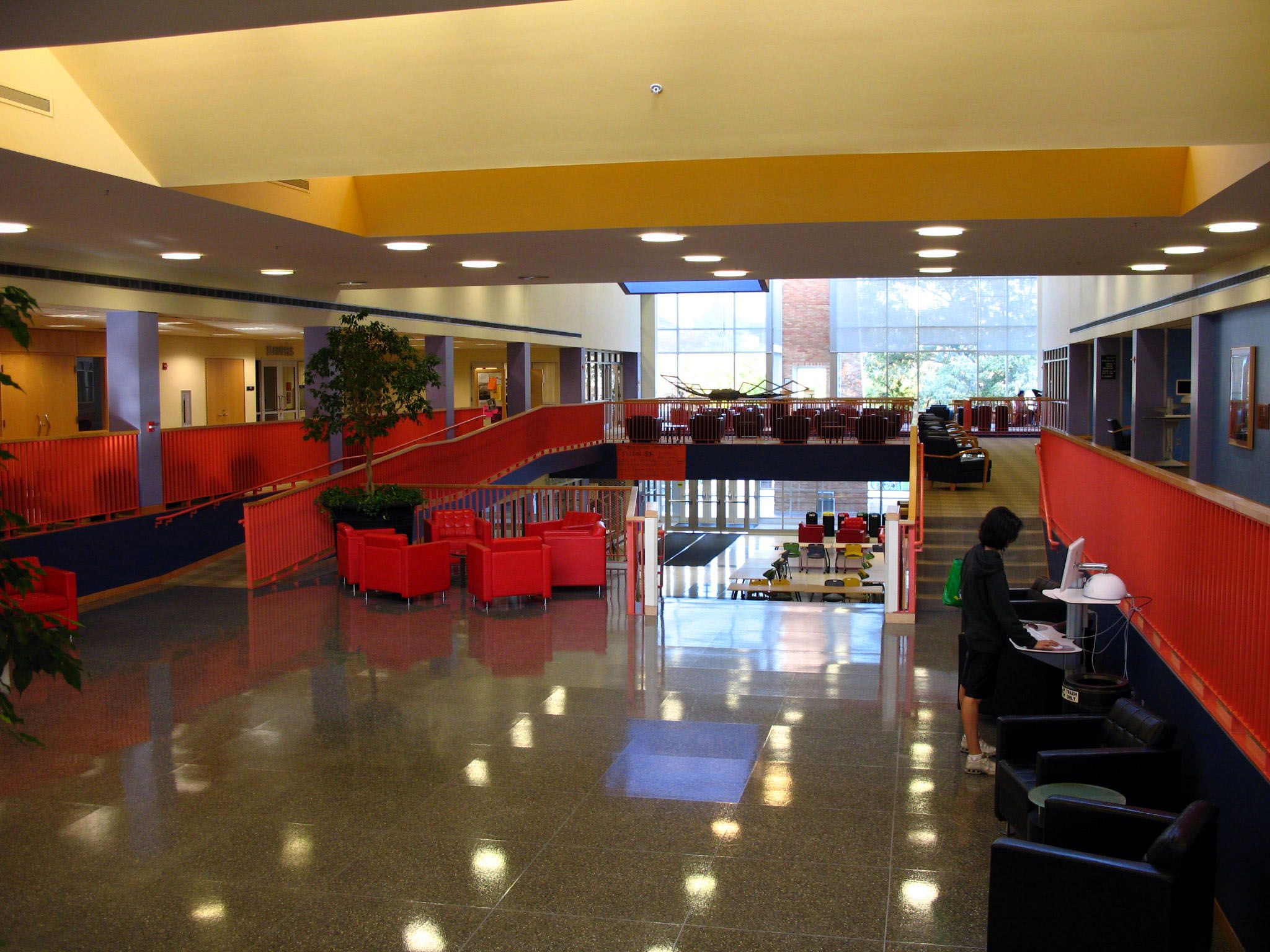
Interior of the Student Union

Ohio residents account for 85% of the undergraduate student population while out-of-state students come from all 50 US states and 70 foreign countries. The student body consists of 54% women and 46% men, of which, 22% are either of international origin or members of ethnic minority groups. Bowling Green had an on-campus residential student population of 6,500 students as of 2011. Approximately 85% are in-state students. The majority of students attend classes on BGSU's main campus. In addition to the main campus enrollment, 2,500 students enrolled in classes at BGSU Firelands as of 2011. 300 students attend classes at BGSU extension locations, and over 600 students attend classes via distance learning.

=== Activities ===
==== BGeXperience ====
In 2012 Bowling Green redesigned its undergraduate curriculum, creating an interdisciplinary program known as the BGeXperience (BGeX), that places a focus on personal growth and development, social connections, critical thinking, problem solving and diversity. First-year students begin the BGeX program during the BGeX Introduction Weekend prior to the start of the semester and continued taking courses designed to meet BGeX criteria throughout the four years of the undergraduate programs.

==== Outdoor Program ====
As part of the Department of Recreational Sports, the BGSU Outdoor Program offers outdoor trips, an indoor climbing wall, team-building, and an outdoor equipment rental center to BGSU students, faculty, staff and surrounding community members. In August 2008 the program introduced the Freshman Wilderness Experience, which couples a week-long backpacking trip on the Appalachian Trail with a monthly class to assist students in transitioning from high school to college life. In 2009 The Outdoor Program won the David J Web Award by the Association of Outdoor Recreation and Education (AORE) as an outstanding non-profit outdoor program.

=== Student organizations ===
The university has an extensive student life program, with over 300 student organizations; club and recreational sports programs; nationally ranked living-learning communities and freshmen experience programs; student media organizations and publications; and Greek organizations. In BGSU's residential learning communities, students with similar interests, majors, cultural connections, and goals live and study together. In the academically based communities students work closely with faculty members who teach classes and have offices in the residence hall.

=== Greek life ===
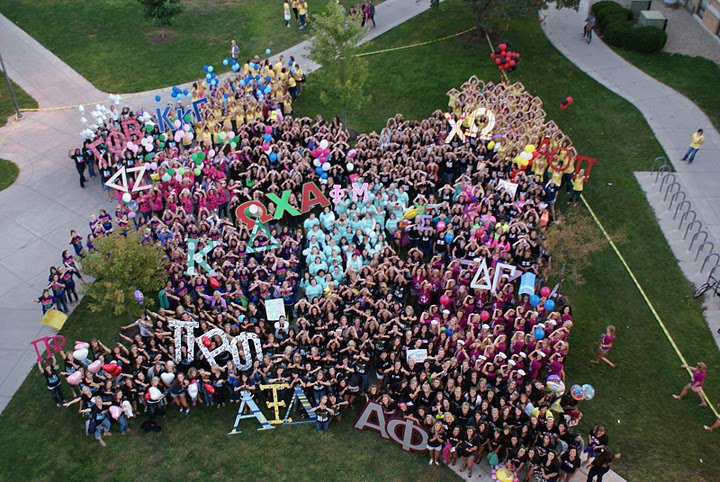
Members of the College Panhellenic Conference gather outside of the Student Union.

In 2014, BGSU demolished its Greek Town Homes located on old Fraternity Row, old Sorority Row, and the North and South Greek Conklin buildings and finished construction of a new Greek Village in 2016. The current Greek Village consists of ten buildings divided into 33 sections.

In 2021, Bowling Green student Stone Foltz died as a result of alcohol poisoning at the Delta Beta chapter of Pi Kappa Alpha International Fraternity. Two of the fraternity's members were found guilty for hazing Foltz and given jail sentences.

=== Media and publications ===
==== Newspaper ====
Campus newspapers include the independent student newspaper, The BG News, published since 1920. It was known as the Bee Gee News before assuming its current name on September 21, 1951. The paper is available for free at 135 newsstands. In 2009 the paper became available on the Internet as an online newspaper. The paper prints Monday and Thursday during the fall and spring semesters.

The university's independent, student operated yearbook was first published in 1918 but stopped after one edition for six years. In 1924 it resumed production and was published every year as a record of students, activities, and events for a given year. In 2008, the yearbook was replaced with a magazine format, The Key Magazine, and is published semi-annually, in fall and spring semesters.

==== Broadcasting ====
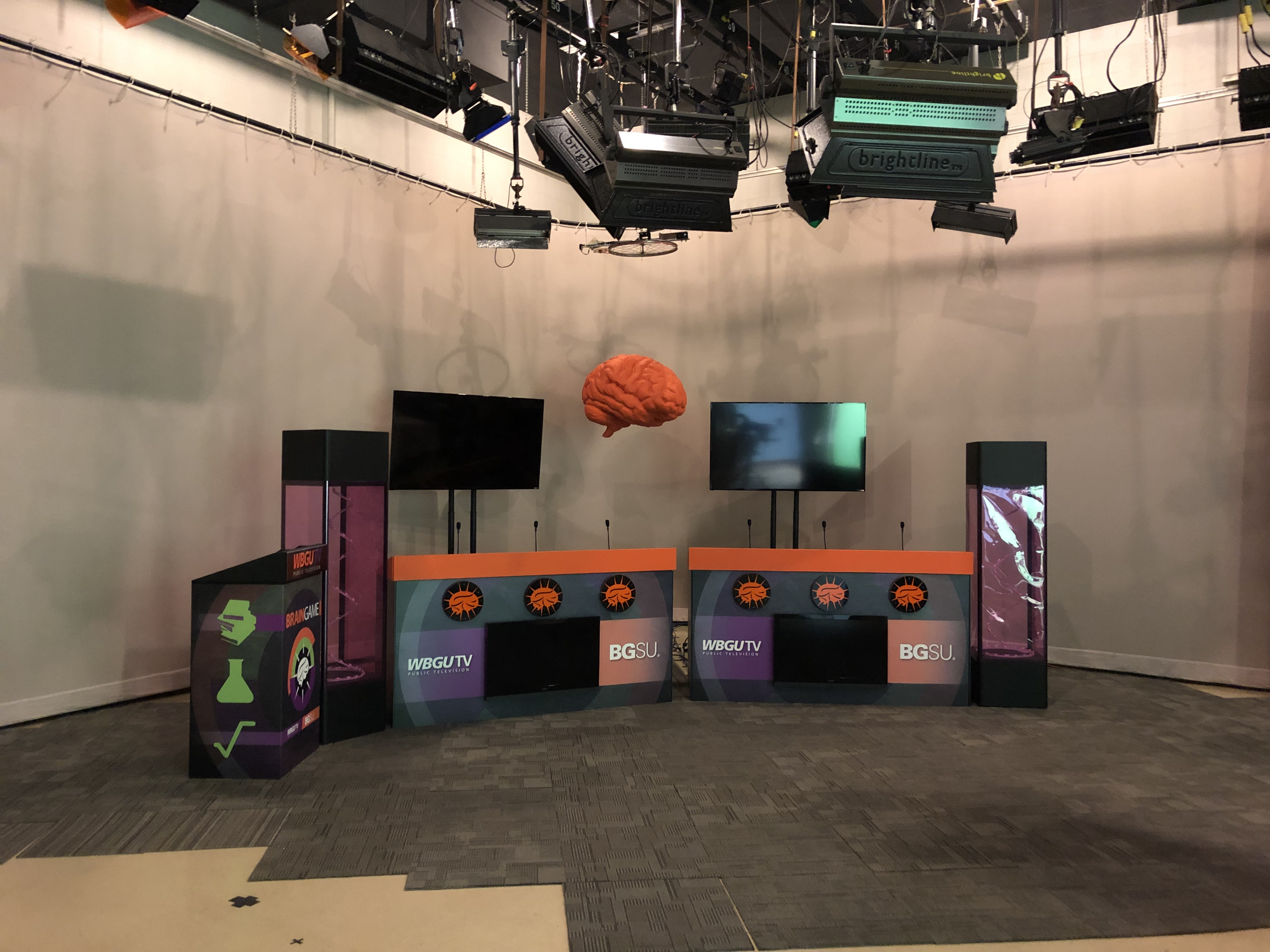
Part of the WBGU-TV recording studio

Electronic media on campus includes two radio stations and one public television station, as well as student-produced television. BGSU's Public Broadcasting Service affiliate, WBGU-TV, broadcasts to nineteen counties in northwestern and west central Ohio and hosts PBS programming, local programming and BG24 News, a student-run television newscast airing live at 5:30 pm twice a week. The campus is home to two student-operated radio stations as part of the Department of Telecommunications. WBGU 88.1 FM and WFAL Falcon Radio. WBGU-FM serves as an independent radio, non-commercial educational (NCE), FCC-licensed station that focuses mostly on independent music programming and broadcasts women's basketball and hockey; while WFAL Falcon Radio, formerly WFAL 1610 AM, is a student-run commercial radio station that broadcasts music including Modern rock, Top 40, hip-hop and talk shows. Both radio stations host news and sports talk shows and BGSU athletic events through partnerships with other student-media organizations. The Bowling Green Radio News Organization (BGRNO) provides radio news coverage Monday–Friday through student-produced shows; while the Falcon Media Sports Network (FMSN) formally known as the Bowling Green Radio Sports Organization (BGRSO) broadcasts BGSU athletic events on WBGU-FM and WFAL as well as local high school sports on WFAL.

==== Journals ====
The Mid-American Review is an international literary journal published through the BGSU Department of English. The Mid-American Review showcases contemporary fiction, poetry, nonfiction, and translations. It was created in 1980 when the format changed from a student-published literary magazine, known as the Itinerary, to an international publication. Prairie Margins is a national undergraduate literary journal published by students in the Creative Writing Program. The annual journal features literary work by both BGSU students and undergraduate creative writers from other institutions. The Projector is a peer-reviewed electronic journal on film, media and culture published twice a year by the Department of Theatre & Film.

=== Traditions and events ===
==== Mascots ====
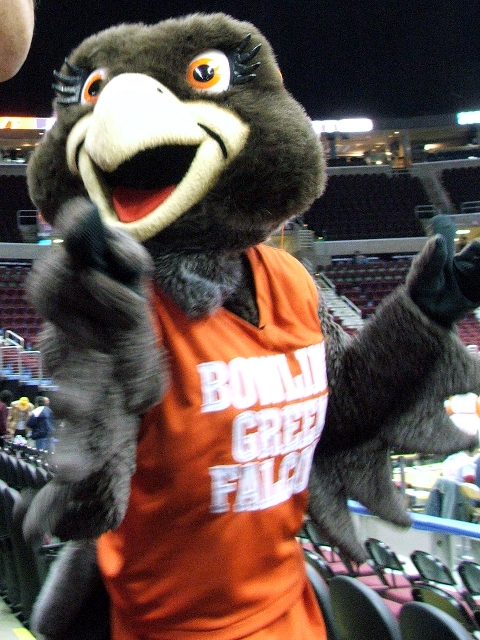
Frieda Falcon at a basketball game

BGSU's official mascots are Freddie and Frieda Falcon. Freddie Falcon began appearing at athletic events in 1950, while Frieda first appeared on February 25, 1966, as Mrs. Freddie Falcon. Frieda returned in the 1980–81 academic year as Freddie's little sister. 1980 marked the first official female Frieda after the 1966 version was played by a male cheerleader. Freddie and Frieda routinely make appearances at BGSU athletic events and other major events around campus and the community. In a similar tradition to SICSIC, the identities of the students who play Freddie and Frieda are not revealed until the end of the basketball and hockey seasons.

SICSIC is an official spirit organization and secret society at BGSU that began in 1946 by President Frank J. Prout. SICSIC routinely attends major BGSU sporting events and other campus activities promoting school spirit. The organization is secret and contains six members, two each for sophomore, junior and senior classes. Two new members are chosen at the end of their class's freshman year to replace that year's two graduating seniors. The group is characterized by their use of gray jumpsuits and masks of famous pop culture and political figures to hide their identities, which are not revealed until the last home basketball game of their senior year.

==== Events ====
BGSU currently is the home of Ohio's largest student-run philanthropy, Dance Marathon. BGSU's chapter is one of the largest and most active Dance Marathon organizations in the nation. BGSU Dance Marathon operates similar to other dance marathon events held nationwide at other college. The event is run entirely by college students and the proceeds go to local children's hospitals. Funds raised through BGSU's Dance Marathon benefit children at the Mercy Children's Hospital in Toledo via the Children's Miracle Network. 2011 marked the 16th year the BG has conducted the Dance Marathon. Since the event began, it has raised over $2.2 million for the Children's Hospital.

Bowling Green hosts an annual event for three days in February similar to other winter cities to celebrate winter, snow, and cold weather activities. Winterfest was first held in 2009 and centers around the town's rich ice skating and ice hockey traditions. Winterfest events are held all over Bowling Green. Many of the on campus events are held at the Slater Family Ice Arena, including curling, skating, ice hockey and figure skating exhibitions.

Bowling Green hosted the American Legion event known as Buckeye Boys State from 1978 to 2016. The program gathered high school juniors from all over Ohio for a nine-day program in June. At Buckeye Boys State, the students operated a full government modeled after the Government of Ohio.

=== Marching band ===
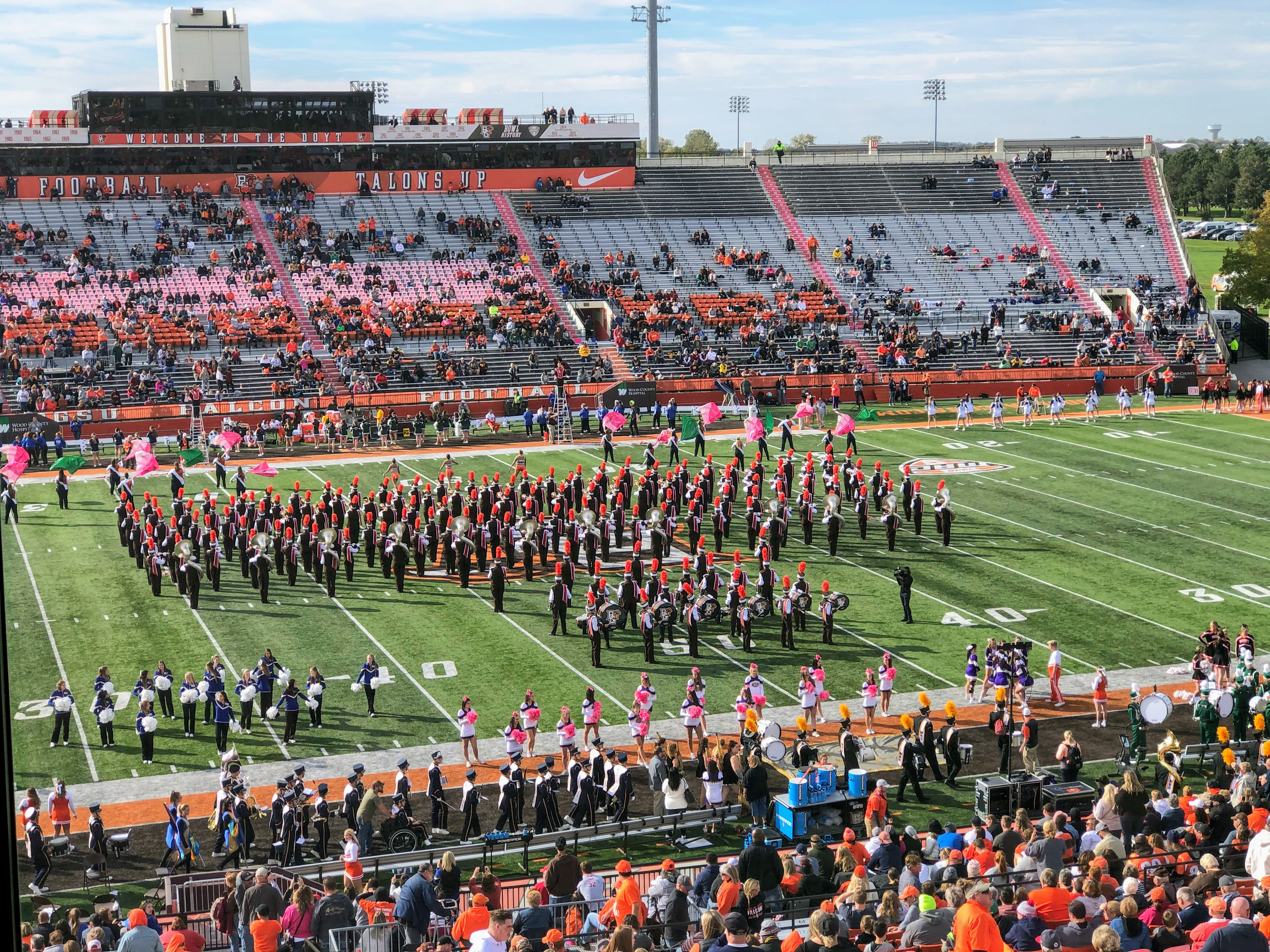
The Falcon Marching Band performing at Doyt Perry Stadium

The Falcon Marching Band is the largest student organization at BGSU, with approximately 425 members in 2024. The band performs at home football games and other university functions including select road football games and various bowl games including the Raisin Bowl in Fresno, California, Silver Bowl in Las Vegas, Nevada, the Motor City Bowl in Detroit, Michigan, the GMAC Bowl in Mobile, Alabama, the Humanitarian Bowl in Boise, Idaho, the Military Bowl in Washington, D.C., and the Little Caesars Pizza Bowl in Detroit. In 2007, the band was invited to the Bands of America Regional in Indianapolis, Indiana. The Athletic Band is an auditioned group that at most basketball and hockey games as well as other university events.

The first band to represent what would become Bowling Green State University was formed during the 1923–1924 academic year. Making its first appearance early during the football season, the band's premier performance that year as at the dedication of the new athletic field at Homecoming. The Falcon Marching Band, features a symphonic sound and chair step marching that rivals bands of larger conferences. The 250-member marching band is the largest student organization on campus. The band performs at all home football games, which are hosted in Doyt Perry Stadium as well as other various university functions. The Falcon Marching Band only exists during the football season.

== Notable alumni ==
Alumni of Bowling Green State University have become notable in a variety of different fields including politics and government, business, science, literature, arts and entertainment, and athletics. A number of Bowling Green Falcons have excelled at the collegiate, Olympic, and professional levels sports, including: Kevin Bieksa, Rob Blake, Dan Bylsma, Scott Hamilton, Dave Wottle, Orel Hershiser, Mike McCullough, George McPhee, Ken Morrow, Don Nehlen, Jordan Sigalet, Nate Thurmond, and Mark Wells.

Alumni involved in government and politics include: former Israeli ambassador Daniel Ayalon, Ohio state senator Theresa Gavarone, Ohio Department of Higher Education chancellor Randy Gardner, current Ohio congressman Bob Latta and former congressman Tim Ryan. Other notable alumni include: explorer Conrad Allen; filmmaker and conservationist Justin Grubb, author Philana Marie Boles; TCU chancellor Victor J. Boschini; actor Tim Conway; former ESPN sportscaster Jay Crawford;CBS News Correspondent Steve Hartman; ESPN sportscaster Jason Jackson; NHL Network host Steve Mears; Adobe Systems president and CEO Shantanu Narayen; Owens Corning CEO Brian Chambers, actress Eva Marie Saint; Adena Williams Loston, president of St. Philip's College, Sri Lankan Entrepreneur and animal welfare advocate, Otara Gunewardene, author James Carlos Blake, winner of the Los Angeles Times Book Prize; Bram Stoker Award-winning author, Jeff Strand; and Grammy Award and Pulitzer Prize-winning composer, Jennifer Higdon.
