= Conrad Allen =

American inventor and geologist

Conrad Keene Allen
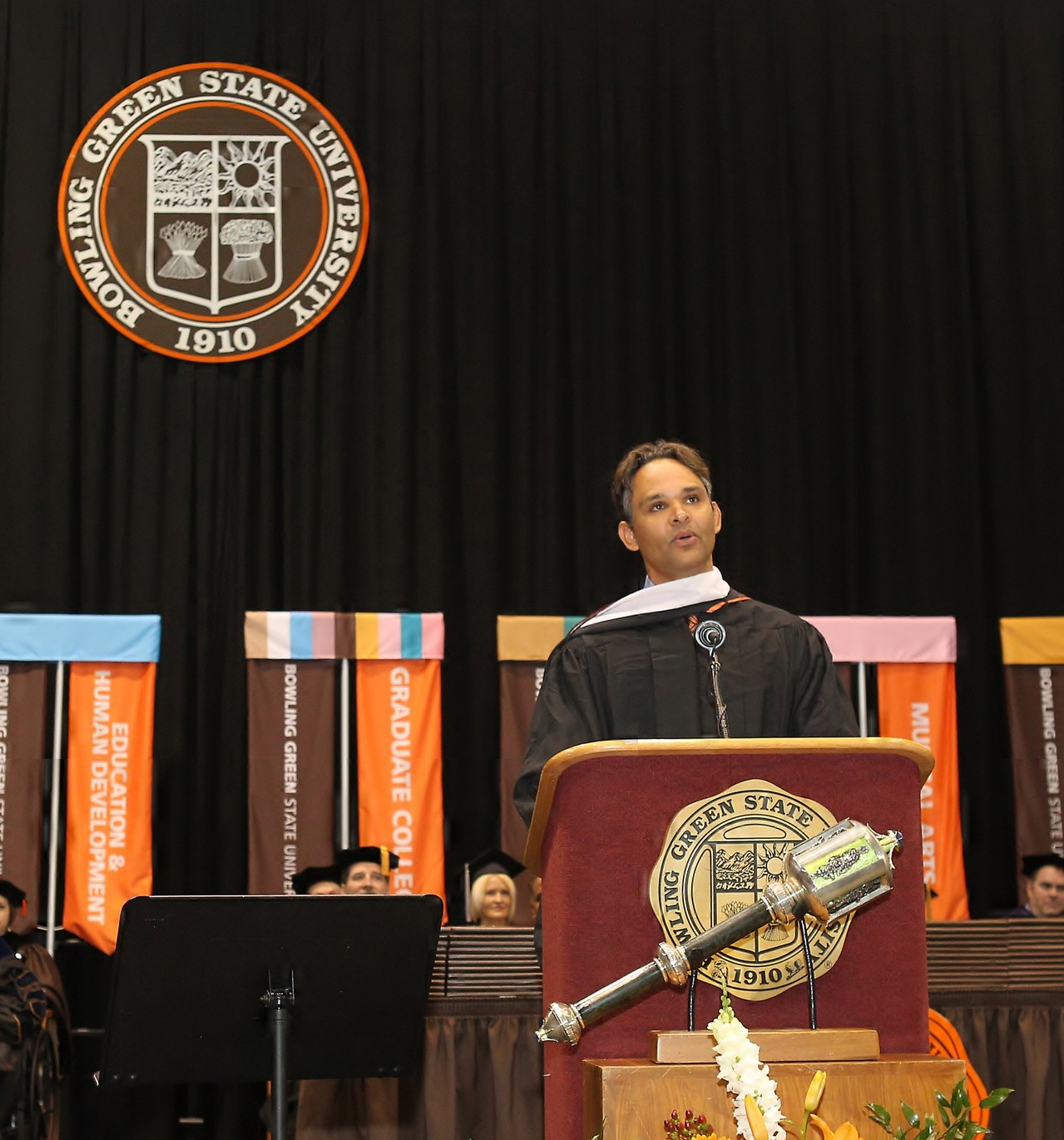
- Allen delivering commencement address at Bowling Green in 2011.
- Born: Marion, Illinois
- Citizenship: USA
- Education: Bowling Green
- Known for: Inventor of the Helium Junction and
- Scientific career
- Fields: Geology, Sequence Stratigraphy, Geophysics
- Workplaces: Exxonmobil Saudi Aramco

Conrad Keene Allen (born 1968 in Marion, Illinois) is an American inventor and Exploration Geologist. While exploring for oil in the Middle East, Allen discovered and mapped one of the largest helium reserves in the world. He is the inventor of the Helium Junction, which utilizes nanotechnology to separate isotopic helium from an aqueous fluid. He is on the team that invented An iterative and repeatable workflow for comprehensive data and processes integration for petroleum exploration and production assessments.

A recognized expert in natural resource Exploration & Production, Allen served two terms on the National Petroleum Council in Washington D.C.; first appointed in 2000 by Secretary of Energy Bill Richardson and reappointed in 2003 by Secretary Spencer Abraham. A favorite of political moderates, Allen formed a Congressional Exploratory Committee (TX-02) to challenge incumbent Ted Poe in 2009. Allen's committee notably included Texas Gubernatorial Candidate Chris Bell and US Senate Candidate Barbara Radnofsky. Allen garnered broad support in Texas and Washington D.C. before announcing that district gerrymandering engineered by Tom Delay rendered the district out of reach for a near term challenge. Poe returned to Congress unopposed. Allen name is often mentioned on the short list of potential candidates for US Congress and Texas Railroad Commissioner.

Allen delivered a notable Commencement Address at Bowling Green State University in 2011 where he encouraged graduates to use their education as an intellectual compass to guide them towards practical discovery and innovation, recognizing fellow alum Shantanu Narayen, CEO of Adobe Systems, who was present to receive an Honorary Doctorate. It was the last graduation ceremony held in Anderson Arena and the last presided over by President Cartwright. Allen is a Distinguished Graduate of the Department of Geology, Bowling Green State University, Bowling Green, Ohio which awards the Conrad & Deanna Allen Scholarship annually. Allen delivered a historic speech in Salt Lake City, Utah before the American Association of Petroleum Geologists urging the alliance between AAPG, NABGG and AWG and noting what he called a Social Sequence Boundary in the Oil Industry.

Allen is a former U.S. Army Officer earning Airborne Wings, the National Defense Service Medal, Army Commendation Medal and the Army Achievement Medal. He was an adjunct professor of geology at the University of Houston–Downtown.
