= Bowling Green State University College of Education and Human Development =

BGSU College of Education and Human Development
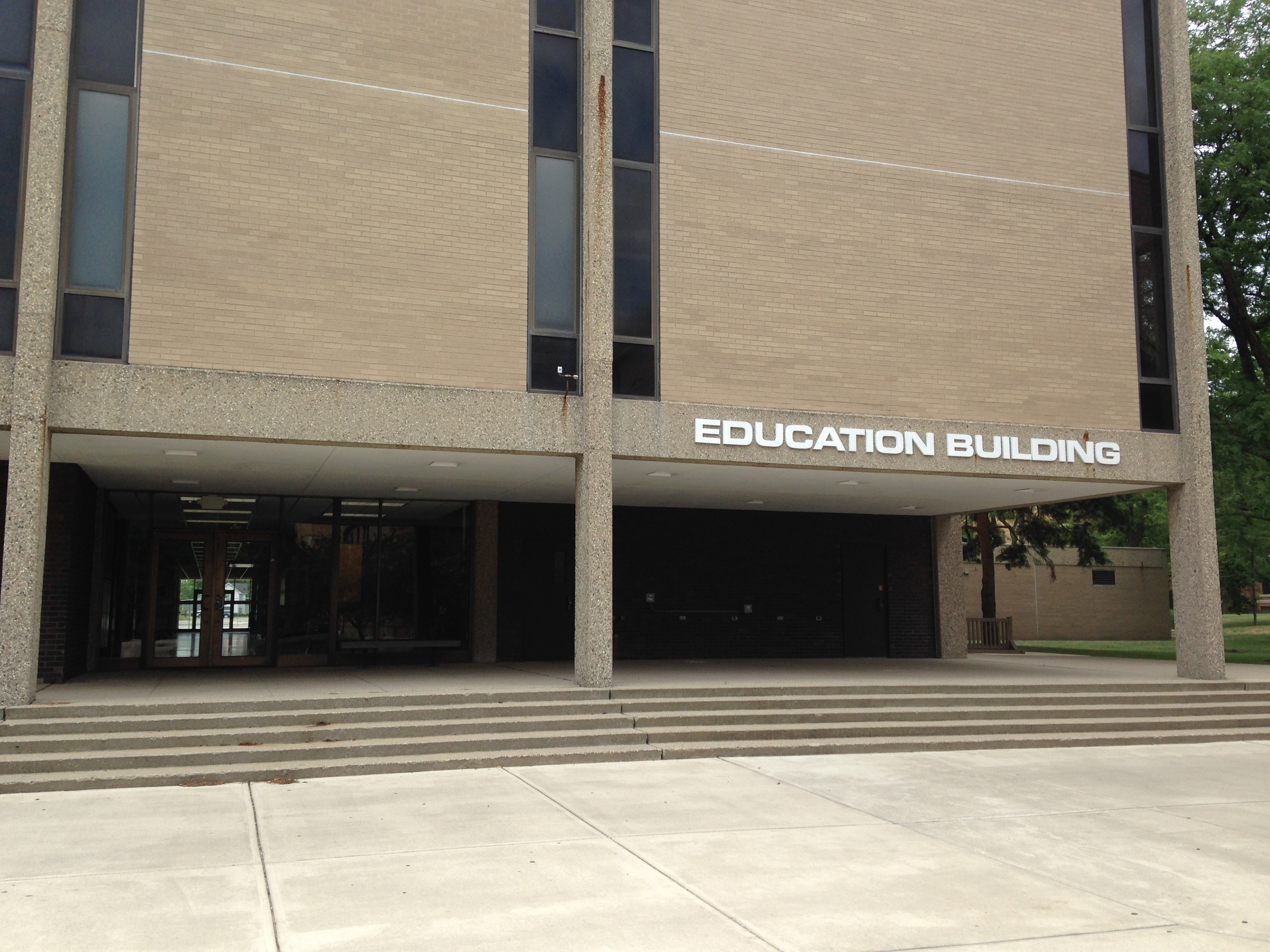
- Dean: Dawn Shinew
- Academic staff: 139
- Students: 9,145
- Location: Bowling Green, Ohio, U.S.
- Website: Website

Bowling Green State University College of Education and Human Development is the School of education at Bowling Green State University in Bowling Green, Ohio, United States. The college offers curriculum for both undergraduate and graduate students (including doctoral).

== Schools ==
=== Family and Consumer Sciences ===
The School of Family and Consumer Sciences offers undergraduate programs in Apparel Merchandising and Product Development, Food and Nutrition, Human Development and Family Studies, and Interior Design. These programs prepare students for careers and provide a background for students wanting to pursue advanced degrees. The school offers a graduate program with a specialization in Food and Nutrition.

Program areas offer undergraduate research and internship opportunities.

=== Human Movement, Sport, and Leisure Studies ===
BG's Sport Management Program is one of the top programs in the country. BGSU offers both undergraduate and graduate programs accredited by The North American Society for Sport Management (NASSM) and the National Association for Sport and Physical Education (NASPE) through The School of Human Movement, Sport, and Leisure Studies. Degree programs are split into two divisions: the Kinesiology Division offers undergraduate majors in Dance, Exercise Science, Human Movement Science, and Physical Education Teacher Education. The Exercise Science program has gained recognition by the National Strength and Conditionining Association. The Sport Management, Recreation, and Tourism Division offers undergraduate majors in Athletic Training/Clinic Management, Recreation, Sport Management, and Tourism. The Graduate Program includes specializations in Developmental Kinesiology (biomechanics, exercise physiology, exercise psychology, motor learning and motor development, physical education teacher education, and sport psychology), Sport Administration, and Leisure and Tourism.

=== School of Intervention Services ===
The school develops and implements instructional programs for students that deliver educational programs for persons with exceptional education and mental health needs.
