= Freddie and Frieda Falcon =

Mascots of Bowling Green State University

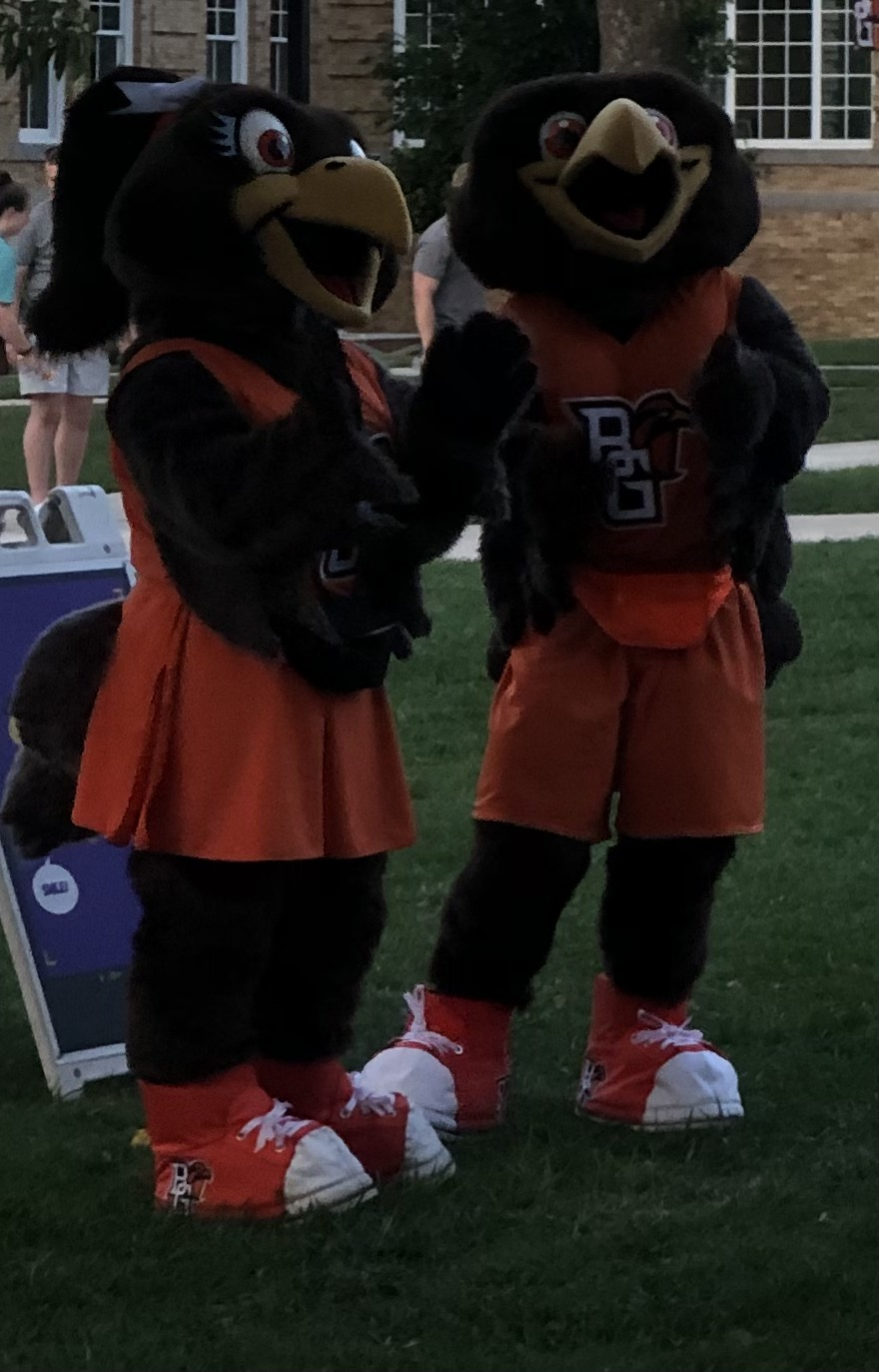
- BGSU Mascots, Freddie and Frieda Falcon
- University: Bowling Green State University
- Conference: MAC
- Description: Anthropomorphized peregrine falcons
- First seen: 1950 (Freddie), 1979 (Frieda)

Freddie and Frieda Falcon are the mascots of Bowling Green State University in Bowling Green, Ohio. The pair are anthropomorphized peregrine falcons. They are somewhat of a rarity among collegiate mascots, being one of the few male-female mascot pairs in existence. In 2006 they were both named "Best Collegiate Mascot" at the 2006 NCA Cheer Camp in Nashville, Tennessee at Vanderbilt University.

== The Falcon ==
Bowling Green State University was originally known as Bowling Green State Normal College, designated a normal school because its purpose was to train teachers. Because of this, their athletic teams were referred to by a variety of nicknames, such as the "B.G. Normals" and the "Teachers". As the necessity of a mascot and nickname became more apparent over the years, Ivan "Doc" Lake, the sports editor of the local newspaper, decided to come up with a fitting name. In 1927, after reading about falconry, he decided on "Falcons" because the birds were powerful and highly trained, much like the University's athletes.

== History ==
A creation of the Alpha Phi Omega fraternity, Freddie Falcon made his first appearance at a BGSU men's basketball game on January 16, 1950 against the Bobcats of Ohio University. Under the mask at this first appearance was Bob Taylor. The costume was simple – a papier mache head, a cape and a brown sweatsuit – but the tradition had begun.

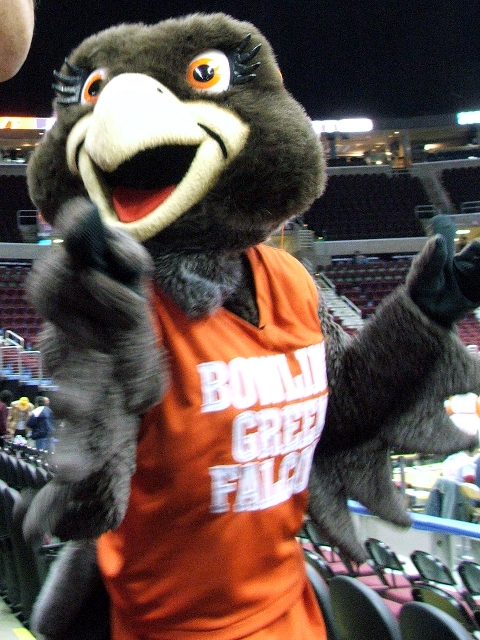
Frieda Falcon at Anderson Arena

Frieda Falcon first appeared on February 25, 1966 as "Mrs. Freddie Falcon". At this time, she was a male cheerleader in disguise. In 1974 Freddie took Frieda to the Homecoming Game. Frieda's costume was borrowed from a woman in town who had worn it to a Halloween party. The costume was worn by a member of the Spirit and Traditions board. In 1980, Frieda was re-introduced as Freddie's little sister. The first full-time female Frieda was Sue Sheard.

Over the years the costume has changed and evolved, going from a papier mache head to a "rubber chicken"-like mask, to the current look, which is a more typical 'cartoon'-like appearance and a head made of fiberglass and synthetic material designed to replicate the appearance of feathers.

== Traditions ==
The biggest tradition of the mascot position is that the identities of the students who play the roles of Freddie and Frieda are kept secret for the duration of their service. The identities are revealed every spring at a "beheading ceremony" during a basketball game or hockey game.

Other traditions have included the throwing of bubblegum and the wearing of orange Chuck Taylor shoes, which are now represented by large comical high-top shoes with the BGSU logo on them.
