= Bowling Green State University College of Arts and Sciences =

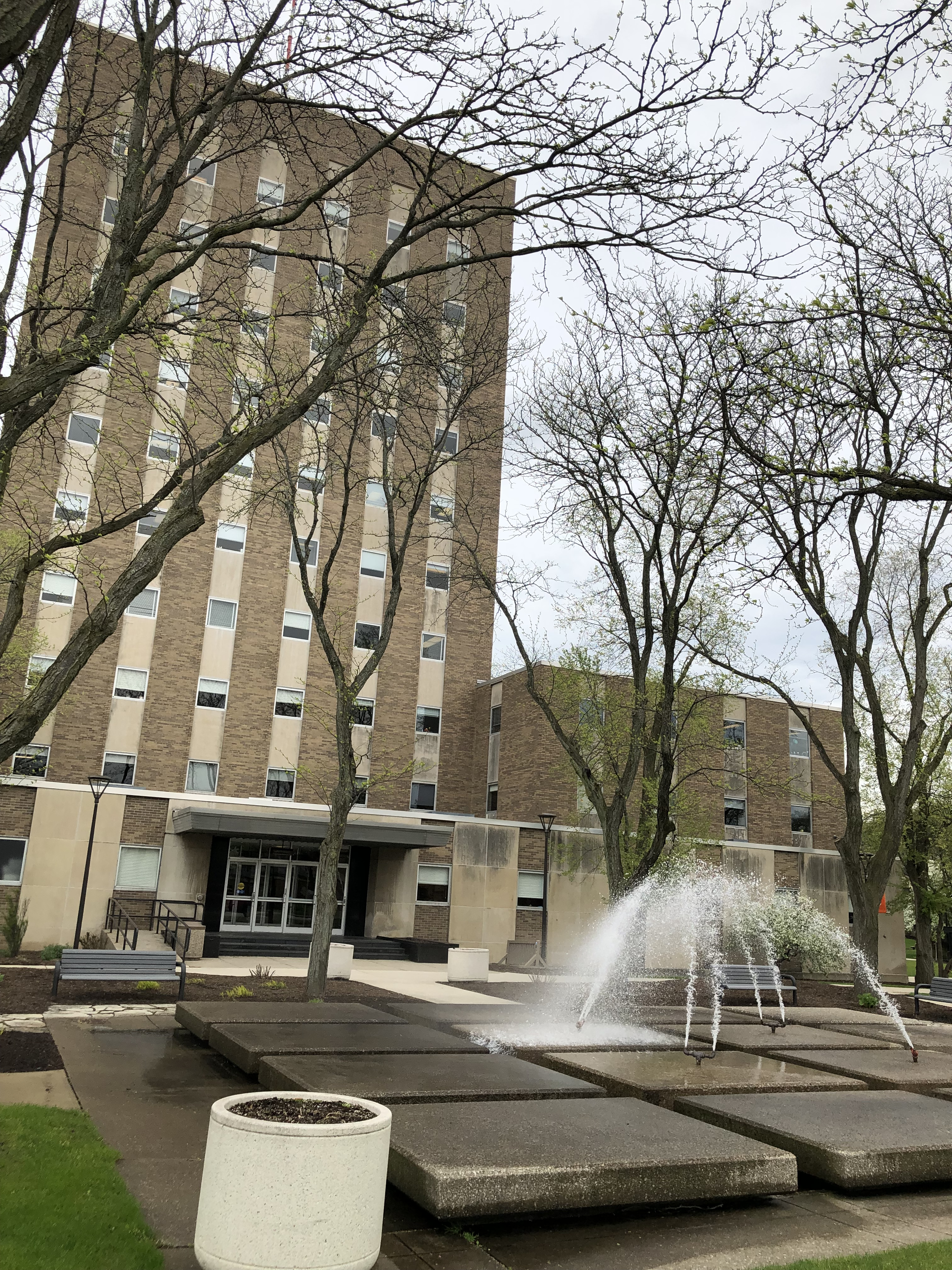
- Established: 1929
- Dean: Dale Klopfer (Interim)
- Faculty: 500
- Location: Bowling Green, Ohio, U.S.
- Website: Website

Bowling Green State University College of Arts and Sciences is the College of Arts and Sciences at Bowling Green State University in Bowling Green, Ohio. The college offers curriculum for both undergraduate and graduate students (including doctoral).

The college was founded in 1929 as the College of Liberal Arts, and is the largest college at BGSU, with 21 departments and 4 schools offering more than 100 areas of study and nine interdisciplinary programs. Graduate programs in the College of Arts and Sciences include 12 doctoral and 25 master's degree programs.

== Notable departments ==
=== Applied Philosophy ===
According to the Philosophical Gourmet Report, BGSU's Ph.D. program in Applied Philosophy ranks in the top group (programs 1-6) in the English-speaking world in the area of Applied Ethics, along with programs at Harvard University and the University of Oxford. The Report also notes BGSU's significant strengths in the areas of political philosophy, Meta-ethics, and normative ethics/moral psychology Students and faculty benefit from the activities of BGSU's Social Philosophy and Policy Center, which has a long history of bringing excellent scholars to campus.

=== Popular culture ===
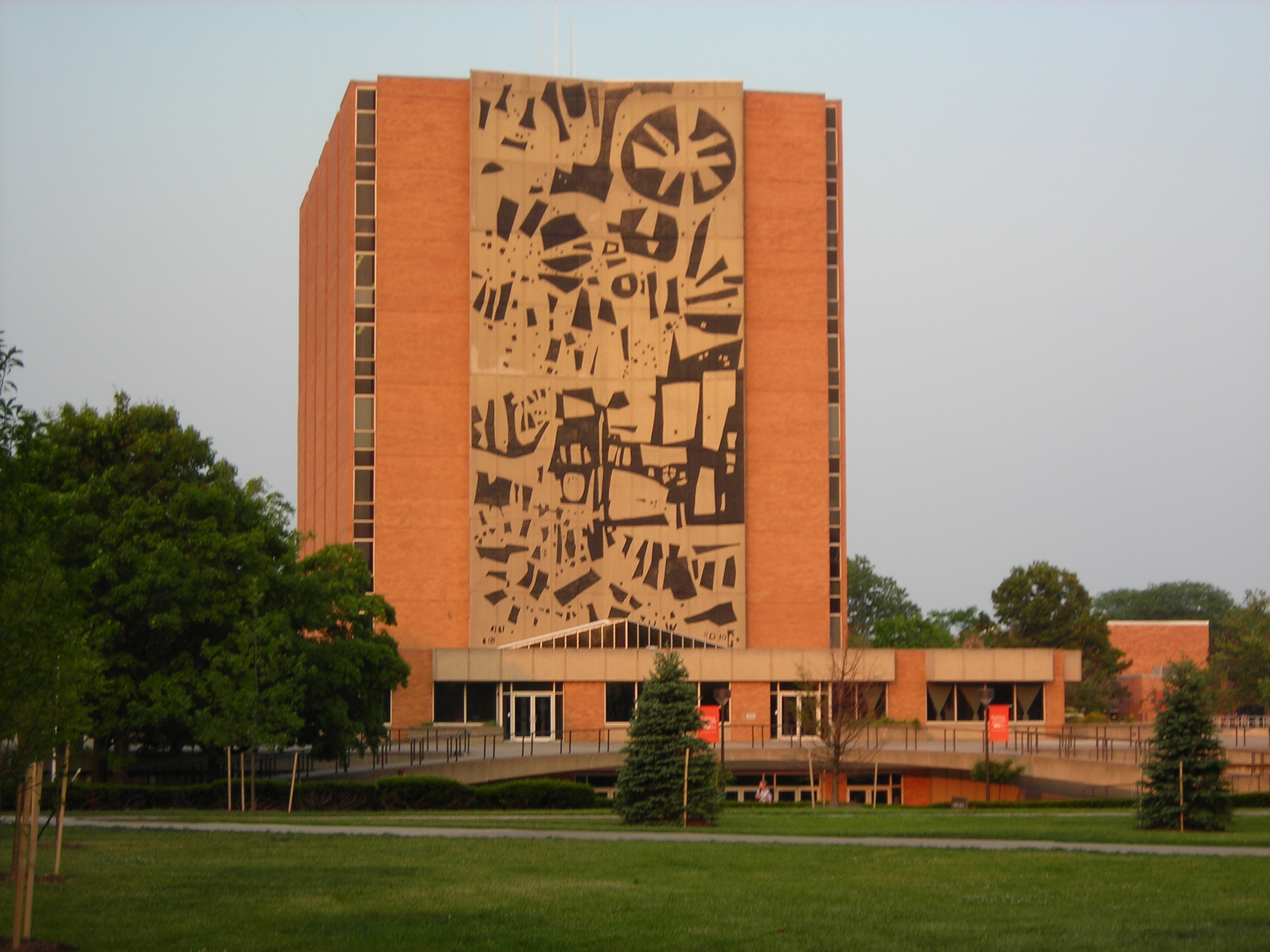
Jerome Library on BGSU's main Campus

BGSU's Popular Culture Department is a unique component of the university. Not only is Popular Culture the first department of its kind in the country, but its founder, Dr. Ray B. Browne, also established The Journal of Popular Culture and the national Popular Culture Association, both of which are widely known and respected to this day. By extension, BGSU also has quite an extensive popular culture library, the Browne Popular Culture Library. The Music Library and Sound Recordings Archives in the Jerome Library contains over 1 million titles (mostly on vinyl), making it the third-largest collection of popular music in the world.

=== Psychology ===
The university's Ph.D. program in Industrial-Organizational Psychology program is ranked #3 in the nation (behind Michigan State and Minnesota and ahead of Penn State and Illinois) by the U.S. News & World Report. BGSU's Industrial-Organizational Psychology program was founded by noted Industrial-Organizational psychologists Robert Guion and Patricia Cain Smith.

=== Sociology ===
The sociology department often works in close conjunction with the National Center for Family and Marriage Research, which it shares a building with. The center was established on September 15, 2007 through a cooperative effort between the university and the United States Department of Health and Human Services Office of the Assistant Secretary For Planning and Evaluation.

=== Computer Science ===
The Department of Computer Science was founded in 1969, with Dr. David L. Fulton appointed as founding chair in 1970.

From June 25 through June 17, 1975, the Department of Computer Science hosted the second Association for Computing Machinery SIGGRAPH conference.
