= Mary Peck =

American photographer (born 1952)

- Born: Mary Elizabeth Peck; 1952 (age 73–74); Minneapolis, Minnesota, U.S.
- Occupation: Photographer

Mary Elizabeth Peck (born 1952) is an American photographer. She has been active in Santa Fe, New Mexico and Seattle, Washington.

Her work is included in the collections of the Museum of Fine Arts Houston, the Denver Art Museum, the Art Institute of Chicago, the University of Michigan Museum of Art, and the Smithsonian American Art Museum.
