= The Hilltop (newspaper) =

Student newspaper of Howard University

- The newspaper on January 20, 2009, on the first inauguration of Barack Obama
- Type: Student Newspaper
- Format: Print/Online Publication
- Owner: Howard University
- Founded: January 22, 1924
- Language: English
- Headquarters: Howard University, Washington, D.C., U.S.
- Website: thehilltoponline.com

The Hilltop is the student newspaper of Howard University, a historically black college located in Washington, D.C. Co-founded in 1924 by Harlem Renaissance writer Zora Neale Hurston and Louis Eugene King, The Hilltop is the first and only daily newspaper at a historically black college or university (HBCU) in the United States.

== Inner workings ==
The newspaper is a color tabloid with a print circulation of 7,000. Student activities fees collected from the student body partially support the newspaper, however, the bulk of the paper's operating budget comes from advertising revenue. The Hilltop boasts a full paid staff which consists of majors ranging from print journalism to biology.

The editor in chief is responsible for the daily operations of running the paper and overseeing the staff. The editor in chief is responsive to "The Hilltop Policy Board", which consists of the editor in chief, Business Manager, elected student body leaders and several administrators (including the Dean of the School of Communications and the Journalism Department Chair) – each holding one equal vote. The board meets several times a year, most importantly to vote on an operating budget and student activities fee allotment for the newspaper and to select the successors to the editor in chief and Business Manager. The board has no jurisdiction to censor the newspaper in any way.

The Business Manager is responsible for overseeing the financial operations of the newspaper and reports to the editor in chief. However, like the editor in chief, The Business Manager is elected by and can only be dismissed by The Hilltop Policy Board.

The rest of the staff is hired and may be dismissed by the editor in chief.

== History ==
The Hilltop was co-founded by acclaimed author and Howard alumna Zora Neale Hurston. The first issue of The Hilltop was published January 22, 1924. The front page of the first issue covered a timeless and sensitive Howard issue: registration follies. The paper was brief, chronicling events that took place the semester before, and touching on a few upcoming campus events.

By 1929, the newspaper was published bi-monthly. A year later, in 1930, The Hilltop became a weekly newspaper and remained so for 71 years.

Within that time, the paper progressed steadily as a forum for African-American writers to hone their journalistic skills.

Much of early 20th century media relentlessly portrayed Black Americans in a negative light. Although The Hilltop was not a professional paper, stories were often published to combat those stereotypes and to instill pride in Howard students.

The Hilltop remained on the forefront of social issues ranging from the need for a campus bookstore to the Vietnam War.

During the second semester of the 1990–1991 school year, under the direction of Editor-in-Chief Kevin Chappell, The Hilltop began publishing twice a week, although it would return to once a week the following school year. In 2002, the paper added a second section and introduced The Hilltop online. In 2005, The Hilltop becomes the first HBCU newspaper to be published daily.

== Timeline ==
This timeline is not fully inclusive

- 1924 – Louis Eugene King and Zora Neale Hurston begin The Hilltop on January 22, with the name deriving from the University Alma Mater.
- 1983 – Janice McKnight, The Hilltop editor in chief, is expelled from Howard University after running a controversial series of articles accusing the university of sexual discrimination. Student stage a protest in McKnight's honor, seizing the Administration building.
- 1986 – Editor in Chief Carol Winn fires 14 staff members, leaving her with a staff of only nine.
- 1989 – Protests over the appointment of Harvey Leroy "Lee" Atwater to the university's board of trustees leads to a shut down of the university and makes international news because Atwater, American Republican political consultant and strategist, used racially divisive propaganda to help George H. W. Bush win the 1988 presidential election. Atwater resigns from his position on the board in a letter to the editor in The Hilltop.
- 1991 – Under the direction of Editor in Chief Kevin Chappell, The Hilltop, which had become synonymous with Fridays, becomes the first HBCU newspaper to publish twice a week. (Although it would return to once a week the following school year.)
- 1991 – The Hilltop office moves to the West Towers dormitory after The Hilltop rowhouse is demolished to make way for the new Bethune Annex dormitory.
- 1993 – The Hilltop again publishes twice-weekly for a brief stint.
- 1994 – Isabel Wilkerson, The Hilltop editor in chief for the 1981-82 school year, wins the Pulitzer Prize while working at The New York Times.
- 1995 – The Hilltop is named the Best Collegiate Newspaper in the nation by the Princeton Review.
- 1996 – The Hilltop runs a controversial editorial and cartoon after a campus visit from the Nation of Islam's Khalid Muhammad. Editor in Chief Monica Lewis appears on ABC's Nightline and the Montel Williams Show over the course of the year.
- 1996 – The Hilltop names Karintha Styles the first female sports editor in school history.
- 1997 – The New York Times selects The Hilltop as one of its featured college papers, and re-runs an excerpt of a Hilltop editorial of the Million Woman March.
- 2002 – Under the direction of Editor in Chief Lauren Bayne Anderson, The Hilltop is redesigned and a website is launched.
- 2004 – The Hilltop is again named the Best Collegiate Newspaper in the nation by the Princeton Review.
- 2005 – The Hilltop becomes the first HBCU newspaper to be published daily.
- 2008 – The Hilltop temporarily ceased printing publications between March and the Fall, due to rising printing costs and falling advertising revenue.
- 2021 – The Hilltop covers the historic Blackburn Takeover, the longest protest in University history under the leadership of Ashleigh Fields as Editor-in-Chief.
- 2024 – The Hilltop celebrates 100 years as the student voice of Howard University.
