= Karintha Styles =

Journalist

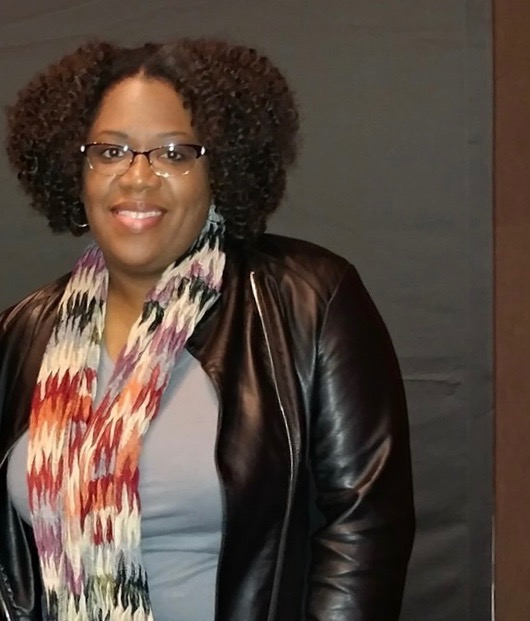
- Styles NCAA Final Four January 4, 2017 Dallas, TX
- Born: Karintha Wheaton; September 9, 1979 (age 47); Detroit, Michigan, United States
- Other name: Reign of Styles
- Education: Howard University
- Occupation: Journalist
- Years active: 2005–present
- Employer: iHeartMedia
- Known for: Working at iHeartMedia as a journalist.
- Website: karintha.com

Karintha Styles (September 9, 1979) is a sports journalist and author.

== Early life ==
Styles was born on September 9, 1979, in Detroit, Michigan. She has a degree in journalism from Howard University in Washington, D.C., and a Master's in Public Relations from Full Sail University in Winter Park, FL.

== Career ==
Styles began her career at Howard University as the second female sports editor of the student-run newspaper, The Hilltop, in 1998. Upon graduating, she worked with the Washington Wizards briefly before enlisting in the United States Army where she worked as a broadcast journalist, appearing regularly on the Armed Forces Network.

After leaving the service, Styles returned to sports journalism. While at the daily newspaper, The Oklahoman, she covered college basketball. From 2010 to 2014, Styles covered the NFL and NBA for the Times-Picayune. In the course of her career, Styles has covered college sports, Major League Baseball, the National Football League, the National Basketball Association, the Super Bowl, three Final Fours, and five NBA Finals.

== Personal life ==
Styles currently lives in New Orleans, Louisiana. She wrote a book of poems titled A Stroke of Life.
