= Howard University =

Private historically black university in Washington, D.C., US

- Motto: Veritas et Utilitas
- Motto in English: "Truth and Service"
- Type: Private federally chartered historically black research university
- Established: March 2, 1867; 159 years ago
- Accreditation: MSCHE
- Academic affiliations: CUWMA; NAICU; ORAU; TMCF; UARC
- Endowment: $1.12 billion (2025)
- President: Wayne A. I. Frederick (interim)
- Provost: Anthony Wutoh
- Students: 12,941 (spring 2024)
- Undergraduates: 9,797 (spring 2024)
- Postgraduates: 1,795 (spring 2024)
- Location: Washington, D.C., United States; 38°55′20″N 77°01′10″W
- Campus: Large city, 300 acres (1.2 km^{2})
- Newspaper: The Hilltop
- Colors: Blue; Red; Gray
- Nickname: Howard Bison and Lady Bison
- Sporting affiliations: NCAA Division I FCS – MEAC; NEC
- Mascot: Bison
- Website: howard.edu

Howard University is a private, historically black, federally chartered research university in Washington, D.C., United States. Established in 1867, Howard is a nonsectarian institution located in the Shaw neighborhood.

The university offers undergraduate, graduate, and professional degrees in more than 120 programs and is classified among "R1: Doctoral Universities – Very high research activity". It is the only HBCU with R1 designation. Howard is accredited by the Middle States Commission on Higher Education.

== History ==
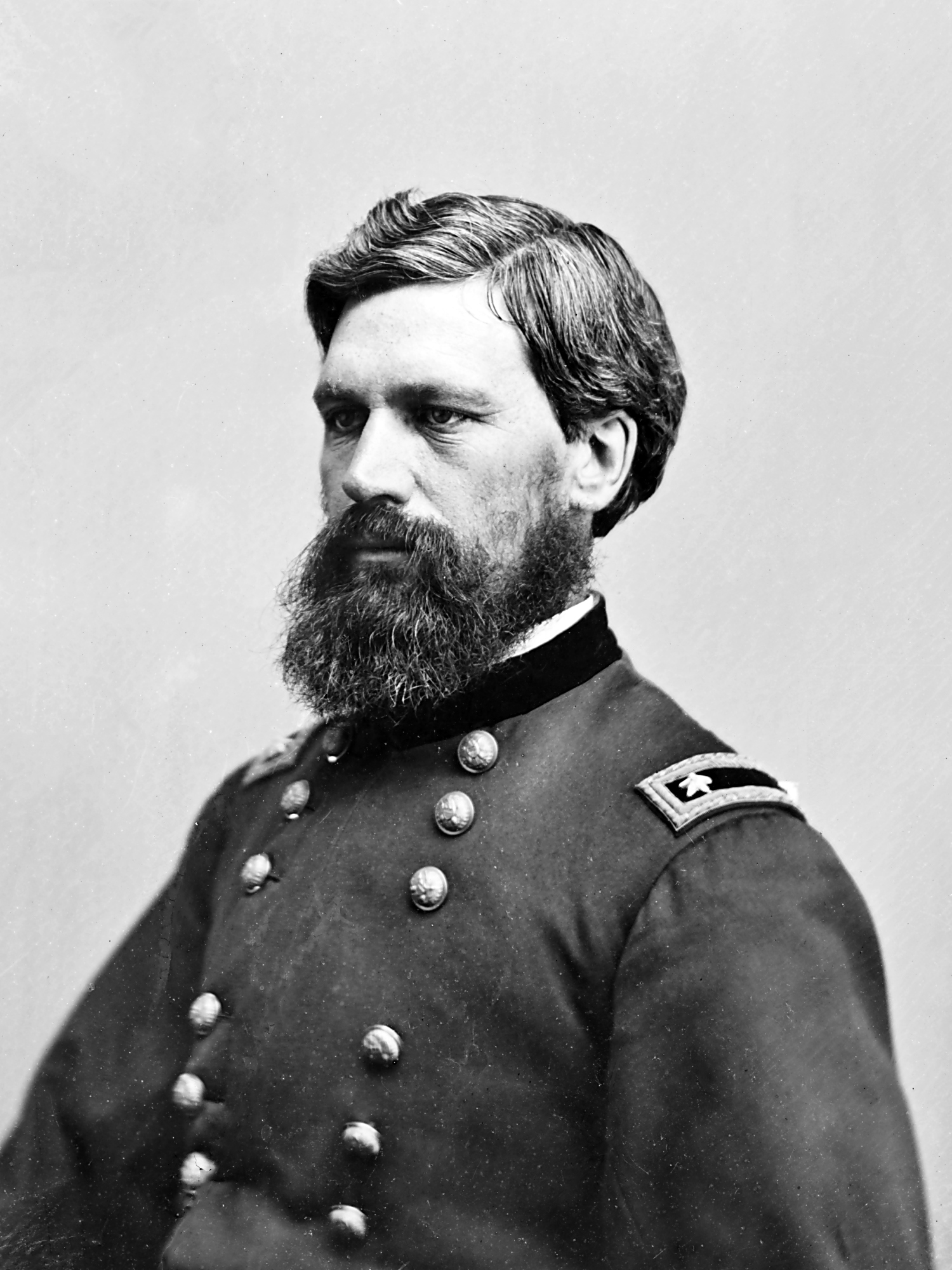
University namesake and founder Oliver Otis Howard

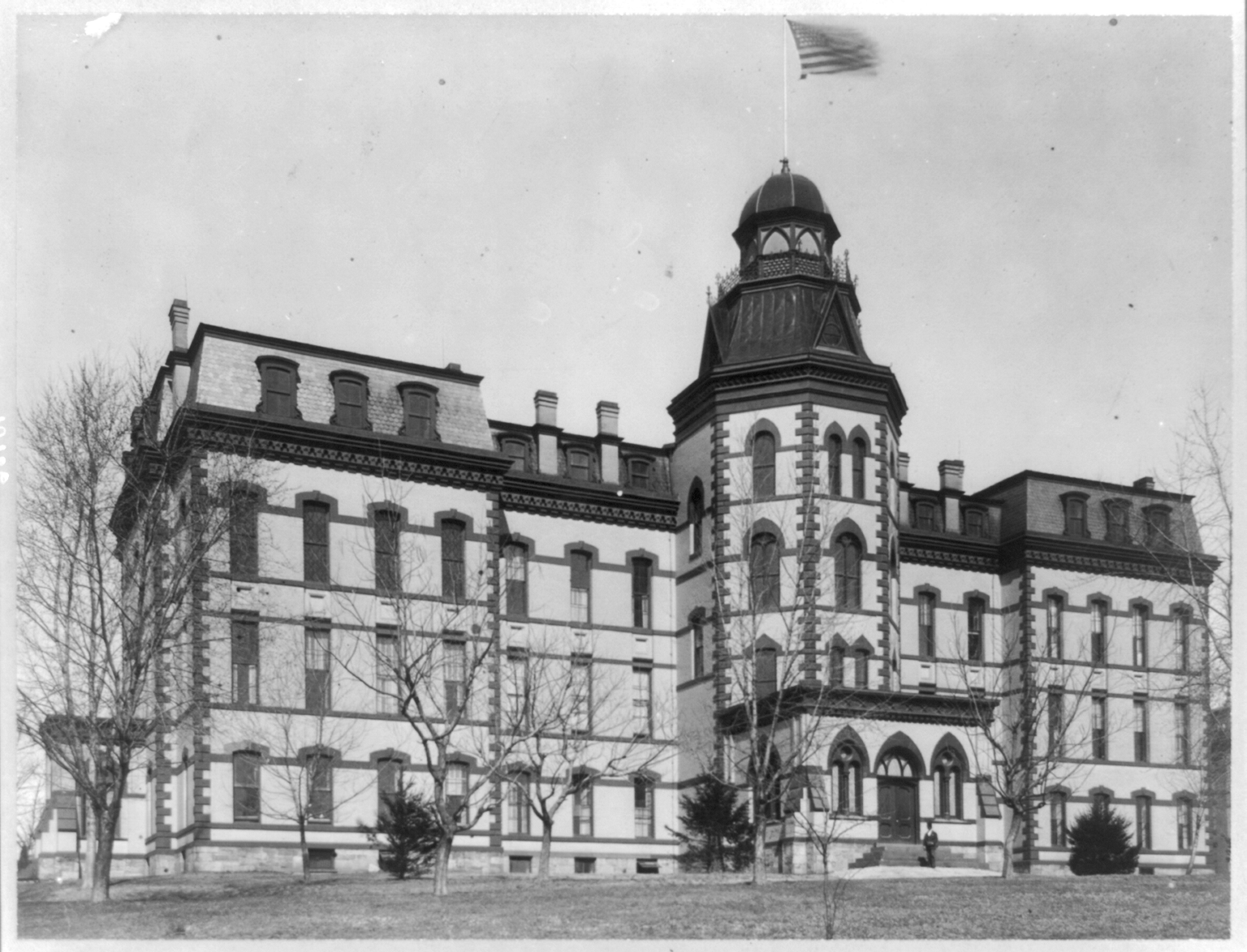
Howard Main, c. 1900

=== 19th century ===
Shortly after the end of the American Civil War, members of the First Congregational Society of Washington considered establishing a theological seminary for the education of black clergymen. Within a few weeks, the project expanded to include a provision for establishing a university. Within two years, the university consisted of the colleges of liberal arts and medicine. The new institution was named for General Oliver Otis Howard, a Civil War hero who was both the founder of the university and, at the time, commissioner of the Freedmen's Bureau. Howard later served as president of the university from 1869 to 1874.

The U.S. Congress chartered Howard on March 2, 1867, and much of its early funding came from endowment, private benefaction and tuition. (In the 20th and 21st centuries, an annual congressional appropriation, administered by the U.S. Department of Education, funds Howard University and Howard University Hospital.)

Many improvements were made on campus. Howard Hall was renovated and made a dormitory for women.

=== 20th century ===
From 1926 to 1960, preacher Mordecai Wyatt Johnson was Howard University's first African-American president.

The Great Depression years of the 1930s brought hardship to campus. Despite appeals from Eleanor Roosevelt, Howard saw its budget cut below Hoover administration levels during the presidency of Franklin D. Roosevelt.

In the 1930s, Howard University still had segregated student housing.

Miner Hall

Howard University played an important role in the Civil Rights Movement on a number of occasions. Alain Locke, chair of the Department of Philosophy and first African American Rhodes Scholar, authored The New Negro (1925), which helped to usher in the Harlem Renaissance. Ralph Bunche, the first Nobel Peace Prize winner of African descent, served as chair of the Department of Political Science. Beginning in 1942, Howard University students pioneered the "stool-sitting" technique of occupying stools at a local cafeteria which denied service to African Americans, blocking other customers waiting for service. This tactic was to play a prominent role in the later Civil Rights Movement. By January 1943, students had begun to organize regular sit-ins and pickets around Washington, D.C. at cigar stores and cafeterias which refused to serve them because of their race. These protests continued until the fall of 1944.

Stokely Carmichael, also known as Kwame Ture, a student in the Department of Philosophy and the Howard University School of Divinity, coined the term "Black Power" and worked in Lowndes County, Alabama as a voting rights activist. Historian Rayford Logan served as chair of the Department of History. E. Franklin Frazier served as chair of the Department of Sociology. Sterling Allen Brown served as chair of the Department of English.

Presidents of Howard University
1867	Charles B. Boynton
1867–1869	Byron Sunderland
1869–1874	Oliver Otis Howard
1875–1876	Edward P. Smith
1877–1889	William W. Patton
1890–1903	Jeremiah Rankin
1903–1906	John Gordon
1906–1912	Wilbur P. Thirkield
1912–1918	Stephen M. Newman
1918–1926	J. Stanley Durkee
1926–1960	Mordecai Wyatt Johnson
1960–1969	James Nabrit Jr.
1969–1989	James E. Cheek
1990–1994	Franklyn Jenifer
1995–2008	H. Patrick Swygert
2008–2013	Sidney A. Ribeau
2013–2023	Wayne A. I. Frederick
2023–2025	Ben Vinson III
2025–Present	Wayne A. I. Frederick (interim)

The first sitting president to speak at Howard was Calvin Coolidge in 1924. His graduation speech was entitled, "The Progress of a People", and highlighted the accomplishments to date of African-Americans since the Civil War. His concluding thought was, "We can not go out from this place and occasion without refreshment of faith and renewal of confidence that in every exigency our Negro fellow citizens will render the best and fullest measure of service whereof they are capable."

In 1965, President Lyndon B. Johnson delivered a speech to the graduating class at Howard, where he outlined his plans for civil rights legislation and endorsed aggressive affirmative action to combat the effects of years of segregation of blacks from the nation's economic opportunities. At the time, the voting rights bill was still pending in the House of Representatives.

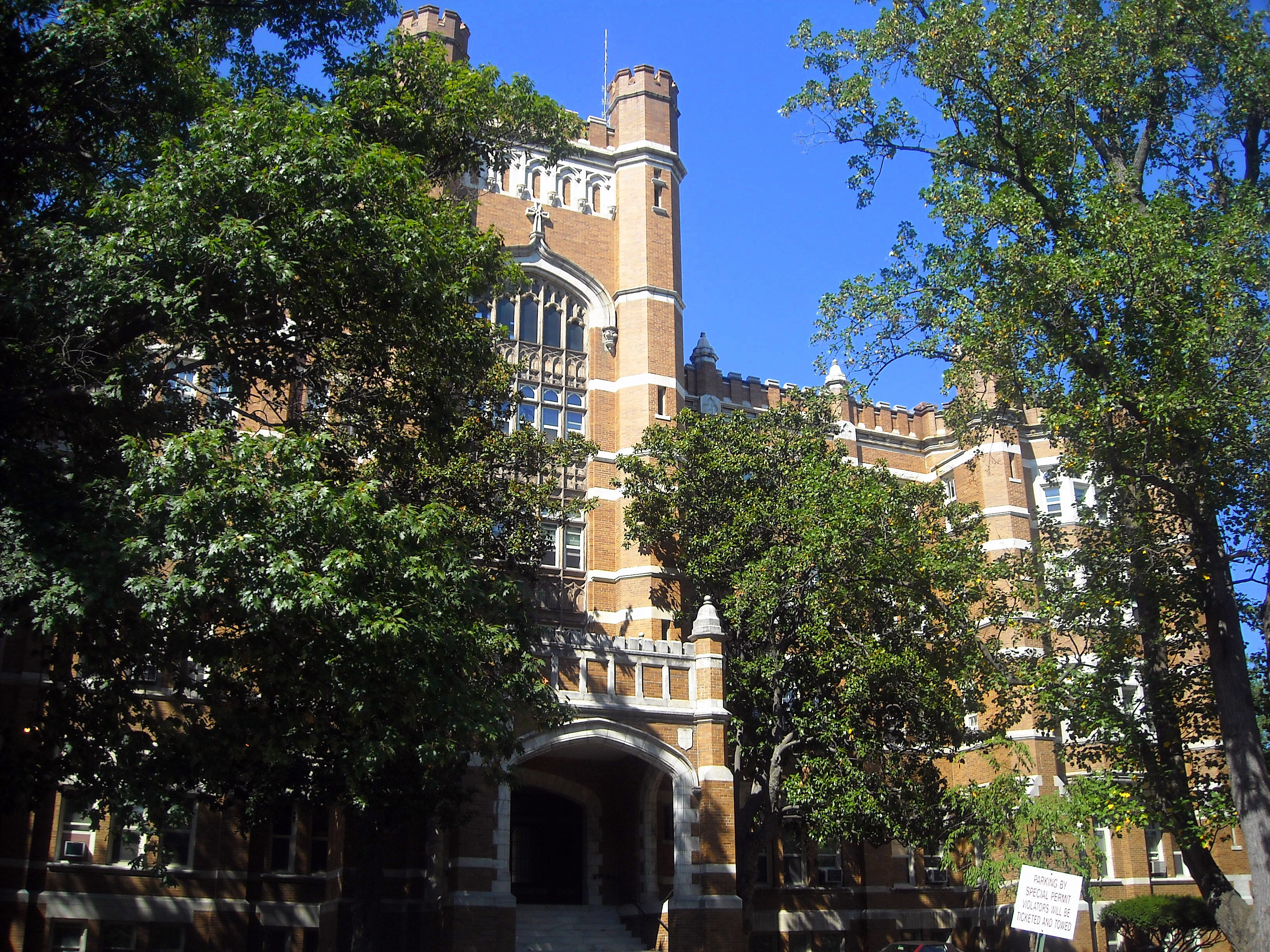
Howard University School of Law is one of the oldest law schools in the United States.

In 1975, the historic Freedman's Hospital closed after 112 years of use as Howard University College of Medicine's primary teaching hospital. Howard University Hospital opened that same year and continues to be used as HUCM's primary teaching hospital, with service to the surrounding community. That same year, Jeanne Sinkford became the first female dean of any American dental school when she was appointed as the dean of Howard University's school of dentistry.

In 1989, Howard gained national attention when students rose up in protest against the appointment of then-Republican National Committee Chairman Lee Atwater as a new member of the university's board of trustees. Student activists disrupted Howard's 122nd-anniversary celebrations, and eventually occupied the university's administration building. Within days, both Atwater and Howard's president, James E. Cheek, resigned.

=== 21st century ===
In April 2007, the head of the faculty senate called for the ouster of Howard University President H. Patrick Swygert, saying the school was in a state of crisis, and it was time to end "an intolerable condition of incompetence and dysfunction at the highest level." This came on the heels of several criticisms of Howard University and its management. The following month, Swygert announced he would retire in June 2008. The university announced in May 2008 that Sidney Ribeau of Bowling Green State University would succeed Swygert as president. Ribeau appointed a Presidential Commission on Academic Renewal to conduct a year-long self-evaluation that resulted in reducing or closing 20 out of 171 academic programs. For example, they proposed closing the undergraduate philosophy major and African studies major.

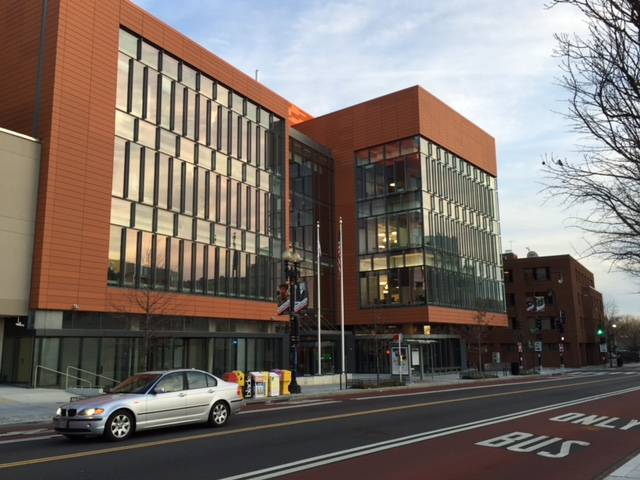
Interdisciplinary Research Building

Six years later, in 2013, university insiders again alleged the university was in crisis. In April, the vice chairwoman of the university's board of trustees wrote a letter to her colleagues harshly criticizing the university's president and calling for a vote of no confidence; her letter was subsequently obtained by the media where it drew national headline. Two months later, the university's Council of Deans alleged "fiscal mismanagement is doing irreparable harm," blaming the university's senior vice president for administration, chief financial officer and treasurer and asking for his dismissal. In October, the faculty voted no confidence in the university's board of trustees executive committee, two weeks after university president Sidney A. Ribeau announced he would retire at the end of the year. On October 1, the board of trustees named Wayne A. I. Frederick interim president. In July 2014, the trustees named Frederick the university's 17th president.

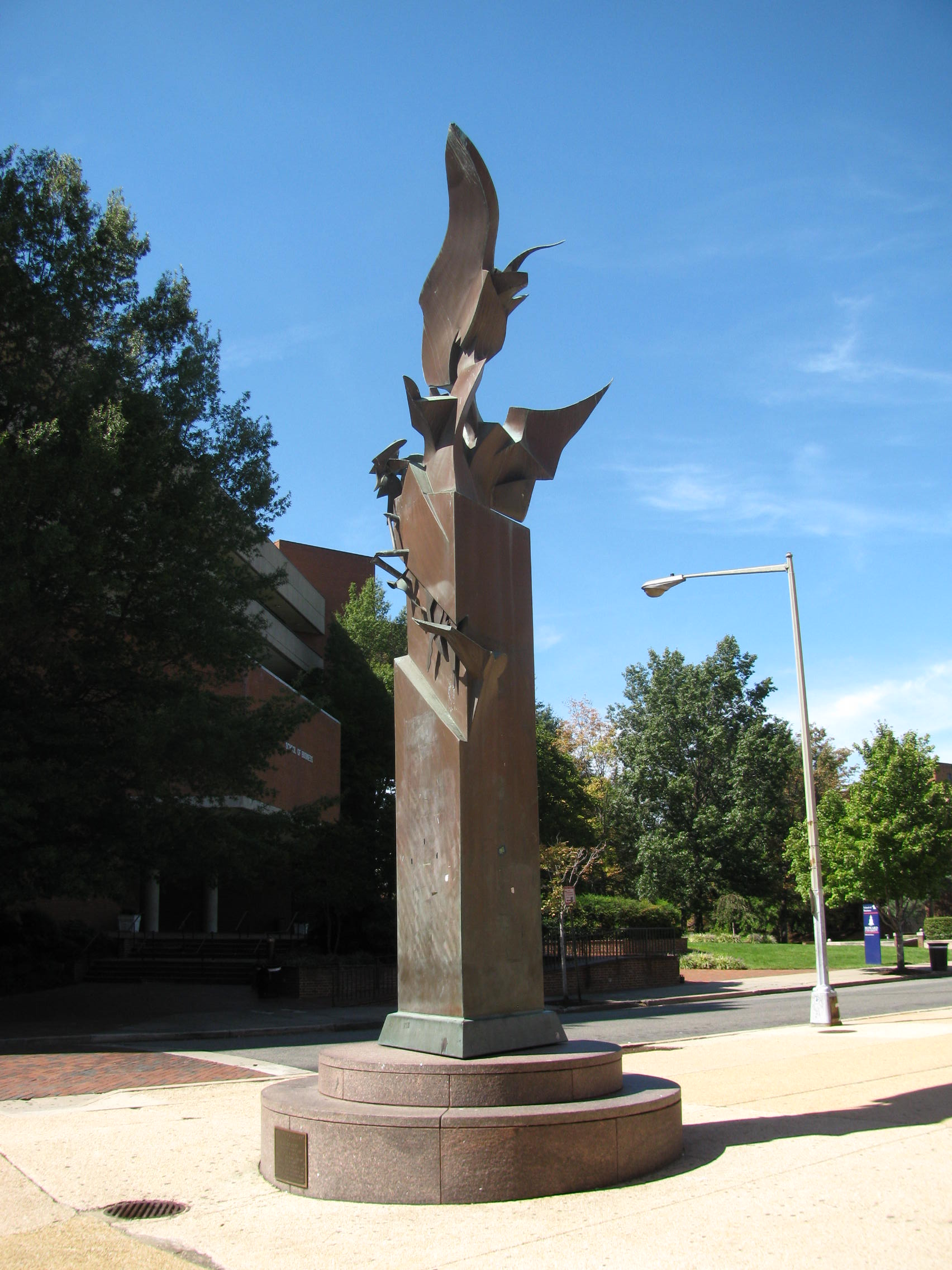
The Freedman's Column

In May 2016, President Barack Obama delivered a commencement address at Howard University encouraging the graduates to become advocates for racial change and to prepare for future challenges.

In 2018, nearly 1,000 students held a sit-in demanding injunction over the administration's use of funding, after a Medium post revealed that six university employees had been fired for "double dipping" financial aid and tuition remission. The university had discovered the fraud the previous year, but had not publicly disclosed the loss; 131 individuals were involved in some form, with the top 50 recipients accounting for 90% of the total, and the five most reimbursed individuals receiving $689,375 in refunds. After the student protest ended, faculty voted "no confidence" in the university president, chief operating officer, provost, and board of trustees. The nine-day protest ended with university officials promising to meet most of their demands. It also led to an investigation by the Department of Education, which placed the university on heightened cash monitoring, an increased form of scrutiny relating to the disbursement of student financial aid. This monitoring status was rescinded in December of the following year.

In May 2021, the university announced that the newly re-established college of fine arts, led by Dean Phylicia Rashad, would be named the Chadwick A. Boseman College of Fine Arts for the actor and distinguished alum who from his days as a student in the late 1990s through his death from cancer in 2020 led protests against the 1997 absorption of the College of Fine Arts into the College of Arts & Sciences.

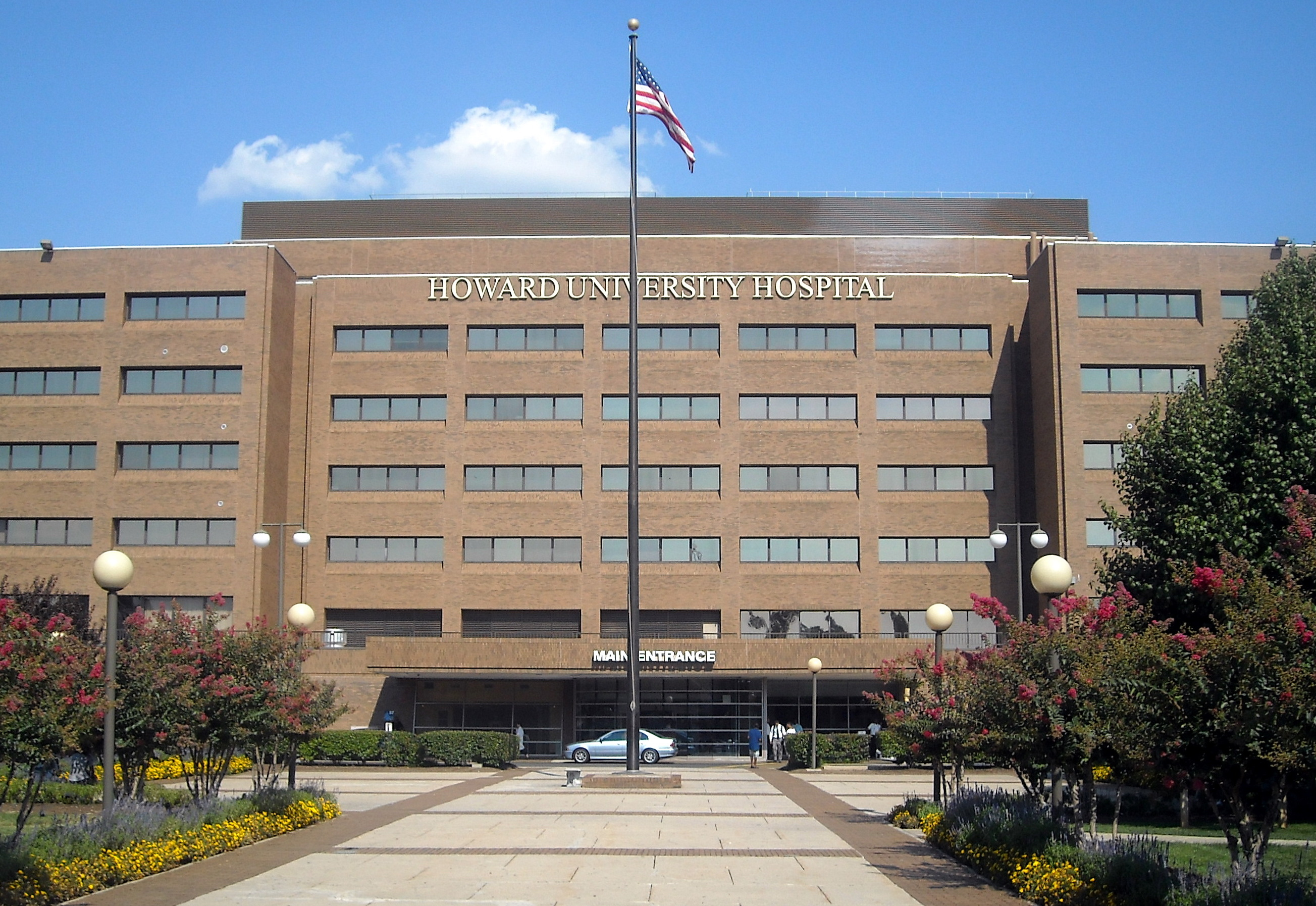
Howard University Hospital

In October 2021, a group of students protested the mold, mice, and substandard conditions in campus residential buildings in the Blackburn Takeover, demanding an improvement in the living situation and representation on the board of trustees. In 2023, Howard University issued a $300 million tax-exempt bond to tackle the housing woes, as part of a $785 million investment to renovate and construct academic centers.

In March 2022, Howard University announced that it will spend $785 million over the next four years to construct new STEM complex, academic buildings to house the Chadwick Boseman School of Fine Arts, and the Cathy Hughes School of Communications, as well as renovate other buildings on campus.

In 2023, Howard University was selected by the Department of the Air Force to lead a research center on tactical autonomy technology for military systems.

In February 2025, Howard University became the first HBCU to achieve Research One (R1) Carnegie Classification. In November 2025, MacKenzie Scott donated an $80 million gift to Howard—one of the largest donations in the school's history. Scott's gift included $17 million for the Howard University College of Medicine, the first and oldest medical college at an HBCU. In recent years, Scott has donated $132 million to Howard, including $40 million in 2020, and $12 million in 2023.

== Campus ==
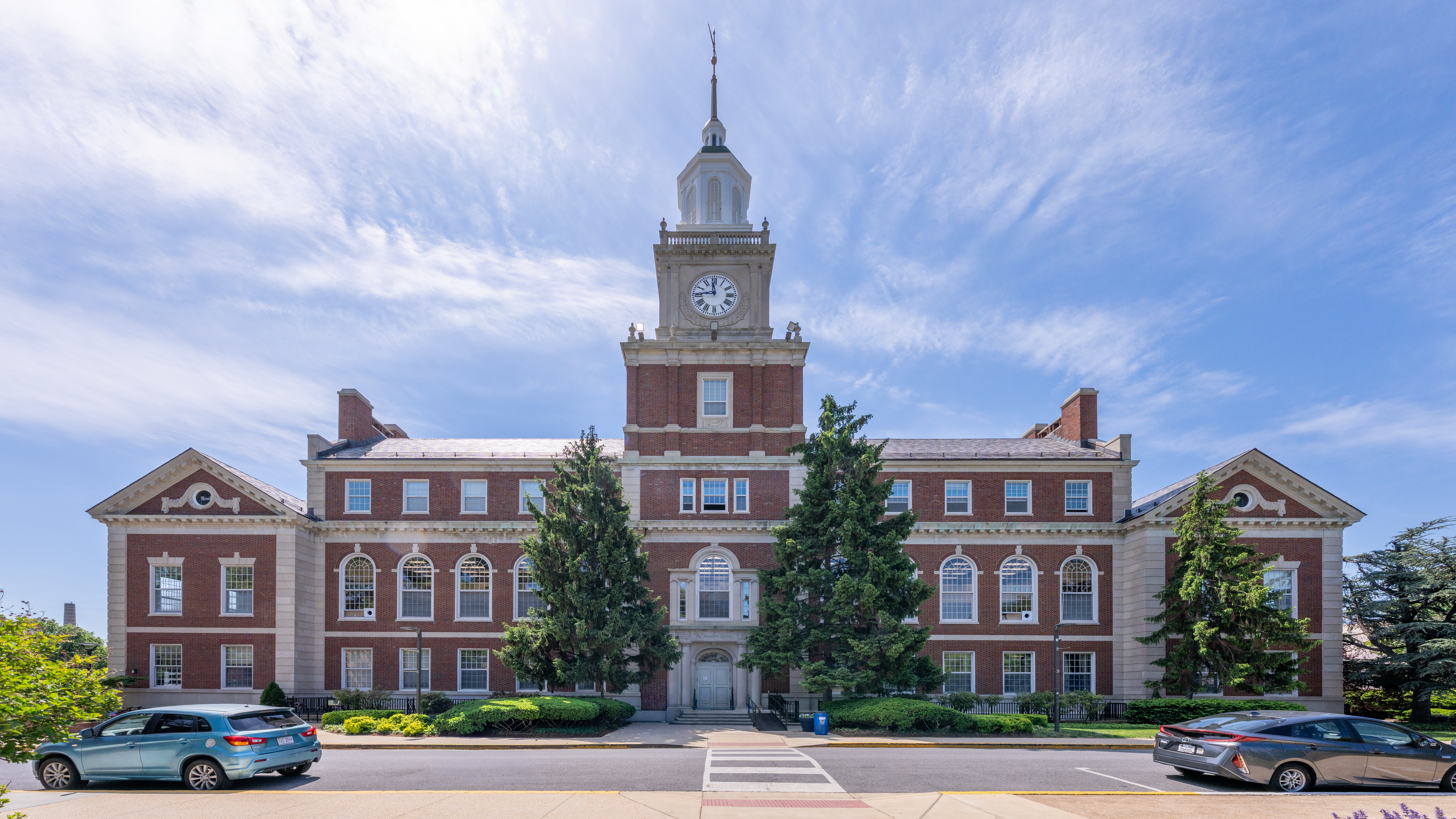
Founders Library is an iconic building on the Howard University campus that has been declared a National Historic Landmark.

The 256-acre (1.04 km^{2}; 0.400 sq mi) campus, often referred to as "The Mecca", is in northwest Washington, D. C.

Major improvements, additions and changes occurred at the school in the aftermath of World War I. New buildings were built under the direction of architect Albert Cassell.

Howard University has several historic landmarks on campus, such as Andrew Rankin Memorial Chapel, Frederick Douglass Memorial Hall, and the Founders Library.

The Howard University Gallery of Art was established by Howard's board of trustees in 1928. The gallery's permanent collection has grown to over 4,000 works of art and continues to serve as an academic resource for the Howard community.

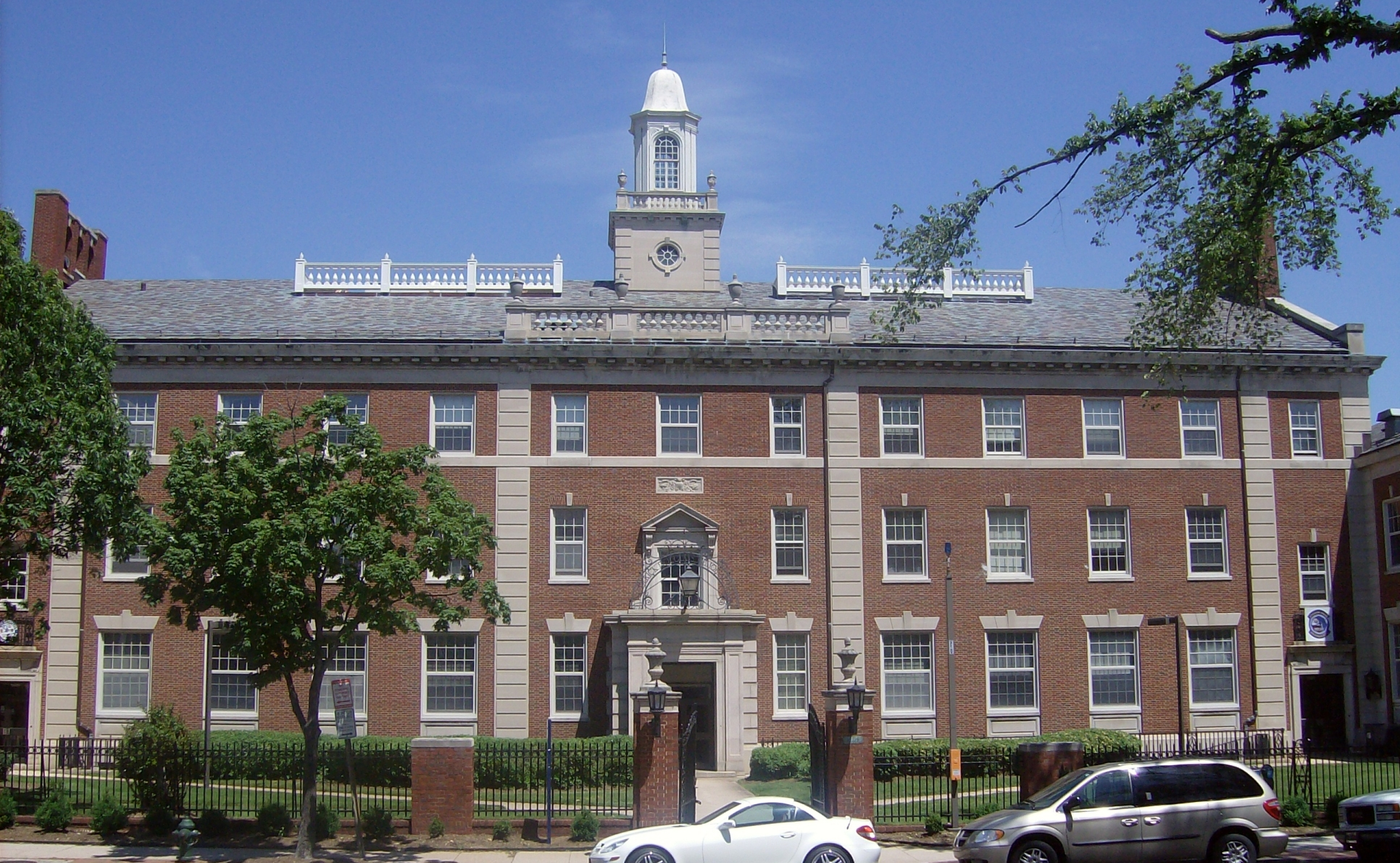
Frederick Douglas Memorial Hall

Howard University has eight residence halls for students: Drew Hall (freshmen), College Hall North (freshwomen), The Harriet Tubman Quadrangle - "Quad" (freshwomen), Cook Hall (freshmen), Bethune Annex (co-ed, continuing students), Plaza Towers West (co-ed, continuing students), College Hall South (co-ed, continuing students), The Axis (co-ed, continuing students), Mazza Grandmarc (co-ed, continuing students), WISH-Woodley Park (co-ed, continuing students) and Plaza Towers East (co-ed, continuing students).

Howard University Hospital, opened in 1975 on the eastern end of campus, was built on the site of Griffith Stadium, in use from the 1890s to 1965 as home of the first, second and third incarnations of the MLB Senators, as well as the NFL's Washington Redskins, several college football teams (including Georgetown, GWU and Maryland) and part-time home of the Homestead Grays of the Negro National League.

Howard University is home to the commercial radio station WHUR-FM 96.3, also known as Howard University Radio. A student-run station, WHBC, operates on an HD Radio sub-channel of WHUR-FM. HUR Voices can be heard on SiriusXM Satellite Radio. Howard is also home to the public television station WHUT-TV, located on campus next to WHUR-FM. WHUR-FM became the birthplace of the quiet storm late-night radio format via its student intern Melvin Lindsey in 1976, named after a Smokey Robinson song and album, titled "Quiet Storm" and A Quiet Storm, respectively.

== Organization ==
The university is led by a board of trustees that includes a faculty trustee from the undergraduate colleges, a faculty trustee from the graduate and professional colleges serving three-year terms, two student trustees, each serving one-year terms, and three alumni-elected trustees, each serving three-year terms.

== Academics ==
Academic rankings

National
- Forbes: 273
- U.S. News & World Report: 86
- Washington Monthly: 141
- WSJ/College Pulse: 127

Global
- ARWU: 901–1000
- QS: 581–590
- THE: 201–250
- U.S. News & World Report: 1005

=== Schools and colleges ===
- Howard University College of Engineering and Architecture
- Howard University College of Nursing & Allied Health Sciences
- Howard University College of Pharmacy
- Howard University College of Arts and Sciences
- Howard University Chadwick Boseman College of Fine Arts
- Howard University College of Dentistry
- Howard University School of Business
- Howard University Cathy Hughes School of Communications
- Howard University College of Medicine
- Howard University School of Law
- Howard University Middle School of Mathematics and Science
- Howard University School of Divinity
- Howard University School of Education
- Howard University School of Social Work

=== Faculty ===
Howard faculty include member of Congress from Maryland Roscoe Bartlett, blood banking pioneer Charles Drew, Emmy-winning actor Al Freeman Jr., suffragist Elizabeth Piper Ensley, civil rights lawyer Charles Hamilton Houston, media entrepreneur Cathy Hughes, marine biologist Ernest Everett Just, professor of surgery LaSalle D. Leffall Jr., sociology professor Anaheed Al-Hardan, journalists Nikole Hannah-Jones and Ta-Nehisi Coates, political consultant Ron Walters, political activist Stacey Abrams, novelist and diplomat E. R. Braithwaite, filmmaker Haile Gerima, and psychiatrist Frances Cress Welsing.

=== Honors programs ===
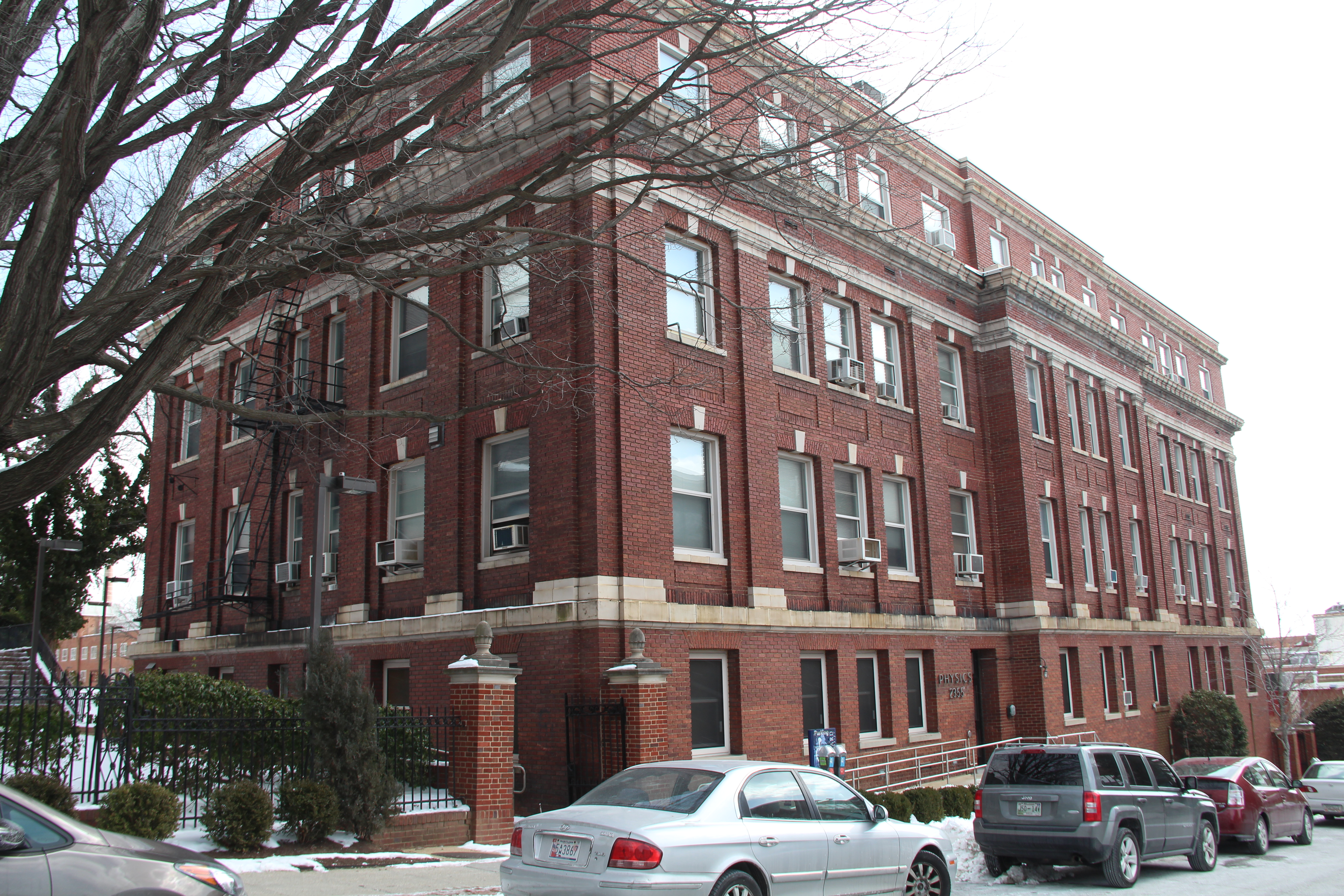
Howard physics building

Howard offers four selective honors programs for its most high-achieving undergraduate students: the College of Arts & Sciences Honors Program, the School of Education Honors Program, the Executive Leadership Honors Program in the School of Business, and the Annenberg Honors Program in the School of Communications.

=== Collaboration with New York Institute of Technology (NYIT) ===
The New York Institute of Technology (NYIT) and Howard University have an accelerated seven-year Chemistry, B.S. (Pharmaceutical Sciences)-Pharm. D. program, which allows New York Tech students to receive both a Bachelor of Science from NYIT and a Doctor of Pharmacy (Pharm. D.) from Howard.

=== Martha and Bruce Karsh STEM Scholars Program ===
In 2017, Howard established the Bison STEM Scholars Program to increase the number of underrepresented minorities with high-level research careers in science, engineering, technology, and mathematics. Bison STEM Scholars are given full scholarships and committed to earning a PhD or a combined MD–PhD in a STEM discipline. The highly competitive program annually accepts approximately 30 undergraduate students for each new cohort. As of 2020, the Bison STEM Scholars Program was renamed the Martha and Bruce Karsh Stem Scholars Program (KSSP) following the $10 million (~$12.2 million in 2025) donation from the family's foundation.

=== Google's Tech Exchange ===
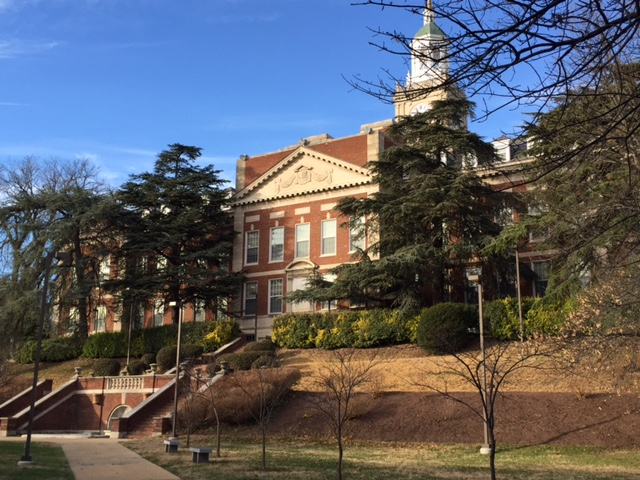
The Lower Quadrangle, also known as "The Valley"

In 2017, Google Inc. announced it had established a pilot residency program named "Howard University West" on its campus in Mountain View, California, to help increase underrepresented minorities in the tech industry. In 2018, the program expanded from a three-month summer program to a full academic year program and the name changed to "Tech Exchange" to be inclusive of 15 other minority-serving institutions added to the program such as Florida A&M, Prairie View A&M, and Fisk. Howard students in the program learn from senior Google engineers, practice the latest coding techniques, and experience tech culture in Mountain View for course credits towards their degrees.

=== Disney Storyteller Fund ===
In July 2022, the Walt Disney Company announced it had established the Disney Storytellers Fund at the Cathy Hughes School of Communications and the Chadwick A. Boseman College of Fine Arts to support creative student projects. The fund provides undergraduate students with stipends up to $60,000 and mentorship intended to help cultivate a new generation of Black storytellers. In October 2022, the fund expanded to other HBCU campuses.

=== Research ===
General Howard Hall

==== Interdisciplinary Research Building ====
Howard's most prominent research building is the Interdisciplinary Research Building (IRB). Opened in 2016, the multi-story, 81,670 square foot, state-of-the-art research facility was completed for $70 million (~$91.9 million in 2025). The IRB was designed to promote more collaborative and innovative research on campus.

==== Moorland-Spingarn Research Center ====
"The Moorland-Spingarn Research Center (MSRC) is recognized as one of the world's largest and most comprehensive repositories for the documentation of the history and culture of people of African descent in Africa, the Americas, and other parts of the world. The MSRC collects, preserves, and makes available for research a wide range of resources chronicling black experiences."

==== NASA University Research Center (BCCSO) ====
Howard University School of Divinity

The Beltsville Center for Climate System Observation (BCCSO) is a NASA University Research Center at the Beltsville, Maryland campus of Howard University. BCCSO consists of a multidisciplinary group of Howard faculty in partnership with NASA Goddard Space Flight Center Earth Sciences Division, other academic institutions, and government. This group is led by three Principal Investigators, Everette Joseph, also the director of BCCSO, Demetrius Venable and Belay Demoz. BCCSO trains science and academic leaders to understand atmospheric processes through atmospheric observing systems and analytical methods.

==== The Ralph J. Bunche International Affairs Center ====
Founded in 1993, The Ralph J. Bunche International Affairs Center's (RBC) mission is to serve as the hub and catalyst for enhancing international engagement for the benefit of the Howard University community. The RBC houses study abroad programs, foreign affairs scholarships and internships, and international affairs research. Most recently, the RBC launched the Global Futures Collaborative (GFC) as a policy engine for greater programming.

=== Publications ===
Howard University is home to The Hilltop, the university's student newspaper. Founded in 1924 by Zora Neale Hurston, The Hilltop enjoys a long legacy at the university.

Howard University is the publisher of The Journal of Negro Education, which began publication in 1932. The Howard University Bison Yearbook is created, edited and published during the school year to provide students a year-in-review. Howard University also publishes the Capstone, the official e-newsletter for the university; and the Howard Magazine, the official magazine for the university, which is published three times a year.

=== The Howard University Libraries ===
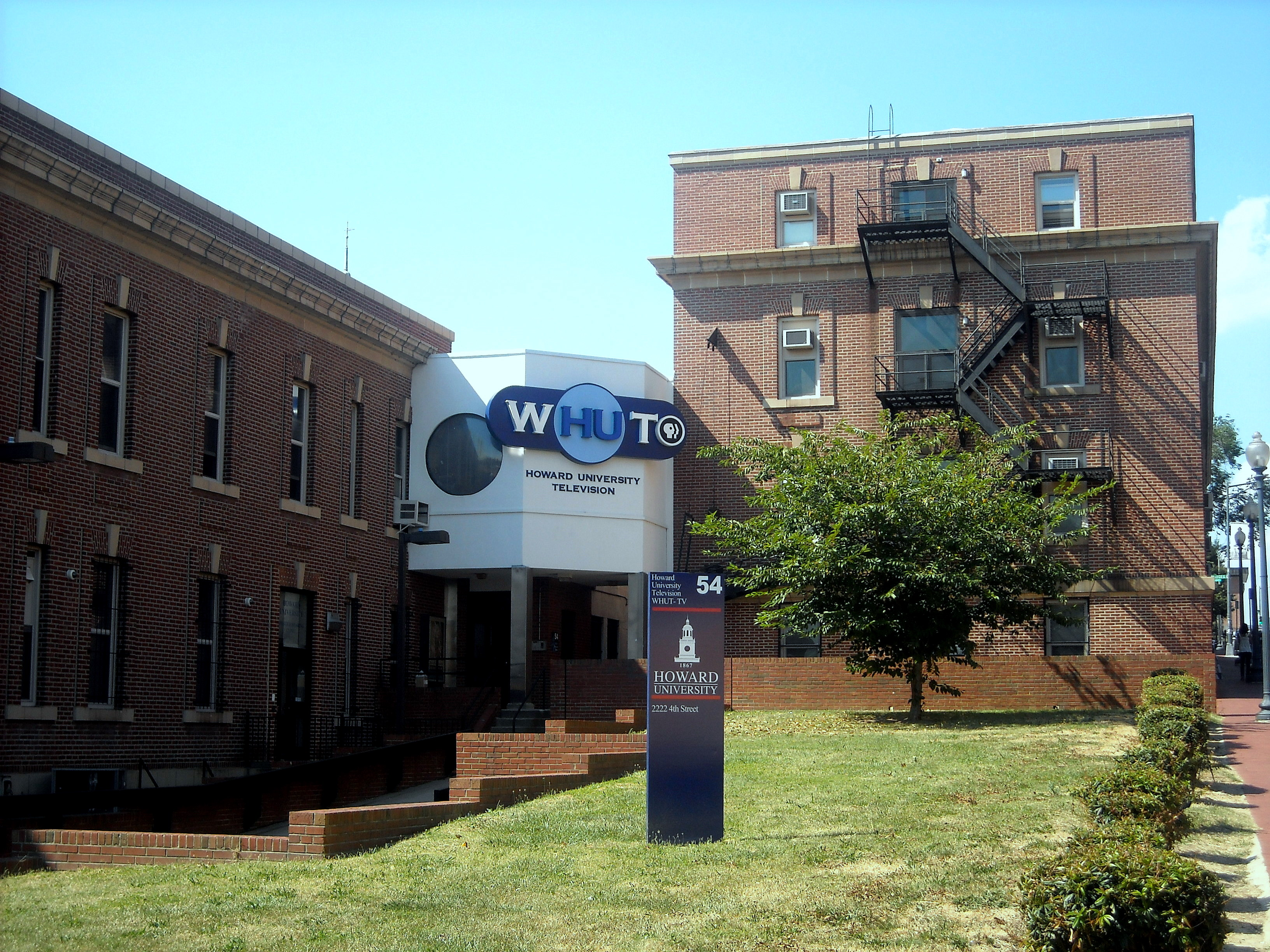
WHUT-TV station

On 2 December 1907, Andrew Carnegie granted Howard University $50,000 to establish its first library. Located in what today is the Carnegie Building, the Howard University library operated there until 1937.

Today, the Howard University Libraries (HUL) system comprises nine branches and centers

- The Founders Library - the main library, established in January 1939
- The School of Business Library
- The School of Divinity Library
- The School of Social Work Library
- The Moorland-Spingarn Research Center
- The Channing Pollock Theatre Collection
- The Patent and Trademark Resource Center
- The Undergraduate Library (UGL)
- The Afro-American Studies Center

== Student life ==
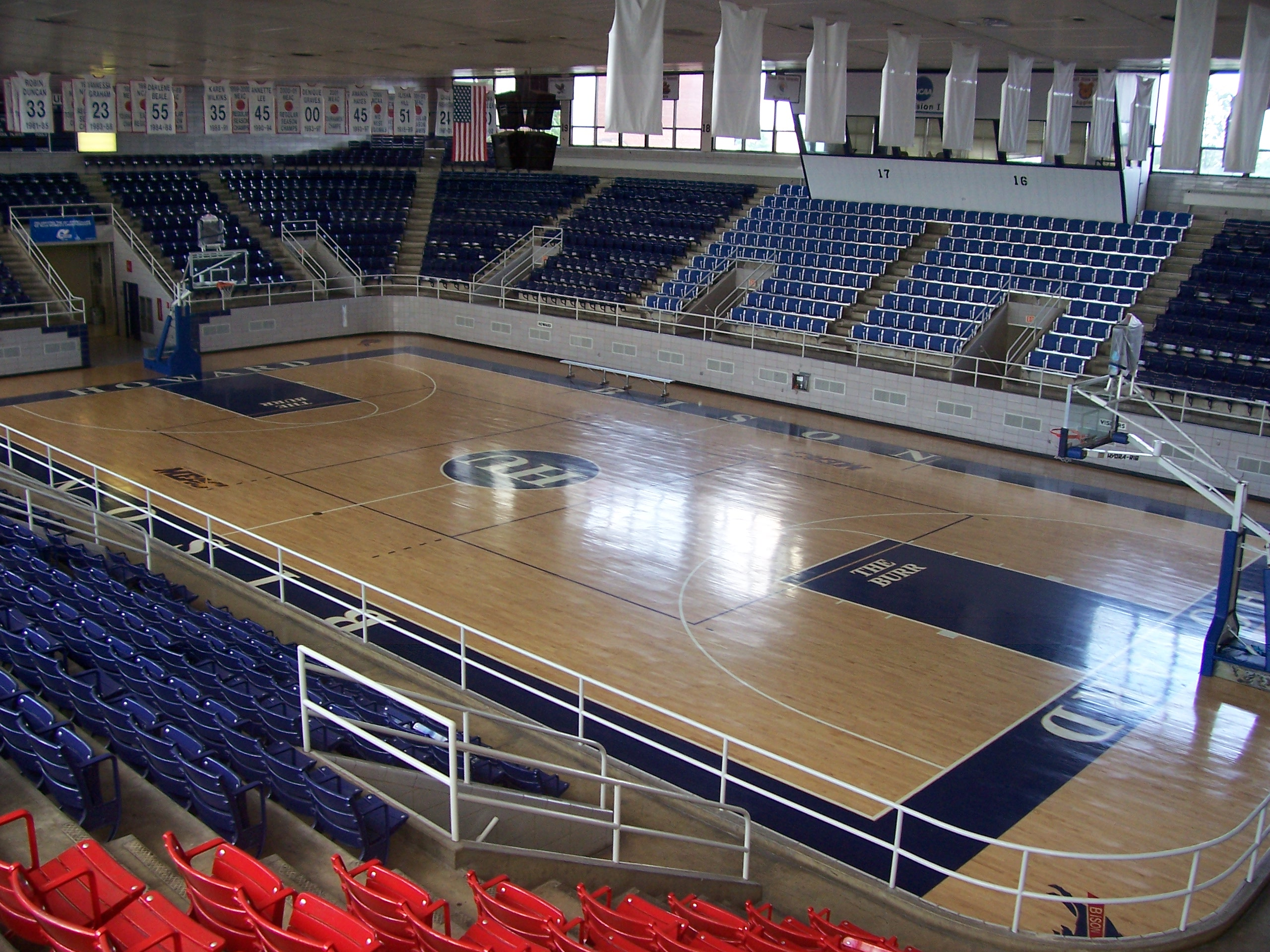
Burr Gymnasium (The Burr)

=== Athletics ===
Most of Howard's 21 NCAA Division I varsity teams compete in the Mid-Eastern Athletic Conference (MEAC).

In February 2024, the Howard University Ice Skating Club became the first HBCU organization to compete in an intercollegiate figure skating competition; that competition was the Blue Hen Ice Classic. The club competed in the Team Maneuvers – Low event, team skater Gabrielle Francis competed in the Pre-Preliminary Women Excel event, and club president Maya James competed in the Juvenile Women Short Program.

=== Students ===
Student body composition as of May 2, 2022
Race and ethnicity	Total
Black	69%
White	10%
Hispanic	6%
Foreign national	5%
Other (Note: Other consists of multiracial Americans & those who prefer to not say.)	5%
Asian	4%
Native American Indian	1%
Economic diversity
Low-income (Note: The percentage of students who received an income-based federal Pell grant intended for low-income students.)	41%
Affluent (Note: The percentage of students who are a part of the American middle class at the bare minimum.)	59%

Howard is one of the five largest HBCUs in the nation with around 10,000 students. The student-to-faculty ratio is 7:1.

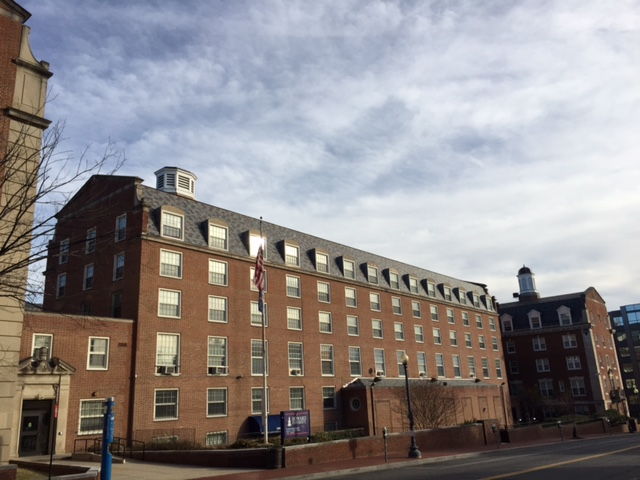
The Harriet Tubman Quadrangle – "The Quad" – consists of five halls housing approximately 640 freshmen (women only). The resident halls are Wheatley (after Phillis Wheatley), Baldwin, Frazier (Julia S. Caldwell-Frazier), Truth (Sojourner Truth), and Crandall (Prudence Crandall) Halls.

Howard is a selective institution. The incoming freshman class of fall 2021 had 29,391 applicants, and 10,362 (35%) were accepted into Howard. Approximately 25% of the student body is male, as of 2025.

There are over 200 student organizations and special interest groups established on campus.

Howard produced four Rhodes Scholars between 1986 and 2017. Between 1998 and 2009, Howard University produced a Marshall Scholar, two Truman Scholars, twenty-two Fulbright Scholars and ten Pickering Fellows.

In 2020, 82% of first-year students received need-based financial aid.

=== Greek letter organizations ===
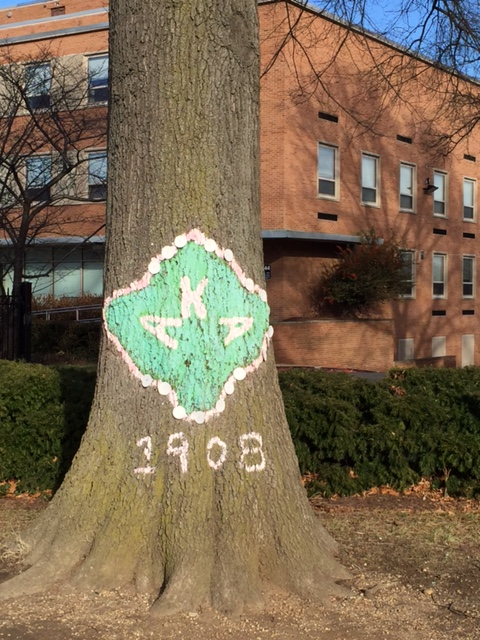
The Alpha Kappa Alpha Tree on Howard's main yard

Howard University has many academic and social Greek letter organizations on campus. Howard is the founding site of the National Pan-Hellenic Council (NPHC) and five of the nine NPHC organizations. Howard is one of four HBCUs with a chapter of Phi Beta Kappa, the oldest academic honor society in the U.S.

=== Events ===
==== Howard Homecoming ====
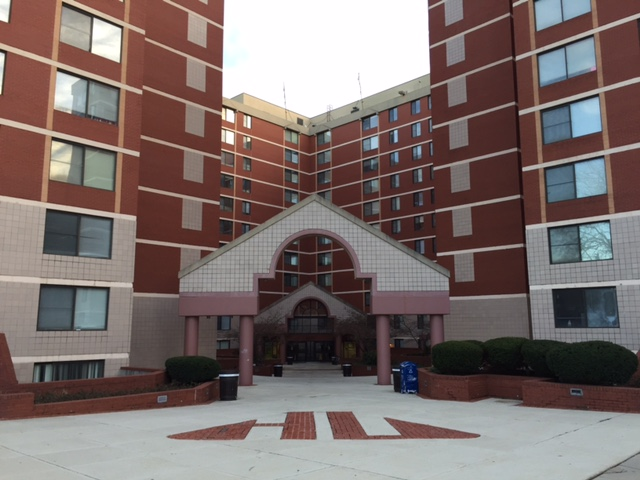
Howard University Towers East is one of the graduate student dormitories on campus.

Howard University’s Homecoming Week is one of the institution’s most prominent cultural traditions. bringing together alumni, students, celebrity guests, and visitors. The week attracts more than 100,000 attendees who participate in events and activities on and around campus. Although the schedule varies from year to year, traditional events include the Homecoming Football Game and Tailgate, Pep Rally, Coronation Ball, Greek Step-Show (Howard NPHC Greeks), and Fashion Show. Yardfest, another Homecoming tradition, returned in 2016 after a two-year hiatus, continuing its role in the week’s celebrations..

Howard's first official homecoming was held in 1924 and it takes place every fall semester with a new theme developed by the homecoming committee.

==== Springfest ====
Springfest is an annual tradition created by the Undergraduate Student Association (UGSA) to celebrate the arrival of spring. Springfest is similar to homecoming week in the fall but on a smaller scale and with more emphasis on the student body. Springfest events traditionally include the Fashion Show, Talent Show, Vendor Fair, Poetry Showcase, Beauty Conference, Charity Basketball Game, and a major community service event. The schedule of events changes slightly each year.

==== Bison Ball ====
The Bison Ball and Excellence Awards is an annual black tie gala hosted by the Howard University Student Association (HUSA). A select number of students, faculty, organizations, and administrators from the Howard community are honored for their exceptional accomplishments. This event takes place near the end of every spring semester.

==== Resfest ====
Resfest week is a Howard tradition that involves freshmen living in residence halls on campus competing in several organized competitions (field day, academic debate, dance, stroll, step-show, etc.) for campus bragging rights. This event takes place on campus near the end of every spring semester.

== Notable alumni ==
Distinguished alumni of Howard University include a vice president of the United States, several diplomats and governors, a U.S. ambassador to the United Nations, foreign royals, seven foreign heads of state, 11 members of U.S. Congress, a Supreme Court justice, directors and executives of Fortune 500 companies, Academy Award- and Emmy Award-winning actors, Grammy Award-winning songwriters and producers, two U.S. Army generals, a U.S. Air Force general and vice chief of staff of the Air Force, and Nobel laureates including Nobel Prize for Literature winner Toni Morrison. Additional alumni include civil rights activists and pioneers in the Civil Rights Movement, a secretary of Health and Human Services, a secretary of Housing and Urban Development, a secretary of agriculture, a secretary of Veterans Affairs, a secretary of the Army, a deputy secretary of commerce, 12 mayors, and three state attorneys general.

Howard University has also produced many firsts, including Roger Arliner Young, who became the first African-American woman to receive a doctorate in zoology; Benjamin O. Davis Sr., the first African-American U.S. Army general; Frederic E. Davison, the first African-American U.S. Army major general and the first to command an Army infantry division, Johnson O. Akinleye, 12th chancellor of North Carolina Central University; Thurgood Marshall, the first African-American Supreme Court justice; and Edward W. Brooke III, the first African-American elected to the U.S. Senate.

Howard University also counts four Rhodes Scholarship winners, 22 Pickering Fellows, 11 Truman Scholars, over 70 Fulbright Scholars, a Schwarzman Scholar, a Goldwater Scholar, and two Pulitzer Prize winners and numerous other Pulitzer Prize nominees among its alumni. To date, Howard University has granted over 120,000 degrees and produces the most black doctorate recipients of any university.

Notable Howard University alumni include:

Kamala Harris, 49th vice president of the United States

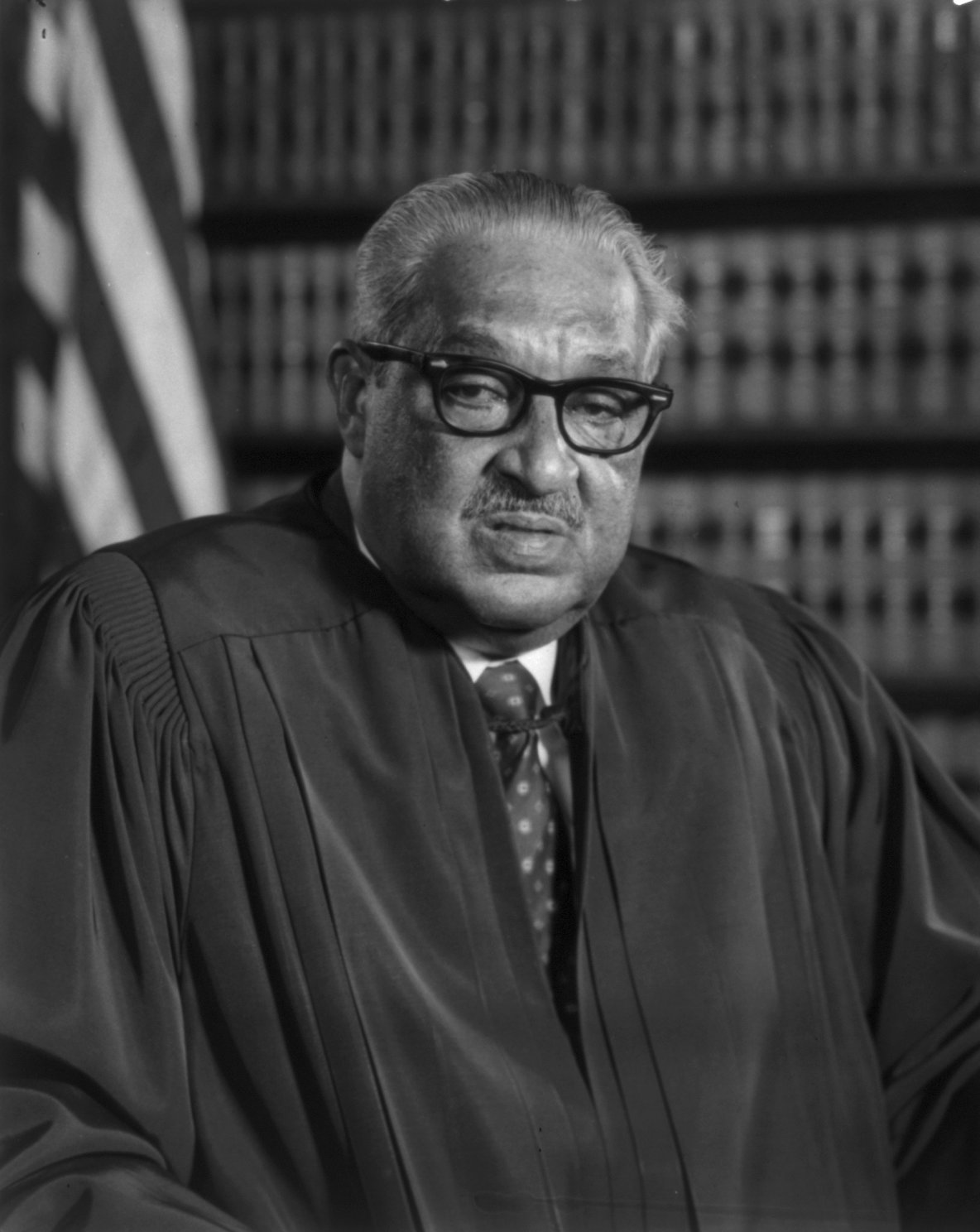
Thurgood Marshall, United States Supreme Court Justice

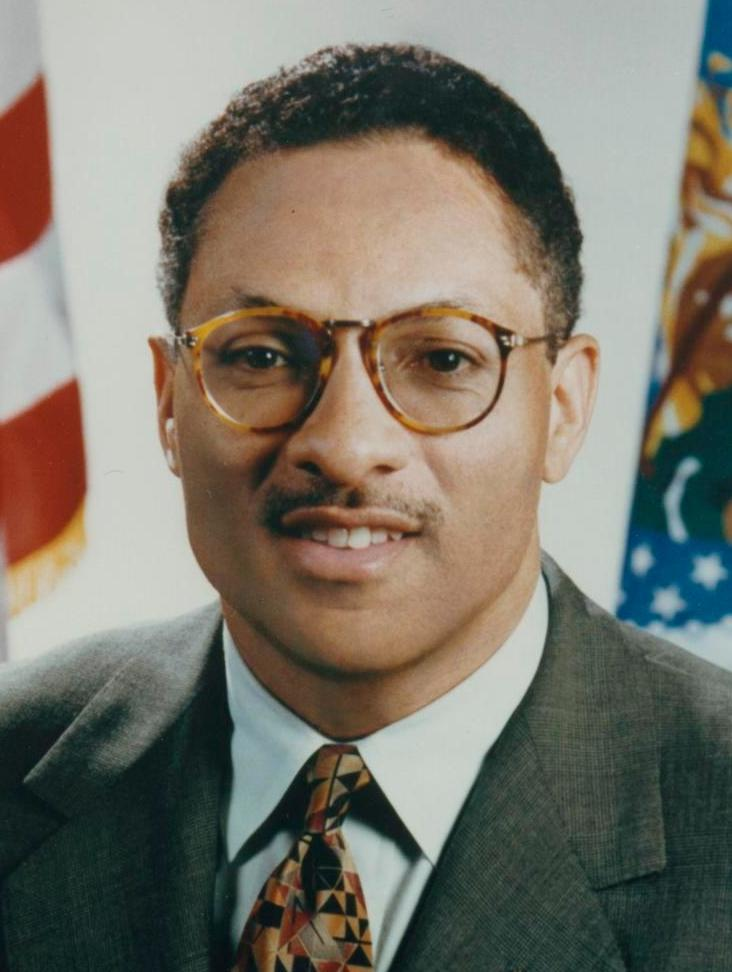
Mike Espy, 25th United States secretary of agriculture

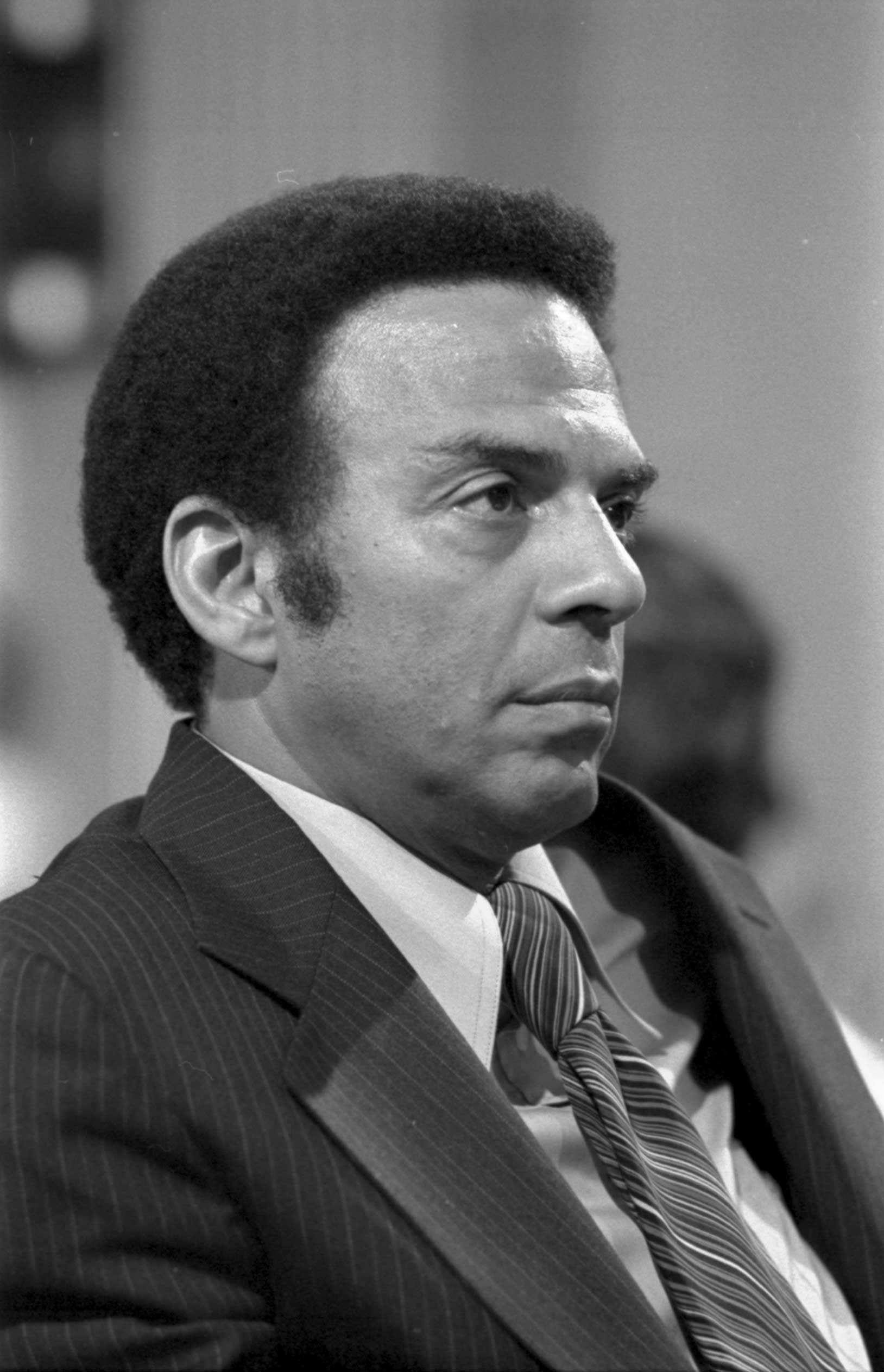
Andrew Young, U.S. ambassador to the UN and U.S. congressman from Georgia

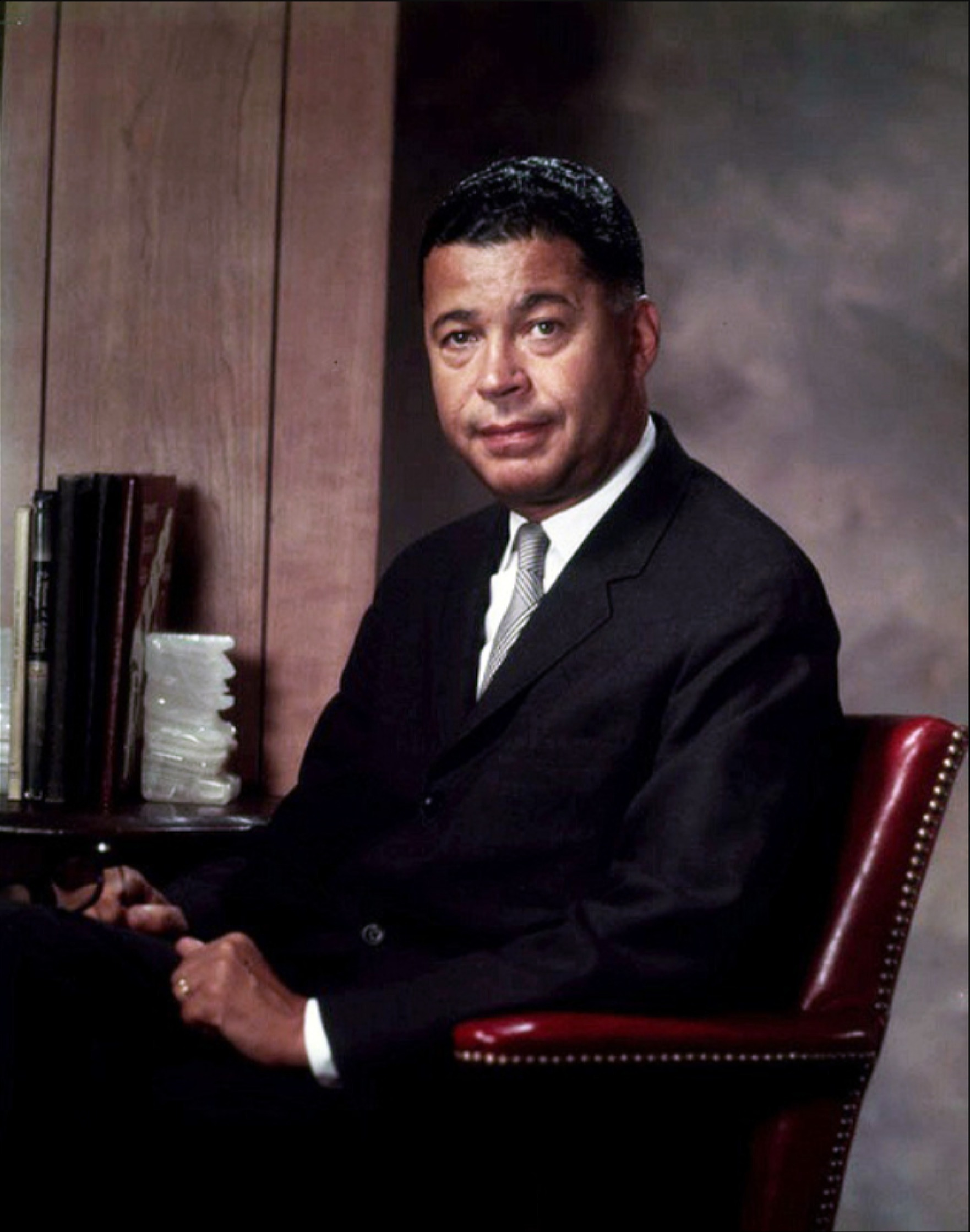
Edward Brooke, U.S. senator

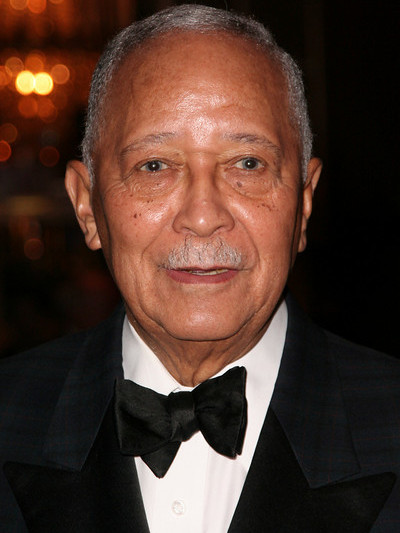
David Dinkins, 106th mayor of New York City

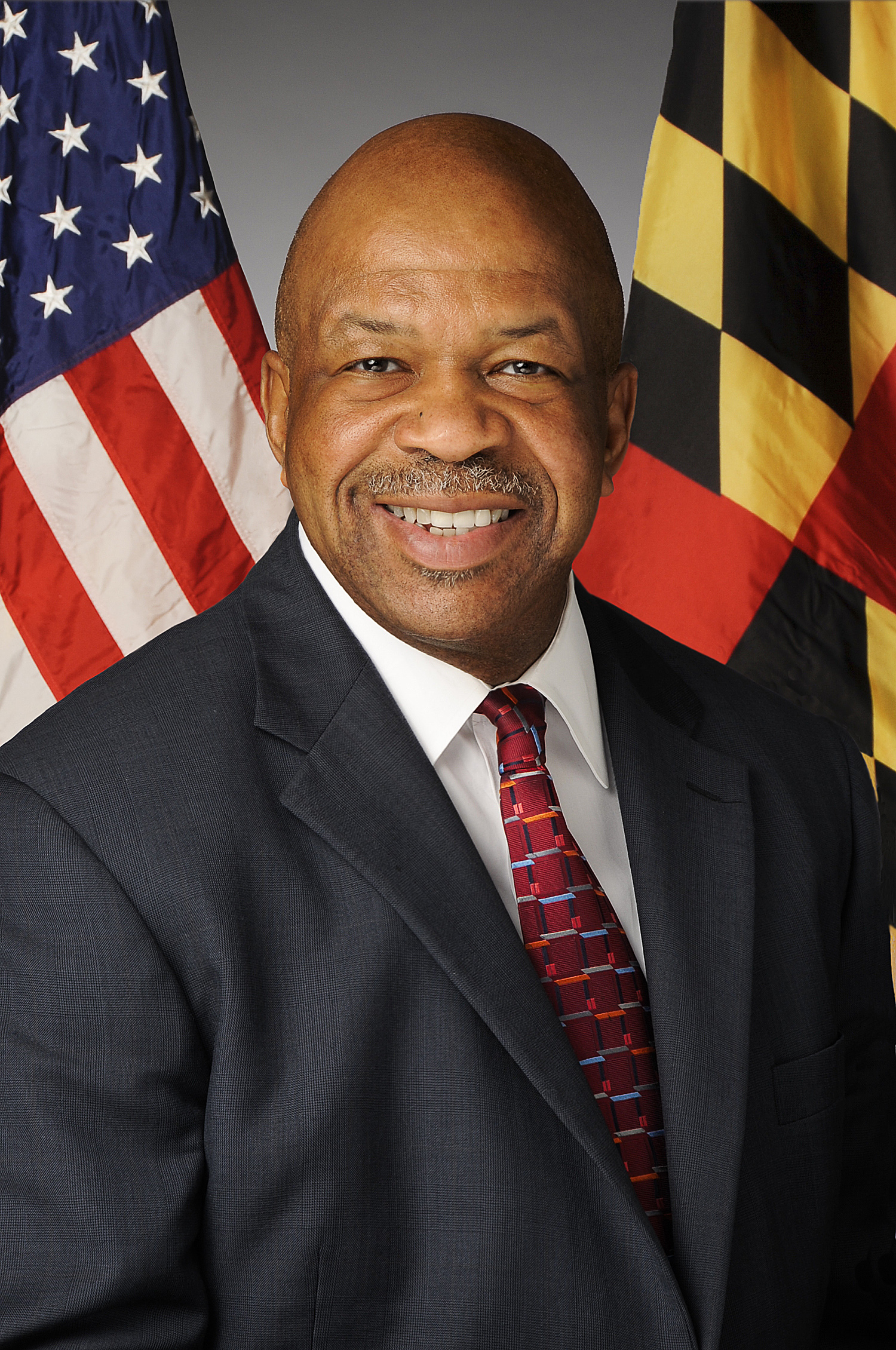
Elijah Cummings, United States representative

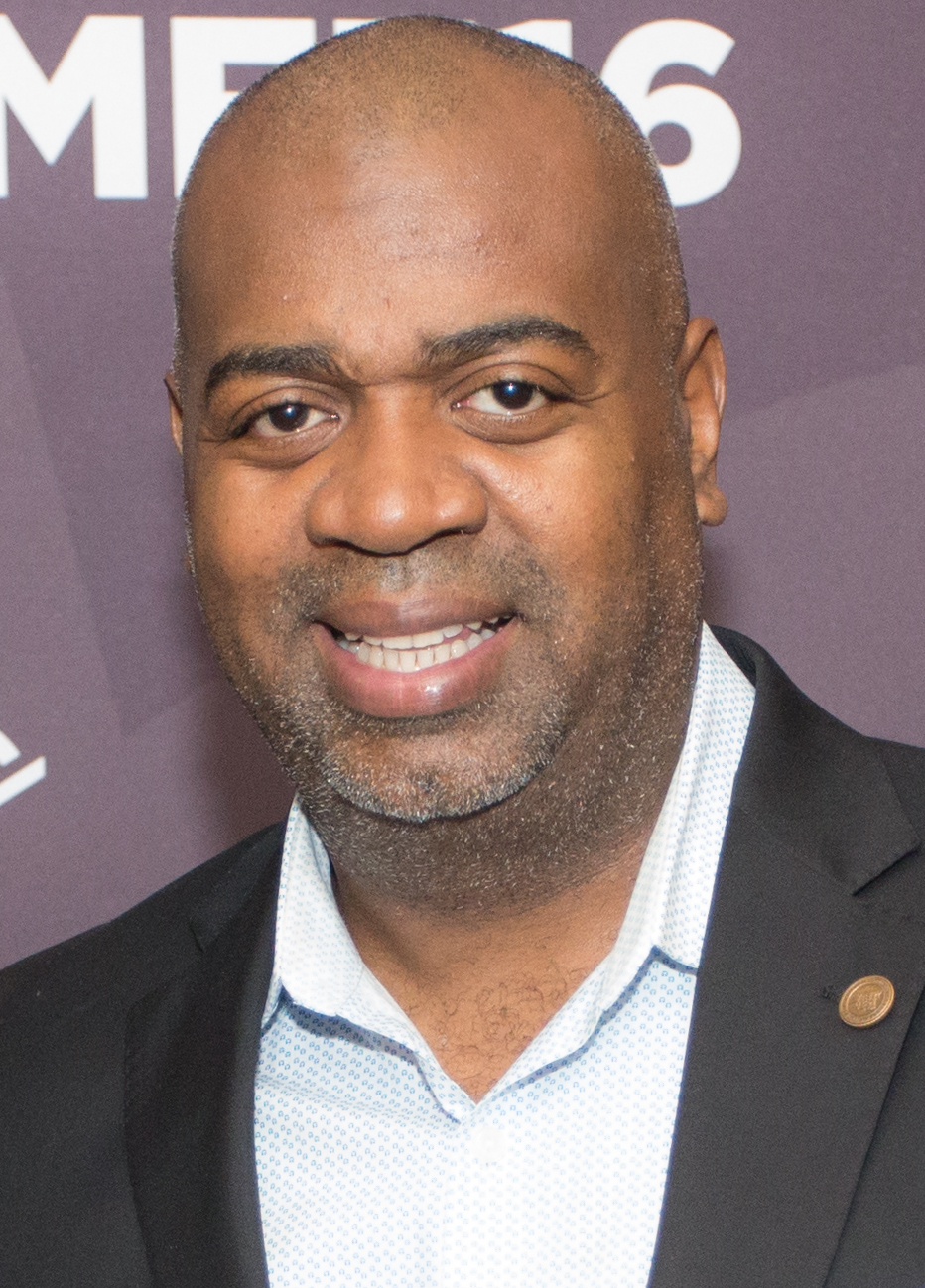
Ras Baraka, mayor of Newark, New Jersey

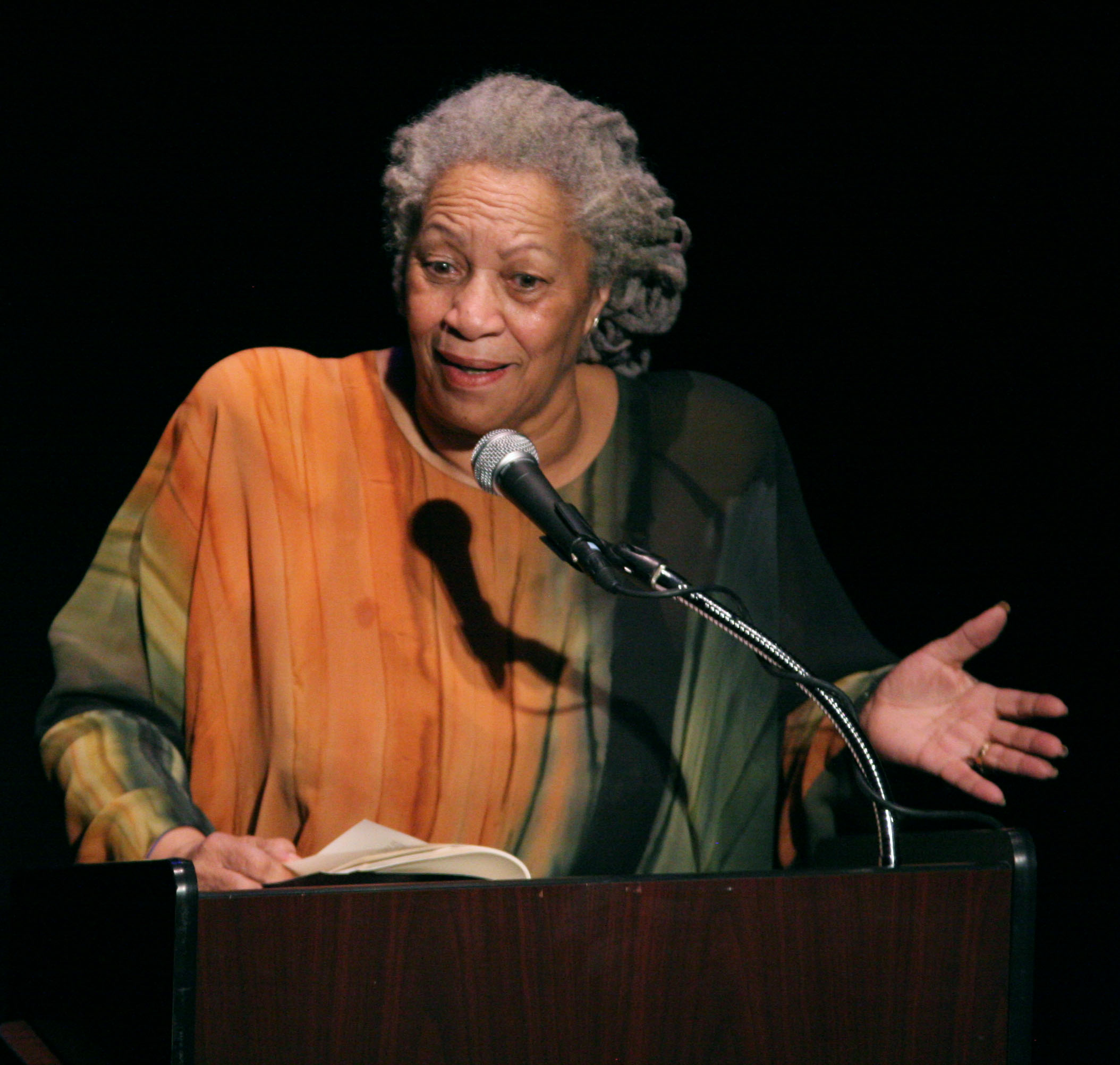
Toni Morrison, Pulitzer Prize- and Nobel Prize-winning novelist

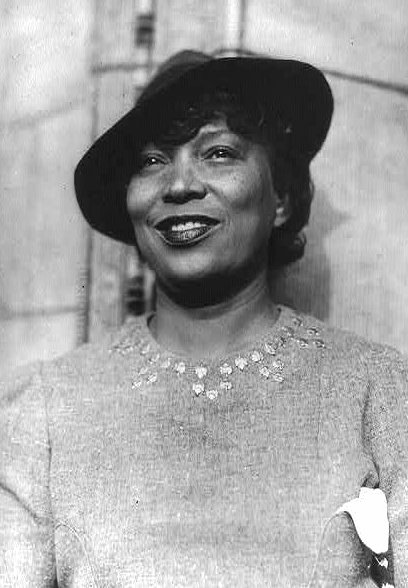
Zora Neale Hurston, author and anthropologist

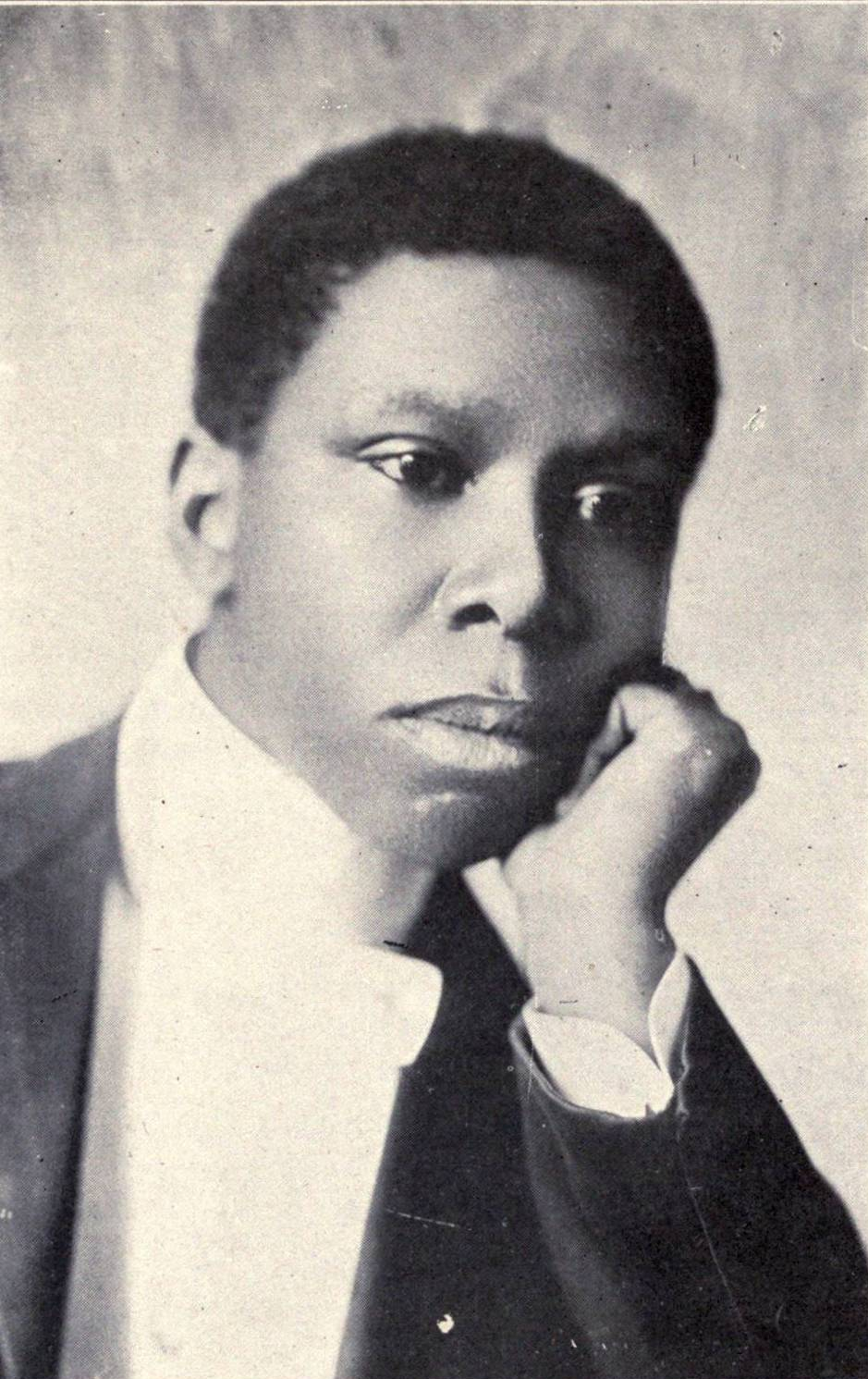
Paul Laurence Dunbar, novelist and poet

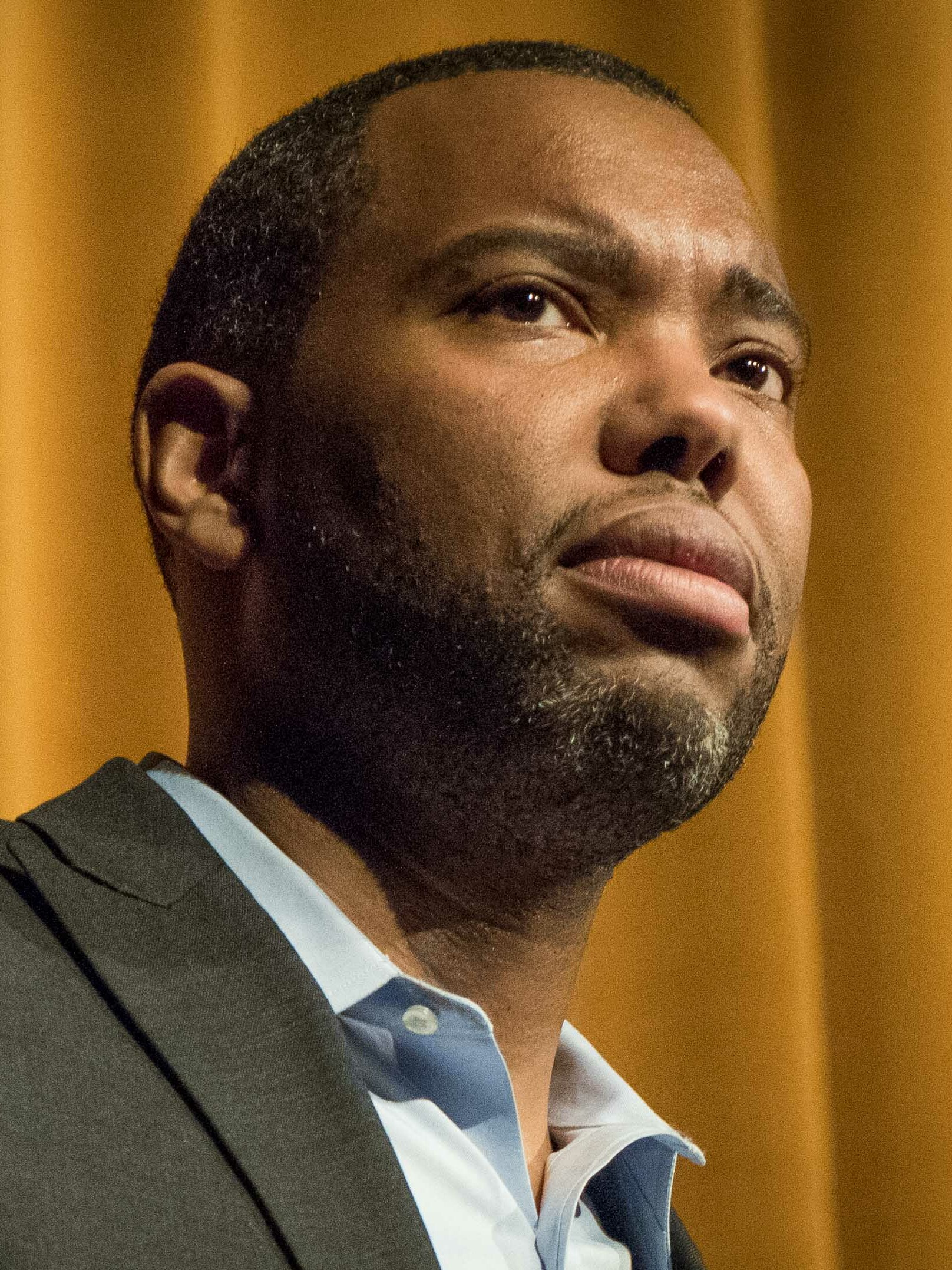
Ta-Nehisi Coates, writer and journalist

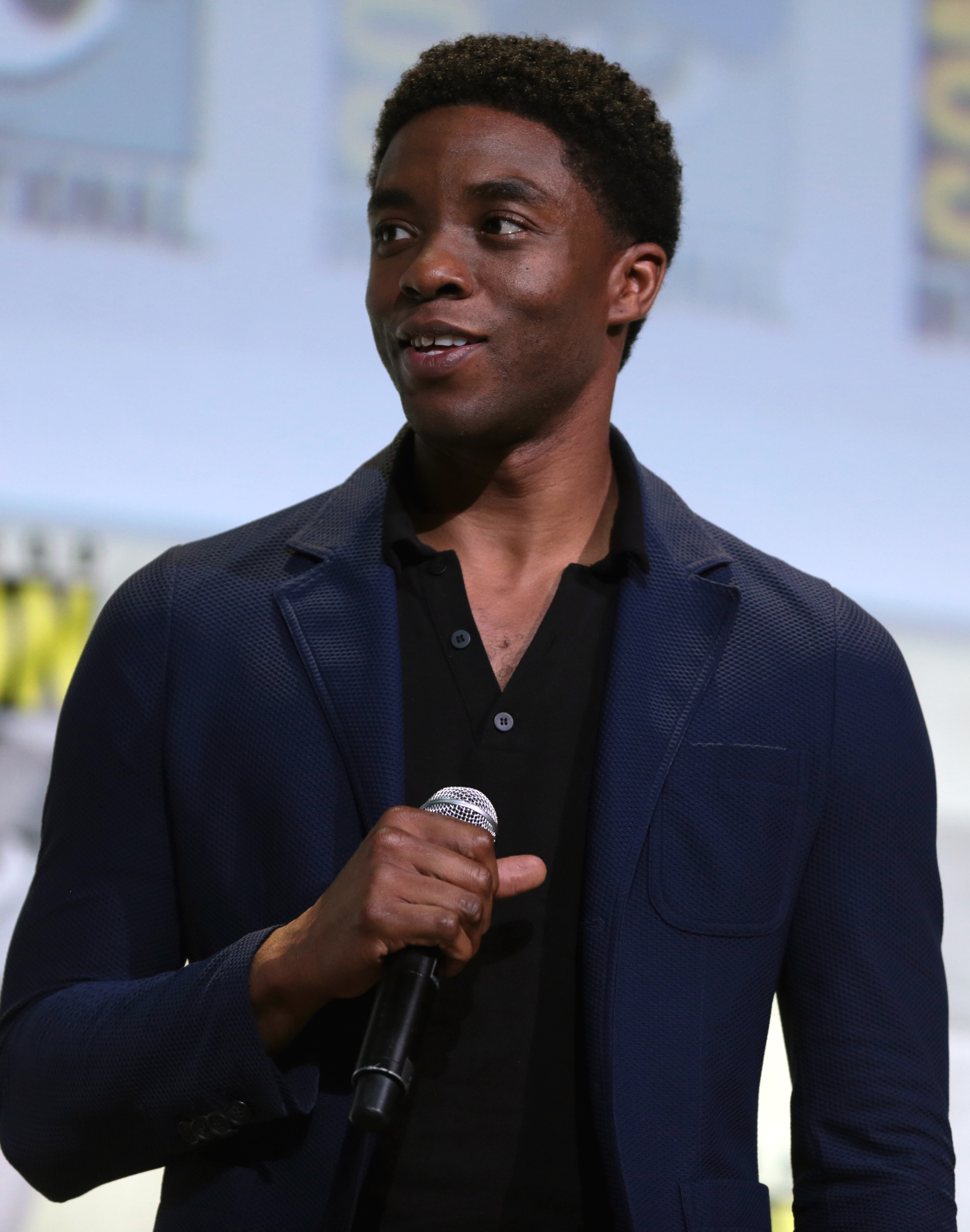
Chadwick Boseman, actor

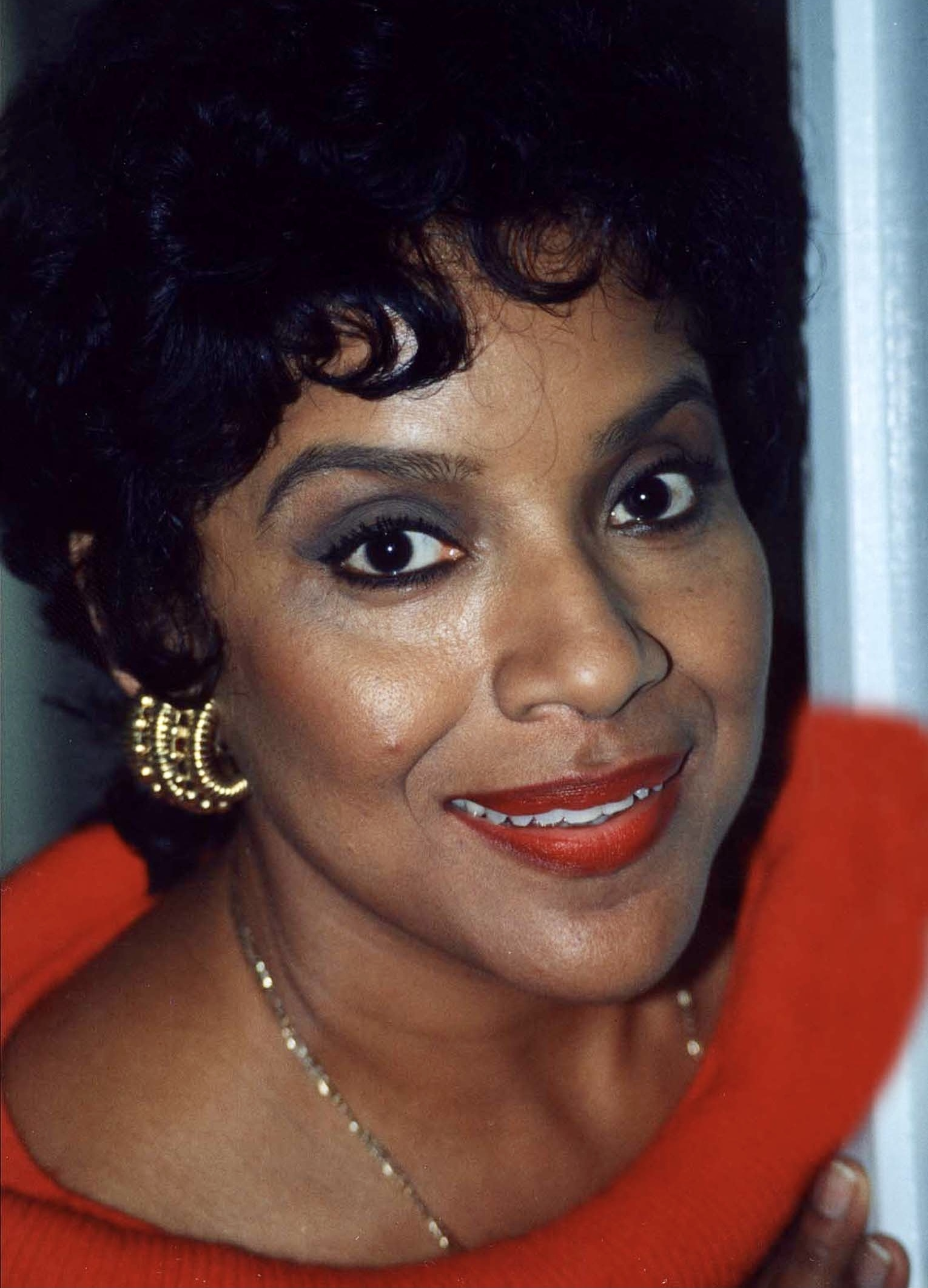
Phylicia Rashad, actress

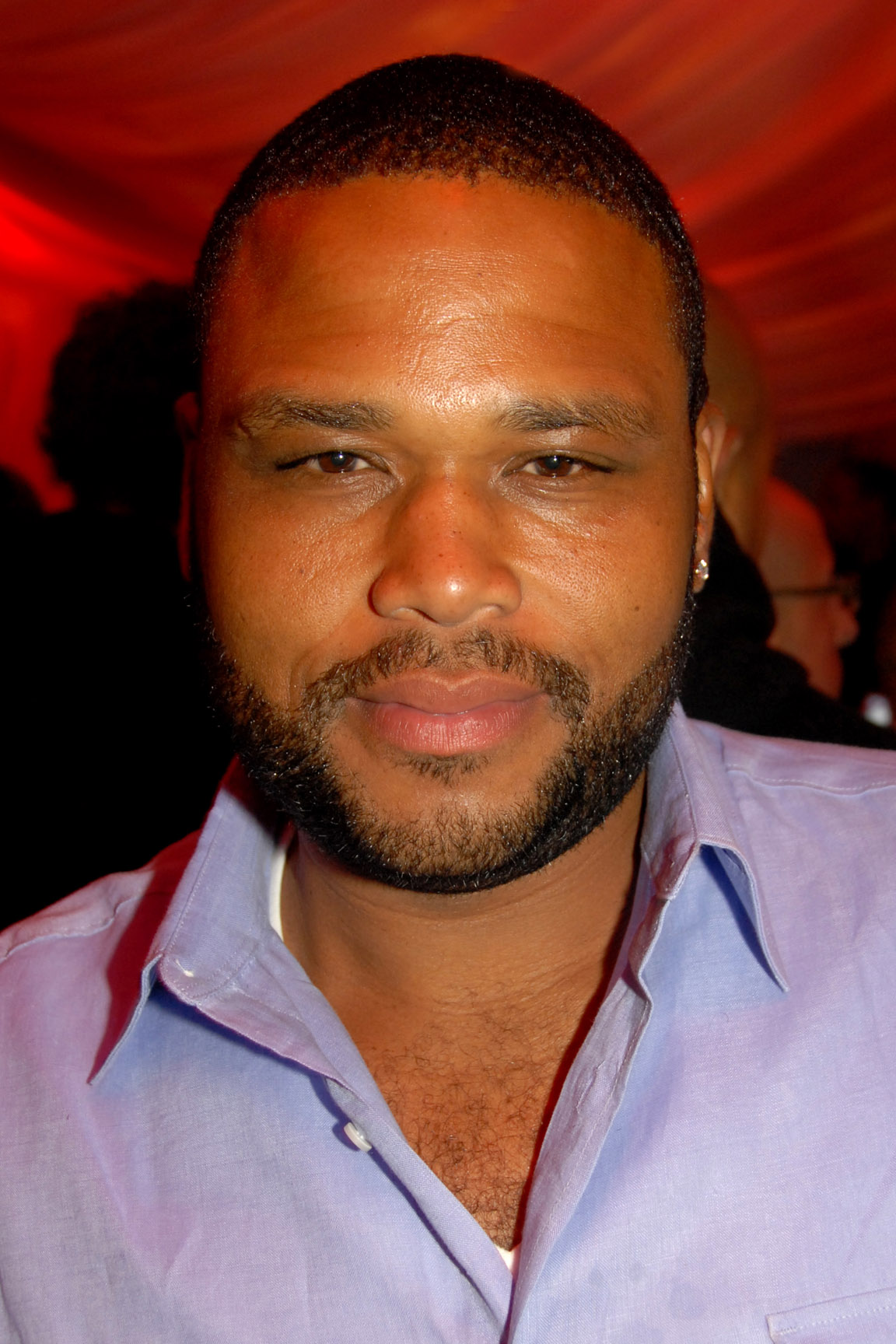
Anthony Anderson, actor

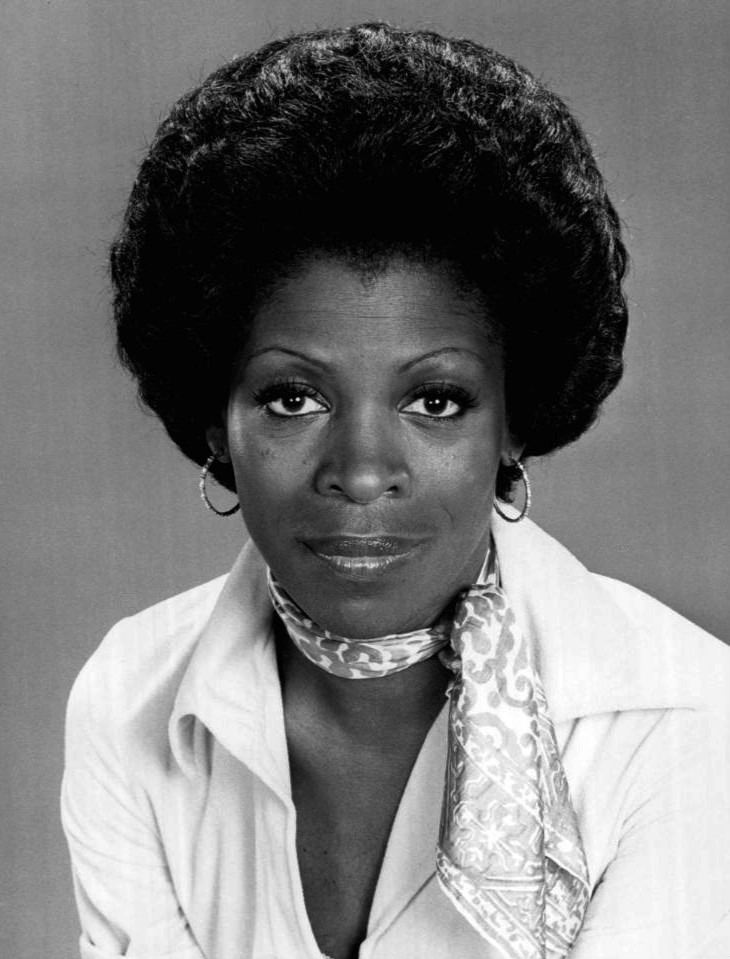
Roxie Roker, actress

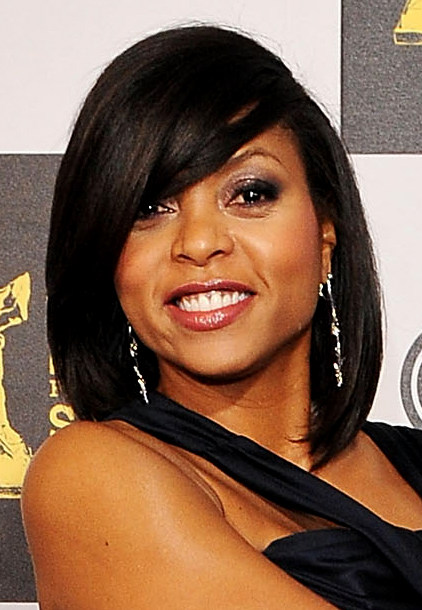
Taraji P. Henson, actress

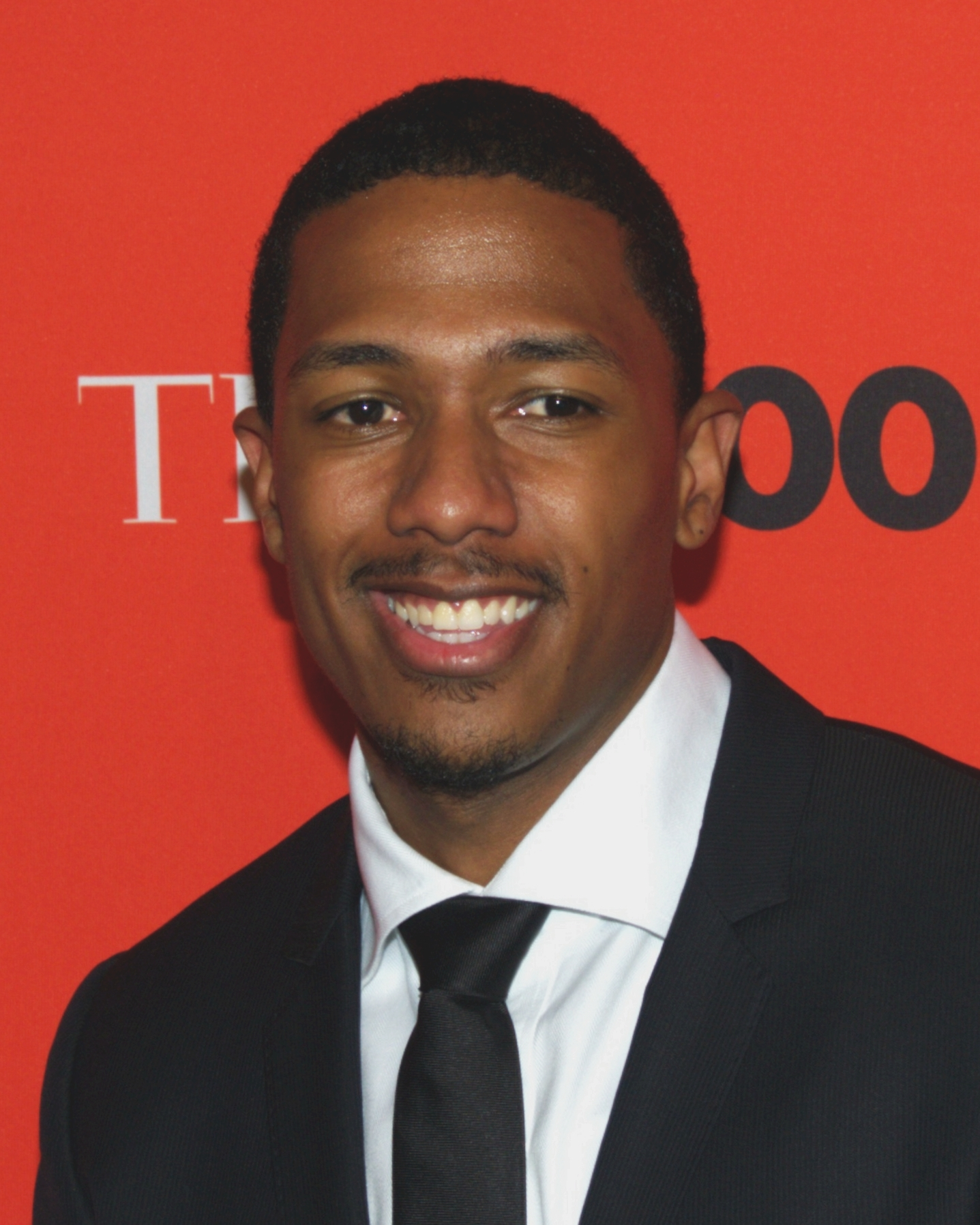
Nick Cannon, comedian, rapper and television host

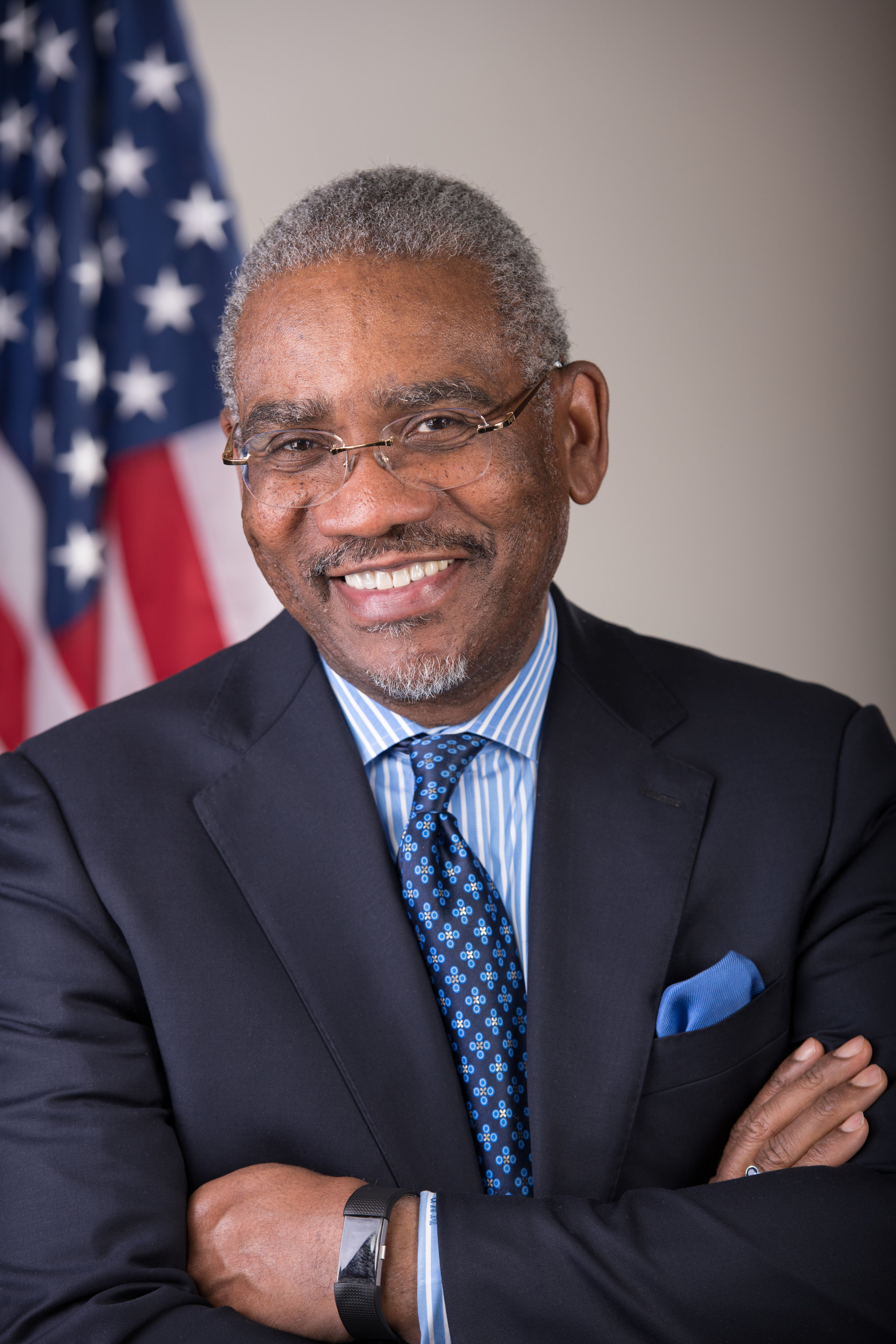
Gregory Meeks, U.S. representative for New York's 5th congressional district

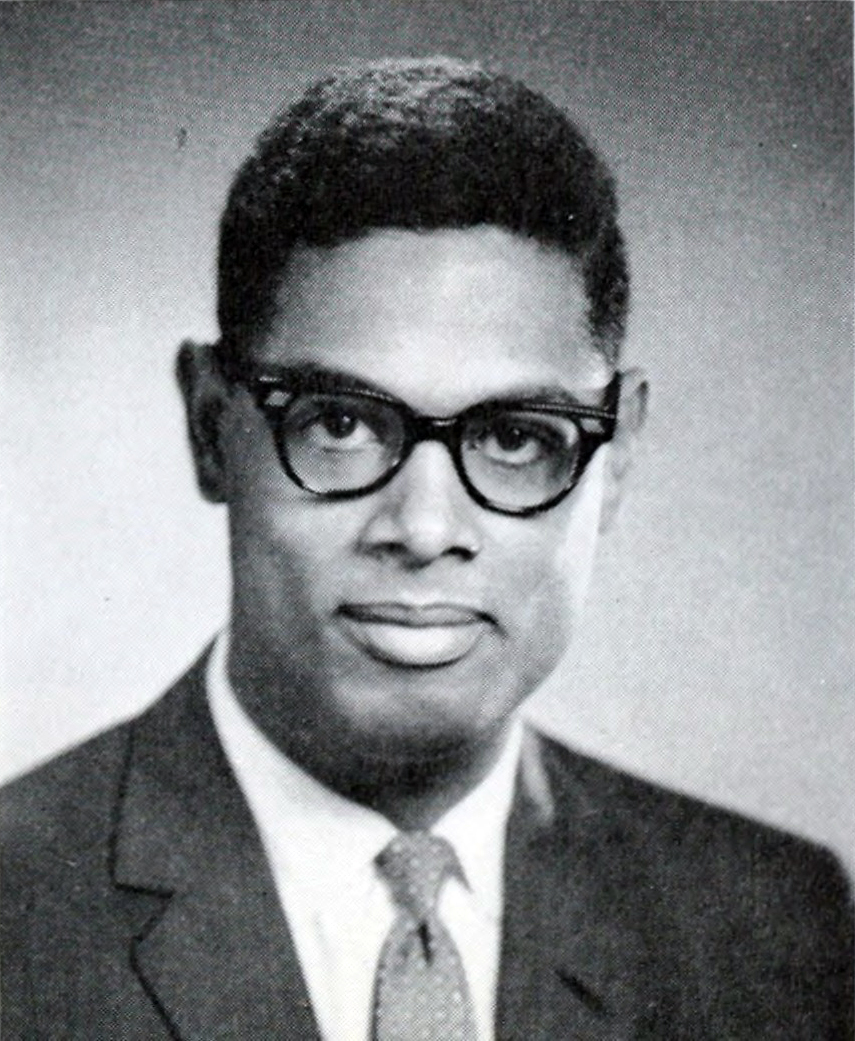
Thomas Sowell, economist, author and social commentator (attended)

== See also ==
- A Bridge Across and Beyond by artist Richard Hunt (a sculpture at the Blackburn Fountain)
- Howard Theatre
- List of presidents of Howard University
