= Howard University School of Communications =

Cathy Hughes School Of Communications
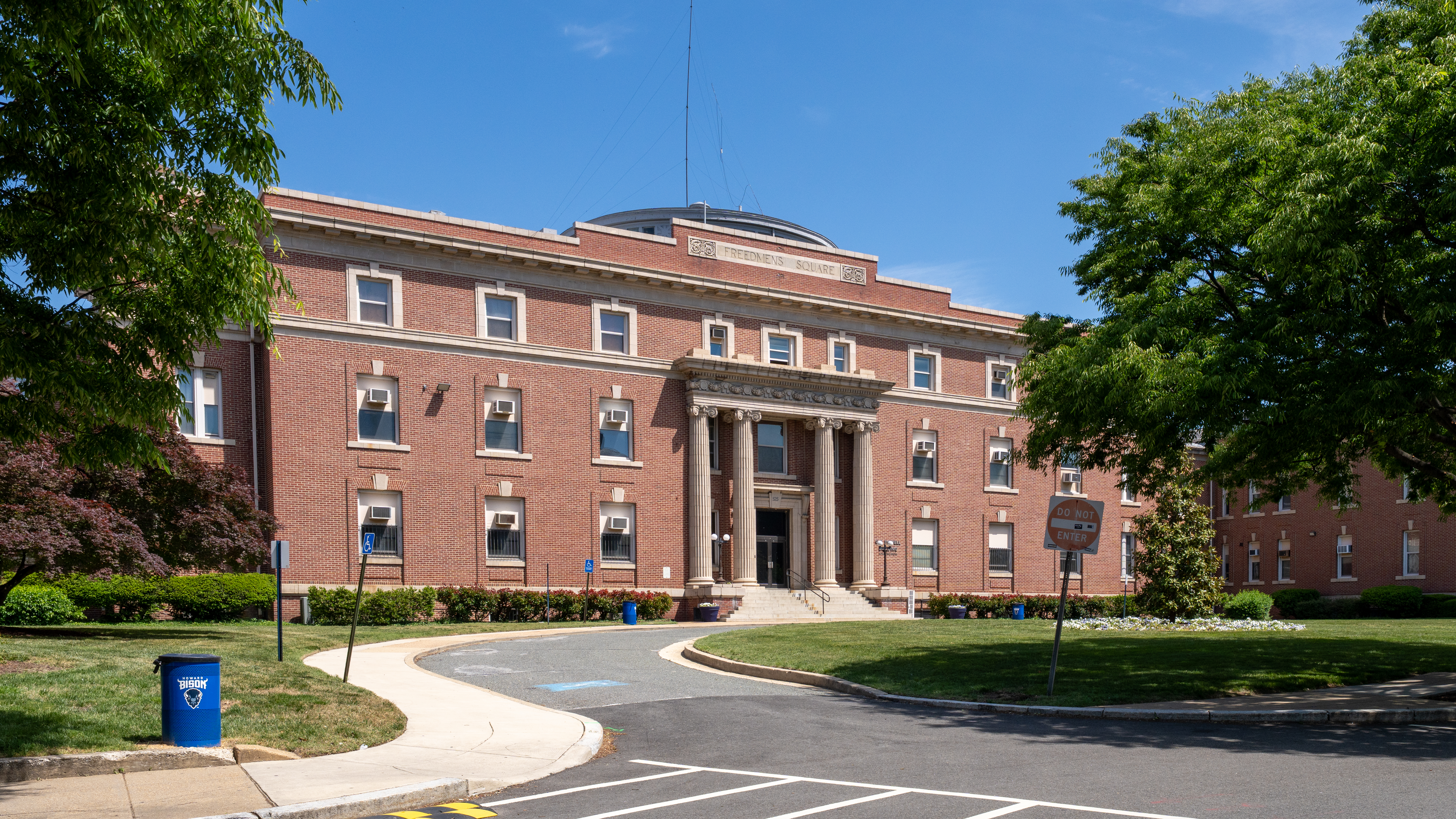
- Type: Private
- Established: 1971; 55 years ago
- Dean: Gracie Lawson-Borders
- Students: 962
- Location: Washington, DC, USA
- Campus: 256 acres (104 ha); urban
- Website: communications.howard.edu

The Cathy Hughes School Of Communications ("School of C" or CHSOC) has four departments offering undergraduate and graduate degrees. The Departments include: Communication, Culture and Media Studies (Ph.D. Only, in three tracks: Health Communication; Media & Cultural Studies; and Technology, Policy & Society); Communication Studies; Media, Journalism and Film; and Communication Sciences and Disorders. The undergraduate programs offer the Bachelor of Arts degree in ten specializations. The Department of Communication Sciences and Disorders offers the Bachelor of Science degree in Speech Pathology/Audiology. All undergraduate departments offer 18-hour minor sequences.

From 2013 to 2024, Gracie Lawson-Borders, a former reporter and editor for the Chicago Tribune and Akron Beacon Journal, served as Dean, effective July 1, 2013 she replaced Jannette L. Dates. She is the former associate dean of the College of Arts and Sciences at the University of Wyoming, where she also was professor of communication and journalism and director of the African American and Diaspora Studies program.

Dr. Chuka Onwumechili served as Interim Dean of the School of Communications from 2024 to 2025.

Dr. Kimberly R. Moffitt was appointed Dean of the Cathy Hughes School of Communications as of August 1, 2025. Dr. Moffitt is a Howard alumna and was previously Dean of the College of Arts, Humanities, and Social Sciences and professor of Language, Literacy, and Culture at the University of Maryland, Baltimore County (UMBC). She is also president of the National Association for Media Literacy Education.

== Academics ==
The College enrolls approximately 962 undergraduate students in over 10 fields, and doctoral, MA and MFA students.

Departments

- Communication, Culture and Media Studies (Ph.D.)
- Media, Journalism and Film — Audio Production (B.A.)
- Media, Journalism and Film — Journalism (B.A.)
- Media, Journalism and Film — Television and Film (B.A.)
- Communication Studies - Public Relations (B.A.)
- Communication Studies - Advertising (B.A.)
- Communication Studies- Legal Communication (B.A.)
- Communication Studies- Organizational Communications (B.A.)
- Communication Studies— Media Management Sequence (B.A.)
- Communication Sciences and Disorders (Ph.D & M.A)
- Film (MFA)
- Technology, Policy & Society (M.A)
