= Blackburn Takeover =

2021 student protest at Howard University

The Blackburn Takeover was a student protest at Howard University in Washington, D.C. that started on October 12, 2021 and ended on November 15, 2021, and was put on to protest poor housing conditions and lack of representation. The hashtag #BlackburnTakeover went viral on social media platforms including Instagram and Twitter. The Live Movement, which is an HBCU coalition, helped in amplifying the protest along with member leaders from the Howard based chapter of Young Democratic Socialists of America and Afro-socialists and Howard University NAACP. A primary complaint of the protesters included mold, mice, flooding and substandard living conditions in residential buildings on campus as well as lack of affiliate trustee representation on the Howard Board of Trustees. Around 150 students erected a tent city outside of the Blackburn University Center, demanding an improvement in living conditions and representation on the university's board of trustees.

The students' demands were:

- A town hall with President Wayne A.I. Frederick and the entire student body
- Student trustee positions to be permanently reinstated to the Board of Trustees of Howard University
- A comprehensive housing plan to remedy all issues plaguing on campus and off campus housing
- Academic, legal, and disciplinary immunity for all protestors involved

== Reaction ==
The university claimed that as a result of the protest, Sodexho food service employees of the Blackburn café were laid off.

A number of prominent figures came out in support of the student protest.

- Senator Elizabeth Warren pledged her solidarity with students on Twitter
- Reverend Jesse Jackson visited the school to show his support.
- Rapper Gucci Mane and other performers on his record label pulled out of the university’s homecoming celebration to show support for the student’s demands.
- Local lawmakers additionally showed their support, including At-Large Councilmember Anita Bonds and Ward 4 Councilmember Janeese Lewis George.
