= African American Communication =

2003 book

- Second edition
- Author: Michael L. Hecht, Ronald L. Jackson, Sidney A. Ribeau
- Publisher: L. Erlbaum Associates
- Publication date: 2003
- Pages: 321
- ISBN: 9780805839951

African American Communication: Exploring Identity and Culture is a 2003 book by Michael Hecht, Ronald L. Jackson II and Sidney A. Ribeau.

== Overview ==
The book seeks to demonstrate why and how communication in interpersonal interactions between African Americans differs from that between European Americans. The authors argue that African-American identity, communicative competence, language style and relationship formation and maintenance are strategies adopted in order to navigate a dominant European power structure than inhibits cultural authenticity and access to power. The authors' intent is to establish a starting point for research into the communication styles of African Americans and other cultural groups. The major questions the authors seek to address involve the differences in communicative experiences that are unique to African Americans, how African Americans self-define culturally, and how African Americans perceive intercultural communication. The book concludes by presenting ideas and recommendations for future scholarship, including the necessity of a non-Eurocentric perspective on African-American identities.

== Critical reception ==
Writing in the Southern Communication Journal, Charlton D. McIlwain criticized the book for failing to engage with disputes over the validity of racial differences in a postmodern world and for failing to explain the motivation behind the work or how it would add to understandings of intercultural communication or African Americans' communicative experiences. However, he also noted that the book "does include some discussion of a fairly vast amount of literature", and that it had the "potential to instigate debate over the ontology of human difference." Lillie M. Fears in Mass Communication and Society wrote that "the authors do accomplish their goal of presenting a cultural analysis of African American communication" and that "the book, replete with information from diverse bodies of literature, is really a reader or guide that can be used by researchers seeking to better understand African American culture and communication styles, patterns, and even some basic history of African peoples in the United States." Gloria Greene in American Speech recommended the chapter on communicative competence "to anyone seeking better understanding of how to communicate effectively with African Americans and other cultural groups" and the book as a whole to "sociolinguists who are thinking about this or similar particular topics of communication among cultural groups." Writing in the Journal of Language and Social Psychology, Michael Irvin Arrington praised the authors for their "interpretive, cultural approach", and described the fifth chapter of the second edition, which focuses on intraracial and interracial relationships and friendships, as "impressive" but noted that it failed to address its multiple themes "sufficiently, settling instead for a cursory glance at each topic." Arrington also described the original edition as "groundbreaking in its interactional approach and its subject matter".

== See also ==
- African-American studies
- African American Vernacular English
- Communication studies
