= Michael Hecht =

Michael Hecht may refer to:

- Michael Hecht (communication scientist), communications professor at Penn State University
- Michael Howard or Michael Hecht (born 1941), British politician
- Michael H. Hecht (fl. 1980s–2020s), American astronomer and physicist
- Michael Hecht (footballer) (born 1965), German footballer
- Michael Leonard Hecht (born 1970), American economic developer
