= Wayne Frederick =

Wayne Frederick may refer to:

- Wayne A. I. Frederick (born 1971), a Trinidadian scholar, surgeon, and university administrator
- Wayne Frederick (footballer) (born 2004), a Trinidadian footballer and son of the above
