= Kent Alan Ono =

American academic

- Born: Wyoming

Academic background
- Education: B.A., English (Composition); M.A., Communication; Ph.D., Rhetorical Studies
- Alma mater: DePauw University; Miami University; University of Iowa

Academic work
- Institutions: University of Utah (2012-present); University of Illinois Urbana-Champaign (2002-2012); University of California, Davis (~1992-2002)
- Notable works: Shifting Borders: Rhetoric, Immigration, and California's Proposition 187 (2002); Asian Americans and the Media (2009)

Kent Alan Ono is an American academic, author, and educator. He is currently a professor in the Department of Communication at the University of Utah and was Chair of the department from 2012 to 2017. He was the President of the National Communication Association from 2020 to 2021.

Ono's research focuses on media representations of race, gender, sexuality, class, and nation. His work in the area of rhetoric and communication theory has been focused in the areas of rhetoric, film and media studies, and ethnic and cultural studies. He has authored and edited seven books including Contemporary Media Culture and the Remnants of a Colonial Past (2009), Asian Americans and the Media (2009) and Shifting Borders: Rhetoric, Immigration, and California's Proposition 187 (2002). He is most known for his research on critical rhetoric, vernacular discourse, Japanese American incarceration rhetoric, U.S. immigration rhetoric, Asian American rhetoric, neocolonial criticism and theory, independent film, and contemporary media studies.

He is the past editor of Communication and Critical/Cultural Studies and past co-editor of Critical Studies in Media Communication. He also co-edited the book series, Critical Cultural Communication for New York University Press.

== Early life and education ==
Ono was raised in Wyoming. He attended the University of Wyoming for three years, then transferred to DePauw University, in Greencastle, Indiana, where he completed a B.A. in English (Composition) in 1987. He went on to be a news reporter at the Redlands Daily Facts. Subsequently, he completed an M.A. in Communication at Miami University in 1988. In 1992, he completed his Ph.D. in Rhetorical Studies at the University of Iowa. His dissertation focused on Japanese American protest rhetoric during World War II.

== Career ==
After completing his Ph.D., Ono joined the faculty of the Department of Rhetoric and Communication at the University of California, Davis, as an assistant professor, becoming an associate professor in 1998. At Davis, he co-founded and then was the inaugural director of the Cultural Studies Program (1999-2002) in addition to becoming a member of the American Studies and Asian American Studies programs.

In 2002, Ono left the University of California, Davis, to become the first permanent director of the Asian American Studies Program at the University of Illinois, Urbana-Champaign, where he was a Professor of Asian American Studies and also a professor in the Media and Cinema Studies Department and the Institute of Communications Research. He was appointed the Director of the Asian American Studies Program in 2002 and served in this position until 2007. From 2005 to 2006, he was the Interim Director of the Center on Democracy in a Multicultural Society.

Ono left the University of Illinois in 2012 and joined the University of Utah as Professor of Communication, where he chaired the Communication Department from 2012 to 2017. From 2019 to 2022, he was a Research Fellow and an adjunct professor in the Hugh Downs School of Communication at Arizona State University. He served as President of the National Communication Association in 2020.

Ono was the co-editor of Critical Studies in Media Communication, with Ronald L. Jackson II, from 2011 to 2013 and the Editor of Communication and Critical Cultural Studies from 2013 to 2014. From 2006 to 2014, he was the series co-Editor, with Sarah Banet-Weiser, of "Critical Cultural Communication."

== Research ==
Much of Ono's research at the beginning of his career in the mid-1990s dealt with how race and culture are portrayed in the media and the topic of neocolonialism. He wrote a book chapter entitled "Domesticating Terrorism: A Neocolonial Economy of Différance" in 1996 about the rhetoric of neocolonialism in Pocahontas and Power Rangers. In 2000, he wrote "To Be a Vampire on Buffy the Vampire Slayer: Race and ('Other') Socially Marginalizing Positions on Horror TV" in the book Fantasy Girls.

His work also examines rhetoric, immigration, and media. In 2003, Ono coauthored the book, Shifting Borders: Rhetoric, Immigration, and California's Proposition 187 with John M. Sloop. The book examines immigration and outlaw discourse by examining rhetoric surrounding Proposition 187 that impacted public health, welfare, and education services for undocumented migrants after it was passed by California voters in 1994. In 2004, Shifting Borders received the Book of the Year Award by the Critical and Cultural Studies Division of the National Communication Association. The book was reviewed in the American Journal of Sociology by Pablo Vila who described it as "a very useful and important book" that provides a nuanced analysis of the discourses about the proposition and offers an appealing model of critical rhetoric that intersects academic and activist labor. Jennifer S. Simpson reviewed the book for the Journal of American Ethnic History and described the book as making an important contribution to scholarship on rhetoric, media, and immigration by presenting a case for the role critical rhetoricians might play in social change. For the Southern Communication Journal, Roberto Avant-Mier both critiqued and applauded the book for including many examples and commented, "Yet, to their credit, they carefully crafted a book that awakens the reader to theoretical issues just when the examples start to be too much."

Ono's research also focuses on Asian American studies topics such as the emergence of Asian American communication studies, the politics of Asian American transnationalism, and Asian American studies after 9/11. He was the editor of A Companion to Asian American Studies (2004) and Asian American Studies After Critical Mass (2008) and has several publications focusing on Asian American media. In 2009, he co-authored, with Vincent Pham, the book Asian Americans and The Media, published by Polity Press. The book studies U.S. media representation of Asian Americans and discusses ways Asian Americans have responded to those representations, mostly through their own media productions. Reviewing the book in Journalism Studies, Ron Bishop wrote that "Significant books reveal gaps in knowledge and compel readers to share an author's ideas. This excellent book succeeds on both counts." Olivia Khoo reviewed the book for Continuum: Journal of Media & Cultural Studies and commented that while the book offers a helpful summary of key scholarship on historical Asian American media representations in the first half, she finds the book’s strength and originality in the second half of the book which focuses on Asian American media activism, independent Asian American media, the interface between independent and mainstream media, and new media practices.

In 2009, Ono's book Contemporary Media Culture and the Remnants of a Colonial Past was published by Peter Lang publishing. The book examines contemporary representations of colonialism and discusses neocolonialism in U.S. media culture.

== Awards and honors ==
- 2008 - Charles H. Woolbert Research Award, NCA
- 2014 - Grazier Distinguished Lecture in Communication, University of South Florida
- 2015 - Teachers on Teaching Award, NCA
- 2015 - Distinguished Scholar Award, Rhetorical and Communication Theory Division, NCA
- 2015 - Distinguished Scholar Award, Critical and Cultural Studies Division, NCA
- 2016 - Outstanding Article of the Year Award, International and Intercultural Division, NCA
- 2018 - Douglas W. Ehninger Distinguished Rhetorical Scholar Award, NCA
- 2018 - Distinguished Scholar in the Humanities Award, College of Humanities, University of Utah
- 2020 - Distinguished Scholar Award, Western States Communication Association
- 2021 – Fellow, International Communication Association
- 2022 - Distinguished Scholar Award, National Communication Association (NCA)
- 2022 - Samuel L. Becker Distinguished Service Award, NCA

== Bibliography ==
=== Books ===
- Shifting Borders: Rhetoric, Immigration, and California's "Proposition 187" co-authored with John Sloop (2002) ISBN 9781566399173
- Asian Americans and the Media co-authored with Vincent Pham (2009) ISBN 9780745642741
- Contemporary Media Culture and the Remnants of a Colonial Past (2009) ISBN 9780820479392

=== Books edited ===
- Enterprise Zones: Critical Positions on Star Trek (1996), with Taylor Harrison, Sarah Projansky, and Elyce Helford
- Asian American Studies After Critical Mass (2005)
- A Companion to Asian American Studies (2005)
- Critical Rhetorics of Race (2011), with Michael Lacy

=== Selected articles ===
- Ono, K. A., & Sloop, J. M. (1995). The critique of vernacular discourse. Communication Monographs, 62(1), 19–46.
- Ono, K. A., & Sloop, J. M. (1992). Commitment to telos—a sustained critical rhetoric. Communication Monographs, 59(1), 48–60.
- Ono, K. A., & Buescher, D. T. (2001). Deciphering Pocahontas: Unpackaging the commodification of a Native American woman. Critical Studies in Media Communication, 18(1), 23–43.
- Buescher, D. T., & Ono, K. A. (1996). Civilized Colonialism: Pocahontas as Neocolonial Rhetoric. Women’s Studies in Communication, 19(2), 127–153.
