= Ronald L. Jackson II =

American academic and author (born 1970)

Ronald L. Jackson II is an American academic and author. He is Past President of the National Communication Association and a professor of communication, culture, and media, and a former dean of the McMicken College of Arts and Sciences at the University of Cincinnati.

== Early life and education ==
Jackson is a native of the Cincinnati metropolitan area. He graduated from Covington Latin School, then proceeded to earn a BA in speech communication and an MA in organizational communication from the University of Cincinnati (UC) before going on to complete his PhD at Howard University in rhetoric and intercultural communication.

== Career ==
Before arriving at UC, Jackson was a faculty member at Xavier University of Louisiana, Shippensburg University of Pennsylvania, Pennsylvania State University and the University of Illinois at Urbana–Champaign. His research has focused on the communication dimensions of the prevention of prostate cancer among African-American men, and on differing global definitions of masculinity. He has authored or edited 16 books, including Gladiators in Suits: Race, Gender, and the Politics of Representation in Scandal, with Simone Puff and Kimberly Moffitt, Culturing Manhood, coauthored with Murali Balaji, and Marginalized Masculinities, with Jamie Moshin; and was previously editor of the journal Critical Studies in Media Communication.

== Works ==
=== The Negotiation of Cultural Identity (1999) ===
The Negotiation of Cultural Identity: Perceptions of European Americans and African Americans examines African-American and European-American students' identities through focus groups. Jackson's questions focus on similarities and differences between African Americans' and European Americans' cultural self-definitions, similarities and differences in their negotiations of cultural identity, the long-term consequences of cultural identity negotiation, and the conditions under which cultural identities are reconsidered. Jackson finds that European Americans' lives are largely unexamined in the cultural realm, whereas African Americans believed in the necessity of a strong cultural identity. Writing in the Journal of Communication, Heather Hartwig Boyd praised Jackson's approach and analysis as offering "useful insights about how respondents do or do not define their own cultures", but suggested that the focus group approach may not be "the most effective way to determine whether the respondents have experienced long-term consequences to identity negotiation." In the Quarterly Journal of Speech Felicia F. Jordan-Jackson praised Jackson's use of qualitative and quantitative methods and wrote that he "deserves to be commended for addressing such a timely and relevant topic."

=== African American Communication (2003) ===
African American Communication: Exploring Identity and Culture, coauthored with Michael Hecht and Sidney A. Ribeau, seeks to demonstrate why and how communication in interpersonal interactions between African Americans differs from that between European Americans. The authors argue that African-American identity, communicative competence, language style and relationship formation and maintenance are strategies adopted in order to navigate a dominant European power structure than inhibits cultural authenticity and access to power. The book won the 2003 National Communication Association African American Communication & Culture's Distinguished Scholarship Award.

=== Understanding African American Rhetoric (2003) ===
Understanding African American Rhetoric: Classical Origins to Contemporary Innovations is a collection of essays edited by Jackson and Elaine B. Richardson. Winner of the National Communication Association African American Communication & Culture's 2004 Distinguished Scholarship Award the book seeks to challenge Eurocentric assumptions in communication studies and to celebrate the African American rhetorical tradition, and covers topics including conceptions of African rhetoric as a rhetoric of community and resistance, a new orientation toward rhetoric centering oral discourse, and the politics of defining African American rhetoric. Cory L. Young, writing in the Southern Communication Journal, found the strength of the collection in its "broad range of essays that appeals to a wide variety of academic audiences, and its dialectical perspective and embrace of the "contradictions and tensions inherent in the labels African and American."

=== African American Rhetoric(s) (2004) ===
African American Rhetoric(s): Interdisciplinary Perspectives is a collection of 14 essays edited by Jackson and Elaine B. Richardson, with an introduction by Keith Gilyard. Writing for Choice: Current Reviews for Academic Libraries, R. B. Schuman described the book's insights as "disparate but important" and singled out Kali Tal's essay "From Panther to Monster", on the Black Power movement, for praise.

=== Black Pioneers in Communication Research (2006) ===
Black Pioneers in Communication Research, written by Jackson and Sonja M. Brown Givens, is the 2006 winner of the National Communication Association African American Communication & Culture Division's award for scholarly excellence. It is a one-of-a-kind collection of biographical and critical snapshots of black scholars in communication studies, including Molefi Kete Asante, Donald Bogle, Oscar H. Gandy Jr., and Stuart Hall. The authors argue that mainstream scholarship has failed to acknowledge the contributions of black thinkers. Bryant Keith Alexander, writing in the European Journal of Cultural Studies, praised the book's biographical sections, which "outline central components and values of African-based cultures" and described the book as a whole as "a much-needed volume for both young black scholars seeking a historical foothold ... as well as scholars seeking to understand the tone and tenure, the breadth and depth of scholarship written by black communication scholars".

=== Scripting the Black Masculine Body (2006) ===
In Scripting the Black Masculine Body: Identity, Discourse and Racial Politics in Popular Media Jackson uses approaches from intercultural communication and critical identity studies to argue for a "scripting" (see Behavioral script) of African American identities, especially with regard to the black male body. He focuses on black body politics in the Jim Crow era and contemporary productions of black masculinity in film, music and news broadcasts. This book won the 2007 National Communication Association International & Intercultural Communication Division award for best scholarly book. Writing for Choice: Current Reviews for Academic Libraries, D. E. Magill described the book as "a significant contribution to the literature on masculinity studies, African American studies, and intercultural communications ... Highly recommended.

=== Encyclopedia of Identity (2010) ===
The Encyclopedia of Identity, edited by Jackson won the 2011 American Library Association's Outstanding Reference Source award. It is an encyclopedia comprising over 300 entries that approach identity as a socially constructed phenomenon and address its relevance to everyday life. W. Fontaine, writing for Choice: Current Reviews for Academic Libraries, recommended the encyclopedia "for libraries serving programs focused on issues of identity" but criticised the articles' bibliographies and uneven level of comprehensibility.

=== Masculinity in the Black Imagination (2011) ===
Masculinity in the Black Imagination: Politics of Communicating Race and Manhood is a collection of essays edited by Jackson and Mark C. Hopson. The book employs an interdisciplinary approach to examine black masculinity, focusing on communication studies, ethnography, history, psychology and sociology. The editors propose that moving beyond the discourse of black masculinity requires an expansion of the imagination. Topics covered include the history of racism in the United States in comparison with racism in Australia, black Greek letter organizations, black men's performances of gender and masculinity, black masculinity in different forms of media, and personal examinations of black masculinity. Marjorie L. Dorimé-Williams in Spectrum: A Journal on Black Men described the book as "a worthwhile contribution to the field of gender studies, Black male masculinity, and the general conversation about race and gender relations."

=== Black Comics (2013) ===
Black Comics: Politics of Race and Representation is a collection of essays edited by Jackson and Sheena C. Howard, and winner of the 2014 International Comic-Con Will Eisner Award for Best Academic/Scholarly Work. Sheena Howard became the 1st African American woman to receive the coveted Eisner Award. The essays analyze comic books, graphic novels, newspaper strips and political cartoons by and about African Americans, from both contemporary and historical perspectives. Topics covered include the political activism of cartoonist Jackie Ormes, cartoon depictions of Condoleezza Rice, and Aaron McGruder's The Boondocks. J. A. Lent, writing for Choice: Current Reviews for Academic Libraries, recommended the book but warned of "shoddy editing" and noted that the essays "vary in quality and proficiency".

== Bibliography ==
=== Written by Jackson ===
- The Negotiation of Cultural Identity: Perceptions of European Americans and African Americans (1999)
- African American Communication: Exploring Identity and Culture (Michael L. Hecht, Ronald L. Jackson II and Sidney A. Ribeau, 2003)
- Scripting the Black Masculine Body: Identity, Discourse and Racial Politics in Popular Media (2006)
- Black Pioneers in Communication Research (Ronald L. Jackson II and Sonja M. Brown Givens, 2006)
- Think About It: Questions on Race and Self Discovery (Ronald L. Jackson II, 2000)
- African American Communication: Exploring Identity and Culture (Ronald L. Jackson II, Amber Johnson, Michael L. Hecht, and Sidney A. Ribeau, 2020)

=== Edited by Jackson ===
- Understanding African American Rhetoric: Classical Origins to Contemporary Innovations (edited by Ronald L. Jackson and Elaine B. Richardson, 2003)
- African American Communication and Identities: Essential Readings (edited by Ronald L. Jackson II, 2004)
- African American Rhetoric(s): Interdisciplinary Perspectives (edited by Ronald L. Jackson II and Elaine B. Richardson, 2004)
- Encyclopedia of Identity (edited by Ronald L. Jackson II and Michael A. Hogg, 2010)
- Global Masculinities and Manhood (edited by Ronald L. Jackson II and Murali Balaji, 2011)
- Masculinity in the Black Imagination (edited by Ronald L. Jackson and Mark C. Hopson, 2011)
- Black Comics: Politics of Race and Representation (edited by Sheena C. Howard and Ronald L. Jackson II, 2013)
- Communicating Marginalized Masculinities: Identity Politics in TV, Film, and New Media (edited by Ronald L. Jackson II and Jamie E. Moshin, 2013)
- Interpreting Tyler Perry: Perspectives on Race, Class, Gender and Sexuality (edited by Jamel Santa Cruz Bell and Ronald L. Jackson II, 2014)
- Gladiators in Suits: Race, Gender and the Politics of Representation in Scandal (edited by Simone Puff, Kimberly Moffitt, and Ronald L. Jackson II, 2019)
