= Swygert =

Swygert is a surname. Notable people with the surname include:

- H. Patrick Swygert (born 1943), America university president
- Luther Merritt Swygert (1905–1988), American judge
