= Elaine Richardson =

Elaine Richardson may refer to:

- Elaine Richardson (writer) (born 1960), professor of literacy studies and author
- Elaine Richardson (politician) (born 1940), American politician in the Arizona House of Representatives
