= Carol Cartwright =

American academic administrator

President of Kent State University
- In office March 1991 – July 2006
- Preceded by: Michael Schwartz (educational administrator)
- Succeeded by: Lester Lefton

President of Bowling Green State University
- In office 2008–2011
- Preceded by: Sidney A. Ribeau
- Succeeded by: Mary Ellen Mazey

Personal details
- Born: 1941 (age 84–85)
- Spouse: Dr. G. Phillip Cartwright
- Children: Three
- Education: University of Wisconsin Whitewater (B.A.), University of Pittsburgh (M.A., Ph.D.)

Carol A. Cartwright is an American academic administrator who served as president of Kent State University and, later, of Bowling Green State University.

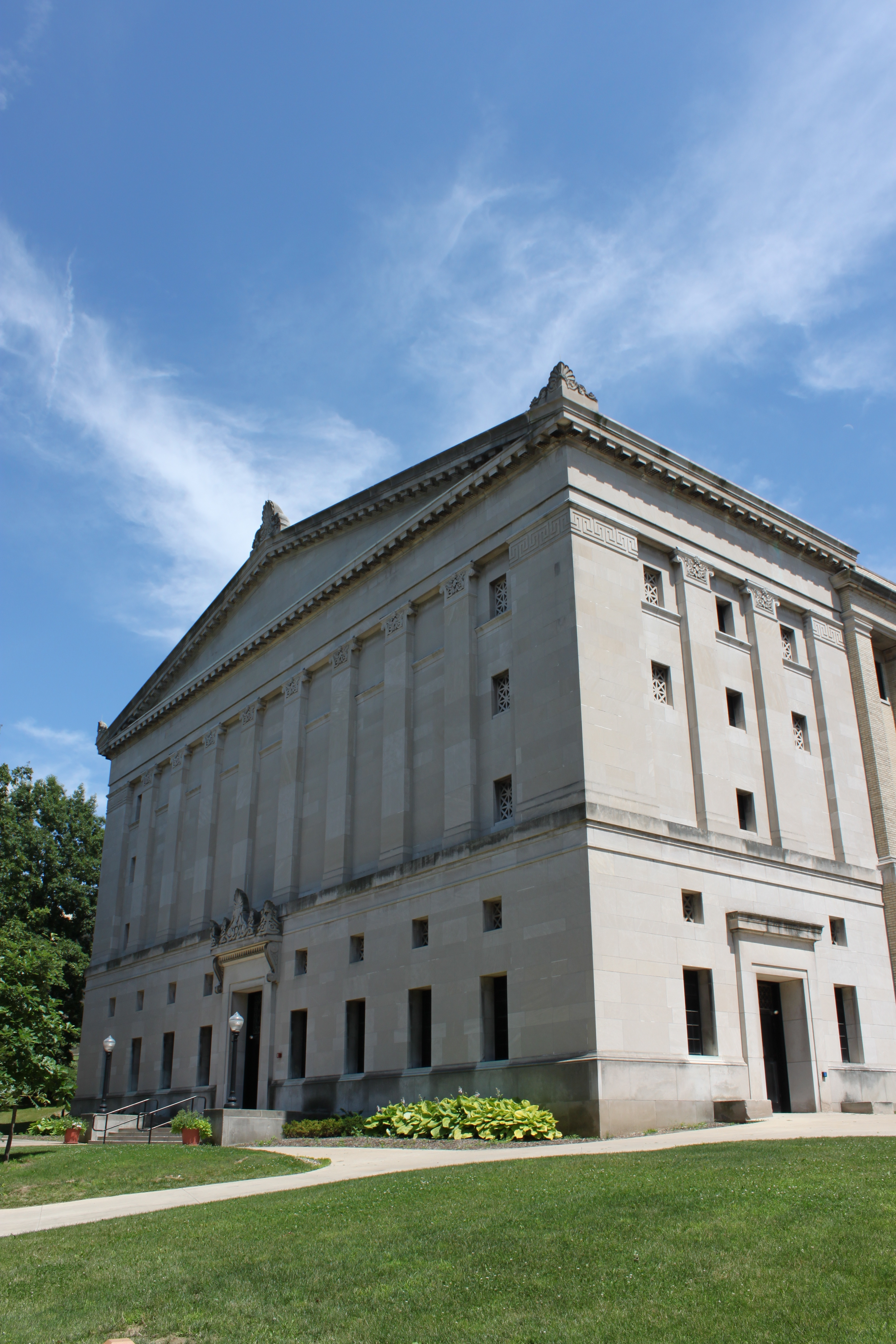
Cartwright Hall at Kent State University was named after Carol Cartwright

== Early life and career ==
Carol Cartwright was born in 1941. She earned her bachelor's degree from the University of Wisconsin–Whitewater and her master's and doctoral degrees from the University of Pittsburgh. She was a member of the faculty of Pennsylvania State University from 1967 through 1988, and later served as dean for undergraduate programs and vice provost at Penn State. She also served as vice chancellor for Academic Affairs at the University of California at Davis.

== Kent State ==
Cartwright served as the 10th president of Kent State University from March 1991 until July 2006, making her the first woman to serve as president of any Ohio public college or university.

During her tenure at Kent State, she oversaw the establishment of new colleges and academic programs, the introduction of new technologies, and increases in enrollment; she also oversaw an extensive the extensive construction of new campus buildings, including the Centennial Court dormitories and a new honors college complex, and the renovation of several others. She also oversaw the completion of the university's first major fund-raising campaign.

Upon retirement from Kent State, the auditorium building on the university's Kent campus was renamed Cartwright Hall in her honor.

== Bowling Green ==
Cartwright came out of retirement to serve as interim president at Bowling Green in July 2008, and was named president on January 6, 2009. She retired in June, 2011.

== Other roles ==
Cartwright served on the Knight Commission beginning in 2000, and in 2010 she was elected as vice chair to NPR. Cartwright has served on the boards of directors of KeyCorp (retiring in 2012), Republic Engineered Steels, Inc. (1992–98) the Davey Tree Expert Company (2002–08), PolyOne Corporation, and FirstEnergy Corporation. She currently sits on the Board of Trustees of Heidelberg University.

== Awards and recognitions ==
The Mid-American Conference established the Cartwright Award in her honor, given annually to the member university with the best overall record in athletic competition, academic achievement and public service.

The scope of her contributions to higher education led to Dr. Cartwright's induction into the Ohio Women's Hall of Fame in her first year of eligibility. She has also received numerous other awards, including the Clairol Mentor Award in Education, the northeast Ohio ATHENA Award, the March of Dimes Franklin Delano Roosevelt Humanitarian Award for Excellence, and the American College of Education Mentor of the Year Award. She was made an Honorary Doctor of Humane Letters by Heidelberg University in 2012.

== Personal life ==
Cartwright is married to G. Phillip Cartwright. They have three children. She has resided in Napa, California, since 2019.

Academic offices
Preceded by Michael Schwartz (educational administrator)	President of Kent State University; 1991-2006	Succeeded by Lester Lefton
Preceded by Sidney A. Ribeau	President of Bowling Green State University; 2008-2011	Succeeded by Mary Ellen Mazey
