= Sheena Howard =

African-American academic, author and producer

Sheena C. Howard is an African-American academic, author and producer. She is a professor of communication at Rider University. She is also the past chair of the Black Caucus (National Communication Association) and the founder of Power Your Research, an academic branding company. Howard is the recipient of the 2014 Eisner Award for her first book Black Comics: Politics of Race and Representation (2013).

== Early life ==
Howard attended West Catholic Preparatory High School in Philadelphia, where she played basketball, soccer and track. She attended Iona College in New Rochelle, New York and played three years of Division 1 basketball with the Iona Gaels. Howard attended NYIT for master's degree graduating in 2007, and Howard University in Washington, D.C., graduating in 2010 with a PhD in communication and culture.

== Career ==
Howard is a social justice activist and cultural critic, who writes about social and political events with a focus on racial and sexual minorities. From 2011 to 2013 Howard served as a Dissertation Award Committee member, AABHE. She was also a section editor for the Journal of African American Males In Education in 2009.

In 2014, Howard became the first Black woman to win an Eisner Award for her book Black Comics: Politics of Race and Representation. The book, edited with Dr. Ron Jackson II, is based on her dissertation "African American Communication Dynamics Through Black Comics Strips." In an interview with Michael Cavna at The Washington Post, Howard is quoted as saying, "I want people to read the book and learn about the great black creators and writers that were writing characters during a time in which there was immense racism and hatred towards black people. These writers and creators were as much a part of the civil-rights movement as music artists, preachers and speakers."

In 2017, NBC News featured a story on a comic book that Howards co-authored; the lead character in the comic had Down Syndrome. The show noted, "Incorporating a theme of fake news into her latest story line in 'Superb', a comic series co-written by 'Luke Cage' comic writer David F. Walker, the Philadelphia native finds it important to add current political challenges in order to bring ethos and depth to her comic creations. But while her work is often political in nature, she is careful not to inundate adolescent readers with overt commentary."

VIBE magazine also acknowledged Howard's literary contributions: "In the past two years, many of the best-selling and deeply profound books, as well as research, have been headed by women of color: Jacqueline Woodson, Zadie Smith, Jesmyn Ward, Brit Bennett, Angie Thomas, Roxane Gaye, Prof. Brittany Cooper, and newcomer Prof. Keisha Blain, Ava DuVernay and Issa Rae, among others. This phenomenon of black women telling their/our stories isn't new, either. It's just that millennials weren't fortunate enough to witness the god-like momentum of our foremothers. We've had to Google, purchase books, or listen to our elders tell stories of trailblazing black women from way back when. Adding to this vast body of work by black queens is Howard University alumna, Dr. Sheena Howard, associate professor of communication at Rider University. Prof. Howard, [is] also a filmmaker."

== Works ==
- Black Comics: Politics of Race and Representation (2013) Howard discusses Black dominant masculinity within the semantic and artistic views of the comic strip and African American vernacular English. She also traces the history of Black cartoonists' contributions to the medium of comics. For this book, co-edited with Ronald L. Jackson, Howard was presented with an Eisner Award.
- Black Queer Identity Matrix: Towards An Integrated Queer of Color Framework (2014) Howard focuses on the Black lesbian female identity, addressing the intersectionality of race, gender and sexual orientation, and discussing the need for a queer of color conceptual framework. The book calls for a more cohesive outline within queer studies, with a deeper perspective on the variables of ethnicity and race. In a book review in the QED: Journal in GLBTQ Worldmaking, Dominique D. Johnson stated:

Introduced as a response to popular political activism and academic scholarship that excludes black lesbian females' lived experiences, Howard's construction of intersectionality as an analytical praxis is timely and will prove foundational for new lines of thought. In order to better understand the absence (or omission) of certain voices within mainstream LGBTQ political projects and the related conflict in feminist and queer studies scholarship, what is needed is a framework for analysis that recognizes the interlocking nature of identities without centering the most seemingly salient political issues at a given historical moment. Utilizing autoethnography, ethnographic case studies, and theories of identity, Black Queer Identity Matrix provides a framework for understanding the black lesbian through a 'paradigmatic inquiry around the intersections of gender, sexual orientation, and race-ethnicity.'

Although the "Black Queer Identity Matrix" comes out of a communication context, scholars have used the Black Queer Identity Matrix in the context of social justice and equity reform, as well as a framework that highlights the difference between queer theory and queer identity. Howard has used the constructs outlined in Black Queer Identity Matrix to analyze media representations in the show Empire and to challenge homophobia. Howard says in a Huffington Post article, as the author of Black Queer Identity Matrix, a book that deconstructs the matrix in which lesbian and gay people of color live and the strategies employed in negotiating ones sexual identity in public discourse: "I found the reaction of media commentator and political analyst, Dr. Boyce Watkins severely problematic and troubling, especially within the context of a persistent discourse that says the Black community is homophobic." The Atlantic has cited Dr. Howard's work, making a connection between sexual identity, masculinity, and media representation.

- Critical Articulations of Race, Gender and Sexual Orientation (2014) Lexington Books.
- Encyclopedia of Black Comics (2017) Fulcrum Press.

In a feature piece with the Los Angeles Times, writer Jevon Phillips noted some of the controversy around the Encyclopedia of Black Comics, stating, "Like any encyclopedia, though, one of the first things people tend to do is point out what's not in the compilation. Dwayne McDuffie, probably the most influential African American figure in comics and cartoons over the past few decades, was not included in the book. He died in 2011, but it's a notable omission, and there are a few others: William Wilson, the first black independent publisher to list digital comics on iTunes, Percy Carey (the rapper MF Grimm), who was the first black Eisner nominee, and Michael Davis — who could claim a place in the book." In multiple interviews, Howard responded to these critiques reminding the public that this is only volume one and if people want more Black comic creatives to be recognized, they have to support volume one. Howard has said that undertaking the writing of the Encyclopedia of Black Comics was daunting, but she solicited the help of several writers in and out of the comics community to write entries in the book.

== Film ==
In 2018, Howard was featured in an Emmy nominated segment of the show State of the Arts. The segment featured Howard's work in comics and her implementation of comics into the college classroom. The show traced the impact and history of Black comics.
