= Colin Murray Turbayne =

Australian philosopher (1916–2006)

- Born: 7 February 1916; Tannymorel, Australia
- Died: 16 May 2006 (aged 90); Queensland, Australia
- Awards: Guggenheim Fellowship, National Endowment for the Humanities Grant

Education
- Education: University of Queensland; University of Pennsylvania
- Thesis: Constructions Verus Inferences In The Philosophy Of Bertrand Russell (1950)

Philosophical work
- Era: Contemporary philosophy
- Region: Western philosophy
- Main interests: George Berkeley, Epistemology, Metaphysics, Phenomenalism, Conceptual metaphor, Cognitive linguistics
- Notable ideas: The Myth of Metaphor; Visual perception Language model

Colin Murray Turbayne (7 February 1916 – 16 May 2006) was an Australian philosopher and scholar of George Berkeley. He spent most of his thirty-five-year academic career at the University of Rochester and authored The Myth of Metaphor in which he explores the use and abuse of metaphors and conceptual metaphors in language.

== Biography ==
=== Early life ===
Turbayne was born on February 7, 1916, in the rural town of Tannymorel in Queensland, Australia. His father, David Livingston Turbayne, was a banker and his mother, Alice Eva Rene Lahey, was descended from an early pioneer family in Queensland.

Colin received his earliest education at the Church of England Grammar School in Brisbane, where he was both a cricketer and Head Prefect. He completed his Bachelor of Arts degree at the University of Queensland in Brisbane, Australia in 1940 as well as an MA degree in 1946. During World War II he worked for Australian Intelligence in the Pacific War theatre and served as chief of staff for Australian intelligence to Douglas MacArthur in several pacific theatres.

In 1940 he married Ailsa Krimmer and subsequently raised a family of two boys: Ron and John. They remained married for fifty-one years until her death in 1992.

=== Academic studies ===
After emigrating to the United States following the conclusion of World War II in 1947, he undertook graduate studies at the University of Pennsylvania. In 1950 he earned both his MA and PhD degrees in philosophy from the University of Pennsylvania.

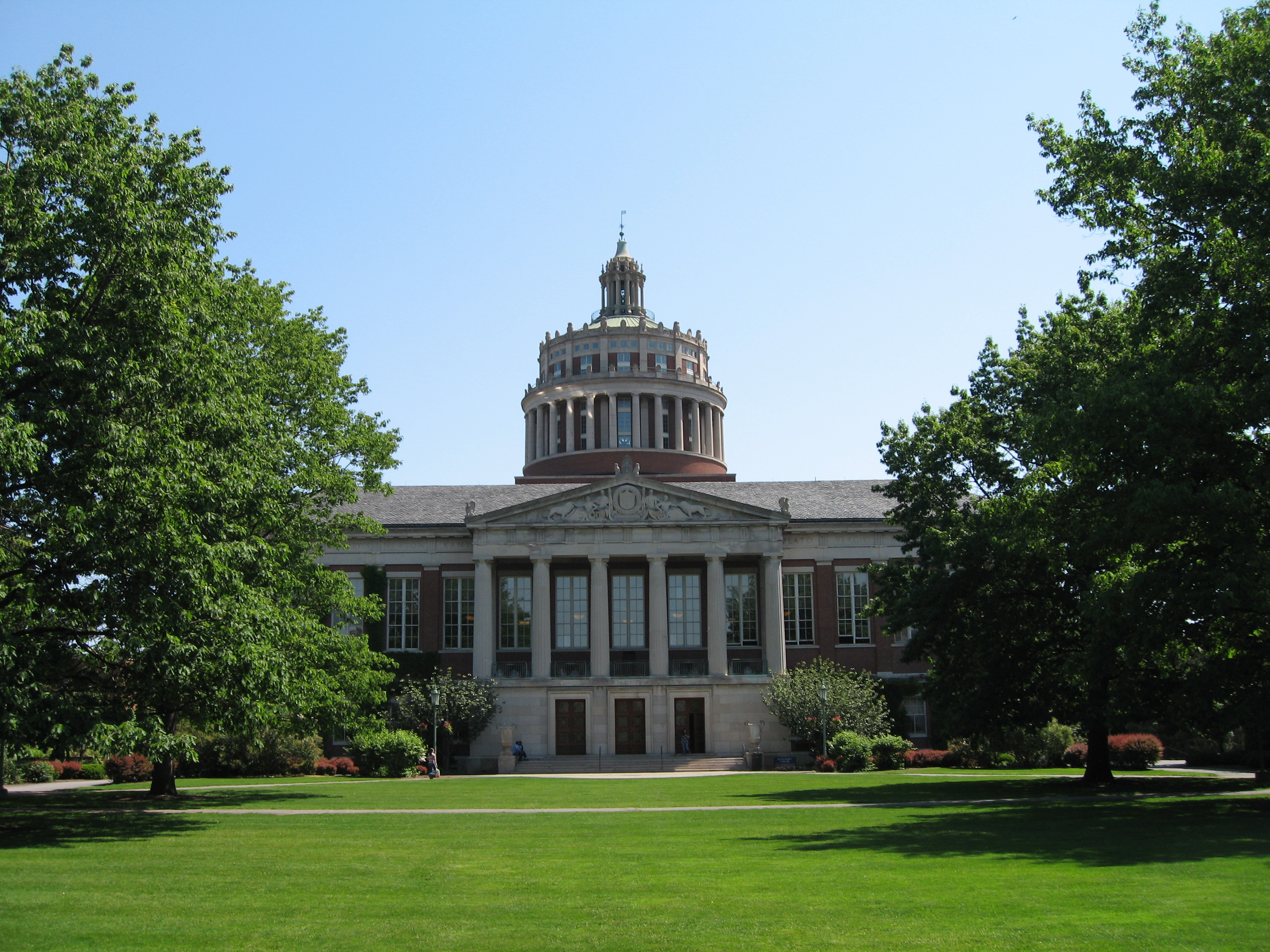
The Rush Rhees Library at University of Rochester

His PhD dissertation at the University of Pennsylvania Constructions Versus Inferences in the Philosophy of Bertrand Russell focused on the philosophical works of the British philosopher and logician Bertrand Russell (1950). His MA dissertation at the University of Queensland focused on Berkeley's philosophy as embodied in his Commonplace book (1947).

Following the completion of his advanced studies, Turbayne acquired his first academic post as an assistant professor of philosophy at the University of Washington. He remained on the faculty from 1950 until 1955. Subsequently, he served as an assistant professor of speech at the University of California at Berkley from 1955 until 1957. Soon thereafter, he was appointed as an associate professor of philosophy at the University of Rochester in 1957. A short time later in 1962, he was promoted to professor of philosophy and continued to teach at the University of Rochester until his appointment to professor emeritus in 1981.

=== Academic works ===
In addition to serving as a lecturer, Turbayne was a noted authority and researcher on the philosophical insights of George Berkeley. Over the years, he edited several of Berkeley's works and essays, while helping to sustain interest in Berkeley's works during the mid twentieth century. In addition, he was the first commentator to recognize the central importance of metaphor in the philosophy of Berkeley. He is best known for his book The Myth of Metaphor. A critical reviewer described the work as a "welcome addition to the analysis of metaphorical language". Turbayne was assisted by several of his colleagues at the University of Rochester in this work including: Lewis White Beck and W. Albert Noyes, Jr.

==== The Myth of Metaphor ====
In his book The Myth of Metaphor, Turbayne argues that metaphor would necessarily occur in any language that could ever claim to embody richness and depth of understanding. In addition, he provides a critical analysis of the simplistic Cartesian and Newtonian depictions of the universe as little more than a "machine", a concept that underlies much of the scientific materialism which prevails in the modern Western world. He also provides evidence that the philosophical concept of "material substance" or "substratum" has limited meaning at best and that modern man has unknowingly fallen victim to an unnecessary literal interpretation of one of many potentially beneficial metaphorical models of the universe.

With this in mind, Turbayne argues that one can identify at least three instances of sort-crossing in which both René Descartes and Isaac Newton became victimized by metaphors which they incorporated into their scientific methodology while attempting to explain the natural world within the context of a mechanistic philosophy. In the first example, Turbayne notes that both men rely upon the certainty of the use of deduction while demonstrating the relationship between principles and theorems in their respective methodologies. This necessary relationship is then inexplicably exported, however, from their process of explaining the natural world into the physical world itself under the guise of "active principles", which generate a necessary causal chain of events. In Turbayne's view, this confusion amounts to a '"procedure-process shift" which transpires in accordance with the linguistic Principle of Association. This principle describes an evolutionary process through which those things which are observed to "go-together" subsequently suggest each other, acquire the same names and finally are thought of as being the same or examples of the same sort. As a result of this confusion, the natural world suddenly obeys the logic of the deductive methodology utilized by both philosophers.

In his second example of sort-crossing, Turbayne clarifies the manner in which both Descartes and Newton unknowingly equate all explanation with physical explanation and ultimately with causality explanation. It is apparent from Decartes' Three Natural Laws and Newton's Three Laws of Motion, that both philosophers bifurcated the natural world into "effects" and "causes". The former consist of "bodies at rest" or "bodies in motion" while the latter consist of "resistance", "gravity" or "attraction". Turbayne argues that both philosophers mistakenly concluded that any deductive explanation of the natural world must first be founded upon a causal relationship between these different sorts. For Descartes, the explanation rests with causal laws while for Newton, the explanation rests with causal forces which are embedded within natural events. Yet investigations by both philosophers failed to uncover direct evidence of such "active forces" or "active principles" as required by their own respective scientific methodologies. Turbaye argues that by ascribing such forces to bodies in the external natural world both Descartes and Newton have fallen victim to a form of "hylopsychism" by unknowingly assigning a property which we observe only in ourselves as living beings into the external natural world.

External images
- Photograph of Colin M. Turbayne in his memoriam by Paul J. Olscamp Here on fsu.edu
- Photograph of Colin Murray Turbayne at the University of Rochester in 1965 Here on gf.org

In his final example of sort-crossing, Turbayne calls attention to the apriori identification made by both Descartes and Newton of the term deduction with the term calculation or with any other form of reckoning in general. In Turbayne's view, both philosophers are correct in asserting that one of the defining characteristics of the scientific methodology is a reliance upon the use of synthesis in demonstrations. Their error lies, however, in embracing a view of the scientific method which is far too narrow by relying exclusively upon the use of mathematical terms within the process. While mathematical computations, differential equations or the study of geometric lines may indeed prove beneficial within the scientific method, one must avoid the temptation to call upon them to serve as the sole defining featuring of the process itself to the exclusion of alternate terms of explanation.

Another central theme of The Myth of Metaphor is Turbayne's analysis of Berkelely's theory of vision and his theory of space as compared to Newtonian mechanics. Turbayne demonstrates that Berkeley's "language metaphor" provides a more convincing explanation of various natural phenomena and optical illusions including the Barrovian case, the case of the horizontal moon, and the case of the inverted retinal image.

Turbayne also provides a detailed review of Berkeley's effort to dispel the confusing use of metaphorical language in the description of the mind and in the description of ideas in general through the misuse of hypotheses that were initially developed to explain such occurrences in the physical world. As a result, Turbayne has been described as one of the leading interpreters of Berkeley's theories of vision and relative motion as well as Berkeley's relationship to both Kant and Hume.

In the final analysis, Turbayne's primary interest in The Myth of Metaphor resembles, "what Socrates did in the Phaedo in his rejoinder to the argument of Cebes...[who] was enthralled by that wisdom called Physical Science and was "completely blinded" by these studies." Like Socrates, Turbayne strives to "unmask" the metaphysics embodied within the mechanism philosophy by cautioning his readers to avoid dogmatically equating "explanation" with "mechanical explanation" or "cause" with "physical cause" in general. By recognizing the metaphorical nature of such explanations, they are more likely to attain the virtue of philosophical wisdom, which is necessary to the development of more useful metaphorical models of the natural world.

==== Metaphors for the Mind ====
In his final book, Metaphors for the Mind: The Creative Mind and Its Origins (1991), Turbayne illustrates the manner in which historical traditions in philosophical thought have contributed to accepted modern theories of human thought in general and theories of language in particular. Turbayne provides a review of the early philosophical writings of both Plato and Aristotle, while illustrating the manner in which Platonic metaphors have influenced the works of both Berkeley and Immanuel Kant. In addition, he demonstrates the manner in which Plato's procreation model as outlined within his Timaeus has influenced modern theories of thought and language. He concludes by attempting to restore the original model which describes a mind in which both the female and male hemispheres function in concert to participate in the act of creation. A critical reviewer of the book noted that it contains interesting material which is likely to both provoke and surprise its readers. In addition, it has been described as presenting a contribution to the modern philosophical debate concerning relativism and philosophical realism.

==== "Berkeley's Two Concepts of Mind" ====
In this essay, Turbayne advances the thesis that Berkeley diplomatically upheld two different theories of the mind, the first of which he describes as an "official theory" intended for public presentation and the second which was confined to his private thoughts. As evidence, Turbayne points to the final pages of Berkeley's personal notebook Philosophical Commentaries. Here Berkeley provides clues that he may abandon the concept of a universal "thinking substance, something unknown" (687) or "the substance of Spirit we do not know, it not being knowable" (701). As Turbayne notes, Berkeley publicly embraced several doctrines which are compatible with Christian theology in an effort "to use utmost caution not to give the least handle of offense to the Church or Church-men (715)." In this view, Berkeley's public defense of the terms "mental substance" and God was intended to be interpreted purely in a metaphorical sense rather than as a literal expression of his private philosophical beliefs. In short, "Berkeley had a purely substantivalist conception of the mind, confirmed by his private utterances."

=== Philosophy ===
Turbayne has been described as being convinced of phenomenalism, as well as being skeptical of the validity of materialism. In addition, he has been cited as supporting the view that metaphors are properly characterized as "categorical mistakes" that may lead an unsuspecting user to considerable obfuscation of thought.

=== Berkeley Prize ===
In the early 1990s, Colin M. Turbayne and his wife established an International Berkeley Essay Prize competition in cooperation with the Philosophy Department at the University of Rochester in order to encourage continued research into Berkeley's works by aspiring young scholars.

Notable students of Colin Murray Turbayne include Paul J. Olscamp, President Emeritus Bowling Green State University and Western Washington University.

=== Honours ===
During his academic career, Turbayne was a Fulbright Fellow in 1963 as well as the recipient of a Guggenheim Fellowship in 1965 In 1959 and 1966, he was the recipient of grants from the American Council of Learned Societies for his contributions to their project on the linguistic structure of the mind. In 1979, he was honored as a senior fellow by the National Endowment for the Humanities (NEH). In addition, he was the recipient of an Honorary Doctorate in Humane Letters at Bowling Green State University. He was cited in Marquis' Who's Who in the World, 1982-1983. as well as Who was Who in America in 2010.

Turbayne's philosophical lectures at the University of Rochester were often punctuated with illustrative re-enactments of scenes from Shakespearian drama to illustrate his arguments. It was not at all unusual for him to appear before his students at lectures dressed in cloak and dagger quoting the moving scene from MacBeth: "Is this a dagger that I see before me..?" in order to illustrate the use of metaphor. He was considered a master Socratic interrogator who gently guided his students to the proper conclusion. He was also noted for his skillful use of the reductio ad absurdum in his lectures. Standing ovations from his students were commonplace throughout his long tenure at the university.

=== Death ===
Colin Murray Turbayne died on May 16, 2006, in Queensland, Australia at the age of 90. He was survived by his two sons and two grandchilden.

== Publications ==
- You may read selected publications by Colin Murray Turbayne; Here on Archive.org

- You may read Turbayne's "Berkeley's Two Concepts of Mind" (1959); Here on JSTOR.org

- You may read Turbayne's "The Myth of Metaphor" (1962); Here on hathitrust.org

=== Texts ===
Included among Colin Murray Turbayne's publications are the following texts:

- Three Dialogues between Hylas and Philonous by George Berkeley, Editor Colin Murray Turbayne (1954)
- A Treatise Concerning the Principles of Human Knowledge by George Berkeley, Editor Colin Murray Turbayne (1957)
- The Myth of Metaphor by Colin Murray Turbayne, with forewords by Morse Peckham and Foster Tait and appendix by Rolf Eberle. Columbia, S. C: University of South Carolina Press, 1970. Rev. of 1962 ed. Spanish ed., Fondo de Cultura Economica, Mexico, 1974. Reviewed by Paul J. Olscamp "The Philosophical Importance of С. M. Turbayne's The Myth of Metaphor." International Philosophical Quarterly 6 (1966): 110–31.
- Works on Vision by George Berkeley, Ed. Colin Murray Turbayne (1963)
- Principles, Dialogues and Philosophical Correspondence by George Berkeley, Ed. Colin Murray Turbayne (1965)
- Berkeley: Principles of Human Knowledge, Text and Critical Essays Ed. Colin Murray Turbayne (1970).
  Reviewed by G. P. Conroy. Journal of the History of Philosophy 9 (1971): 510–12; J. M. Beyssade. Études philosophiques 4 (1970):523-26.
- Berkeley: Critical and Interpretive Essays, Ed. Colin Murray Turbayne (1982)
- Metaphors for the Mind: The Creative Mind and its Origins by Colin Murray Turbayne, (1991)

=== Journal articles ===
Selected peer-reviewed articles published by Colin Murray Turbayne include:

- "Berkeley and Russell on Space". Dialectica (1954):210-227
- "Kant's Refutation of Dogmatic Idealism". The Philosophical Quarterly (1955):225-224
- "The Influence of Berkeley's Science on his Metaphysics". Philosophy and Phenomenological Research (1956):476-87
- "Grosseteste and an Ancient Optical Principle". Isis (1959):467-72.
- "Berkeley's Two Concepts of Mind". Philosophy and Phenomenological Research(1959):85-92 In this collection of essays, Turbayne's work comprised two papers that had been published in Philosophy and Phenomenological Research:
  - "Berkeley's Two Concepts of Mind"
  - Grave, S. A. (1962). "A Note on Berkeley's Conception of the Mind". Philosophy and Phenomenological Research. 22 (4): 574–576. doi:10.2307/2105263. JSTOR 2105263.
- "A Bibliography of George Berkeley, 1933-1962". The Journal of Philosophy (1963):93-112
- "The Origin of Berkeley's Paradoxes". In Steinkraus, Warren E., ed. New Studies in Berkeley's Philosophy. New York: Holt, Rinehart and Winston, 1966. Foreword by Brand Blanshard. pp. 31–42.
- "Visual Language From the Verbal Model". Journal of Typographical Research (1969):345-370
- "Berkeley's Metaphysical Grammar". In Turbayne, Colin Murray. Berkeley, Principles ... Text and Critical Essays(1970).pp. 3–36.
- "Visual Language". ECT (1971):51-58
- "A Bibliography of George Berkeley, 1963-1974" Journal of the History of Philosophy (1977):83-95.
- "Lending Philonous a Hand: The Berkeley, Plato, Aristotle Connection". In Turbayne, Colin Murray, ed. Berkeley: Critical and Interpretive Essays. Minneapolis, 1982 pp. 295–310.
- "A Bibliography of George Berkeley 1963-1979". In Turbayne, Colin Murray, ed. Berkeley: Critical and Interpretive Essays. Manchester, 1982 pp. 313–329
- "Hume's influence on Berkeley". Revue Internationale de Philosophie (1985):259-269

== Professional affiliations ==
Colin Murray Turbayne was an active member of both the American Philosophical Association as well as the American Association of University Professors.

== See also ==
George Berkeley
Metaphysics
Epistemology
Philosophy of Language

Conceptual metaphor
Mind-Body Dualism
Naturalism
Catachresis
