= Paul J. Olscamp =

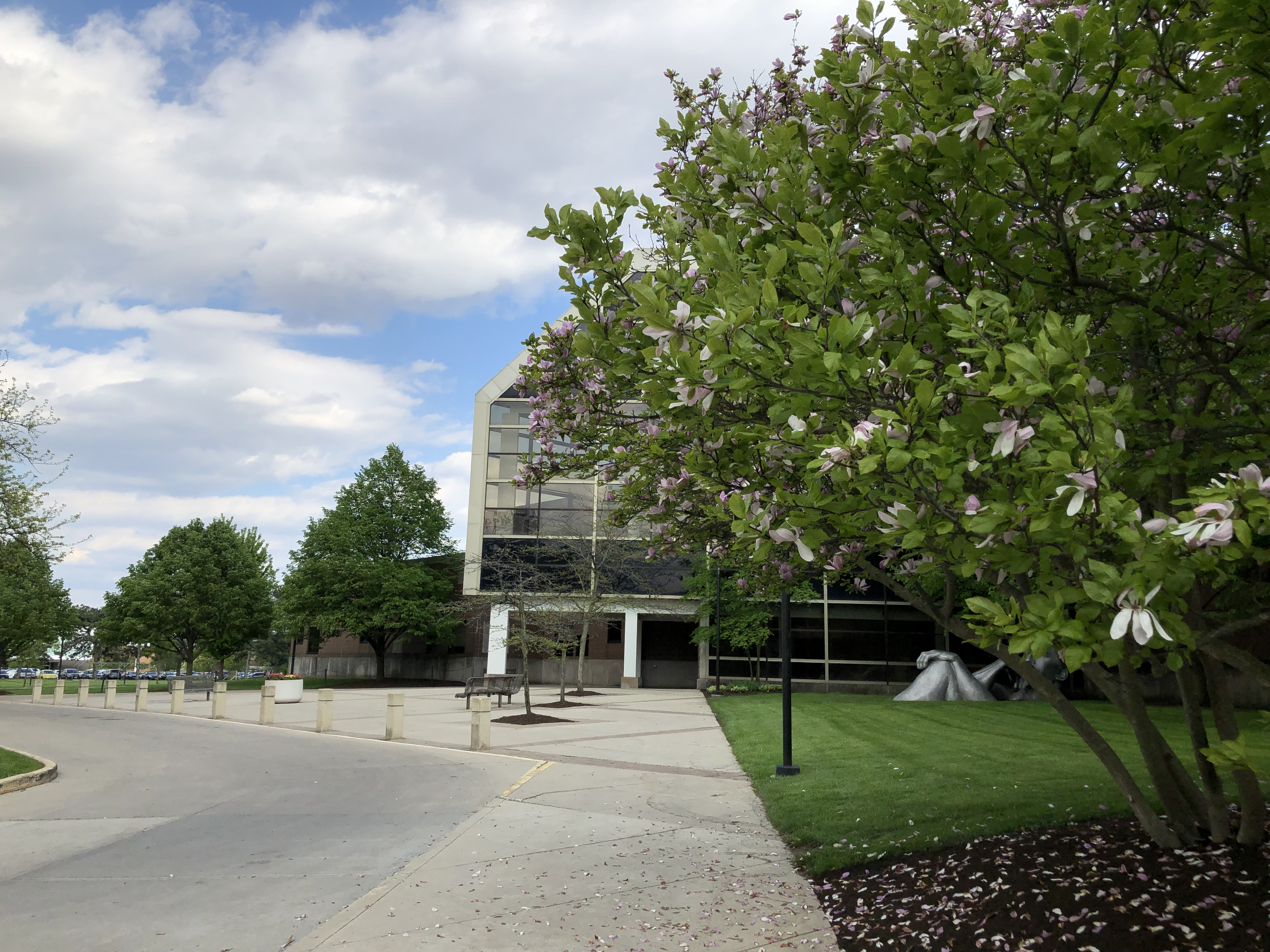
Olscamp Hall at Bowling Green State University was named after Paul J. Olscamp

Paul J. Olscamp (August 29, 1937 – October 14, 2014) was a Canadian-American academic and university administrator, born in Montreal, Quebec. While attending the University of Western Ontario, Olscamp was a member of the Delta Upsilon fraternity. He received his Bachelor of Arts and Master of Arts degrees in 1958 and 1960, respectively. He received his doctorate in philosophy from the University of Rochester in 1962, the first such degree awarded there. His continuing love of the subject was evident during his time at Bowling Green State University (BGSU) because he taught a philosophy course almost every semester, despite managing all his duties as president. While studying at the University of Rochester, Olscamp was a student of Colin Murray Turbayne.

He served as Dean of Faculties at Roosevelt University, Chicago, Illinois, from 1970 to 1972. He also taught one course each semester, including seminars on the philosophy of George Berkeley.

Olscamp served as president of Western Washington University for seven years, from 1975 to 1982. While president of BGSU, he held a position on the board of directors of the American Association of State Colleges and Universities. He was appointed to the National Council on the Humanities by President Ronald Reagan in 1987. In 1989 he was elected as the Mid-American Conference representative to the National Collegiate Athletic Association's Presidents' Commission. Following his retirement from BGSU in 1995, Dr. Olscamp served as interim president of the University of South Dakota and then went on to hold the same position at Mayville State University in North Dakota. He died at the age of 77 on October 14, 2014, in Coeur d'Alene, Idaho.

== Publications ==
=== Books ===
External videos
- You may read Paul J. Olscamp's "The Moral Philosophy of George Berkeley" (1970) Here on archive.org

- The Moral Philosophy of George Berkeley(1970)
- An Introduction to Philosophy (1971)
- Moral Leadership: Ethics and the College Presidency (2003)

=== Translations ===
- Descartes' Discourse on Method, Optics, Geometry and Meteorology (1965)

Academic offices
Preceded by Hollis A. Moore	President of Bowling Green State University; 1982-1995	Succeeded by Sidney A. Ribeau
