= Ben Vinson III =

American historian and academic administrator

Ben Vinson
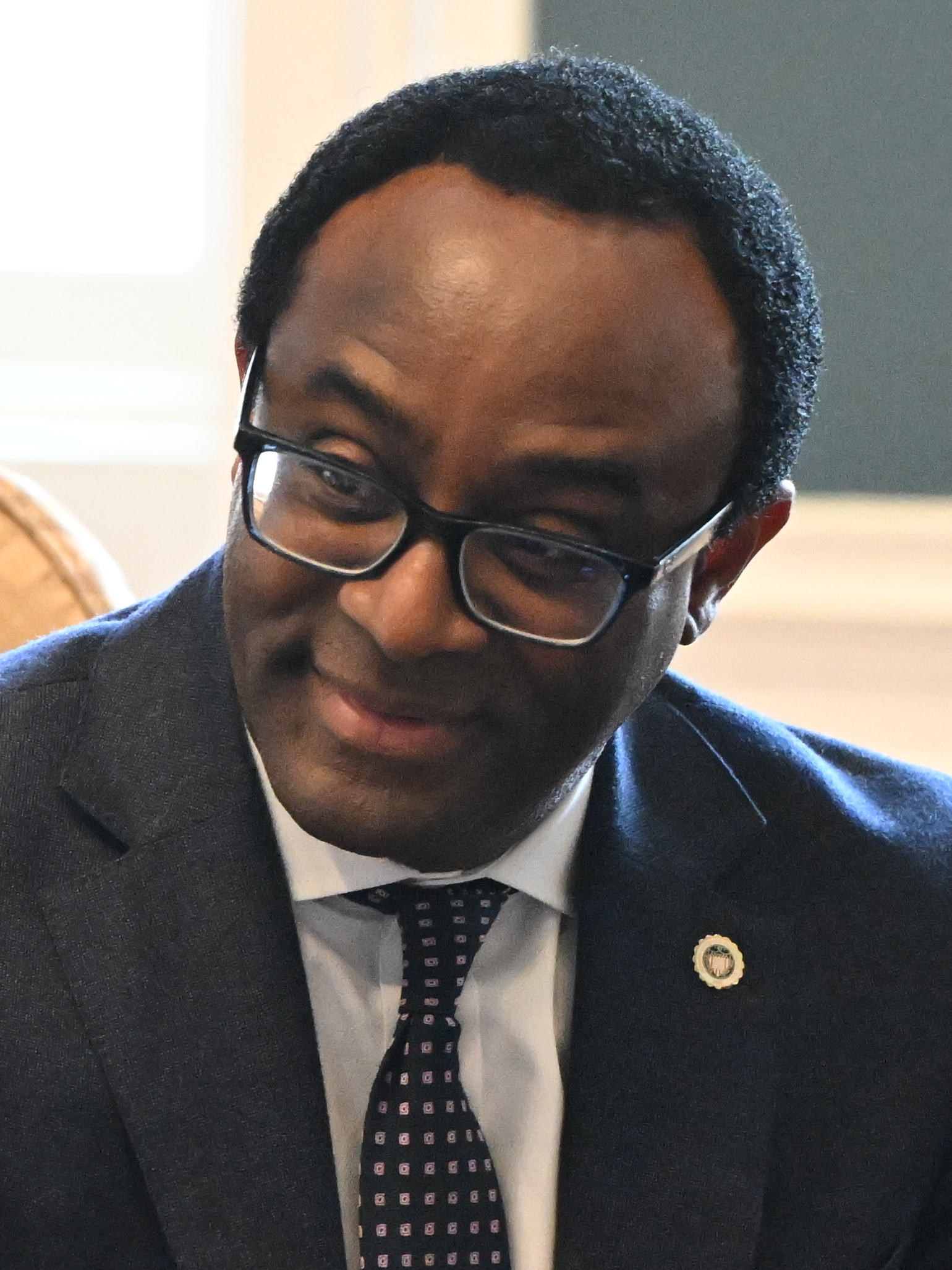
- Vinson in 2025

18th President of Howard University
- In office September 1, 2023 – August 31, 2025
- Preceded by: Wayne A. I. Frederick
- Succeeded by: Wayne A. I. Frederick (acting)

Personal details
- Born: 1969 or 1970 (age 55–56) Rapid City, South Dakota, U.S.
- Spouse: Yolanda Fortenberry
- Education: Dartmouth College (BA); Columbia University (MA, PhD)
- Scientific career
- Fields: Latin American history Black history
- Workplaces: Barnard College; Pennsylvania State University; Johns Hopkins University; George Washington University; Howard University
- Thesis: Bearing Arms for His Majesty: The Free-Colored Militia in Colonial Mexico (1998)
- Doctoral advisor: Herbert S. Klein

Ben Vinson III is an American historian who served as the 18th president of Howard University from 2023 to 2025. He previously served as provost of Case Western Reserve University from 2018 to 2023 and as dean of the Columbian College of Arts and Sciences at George Washington University from 2013 to 2018.

== Biography ==
=== Early life and education ===
Vinson is originally from Rapid City, South Dakota, and spent part of his childhood on military bases in Italy. His father was a master sergeant in the United States Air Force, and his mother was an elementary school teacher. He attended Bishop Ireton High School in Alexandria, Virginia, and graduated in 1988. He received his undergraduate degree summa cum laude from Dartmouth College in 1992, having double majored in classics and history. Although he had initially planned to become a lawyer, Vinson chose to apply to a doctoral program in history after earning a Mellon-Mays Undergraduate Fellowship, which he used to fund research on Afro-Latin festival culture in Venezuela. Vinson earned a Ph.D. from Columbia University in 1998.

=== Career ===
Vinson served on the faculties of Barnard College and Pennsylvania State University before joining Johns Hopkins University as a professor of history and served as the Herbert Baxter Adams Professor of Latin American History and vice dean of centers, interdisciplinary studies and graduate education. He also helped found Johns Hopkins' Center for Africana Studies and served as its founding director.

In 2013, Vinson was appointed as dean of George Washington University's Columbian College of Arts and Sciences. As dean of GWU's Columbian College, he led the integration of the Corcoran School of the Arts and Design into the college and opened a $275 million interdisciplinary science and engineering building. He also spearheaded diversity initiatives including the Cisneros Hispanic Leadership Institute that provides funding for high school juniors from their undergraduate to post-doctoral studies.

=== Reception ===
Vinson has been chairman of the board of the National Humanities Center since 2018. He is also a vice president of the American Historical Association and president of the Conference on Latin American History.

Vinson's scholarship focused on the African presence in colonial Mexico and has authored books on the African American experiences in Mexico and Afro-Mexican experiences in the United States. His book Before Mestizaje: The Frontiers of Race and Caste in Colonial Mexico, won the 2019 Howard Cline Book Prize in Mexican History for the best work on Mexico by the Latin American Studies Association.

== Personal ==
A resident of Northeast Ohio, Vinson is married to Dr Yolanda M. Fortenberry. He has three children, Allyson, Ben IV, and Brandon Antonio Vinson. Two of his cousins are W. Toni Carter, former county commissioner of Ramsey County, Minnesota, and her son, Melvin Carter III, the first Black mayor of Saint Paul, Minnesota.

== Bibliography ==
- Before Mestizaje: The Frontiers of Race and Caste in Colonial Mexico (2017)
