= Mary Ellen Mazey =

President of Bowling Green State University
- In office July 1, 2011 – December 2017
- Preceded by: Carol Cartwright
- Succeeded by: Rodney K. Rogers

Personal details
- Born: February 22, 1949 (age 77)

Mary Ellen Mazey (born February 22, 1949) is an American academic who is President Emeritus of Bowling Green State University.

== Career ==
Mazey served as Provost and Vice President of Academic Affairs at Auburn University, as Dean of the Eberly College of Arts and Sciences at West Virginia University, and as Dean of the College of Liberal Arts at Wright State University. In 1996-1997, Mazey was the appointed Director of the Office of University Partnerships for the U.S. Department of Housing and Urban Development (HUD). In that capacity, she had oversight of HUD's $25 million in grant programs to colleges and universities across the country. In addition, she served as HUD's liaison to higher educational associations, other federal agencies, and colleges and universities. Mazey has served as a grants reviewer and consultant to HUD and the U.S. Department of Education in addition to being a consultant to the Appalachian Regional Commission and numerous local governments, colleges and universities. A first-generation college graduate, Mazey earned bachelor's and master's degrees from West Virginia University and a Ph.D. in geography from the University of Cincinnati.

Mazey has served as a consultant on strategic planning and as an evaluator for the Higher Learning Commission. She chaired and led the board of the Western Collegiate Hockey Association and the Mid-American Conference Council of Presidents. In addition, she served on the board of directors of the Ohio Inter-University Council, Toledo Chamber of Commerce and the Northwest Ohio Regional Growth Partnership.

Mazey announced that she would step down as BGSU president at the end of 2017. In recognition of her passion, innovation and leadership for the University, the BGSU Board of Trustees granted her the title of President Emeritus in December 2017.

Academic offices
Preceded by Carol Cartwright	President of Bowling Green State University; 2011-2017	Succeeded by Rodney Rodgers
