= Voices of the Self =

Book by Keith Gilyard

- Author: Keith Gilyard
- Language: English
- Genre: Non-fiction
- Publication date: 1991

Voices of the Self: A Study of Language Competence was written and published in 1991 by Keith Gilyard. Gilyard's autoethnography portrays his life as a student in the American public school system during childhood and adolescence. The chapters vary between narrative stories of how Gilyard communicates in different social situations and scholastic analyses of those experiences.

One of the major themes of the autoethnography is that, as Gilyard explains, African-American males in the public school system have difficulties developing a strong sense of self because of the inherent contradictory in-school and out-of-school literacy practices in which African-Americans participate. Following a model similar to James Paul Gee's "specialist varieties of language", Gilyard explains the various sociocultural factors that influenced his decisions to use certain varieties or dialects of language depending on the context of individual situations.

The book progresses with abrupt changes between chapters written as Gilyard the academic scholar (written in a style that highlights the aspects of what Gilyard refers to as "Standard English" and Gilyard the African American male (written in a style that highlights the aspects of "Black English"). Gilyard refers to this transition as "bidialectalism", or the ability to code-switch depending on specific social situations. As Gilyard explains, this ability to alter his dialect provided Gilyard with unique opportunities for success.

== Major themes ==
Standard English competence
Standard English, a term that comes with a long history of debate, is generally understood by linguistic and literacy researchers as the language variety emphasized by the American public school system as the acceptable dialectical version of the English language. However, Gilyard argues that because students bring diverse literacy and language practices with them from their home environment, and specifically, African-American students bring "Black English" into schools and thus are forced to change their language and assimilate to the "Standard English" of public schools, African-American students have a harder time being successful than their white peers.

Code switching
Pointing to two scholarly sources, Gilyard explains that code-switching is "the ability to move back and forth among languages, dialects, and registers with ease, as demanded by the social situation" and that it is also a "strategy by which the skillful speaker uses his knowledge of how language choices are interpreted in his community to structure the interaction so as to maximize outcomes favorable to himself".

Impression management

Language identity

Eradicationism vs. pluralism vs. bidialectalism
