= Newtonianism =

Philosophical principle of applying Newton's methods in a variety of fields

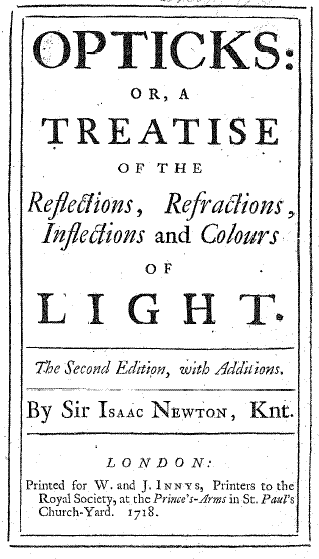
Title page of Isaac Newton's Opticks

Newtonianism is a philosophical and scientific doctrine inspired by the beliefs and methods of natural philosopher Isaac Newton. While Newton's influential contributions were primarily in physics and mathematics, his broad conception of the universe as being governed by rational and understandable laws laid the foundation for many strands of Enlightenment thought. Newtonianism became an influential intellectual program that applied Newton's principles in many avenues of inquiry, laying the groundwork for modern science (both the natural and social sciences), in addition to influencing philosophy, political thought and theology.

== Background ==
Newton's Principia Mathematica, published by the Royal Society in 1687 but not available widely and in English until after his death, is the text generally cited as revolutionary or otherwise radical in the development of science. The three books of Principia, considered a seminal text in mathematics and physics, are notable for their rejection of hypotheses in favor of inductive and deductive reasoning based on a set of definitions and axioms. This method may be contrasted to the Cartesian method of deduction based on sequential logical reasoning, and showed the efficacy of applying mathematical analysis as a means of making discoveries about the natural world.

Newton's other seminal work was Opticks, printed in 1704 in Philosophical Transactions of the Royal Society, of which he became president in 1703. The treatise, which features his now famous work on the composition and dispersion of sunlight, is often cited as an example of how to analyze difficult questions via quantitative experimentation. Even so, the work was not considered revolutionary in Newton's time. One hundred years later, however, Thomas Young would describe Newton's observations in Opticks as "yet unrivalled... they only rise in our estimation as we compare them with later attempts to improve on them."

== Mathematical philosophy ==
The first edition of Principia features proposals about the movements of celestial bodies which Newton initially calls "hypotheses"—however, by the second edition, the word "hypothesis" was replaced by the word "rule", and Newton had added to the footnotes the following statement:

... I frame no hypotheses. For whatever is not deduced from the phenomena is to be called a hypothesis; and hypotheses, whether metaphysical or physical, whether of occult qualities or mechanical, have no place in experimental philosophy.

Newton's work and the philosophy that enshrines it are based on mathematical empiricism, which is the idea that mathematical and physical laws may be revealed in the real world via experimentation and observation. However, Newton's empiricism is balanced against an adherence to an exact mathematical system, and that in many cases the "observed phenomena" upon which Newton built his theories were actually based on mathematical models, which were representative but not identical to the natural phenomena they described.

Newtonian doctrine can be contrasted with several alternative sets of principles and methods such as Cartesianism, Leibnizianism and Wolffianism.

== Newton's other beliefs ==
Newton was deeply religious and believed in the literal truth of Scripture, taking the story of Genesis to be Moses' eyewitness account of the creation of the Solar System. Newton reconciled his beliefs by adopting the idea that the Christian God set in place at the beginning of time the "mechanical" laws of nature, but retained the power to enter and alter that mechanism at any time.

Newton further believed that the preservation of nature was in itself an act of God, stating that "a continual miracle is needed to prevent the Sun and fixed stars from rushing together through Gravity".

== Popularization ==
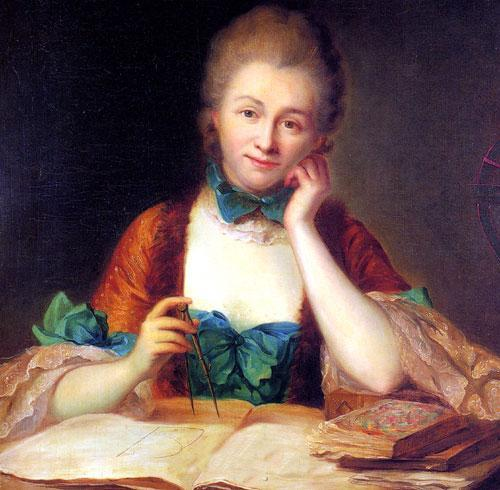
Portrait of French physicist and Newtonian Émilie du Châtelet

Between 1726 and 1729, French author, philosopher, and historian Voltaire was exiled in England, where he met several English scholars and devotees to the Newtonian system of thought. Voltaire would later bring these ideas back to France with his publication of Lettres Philosophiques and Philosophie de Newton, which popularized Newton's intellectual practices and general philosophy. Later, prominent natural philosopher and friend of Voltaire, Émilie du Châtelet, would publish a French translation of Principia, which met with great success in France.

While Newton was opposed by some members of the religious community for his non-Trinitarian beliefs about God, others believed science itself to be a philosophical exercise, that if done correctly, would lead its practitioners to a greater knowledge and appreciation of God.

In 1737, Italian scholar Count Francesco Algarotti published a book entitled Newtonianismo per le dame overro dialoghi sopre la luce e i colori, which aimed to introduce female audiences to the work of Newton. The text explained the principles of Newton's Opticks while avoiding much of the mathematical rigor of the work in favor of a more "agreeable" text. The book was later published with a title that made no reference to women, leading some to believe that the female branding of the book was a ploy to avoid censorship.

== Influence on other scholars ==
Scottish philosopher David Hume, likely inspired by the methods of analysis and synthesis which Newton developed in Opticks, was a strong adherent of Newtonian empiricism in his studies of moral phenomena.

Newton and his philosophy of Newtonianism arguably led to the popularization of science in Europe—particularly in England, France, and Germany—catalyzing the Age of Enlightenment.

== Criticism ==
In modern times, the philosopher Colin Murray Turbayne raised doubts concerning Newton's adherence to his own "scientific methodology" while developing a mechanistic natural philosophy. As Turbayne notes, the context of Newton's rejection of the use of hypotheses per se is clarified within his rules of methodology at the conclusion of his Opticks. where he asserts that "hypotheses are not to be regarded in experimental philosophy....By this way of analysis we may proceed....from effects to their causes....And the synthesis consists in assuming the causes discovered and established as principles, and by them explaining the phenomena proceeding from them and proving the explanations". .

In short, Turbayne notes that Newton clearly advocates against the use of synthesis by an axiomatic methodology prior to the use of induction to derive axioms based upon experience. This constitutes a succinct repudiation of Descartes's reliance upon intuition or the "light of reason" within his "way of hypothesis" where he calls for synthesis without previous analysis. Newton's assertion that "Hypotheses non fingo" is therefore a cryptic way of indicating that all of his first principles serve as conjectures, which are merely assumed to be true at the start of a scientific inquiry. They are therefore derived from experimental observation before any deductions can be formulated at the conclusion of the scientific methodology. in Newton's own words, "The main business of natural philosophy is to argue from phenomena without feigning hypotheses, and to deduce causes from effects till we come to the very first cause which is certainly is not mechanical.".

As Turbayne notes, it is clear that Newton incorporated the use of the powerful deductive procedure developed by the Greek Euclidean geometers so as to form "propositions in the mathematical way." In accordance with this procedure, all principles and theorems developed using this methodology are "necessarily connected" as outlined in the rules of logical reasoning. Curiously, however, Newton took the additional step of asserting that this "necessary relationship" prevails not merely in the relationship of the principles and theorems which he developed, but within the nature of the phenomena he was attempting to explain in the natural world itself. Suddenly, a defining feature of Newton's deductive argument is inexplicably incorporated into the phenomena of the natural world itself. Despite the absence of direct experimental observation evidence, Newton now claims that active laws necessarily produce effects within the natural world. As Turbayne observes, the result of this astounding assertion is Newton's conclusion that "nature ...obeys the logic of the deductive method.".
