= Michael Leonard Hecht =

New Orleans based American economic developer and businessman

Michael Hecht
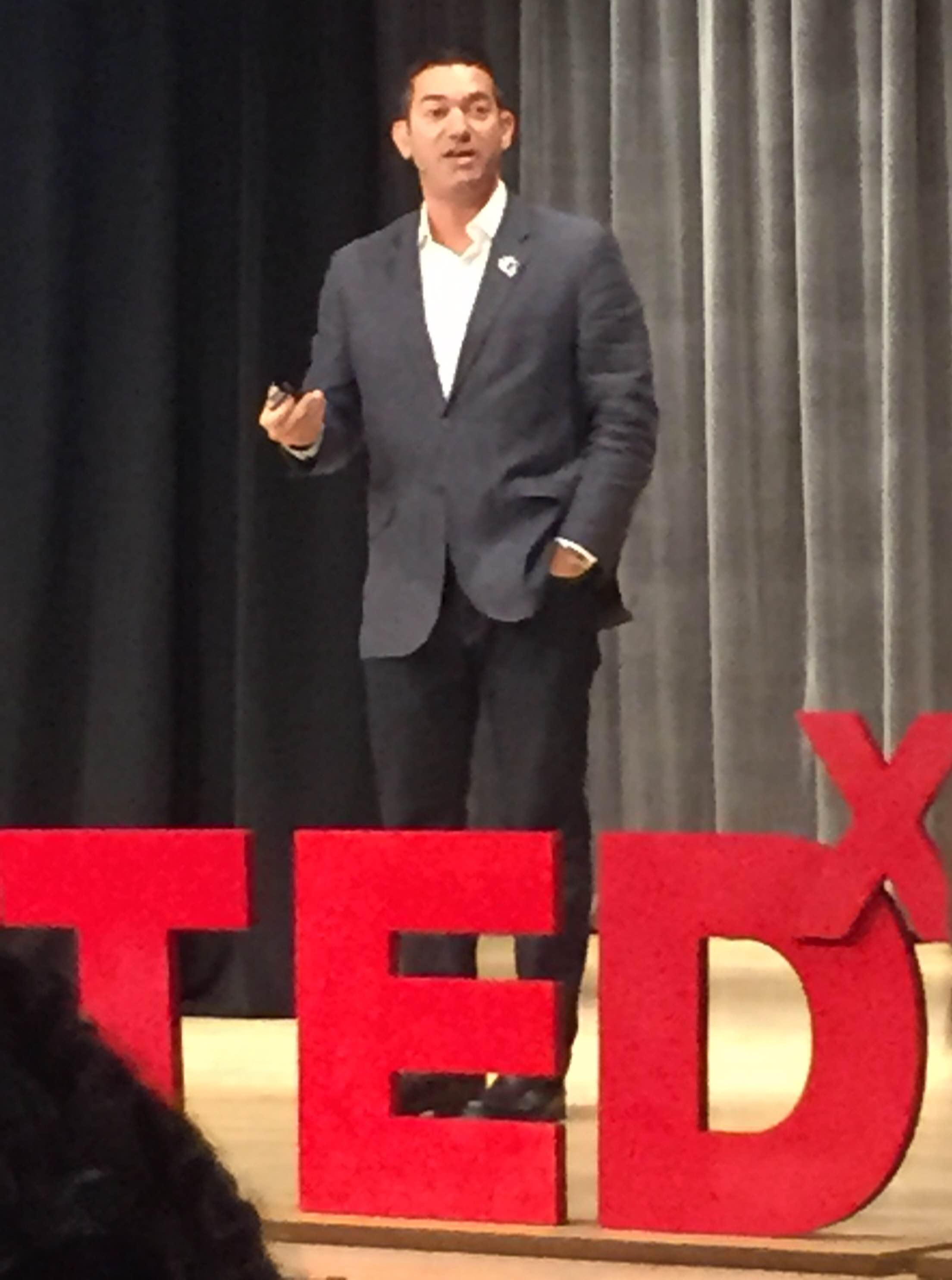
- Hecht, 2015
- Born: August 31, 1970 (age 56); New York City, New York, US
- Education: Yale University, '92, Stanford University, '98 MBA
- Occupation: Economic Developer
- Spouse: Marlene Friis
- Children: 2

Michael Leonard Hecht (born August 31, 1970) is an American economic developer and businessman based in New Orleans, who is currently President & CEO of Greater New Orleans, Inc, the post-Hurricane Katrina economic development organization for the New Orleans region. Hecht previously led the post-Katrina Business Recovery Program for the State of Louisiana and the post-9/11 Small Business Assistance Program for New York City.

== Early life and education ==
Hecht grew up in White Plains, New York. He went to Yale University, where he created a self-designed major in Race Relations, consisting of study in Sociology, Economics and African-American Studies, and later attended Stanford Business School, where he received his MBA in 1998.

== Career ==
After graduating Yale, Hecht went to work for Marakon Associates, a financial and strategic management consultancy. At Marakon, Hecht worked for Fortune 100 companies in the US, Canada, Australia and Europe, including Coca-Cola, IBM and Kellogg. While in business school, Hecht and a partner started Variety Lights Development, a hospitality development and management company in San Francisco. Of three properties opened, their most successful was Foreign Cinema, which opened in August 1999.

In 2003, Hecht joined the administration of Mayor Michael Bloomberg, to develop and manage a post 9/11 recovery program for small businesses. As an Assistant Commissioner at the NYC Department of Small Business Services, Hecht opened Business Solution Centers around New York City, as well as developed NYC Business Express, an online portal for opening and running a business. In the fall of 2006 Hecht was named Director of Business Recovery for the State of Louisiana, within Louisiana Economic Development, the state's economic development department, and tasked with assisting businesses impacted by Hurricane Katrina. Over the next two years, Hecht developed and managed the $220M Louisiana Business Recovery Grant and Loan program, and the $9.5 million Technical Assistance to Small Firms program.

In the summer of 2008, Hecht was named President & CEO of Greater New Orleans, Inc. (GNO, Inc.), the economic development organization charged with rebuilding the economy of Greater New Orleans following Hurricane Katrina. In 2015, he spoke at TEDxNewOrleans. The work of GNO, Inc. has included recruiting companies like DXC Technology, securing for New Orleans' airport nonstop service by British Airways to London, passing federal legislation on National Flood Insurance – the Homeowners Flood Insurance Affordability Act of 2014, and passing tax reform for Louisiana that lowered income taxes. In September of 2022, GNO, Inc., was awarded $50 million from the U.S. Economic Development Administration for "H2theFuture," a plan to develop clean hydrogen for Louisiana industry.

In 2022, Hecht was named Honorary Consul of Finland for Louisiana, Arkansas and Mississippi.

In 2024, Hecht was named Infrastructure and Economic Development Coordinator for Super Bowl LIX by Governor Jeff Landry. Following the game, sportswriter Jeff Duncan wrote that "The city never looked so beautiful, its landmarks so majestic. The Cathedral, Saenger and Dome were resplendent. Downtown blazed like a Pixar movie brought to life."

In May 2025, Governor Jeff Landry tasked Hecht with "another Herculean task," to oversee Louisiana's biggest infrastructure project: the multibillion-dollar container terminal that the Port of New Orleans is planning to build in St. Bernard Parish, as well as the associated toll road that will link it to the interstate network 10 miles away.

== Recognition ==
Hecht has been broadly recognized for his economic development work, including: #2 Economic Development Deal in America 2017 (Silver Award); Congressional testimony on the National Flood Insurance Program (NFIP); Norman C. Francis Leadership Institute Fellow; "1 of 10 People Who Made a Difference" in the South; "1 of the 25 Most Powerful People" in the 10/12 Corridor; CEO of the Year for 2018 in Biz New Orleans magazine. In September of 2022, GNO, Inc. was named "Economic Development Organization of the Year" by the International Economic Development Council.

== Music ==
Hecht performs regularly as a disc jockey under the name "DJ El Camino." He has played in a range of venues, from House of Blues to a Mardi Gras float with rapper Lupe Fiasco. Hecht maintains the website djelcamino.com and the Instagram account "@therealcamino" to catalogue his events.
