= Michael Schwartz (educational administrator) =

American academic administrator (1937–2024)

- Born: July 29, 1937
- Died: January 2, 2024 (aged 86)

Michael Schwartz (July 29, 1937 – January 2, 2024) was an American academic administrator who served as president of Kent State University and later in the same position at Cleveland State University (CSU). While at CSU he phased out open admissions for college undergraduates.

== Biography ==
Schwartz was educated as a sociologist, with all his degrees (BS, MA, Ph.D.) from the University of Illinois at Urbana-Champaign. He was on the faculty of Indiana University, Wayne State University and Florida Atlantic University. He came to Kent State University in 1976 as vice president over graduate studies and research and was appointed president in 1982, a position he held until 1991. The Michael Schwartz Center, an administrative building housed in the former home of the Kent State University School, is named for him.

Schwartz implemented major reforms while at CSU. New dorms were built, a new student center and new administration buildings. There were also major renovations of class room buildings. He not only implemented admission requirements, but he also oversaw a major rise in the bar passing rate of Cleveland-Marshall School of Law graduates. One of his last acts as president was to recommend a salary freeze for the next fiscal year.

Schwartz died on January 2, 2024, at the age of 86.

The library at CSU is named for Schwartz.
