= Keith Gilyard =

American academic (born 1952)

Keith Gilyard (born 1952 in New York City) is a writer and American professor of English and African American Studies. He has passionately embraced African American expressive culture over the course of his career as a poet, scholar, and educator. Beyond his own literary output, he has pursued – and in some instances merged - two main lines of humanistic inquiry: literary studies, with its concern for beauty and significant form, and rhetorical studies, with its emphasis on the effect of trope and argument in culture. Moreover, his interests branch out into popular culture, civic discourse, and educational praxis. A critical perspective concerning these areas is, in his view, integral to the development of discerning and productive publics both on and beyond campuses and therefore crucial to the optimal practice of democracy.

As a faculty member at Medgar Evers College-CUNY, Gilyard helped to establish (1986) the National Black Writers Conference, now convened biennially at that venue. He served as director of the Writing Program at Syracuse University (1995–1999) and as interim chair of the Department of African American Studies at the same university (1996–1997). During that period, he taught course at Onondaga Community College and Auburn State Prison. Upon his arrival at Penn State in 1999, he began planning the seventeenth Penn State Conference on Rhetoric and Composition, which was held during the summer of 2001 around the theme “American Ethnic Rhetorics.” Long active in national organizations, Gilyard headed the Conference on College Composition and Communication (CCCC) in 2000 and was the centennial president of the National Council of Teachers of English (NCTE) in 2011–2012. Before joining academe full-time, Gilyard contributed to several community initiatives, including newspapers and libraries as well as educational and other service programs.

== Education ==
Gilyard received his undergraduate degree (BS) from the City University CUNY Baccalaureate Program (1974), his Master of Fine Arts (MFA) from Columbia University (1979), and his doctorate (EdD) from New York University (1985), this last degree under the mentorship of Gordon M. Pradl.

== Career ==
Gilyard's first college teaching appointment was at LaGuardia Community College in 1980. In 1981, Gilyard became a faculty member at Medgar Evers College of the City University of New York. He continued at Medgar Evers as a teacher and writing program administrator until 1993, when he took a position as professor of writing and English at Syracuse University. He directed Syracuse University's writing program from 1995 to 1999. Since 1999, he has been on the faculty of Penn State University, where he currently serves as the Edwin Erle Sparks Professor of English and African American Studies.

Notable among Gilyard's professional accomplishments are his receipt of two American Book Awards for his monographs Voices of the Self: A Study of Language Competence (1991) and John Oliver Killens: A Life of Black Literary Activism (2010); Faculty Honoree, City University of New York (1993); the Penn State Class of 1933 Medal of Distinction in the Humanities (2005); the Penn State Faculty Scholar Medal for Outstanding Achievement in the Arts and Humanities (2006); Honor Book Award from the Black Caucus of the American Library Association (2011); CCCC Exemplar Award (2013); NCTE Advancement of People of Color Leadership Award (2014); the Assembly of the State of New York Proclamation for Career Achievement (2015); the NCTE Distinguished Service Award (2018), and the Rhetoric Society of America Cheryl Geisler Award for Outstanding Mentor (2020). He has presented at more than 150 colleges and professional conferences.

== Publications ==
Gilyard's publications are substantial, including scholarly monographs and articles, biographies, poetry, fiction, and textbooks. His major publications include the following:

=== Scholarly monographs ===
- Discourse in Black: Three Essential Works (Wayne State University Press, 2025)
- On African-American Rhetoric with Adam Banks (Routledge, 2018)
- Louise Thompson Patterson: A Life of Struggle for Justice (Duke University Press, 2017)
- True to the Language Game: African American Discourse, Cultural Politics, and Pedagogy (Routledge, 2011)
- John Oliver Killens: A Life of Black Literary Activism (University of Georgia Press, 2010)
- Conversations in Cultural Rhetoric and Composition Studies with Victor Taylor (The Davies Group, Publishers, 2009)
- Composition and Cornel West: Notes Toward a Deep Democracy (Southern Illinois University Press, 2008)
- Liberation Memories: The Rhetoric and Poetics of John Oliver Killens (Wayne State University Press, 2003)
- Let's Flip the Script: An African American Discourse on Language, Literature, and Learning (Wayne State University Press, 1996)
- Voices of the Self: A Study of Language Competence (Wayne State University Press, 1991)

=== Creative Writing ===
- The Promise of Language: A Memoir (Wayne State University Press, 2025)
- On Location: Poems (Third World Press Foundation, 2024)
- Impressions: New and Selected Poems (Third World Press Foundation, 2021)
- Monologues: Poems (FCG, 2020)
- Dominant Seventh: Poems (FCG, 2020)
- The Next Great Old-School Conspiracy: A Novella (Blind Beggar Press, 2016)
- Wing of Memory: Poems (Whirlwind Press, 2015)
- How I Figure: Poems (Whirlwind Press, 2003)
- Poemographies (Whirlwind Press, 2001)
- American 40: Poems (Eclipse III, 1993)

=== Textbooks and edited/compiled collections ===
- Jazz in Jail, by Louis Reyes Rivera, edited and wrote foreword. (Blind Beggar Press, 2016)
- Rhetorical Choices: A Reader for Writers, 2nd ed., ed. with Deborah Holdstein and Chuck Schuster (Longman, 2007. [1st ed. 2004])
- Rhetoric and Ethnicity, ed. with Vorris Nunley (Heinemann, 2004)
- African American Literature, ed. with Anissa Wardi (Longman, 2004)
- Race, Rhetoric, and Composition, ed. (Heinemann, 1999)
- Spirit & Flame: An Anthology of Contemporary African American Poetry, ed. (Syracuse University Press, 1997)
- Reflections on a Gift of Watermelon Pickle . . . and Other Modern Verse, 2nd ed., ed. with Stephen Dunning, Edward Lueders, Naomi Shihab Nye, and Demetrice A. Worley (Scott Foresman 1995)

== See also ==
- ECOT, Charter Schools, and Voucher Programs in Ohio
- Gilyard, Keith. Composition and Cornel West: Notes toward a Deep Democracy. Carbondale: Southern Illinois University Press, 2008.
- Gilyard, Keith. Voices of the Self: A Study of Language Competence. Detroit: Wayne State UP, 1991.
- McInturff, Adam. "Keith Gilyard." COMPbiblio: Leaders and Influences in Composition Theory and Practice. Allison D. Smith and Trixie G. Smith, eds. Southlake, TX: Fountainhead, 2007.
- Welcome to the Department of English
