= Wayne Frederick (footballer) =

Trinidadian footballer (born 2004)

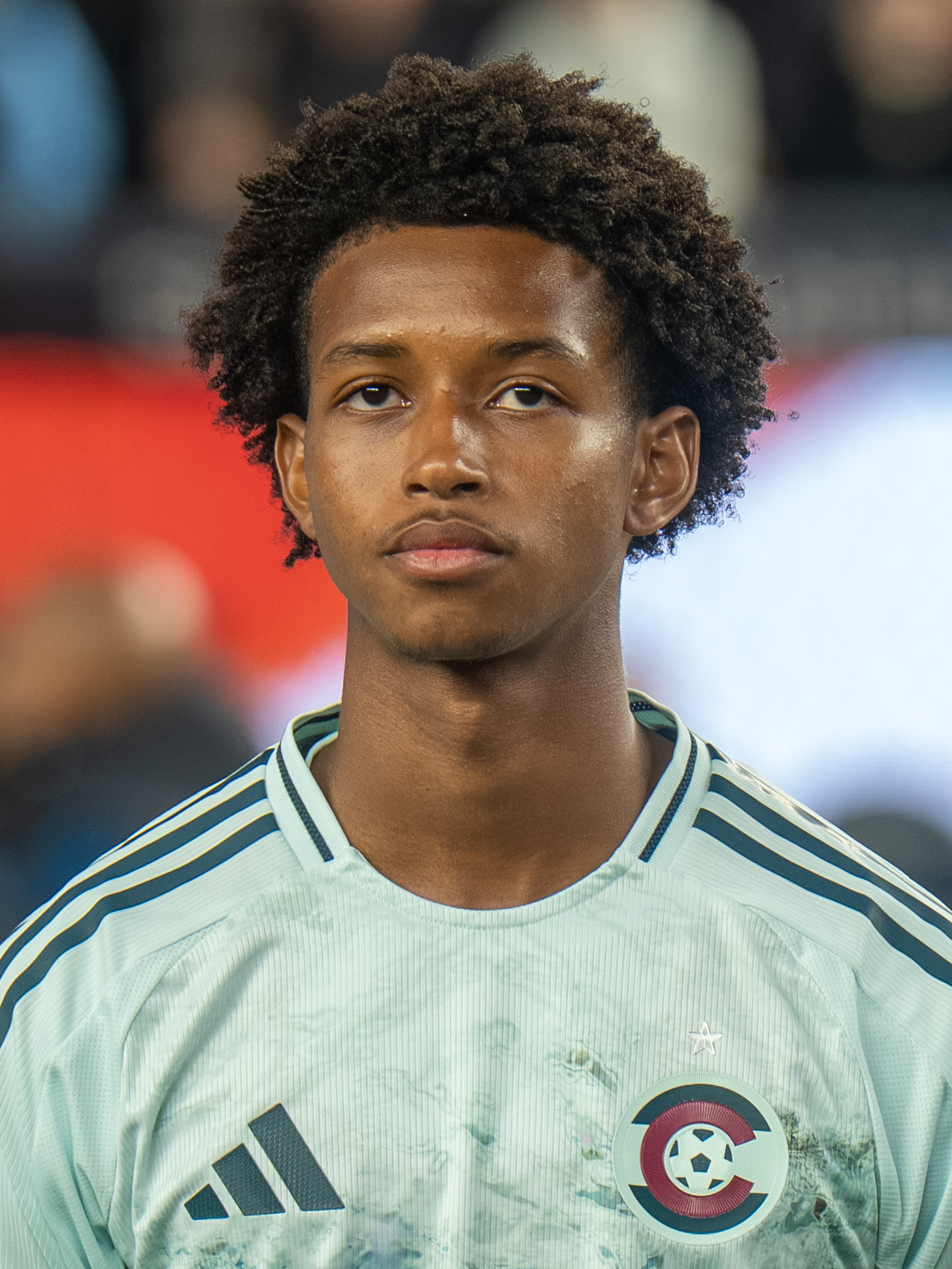
- Frederick with the Colorado Rapids in 2026

Personal information
- Full name: Wayne Alix Ian Frederick II
- Date of birth: June 13, 2004 (age 22)
- Place of birth: Cabin John, Maryland, U.S.
- Height: 6 ft 0 in (1.83 m)
- Positions: Defender; midfielder

Team information
- Current team: Colorado Rapids
- Number: 13

Youth career
- 2014–2022: Bethesda SC

College career
Years	Team	Apps	(Gls)
2022–2023	Duke Blue Devils	36	(4)

Senior career*
Years	Team	Apps	(Gls)
2024–	Colorado Rapids	10	(0)
2024–	→ Colorado Rapids 2 (loan)	22	(1)

International career^{‡}
2024–	Trinidad and Tobago	5	(0)
- * Club domestic league appearances and goals as of 10:22, 9 January 2026 (UTC) ‡ National team caps and goals as of 01:42, 19 March 2025 (UTC)

Wayne Alix Ian Frederick II (born June 13, 2004) is a footballer who plays for Major League Soccer club Colorado Rapids. Born in the United States, he plays for the Trinidad and Tobago national team.

== Early life ==
Frederick played youth soccer with Bethesda SC, beginning in 2014. He also attended St. Albans School, where he played for the boys soccer team, where he earned 2021 All-American honors, won a D.C. State Championship, was named the 2021 D.C. State Player of the Year, earned All-Conference honors in 2019 and 2021, and was nominated for the 2022 D.C. Gatorade Player of the Year Award.

== College career ==
In 2022, Frederick began attending Duke University, where he played for the men's soccer team. On October 4, 2022, he scored his first collegiate goal in a victory over the Howard Bison. After his freshman season, he was named to the All-ACC Academic Team and was ranked #60 on the TopDrawerSoccer Top 100 Freshmen list. On October 27, 2023, he scored a brace in a victory over the Virginia Tech Hokies. In 2023, he was named to the All-ACC Academic Team.

== Club career ==
At the 2024 MLS SuperDraft, Frederick was selected in the first round (second overall) by the Colorado Rapids. In January 2024, he signed a three-year contract with the club, with a club option for 2027. He also spent time on loan with the second team, Colorado Rapids 2, making his debut on March 17 in an MLS Next Pro match against St. Louis City 2, recording his first assist on March 22 in a 2024 U.S. Open Cup match in a 3–0 victory over Azteca FC. He made his Major League Soccer debut with the first team on April 13 against the San Jose Earthquakes.

== International career ==
Born in the United States, Frederick is Trinidadian descent and holds dual-citizenship. In April 2020, Frederick was invited to a training camp with the Trinidad and Tobago U20. On 17 December 2024, he debuted with the senior Trinidad and Tobago national team in a friendly 3–1 loss to Saudi Arabia.

=== International goals ===
As of match played 13 October 2025

Scores and results list Trinidad and Tobago's goal tally first, score column indicates score after each Frederick goal.

List of international goals scored by Wayne Frederick
No.	Date	Venue	Opponent	Score	Result	Competition
1	24 September 2026	Sabina Park, Kingston, Jamaica	Haiti	1–1	2–3	2026–27 CONCACAF Nations League A

== Personal life ==
Frederick is the son of Wayne A. I. Frederick, the former president of Howard University.
