= Wayne A. I. Frederick =

Trinidadian surgeon and academic

Wayne Frederick
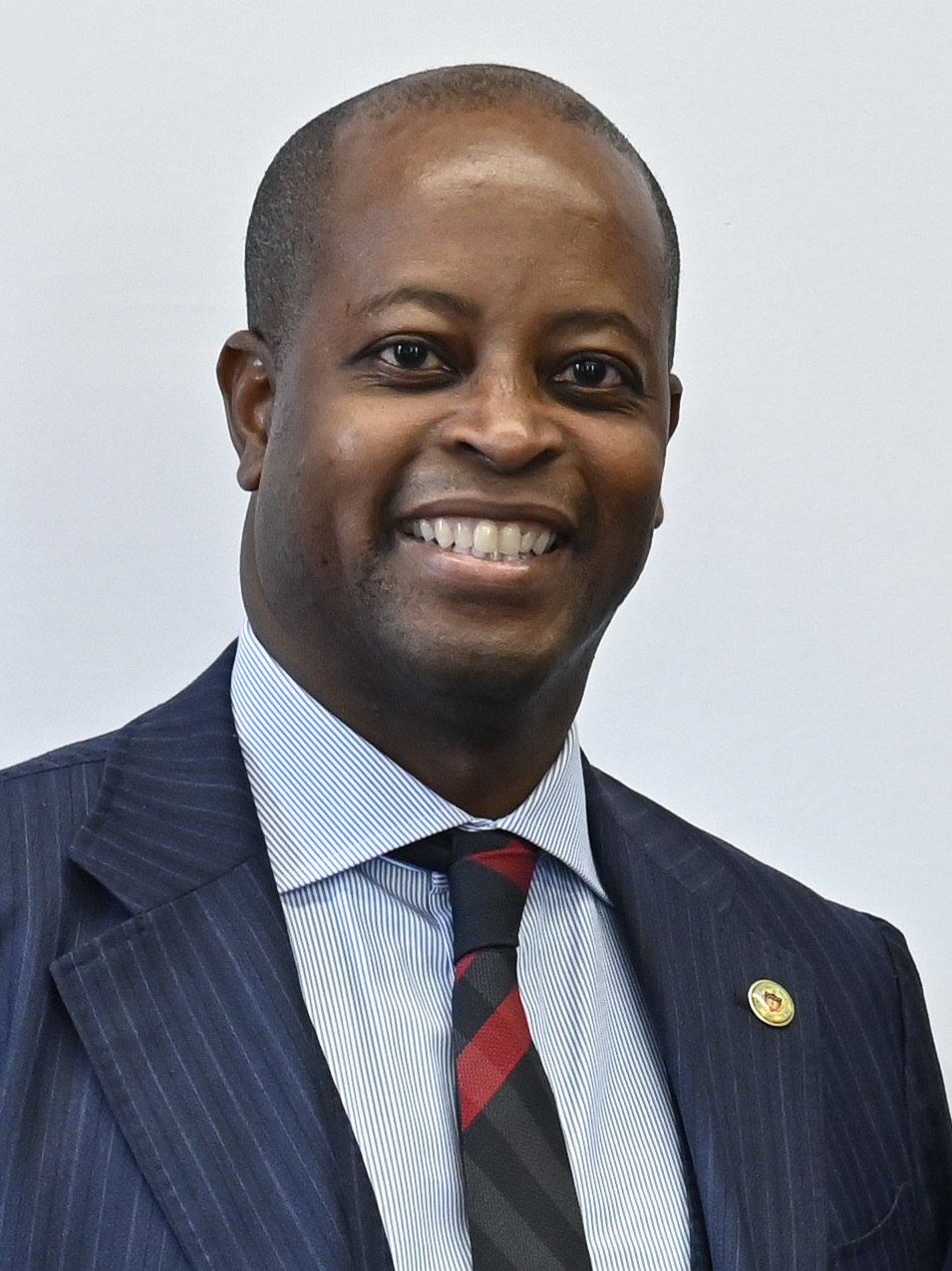

President of Howard University
- Incumbent
- Assumed office September 1, 2025; Acting
- Preceded by: Ben Vinson III
- In office July 21, 2014 – August 31, 2023
- Preceded by: Sidney Ribeau
- Succeeded by: Ben Vinson III

Personal details
- Born: Wayne Alix Ian Frederick; June 17, 1971 (age 55) Port of Spain, Trinidad and Tobago
- Children: Wayne
- Education: Howard University (BS, MD, MBA)

Wayne Alix Ian Frederick (born June 17, 1971) is a Trinidadian-American scholar, surgeon, and university administrator. He is currently the interim president of Howard University in Washington D.C. and a practicing cancer surgeon at Howard University Hospital. Frederick also serves as the Charles R. Drew Professor Surgery at the Howard University College of Medicine. He most recently served as the Interim CEO of the American Cancer Society and ACS CAN.

== Biography ==
=== Early life ===
Wayne A. I. Frederick was born in Port of Spain, Trinidad. At birth, Frederick was diagnosed with sickle cell disease. As a result of being hospitalized three to six times a year, Frederick became interested in science. He also accompanied his mother, a nurse, on visits to her workplace.

=== Academics ===
Frederick pursued Ordinary and Advance Level college-prep studies at Saint Mary's College (high school), Port of Spain, Trinidad. Frederick enrolled at Howard University in 1988, at the age of sixteen. As an undergraduate student, Frederick was admitted to Howard University's B.S./M.D. dual degree program. He completed the requirements for both degrees in six years, allowing him to earn both his Bachelor of Science and his medical degree by the age of 22.

During his surgical residency at Howard University Hospital, he was mentored by renowned doctor LaSalle D. Leffall Jr. and Dr. Clive O. Callendar. He was greatly influenced by Leffall (First African-American president of the American Cancer Society in 1978 and of the American College of Surgeons in 1995) to follow a course in surgical oncology. He completed his post-doctoral research and surgical oncology fellowships at the University of Texas MD Anderson Cancer Center.

Frederick began his academic career as associate director of the Cancer Center at the University of Connecticut in 2004. Upon his return to Howard University, he served as Associate Dean in the College of Medicine, Division Chief in the Department of Surgery, Director of the Cancer Center, and Deputy Provost for Health Sciences. He also earned a Master of Business Administration degree from Howard University's School of Business in 2011. Frederick continues to operate and lectures to the second-year medical students of Howard University's College of Medicine. His medical research seeks to narrow the disparity in all cancer-care outcomes, with a focus on gastrointestinal cancers.

On October 1, 2013, following the resignation of Sidney A. Ribeau, Frederick became Interim President of Howard University.

=== President of Howard University ===
In 2014, Frederick was named the 17th president of Howard University. In 2017, the Howard University Board of Trustees approved the extension of Dr. Frederick's contract as president of the university until June 30, 2024 – a five-year extension of his original agreement.

In January 2019, Frederick unveiled the university's new strategic plan, Howard Forward, which serves as the blueprint for the institution for the next five years. In April 2019, Frederick began teaching a weekly course designed for first-year Ph.D. students, titled College and University Presidency, as part of the School of Education's Higher Education Leadership and Policy Studies (HELPS) Ph.D. program. The course covers the structure and governance of colleges and universities, with a focus on Minority Serving Institutions (MSI).

He established the Bison STEM Scholars program to increase the number of underrepresented students in STEM masters and masters/doctorate programs, keeping with Howard's legacy of providing a diverse pipeline of STEM talent. He launched and expanded the Howard West partnership with Google designed to immerse students in educational and professional experiences taught by Google staff and Howard professors. He was also in charge of managing the school's $1.5 billion real estate portfolio.

Under his leadership, university's bonds rating (BBB-) improved from "stable" to "positive", all full-time faculty members salaries have been brought to median or higher to ensure alignment with compensation at peer institutions, U.S. News & World Report's ranking of the university increased by more than 60 spots, placing Howard firmly in the top 100 among "national universities", and the university has received major grants to support their lowest-income students.

Additionally, Dr. Frederick helped Howard University's endowment surpass $1 billion in assets, making the institution the first among historically Black colleges and universities to reach the milestone.

In June 2023, before his first retirement, the Howard University Board of Trustees unanimously approved the renaming of The Undergraduate Library in honor of Dr. Frederick. This is only the third building on the campus to be named after a prior president and the first to be named while that president was still in office.

In September 2025, Frederick was named interim president following the resignation of Ben Vinson III.

=== Issues during presidency ===
In 2014, Frederick was paid $953,104, ranking 45th-best-paid among 510 presidents of private American colleges. In the winter of that year, classes were postponed because the college was unable to heat its facilities. In 2018, he was paid $1,070,322, the highest salary of university head in the DC area. The start of the Spring semester was delayed by a week as the university procured temporary boilers to heat impacted buildings across campus. The construction of a state-of-the-art combined heat and power plant commenced and is scheduled to be completed by 2023. This is part of a $780M+ investment in capital infrastructure – the largest in the university's history including a $100M appropriation from Congress to begin the rebuilding of Howard University Hospital.

In February 2017, Frederick and sixty-eight other presidents of black institutions went to the White House to meet with various officials, in the hope of securing additional funding from the federal government. The meeting prompted outrage on campus and a spate of graffiti vandalism that included allegations that Frederick did not care about black people and was a "plantation overseer". Mark Mason, an alumnus who is chief financial officer at Citigroup and a vice-co-chair of the university's board of trustees, later told The New Yorker that the graffiti was "inappropriately personalized and should not have happened."

In 2018, students asked Frederick for assistance with housing issues after the university was unable to assign dorm rooms. On multiple occasions, Frederick responded that students' emails were inappropriate in tone. After students protested, the housing office was closed and campus police were called. He later issued a statement saying that he had fallen short of student expectations. As a result, Frederick's meetings with Howard University Student Association (HUSA) president were expanded to include bi-weekly conversations with a broader range of student leaders representing undergraduate and graduate/professional programs. Most student residence halls have been fully remodeled or rebuilt within the past six years with more than 1,500 new units planned to be constructed in the coming years.

In April 2018, faculty returned a vote of no confidence in Frederick. Among the faculty who voted, 61 percent expressed a lack of faith in Frederick's leadership. However, Frederick received a letter of support from the university's Council of Deans, which represents leaders of Howard's schools and colleges. The group wrote that it is "confident that the plans, strategies, programs and activities of the University Board of Trustees and Frederick are yielding positive results and are on a positive trajectory for a strong and positive future for our beloved institution." The school's alumni association also rejected calls for Frederick to step down. In a letter sent by Nadia N. Pinto, its president, she wrote that it was important to hear the concerns of students and meet their needs, but Frederick had been a capable and effective leader who deserved to remain in his job.

== Medical work ==
Frederick has conducted research bridging health disparities with a particular emphasis on cancer outcomes among African Americans and other underrepresented groups. He has served as the principal investigator for major collaborations with the National Cancer Institute, Johns Hopkins University, and local and national minority-serving oncology programs.

At the UConn Comprehensive Cancer Center, he brought a new surgical technique to operate on patients with advanced rectal cancer, and radio frequency ablation for patients with liver cancer.

== Personal life ==
Frederick is the father of Wayne Frederick, a professional footballer.

== Other roles ==
=== Previous roles ===
- Chair of the Surgical Section of the National Medical Association
- Director of the Drew-Walker Residents Forum of the Surgical Section of the National Medical Association
- Vice Chairman of the District of Columbia Board of Medicine
- Member of the Clinical Affairs Committee of the Society of Surgical Oncology (named in 2004)
- Member of the Committee of Young Surgeons of the American College of Surgeons (named in 2003)
- Member of the Ethics Committee of the American College of Surgeons
- Member of the Board of Advisors for the White House Initiative on HBCUs

=== Active roles ===
- Since 2023: Senior Advisor at Boston Consulting Group
- Since 2023: Senior Advisor at Blackstone
- Since 2023: Member of the National Academy of Medicine
- Since 2023: Member of the board of trustees for Save the Children.
- Since 2023: member of the board of directors for the American Cancer Society.
- Since 2023: Member of the board of directors for Agostini Limited.
- Since 2022: Member of the board of directors for Workday.
- Since 2022: Elected fellow of the National Academy of Public Administration.
- Since 2021: Member of the board of directors for the Greater Washington Partnership.
- Since 2021: Member of the Potomac Quantum Innovation Center Steering Committee.
- Since 2021: Member of the board of directors for Battelle.
- Since 2020: Member of the advisory board for Coursera University.
- Since 2020: Member of the board of directors for Tempus.
- Since October 2020: Member of the board of directors for Insulet.
- Since July 2020: Member of the board of directors for Forma Therapeutics
- Since July 2020: Appointed by the Howard University Board of Trustees as the Charles R. Drew Endowed Chair of Surgery
- Since 2020: Chair, Mid-Eastern Atlantic Conference (MEAC) Council of Chief Executive Officers (CCEOS)
- Since February 2020: Member of the board of directors for Humana Inc.
- Since July 2019: Member of the board of directors for the U.S. Chamber of Commerce
- Since July 2019: Chair, Consortium of Universities of Washington Metropolitan Area
- Since January 2017: Member of the Board of Federal Reserve Bank of Richmond
- Since April 2016: Member of the American Surgical Association, known as "the nation's oldest and most prestigious surgical organization."
- Since 2015: Member of the Board of Directors of Mutual of America

== Awards ==
- 2023 W. Montague Cobb Lifetime Achievement Award, National Medical Association
- 2022 Honorary Degree of Doctor of Science, University of West Indies
- 2022 Higher Education Leadership Foundation, Ideation, Innovation and Collaboration 2022 Person of the Year
- 2020 Order of the Republic of Trinidad and Tobago, awarded by the Government of Trinidad and

Tobago

- 2019 The University of Texas MD Anderson Cancer Center, Distinguished Alumni Award
- 2021 Honored by the Carnegie Corporation of New York's Great Immigrant Award.
