= H. Patrick Swygert =

Former president of Howard University

Haywood Patrick Swygert (born March 17, 1943) was the president of Howard University in Washington, D.C., from 1995 until 2008.

== Career ==
He is a graduate of South Philadelphia High School and has been inducted into the SPHS Alumni Cultural Hall of Fame. Swygert graduated from Howard University in 1965, the same year President Lyndon B. Johnson delivered his historic speech to the graduating class.

Swygert later was awarded a J.D. degree from Howard University Law School.

Swygert served as president of the State University of New York at Albany from 1990 to 1995 and previously served as executive vice president of Temple University, where he was also a professor of law in the Temple University School of Law.

He is a law professor, member of the Commission on Presidential Elections, Alpha Phi Omega National Service Fraternity, Zeta Phi chapter, Howard University, and Alpha Delta Eta Chapter, State University of New York at Albany (honorary member) and Omega Psi Phi, Alpha chapter.

Swygert resigned as president of Howard University effective June 30, 2008 although he remained active on campus as a professor and fundraiser.

Swygert is a member of the Defense Policy Board Advisory Committee.

Academic offices
Preceded by Judith A. Ramaley (Acting)	President of University at Albany, SUNY; 1990 – June 30, 1995	Succeeded by Karen R. Hitchcock
Preceded by Joyce A. Ladner	President of Howard University; July 1, 1995 – June 30, 2008	Succeeded by Sidney A. Ribeau
