= Michael Hecht (communication scientist) =

American academic

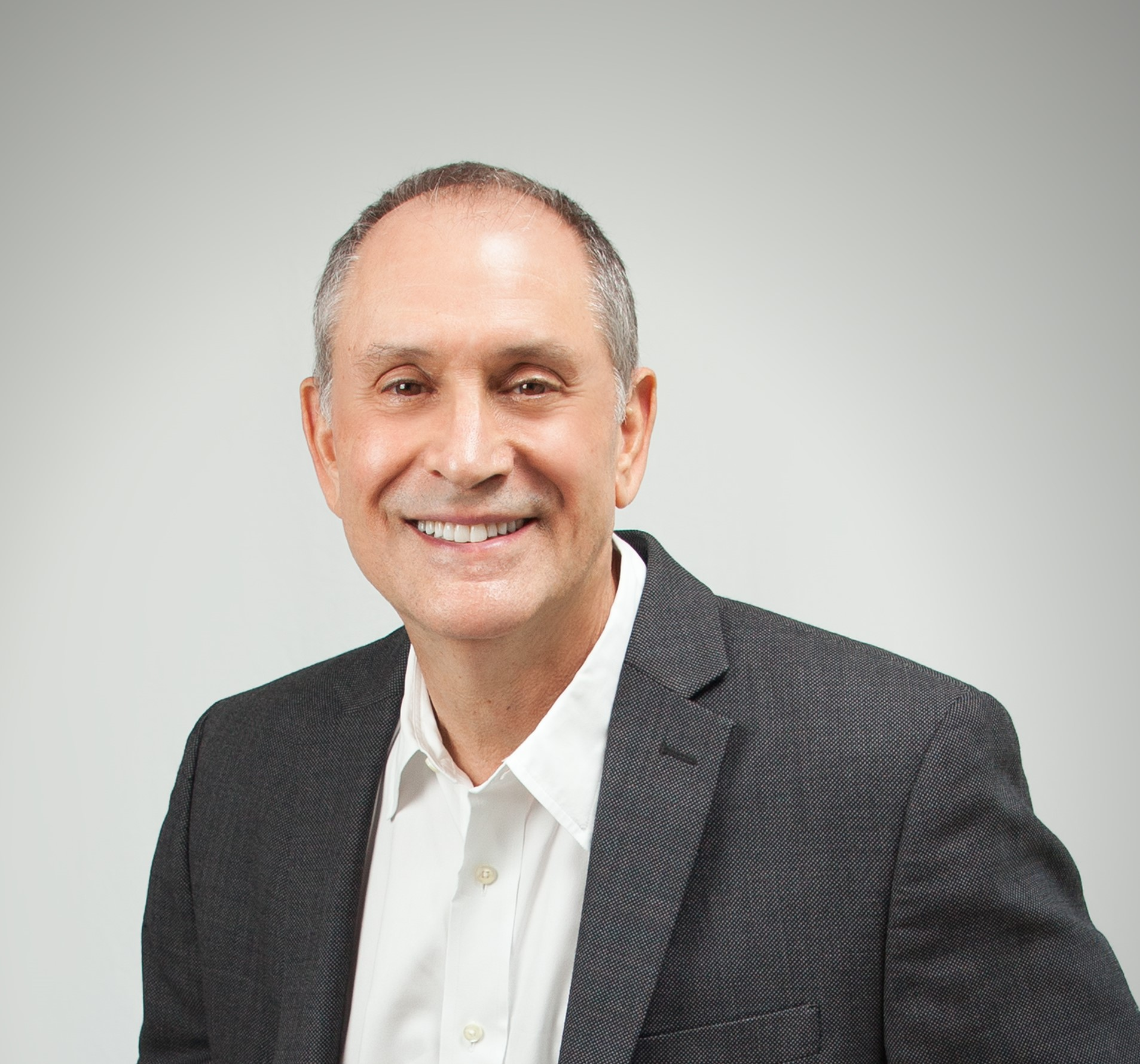
Michael L. Hecht, PhD

Michael L. Hecht is a researcher in the field of human communication, emphasising the areas of interpersonal and inter-ethnic relationships, identity, and adolescent drug resistance. In 1973, Hecht earned his M.A. from Queens College, City University of New York and his Ph.D. I in communications from the University of Illinois Urbana-Champaign. He is now Liberal Arts Research Professor of Communication Arts and Sciences and Crime, Law, and Justice in the Department of Communication Arts and Sciences at Penn State University. He has previously been full professor at Arizona State University.

== Research ==
His research areas include identity, prejudice, ethnicity, communication satisfaction, adolescent drug resistance, and romantic love. The National Institute on Drug Abuse awarded Hecht a series of major grants on the social process of adolescent drug offers. With these, a multicultural drug prevention program was formed for seventh graders called, keepin’ it REAL. Keepin’ it REAL went on to be selected as a “model program” by the National Registry of Effective Programs for its ability to influence adolescent drug use.

== Experience ==
Hecht has conducted training and research for companies such as Xerox, ARCO, GTE, Jackson National Life Insurance, and U-Haul. He has also conducted evaluation research for federally funded drug abuse and crime prevention and treatment programs and for mental health agencies and served on school district advisory boards, as well as on a citizens advisory board for a hospital.

== Achievements ==
He has earned numerous awards starting with Access Producers Achievement Award, Dickenson Cablesystems, for "Kids Broadcasting System News," in 1982, and his most recent being the National Communication Association's African American Communication & Culture Division's 2003 Distinguished Scholarship Award. In 2020, the University of Illinois College of Liberal Arts and Sciences awarded Hecht with the LAS Humanitarian Award. Hecht is currently teaching numerous courses in the Communications, Arts and Sciences, and continuing his work with Keepin’ it REAL.

He has been on the editorial board of several journals in his subject.

== Publications ==
=== Books ===
- Baldwin, J.R., Faulkner, S.L., Hecht, M.L. & Lindsley, S.L. (Eds.) (2006). Redefining Culture: Perspectives across the disciplines. Mahwah, NJ: Lawrence Erlbaum Associates, Inc.
- Hecht, M.L., Jackson, R.L., & Ribeau, S. (2003). African American Communication: Exploring Identity and Culture (2nd edition). Mahwah, NJ: Lawrence Erlbaum Associate, Inc.
- Hecht, M.L., Collier, M.J., &, & Ribeau, S. (1993). African American communication: Ethnic identity and cultural interpretations. Newbury Park, CA: Sage.
- Miller, M.A., Alberts, J.K., Hecht, M.L., Krizek, R.L., & Trost, M. (2000). Adolescent relationships and drug abuse. NY: Erlbaum Publications.
- Guerrero, L, DeVito, J.A. & Hecht, M.L. (Eds.) (1999). The nonverbal communication reader: classical and contemporary perspectives (2nd ed.). Prospect Heights, IL: Waveland.
- DeVito, J.A. & Hecht, M.L. (Eds.) (1990). The nonverbal communication reader. Prospect Heights, IL: Waveland.
- Hecht, M.L. (Ed.)(1998). Communicating prejudice. Newbury Park, CA: Sage.
- Petronio, S., Alberts, J.K., Hecht, M.L., & Buley, J.L. (Eds.) (1993). Contemporary perspectives on interpersonal communication. Dubuque, Iowa: W.C. Brown, Inc.
- Alperin, H., Bosworth, K., Buckley, P., Hecht, M.L., Jayawardene, W., & LaChausse, R. (2024). Preventing Opioid Use and Overdose in School-aged Youth. https://www.hidta.org/wp-content/uploads/2024/10/FINAL-Preventing-Opioid-Use-and-Overdose-in-School-Age-Youth_r.pdf
- Kagawa-Singer, M, Dressler, WW, George, SM, Elwood, WN, with the assistance of a specially appointed panel (see note). (2015, March). The cultural framework for health: An integrative approach for research and program evaluation. Bethesda: NIH Office of Behavioral and Social Sciences Research. (note): Alphabetical listing of Expert Panel Members: Claudia R. Baquet, Ronny A. Bell, Linda Burhansstipanov, Nancy J. Burke, Sodemtotuuzanne Dibble, Linda Garro, Clarence C. Gravlee, Peter Guarnaccia, Michael L. Hecht, Jeffrey Henderson, Dan Hruschka, Roberto Lewis-Fernández, Robert Like, Charles Mouton, Hector F. Myers, J. Bryan Page, Rena Pasick, Bernice Pescosolido, Nancy Schoenberg, Bradley Stoner, Gregory Strayhorn, Laura Szalacha, Joseph Trimble, Thomas S. Weisner, David Williams.
- Jackson, R.L., Johnson, A.L., Hecht, M.L., & Ribeau, S. (2020). African American Communication: Exploring Identity and Culture (3rd edition). NY: Routledge
- Hecht, M.L., Jackson, R.L., & Ribeau, S. (2003). African American Communication: Exploring Identity and Culture (2nd edition). Mahwah, NJ: Lawrence Erlbaum Associate, Inc.
- Hecht, M.L., Collier, M.J., & Ribeau, S. (1993). African American communication: Ethnic identity and cultural interpretations. Newbury Park, CA: Sage.

=== Others ===
He has published over 160 peer-reviewed journal articles, and a number of book chapters and, presentations.
