= Elaine Richardson (writer) =

Elaine B. Richardson, professionally known as Dr. E, is a professor of Literacy Studies, Department of Teaching and Learning at Ohio State University who is also known as an author, lecturer, performer, and singer and songwriter.

== Early life and education ==
Born in Cleveland, OH in 1960, Richardson became a victim of sex trafficking as a teenager. With the help of her family and educational mentors, she left that life behind in her early 20s and proceeded to earn her bachelor's and master's degrees in English Studies from Cleveland State University (1987-1993) and her PhD in English and Applied Linguistics from Michigan State University (1996). The details of her life are chronicled in her 2013 book PHD to PhD: How Education Saved My Life.

== Career ==
Richardson's research interests include the liberation and critical literacy education of people of the Black African diaspora. Her books include African American Literacies (2003, Routledge), focusing on teaching writing from the point of view of African American language and literacy traditions; Hiphop Literacies (2006 Routledge) is a study of hiphop language use as an extension of Black folk traditions. She has also co-edited two volumes on African American rhetorical theory, Understanding African American Rhetoric: Classical Origins to Contemporary Innovations (2003, Routledge) and African American Rhetoric(s): Interdisciplinary Perspectives (2004, Southern Illinois University Press), and Home Girls Make Some Noise: Hip Hop Feminist Anthology (2007, Parker Publishing).

In 2004, she was Fulbright lecturer/researcher in the Department of Literature in English at the University of the West Indies, Mona, Jamaica.

Richardson's professional memberships include the National Council of Teachers of English (NCTE), the Conference on College Composition and Communication (CCCC), as well as Committee of Linguists of African Descent (CLAD). She is also the founder of the annual Hiphop Literacies Conference, the purpose of which is to bring together scholars, educators, activists, students, artists, and community members to dialogue on pressing social problems.

As a performer, Richardson has taken her one-woman show based on PHD to PhD to universities throughout the United States including Marquette University, Syracuse University, Missouri State University, and many other institutions of higher learning and community organizations.

As a singer and songwriter, Richardson has recorded two full-length albums on her independent label Give Us Free Records: Elevated in 2010, and Songs for the Struggle (2017). Songs she has written have been featured on television shows including Star on the Fox network and Next and Undressed on MTV. Richardson has also performed her music at venues and festivals throughout the United States including the Springfield Jazz Festival, Lansing JazzFest, Penn State University's Alumni Hall and the August Wilson Center for African American Culture.

== Selected publications ==
- Richardson, E. (2004). Coming from the heart: African American students, literacy stories, and rhetorical education. In E. B. Richardson & R. L. Jackson II (Eds.), African American rhetoric(s): Interdisciplinary perspectives (pp. 155–69). Southern Illinois University Press.
- Richardson, Elaine and Alice Ragland. “#StayWoke: The Language and Literacies of the #BlackLivesMatter Movement.” Community Literacy Journal, vol. 12, no. 2, 2018, pp. 27-56.
