= Critical Studies in Media Communication =

- Discipline: Communication studies
- Language: English

Publication details
- Former name: Critical Studies in Mass Communication (1984 - 1999)
- History: 1984-present
- Publisher: Taylor & Francis on behalf of the National Communication Association
- Frequency: 5/year

Standard abbreviations
- ISO 4: Crit. Stud. Media Commun.

Indexing
- ISSN: 1529-5036 (print); 1479-5809 (web)

Links
- Journal homepage

Critical Studies in Media Communication (CSMC) is a peer-reviewed academic journal covering media and mass communication from a cultural studies and critical perspective. The journal is published by Taylor & Francis on behalf of the National Communication Association. CSMC publishes original scholarship in mediated and mass communication from a cultural studies and/or critical perspective.
