= Sidney A. Ribeau =

American academic (born 1947)

Sidney Ribeau

16th President of Howard University
- In office August 2008 – December 2013
- Preceded by: H. Patrick Swygert
- Succeeded by: Wayne A.I. Frederick

9th President of Bowling Green State University
- In office 1995–2008
- Preceded by: Paul J. Olscamp
- Succeeded by: Carol A. Cartwright

Personal details
- Born: December 3, 1947 (age 78) Detroit, Michigan, U.S.
- Education: Wayne State University, (BA); University of Illinois at Urbana–Champaign (MA, PhD)

Sidney Ribeau is an American academic administrator who served as the president of Howard University in Washington, D.C. Prior to accepting the position at Howard, Ribeau was the president of Bowling Green State University for 13 years.

== Education ==
Ribeau was born on December 3, 1947, in Detroit, and is a graduate of Mackenzie High School. Ribeau received his bachelor's degree from Wayne State University in 1971. He earned master's and doctoral degrees in interpersonal communication from the University of Illinois at Urbana–Champaign, in 1973 and 1979, respectively.

== Career ==
Ribeau served on Ohio's Higher Education Funding Commission. He is a member of the board of directors for the National Collegiate Athletic Association and was chair of the Inter-University Council of Presidents in 2005–06. A past member of the Bowling Green and Toledo Chambers of Commerce, he also served on the boards of United Way, the Greater Toledo Urban League, the Toledo Symphony Orchestra, the Teachers Insurance and Annuity Association-College Retirement Equities Fund (TIAA-CREF), the Regional Growth Partnership, the Andersons Inc., Convergys Corp., and Worthington Industries.

In 1976, Ribeau began his teaching career at California State University, Los Angeles as a professor of communication studies. He was honored there as an outstanding teacher and student adviser, and in 1984, became chair of the university's Pan African Studies Department, a position he held for three years. He was then named dean of undergraduate studies at California State University, San Bernardino. From 1990 to 1992, Ribeau was dean of the College of Liberal Arts at California Polytechnic State University, San Luis Obispo, and was then appointed vice president for academic affairs at California State Polytechnic University, Pomona, a position he held until going to Bowling Green in 1995.

=== Bowling Green State University ===
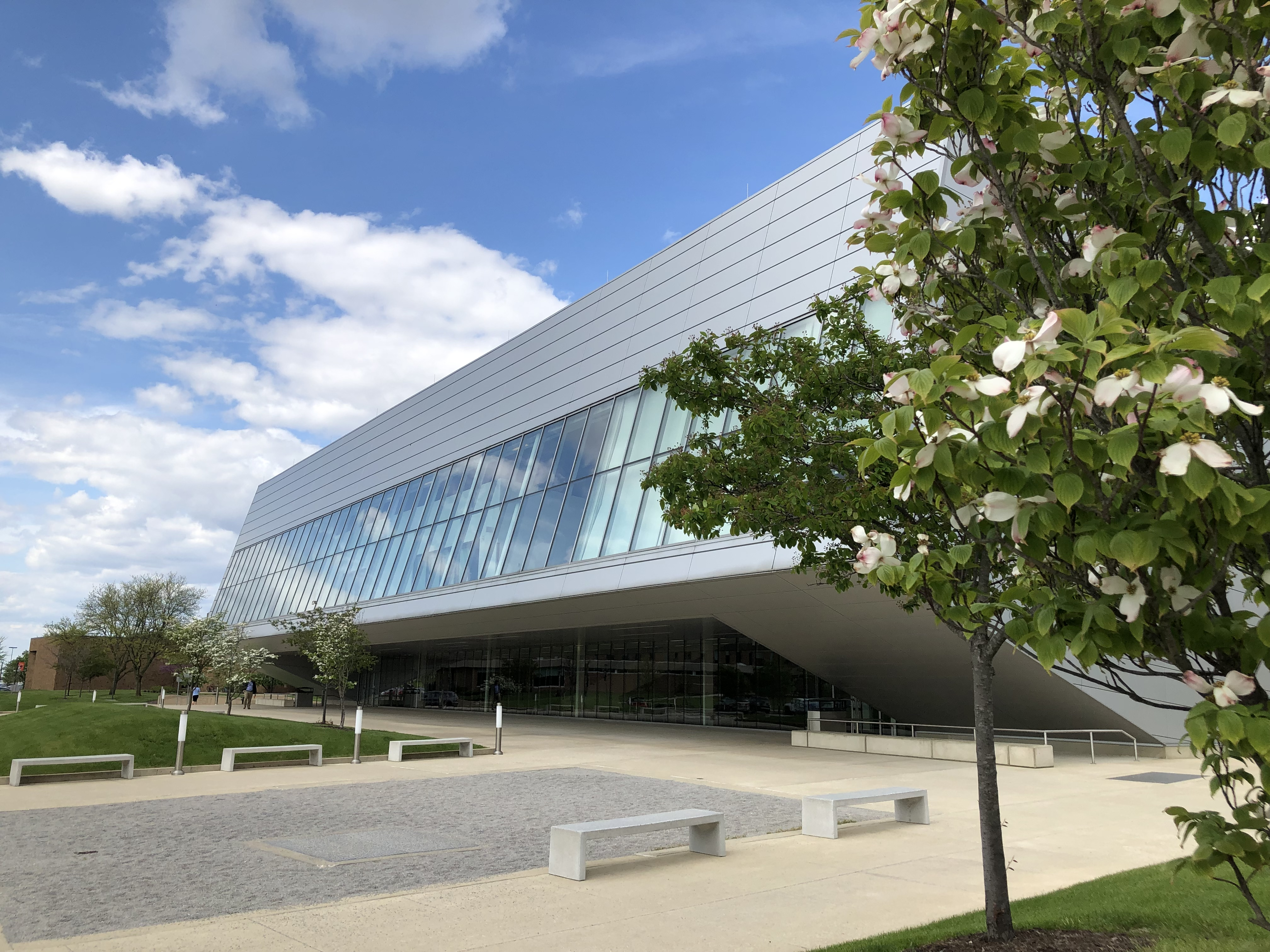
The plaza in front of the Wolfe Center was named Ribeau Plaza after Sidney Ribeau

Ribeau accepted the presidency of Bowling Green State University in 1995, becoming the college's ninth president. During his presidency, Bowling Green created a number of new programs, including the Scholarship of Engagement Initiative, which encouraged collaborative faculty involvement with private and public groups to identify and resolve relevant issues through scholarship. The President's Leadership Academy, begun in 1997, and BGeXperience: Vision and Values, started in 2003, were two others.

In 2003, Ribeau was recognized by the National Association of Student Personnel Administrators, which presented him with its President's Award for his "courage and leadership in guiding the Bowling Green State University campus community to develop a community focused on student learning and designed to educate the whole student by taking students' personal and intellectual growth into consideration."

Contributions to the BGSU grew steadily during Ribeau's tenure. Over $126 million was donated to Building Dreams: The Centennial Campaign for Bowling Green State University.

=== Howard University ===
Ribeau was named the 16th president of Howard University in May 2008. He began his tenure in August 2008, succeeding H. Patrick Swygert.

On October 1, 2013, President Ribeau announced his retirement from the office of President at Howard University, effective the end of December 2013. But as details of the rocky relationship between him and the school's Board of Trustees emerge, it appears that Ribeau was forced out of the job after just five years on the post.

Academic offices
Preceded by Paul J. Olscamp	President of Bowling Green State University; 1995–2008	Succeeded by Carol Cartwright
Preceded by H. Patrick Swygert	President of Howard University; August 2008 – December 2013	Succeeded by Wayne A.I. Frederick
