= Franklin Township, Portage County, Ohio =

Township in Ohio, US

Franklin Township
- Civil township
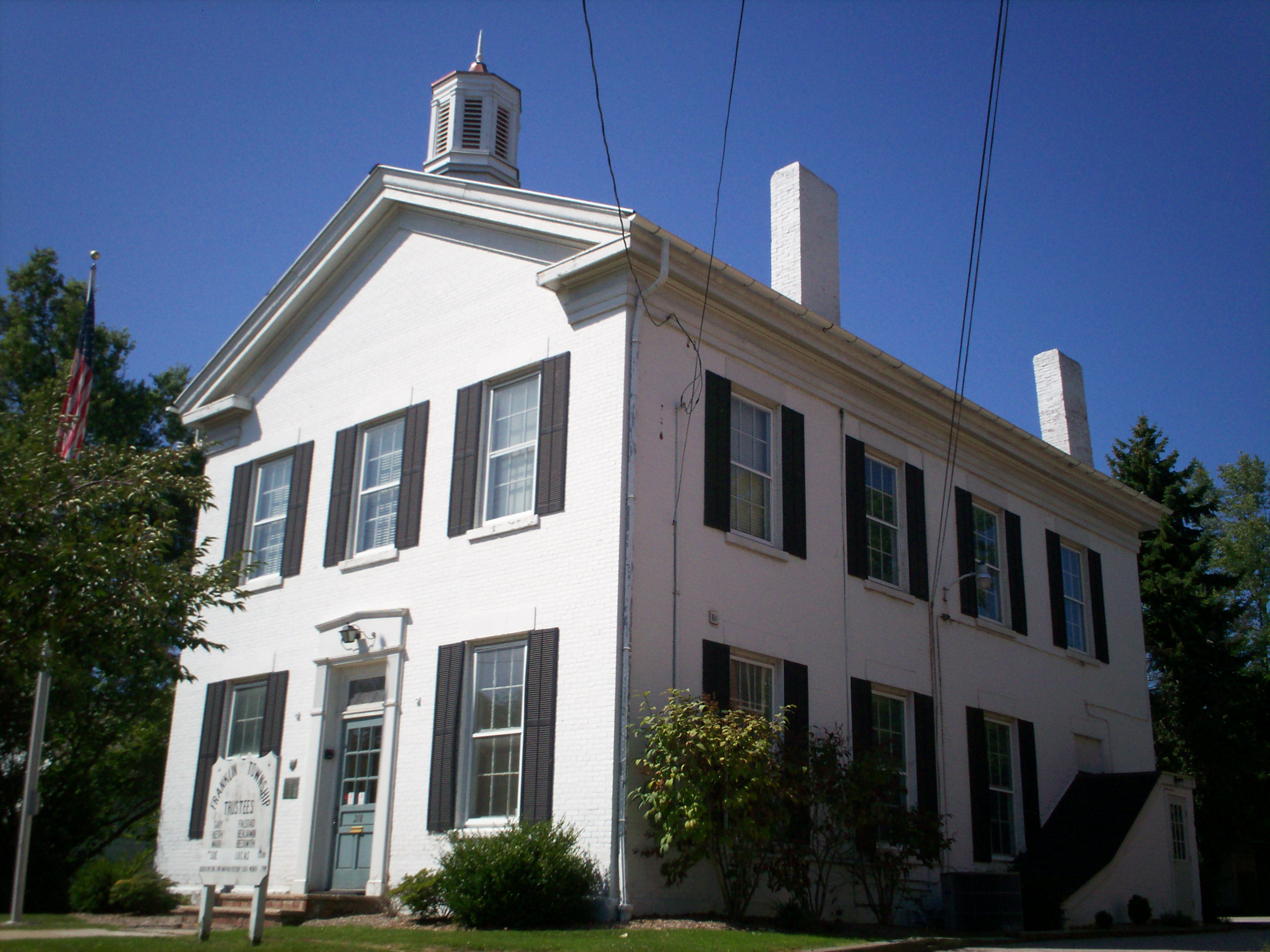
- Franklin Township Hall, built 1837
- Interactive map of Franklin Township
- Location within Ohio Location within the United States
- Coordinates: 41°10′45″N 81°19′59″W
- Country: United States
- State: Ohio
- County: Portage
- Named: 1798
- Organized: 1802
- First election: 1815
- Founder: Aaron Olmsted
- Named for: Aaron Franklin Olmsted

Government
  - Type: Civil township
  - Trustees: Kellie Kapusta; Glenn Russell; Scott Swan

Area
  - Total: 14.3 sq mi (37 km^{2})
  - Land: 12.5 sq mi (32 km^{2})
  - Water: 1.8 sq mi (4.7 km^{2})
- Elevation: 1,102 ft (336 m)

Population (2020)
  - Total: 6,283
  - Density: 502.6/sq mi (194.1/km^{2})
- Time zone: UTC-5 (Eastern (EST))
  - Summer (DST): UTC-4 (EDT)
- ZIP Codes: 44240, 44266
- Area codes: 330, 234
- FIPS code: 39-28392
- GNIS feature ID: 1086827
- Website: franklintownshipohio.org

Franklin Township is a civil township in Portage County, Ohio, United States. It is on the Cuyahoga River in Northeast Ohio on the western edge of the county. The 2010 Census found 5,527 people in the township and the 2020 census recorded 6,283 people. The township is part of the Akron Metropolitan Statistical Area and the larger Cleveland–Akron–Canton Combined Statistical Area.

Franklin Township was originally surveyed as Town 3 Range 9 as part of the Connecticut Western Reserve and was purchased by Aaron Olmsted in 1798. It was one of the first civil townships organized in the Western Reserve and initially covered a large area. The township was named by Aaron Olmsted after his son Aaron Franklin Olmsted. It was first settled in late 1805 by the family of John and Sally Haymaker and its government structure, which consists of three township trustees, was established in 1815. Today Franklin Township is a mostly rural area largely associated with the neighboring city of Kent as the two share a common history, public school district, ZIP code, and fire department.

== Name and history ==
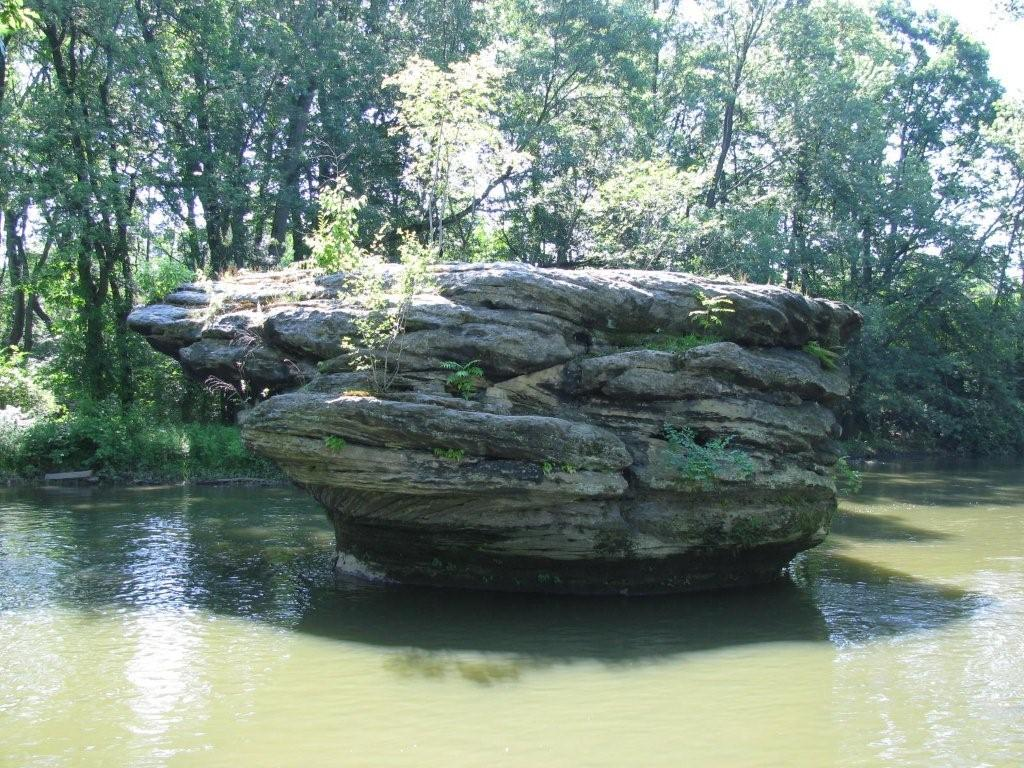
Standing Rock, located in the Cuyahoga River in what is now northern Kent, was an important landmark for Native American tribes in the area.

The area that makes up Franklin Township was originally inhabited by a number of American Indian tribes including the Mound Builders who built a burial mound in the eastern part of the township sometime during the 1st century in what would become Towners Woods Park. Captain Samuel Brady crossed the area around 1780 as part of his campaigns against an unknown tribe, escaping by leaping the Cuyahoga River in present-day downtown Kent and hiding in Brady Lake. In 1796 the area was surveyed by the Connecticut Land Company as part of the Connecticut Western Reserve. The original survey township was known as Town 3 Range 9 and contained 25 square miles (65 km^{2}) and 16,000 acres (6,500 ha) of land. Aaron Olmsted of East Hartford, Connecticut purchased this township at a cost of 12.5 cents an acre and named it for his son Aaron Franklin Olmsted. It is one of twenty-one Franklin Townships statewide. In 1802, much of the original Trumbull County, which covered the entire Western Reserve, was organized under the name of Franklin Township. The area under the Franklin Township name included all of present-day Portage County and much of present-day Summit County as well as parts of present-day Trumbull County. The following year, the township was surveyed into individual lots. At the formation of Portage County in 1807, Franklin Township included what would become Brimfield, Charlestown, Ravenna, and Rootstown townships.

The first settlers arrived in November 1805 when John Haymaker and his family moved west from Warren to the banks of the Cuyahoga River. They were joined by John's brother George and their father Jacob Haymaker and their families early the next year, and built a gristmill in 1807. Initial growth in the area was slow, but eventually two small villages would develop due to the potential power generated by the Cuyahoga River that could be used in gristmills and manufacturing. The first village, known as Franklin Mills, or locally as the "Lower Village", developed mostly around the original Haymaker property. In 1818, Joshua Woodard arrived in the area and began constructing buildings just north of the village forming the "Upper Village" that would come to be known briefly as Carthage.

In the 1820s, Franklin Township was included in the route of the Pennsylvania and Ohio Canal (P & O Canal). When construction began on the canal in the mid-1830s, land speculation was rampant in many areas of northeast Ohio along the canal, including Franklin Mills. As a result, an industrial and business region was established along the east side of the river in what is now downtown Kent. Factories and mills were either planned or constructed along the Cuyahoga River, some of which either were never built or ultimately failed, due mostly to effects of the Panic of 1837. The canal officially opened in 1840, but it would be relatively short-lived, lasting into the 1860s. By 1870 the canal was completely shut down. During this time, what would become the Franklin Township Hall was constructed in 1837 as the intended home of the Franklin Silk Company. The company failed before the building was finished so the township took over the building, finished construction, and began using it for the seat of township government beginning in 1840.

In 1851, the Cleveland and Pittsburgh Railroad was built across the northern part of the township with a station at Earlville, a small settlement that once existed along present-day State Route 43 north of Kent. Though the railroad did little in terms of spurring economic development in the township, it would indirectly lead to later economic and population growth. The creation of what would become the Atlantic and Great Western Railroad under the direction of Marvin Kent began that year after Kent was upset by the Cleveland and Pittsburgh Railroad bypassing Franklin Mills. The arrival of the Atlantic and Great Western in the township in 1863 and the establishment of Franklin Mills as the site of the railroad's maintenance yards and shops the next year fueled a new spurt of prolonged economic and population growth in the village, culminating in it being renamed Kent in 1864 and formally incorporating in 1867.

== Geography ==
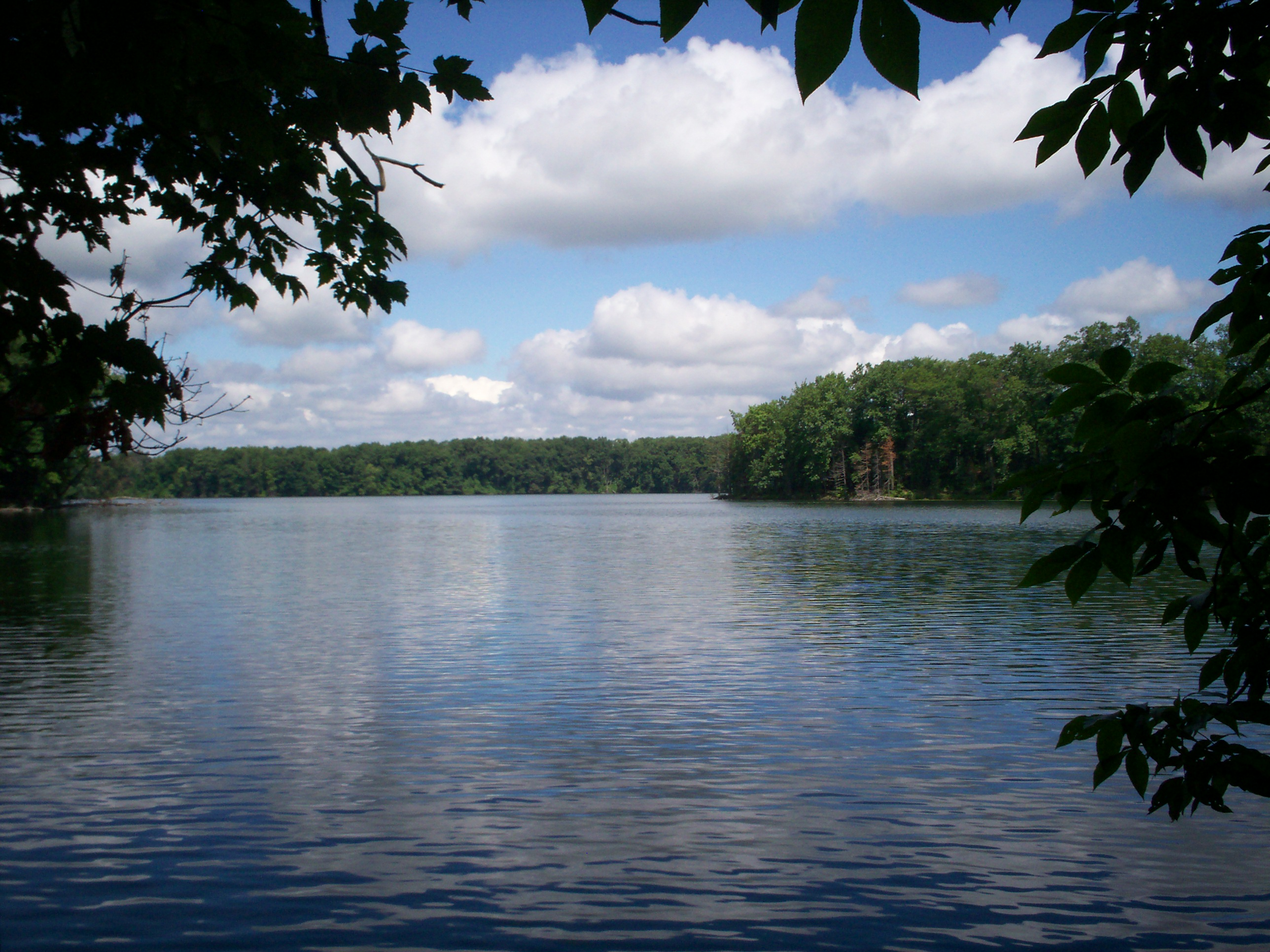
Lake Pippen, located in the eastern part of the township

Franklin Township is in west-central Portage County in Northeast Ohio approximately 10 miles (16 km) northeast of Akron and 30 miles (48 km) southeast of Cleveland. It is bordered by Kent on the south and west, Brimfield Township on the south, Stow on the west, Streetsboro and Sugar Bush Knolls to the north, and Ravenna Township on the east. Franklin Township also touches the city of Hudson on the northwest corner, Shalersville Township on the northeast corner, and Rootstown Township on the southeast corner. Within the boundaries of the township is the unincorporated community of Twin Lakes, a residential area on either side of State Route 43 just south of Sugar Bush Knolls. Immediately south of Twin Lakes is the location of the historical town of Earlville which existed primarily in the 19th and early 20th centuries as a stop on the Cleveland and Pittsburgh Railroad. The census-designated place of Brady Lake, which is part of the township and includes the former village of Brady Lake and its surrounding area, is in the eastern part of the township. Originally, Franklin Township covered approximately 25 square miles (65 km^{2}). Most of the city of Kent and a small part of Sugar Bush Knolls occupy land that was once part of the township. Sugar Bush Knolls withdrew in 1965 and both Kent and Brady Lake formally separated from the township in 1993. Brady Lake returned to the township after it was dissolved as a municipality and a paper township in 2017. Franklin Township is included in the Akron Metropolitan Statistical Area and the larger Cleveland-Akron-Elyria Combined Statistical Area.

Located on the western end of the Glaciated Allegheny Plateau, the topography of Franklin Township includes rolling hills and varied terrain. Lake Rockwell, the main drinking water source for the city of Akron, is in the northeastern part of the township. It was created in 1913 and impounds water from the Cuyahoga River, covering approximately 1.3 square miles (3.4 km^{2}). In addition to Lake Rockwell, there are seven natural kettle lakes in the township. The largest, Lake Pippen, is owned by the city of Akron as an unused part of the city's water supply. Brady Lake, located in the southeastern part of the township, is used for recreation along with East Twin Lake and West Twin Lake, which straddle each side of State Route 43 in the northern part of the township. The United States Geological Survey lists the township's elevation at 1,106 feet (337 m) above sea level at a point inside the Kent city limits near the township's original geographic center. According to the United States Census Bureau, as of 2021 the township has an area of 14.3 square miles (37 km^{2}) of which 12.5 square miles (32 km^{2}) is land and 1.8 square miles (4.7 km^{2}) water.

=== Climate ===
Franklin Township's climate is classified as a humid continental climate in the Dfa Köppen climate classification meaning it typically has very warm, humid summers and cold, snowy winters with moderate and variable spring and autumn seasons. During the spring and summer months, thunderstorms are fairly common and the area is susceptible to tornadoes. Effects from tropical systems can also be felt, usually taking the form of increased humidity, rain, and wind, such as with the remnants of Hurricane Ike in September 2008. During the winter months, snowfall is common and can occur in large quantities with considerable cloud cover. Franklin Township is not considered part of the Lake Erie snowbelt, though lake-effect snow does occur at times. The township is in what is referred to as the "secondary snowbelt", meaning it will receive heavier snowfall totals from lake-effect snow when certain wind directions are more prevalent, but typically sees far less snowfall than areas to the north closer to Lake Erie. While temperatures below the freezing point are typical in the winter months, thaw periods where temperatures exceed 50 °F (10 °C) and even 60 °F (16 °C) are not uncommon in January and February.

Climate data for Kent, Ohio
| Month | Jan | Feb | Mar | Apr | May | Jun | Jul | Aug | Sep | Oct | Nov | Dec | Year |
|---|---|---|---|---|---|---|---|---|---|---|---|---|---|
| Record high °F (°C) | 65 (18) | 70 (21) | 81 (27) | 88 (31) | 94 (34) | 101 (38) | 103 (39) | 100 (38) | 95 (35) | 84 (29) | 76 (24) | 72 (22) | 103 (39) |
| Mean daily maximum °F (°C) | 34 (1) | 38 (3) | 48 (9) | 60 (16) | 72 (22) | 80 (27) | 84 (29) | 82 (28) | 74 (23) | 62 (17) | 50 (10) | 39 (4) | 60 (16) |
| Mean daily minimum °F (°C) | 20 (−7) | 23 (−5) | 30 (−1) | 40 (4) | 51 (11) | 60 (16) | 64 (18) | 63 (17) | 56 (13) | 45 (7) | 36 (2) | 26 (−3) | 43 (6) |
| Record low °F (°C) | −22 (−30) | −6 (−21) | 1 (−17) | 17 (−8) | 30 (−1) | 39 (4) | 44 (7) | 43 (6) | 30 (−1) | 25 (−4) | 2 (−17) | −12 (−24) | −22 (−30) |
| Average precipitation inches (mm) | 2.02 (51) | 2.00 (51) | 2.85 (72) | 3.15 (80) | 3.61 (92) | 3.13 (80) | 3.87 (98) | 3.36 (85) | 3.57 (91) | 2.46 (62) | 3.22 (82) | 2.83 (72) | 36.07 (916) |
Source: The Weather Channel

== Demographics ==
Initial population growth in Franklin Township was influenced by the location on the Cuyahoga River which led to the development of industrial and manufacturing jobs. Early settlers mainly came from the northeastern United States and were largely of German descent.

As of the 2020 Census, there were 6,283 people, 2,399 households, and 1,415 families residing in the township. The population density was 436.3 inhabitants per square mile (168.5/km^{2}). There were 3,074 housing units at an average density of 213.4 per square mile (82.4/km^{2}). The racial makeup of the township was 93.7% White, 2.0% African American, 2.2% Asian, 0.2% Native American, 0.03% Pacific Islander, 0.3% from other races, and 1.6% from two or more races. 0.7% of the population is Hispanic or Latino of any race.

There were 2,174 households, out of which 28.2% had children under the age of 18 living with them, 54.6% were married couples living together, 6.1% had a female householder with no husband present, and 36.5% were non-families. 27.3% of all households were made up of individuals, and 4.6% had someone living alone who was 65 years of age or older. The average household size was 2.42 and the average family size was 2.99.

In the township the population was spread out, with 21.6% under the age of 18, 14.1% from 18 to 24, 26.6% from 25 to 44, 26.8% from 45 to 64, and 11.0% who were 65 years of age or older. The median age was 37.4 years, slightly above both the median age for Ohio (36.2) and the United States (35.3), but significantly above the median age for the city of Kent (22.9). For every 100 females there were 104.3 males. For every 100 females age 18 and over, there were 101.4 males.

The median income for a household in the township was $47,750, and the median income for a family was $64,792. This compared with Ohio's median household income of $40,956 and $41,994 for the United States. Males had a median income of $43,281 versus $27,262 for females. The per capita income for the township was $28,656. About 2.8% of families and 10.0% of the population were below the poverty line, including 6.4% of those under age 18 and 0.5% of those age 65 or over. These are slightly below the levels for both the state and national averages, with 10.6% of individuals in Ohio and 12.4% in the United States being below the poverty line and 7.8% of families in Ohio and 9.2% in the United States.

Educationally, like Kent, Franklin Township is above the national, state, and local averages for residents who have attained a bachelor's, master's, or above a master's degree. At the 2000 Census, approximately 42.9% of the township's population above the age of 25 had obtained a college degree compared to 37.1% of Kent's population, 21.0% of the population of Portage County, 21.2% statewide, and 24.4% nationally.

== Economy ==
The location of Franklin Township along the Cuyahoga River and later the Pennsylvania and Ohio Canal and multiple railroad lines made it attractive initially for the establishment of small gristmills and factories. Progressively larger factories would later develop due to increased power potential of the river and later due to the ease and lower cost of transportation of goods to other markets. During the latter half of the 19th century and into the early 20th century, the township's largest employers were all industrially based, including the Atlantic and Great Western Railroad and its successors, which operated its main maintenance shops in the village; the Seneca Chain Company; and bus manufacturer Twin Coach among others.

Changes in the structure of the railroad and declines in the manufacturing sector during the mid-20th century combined with the rapid growth of Kent State University following World War II led to the university becoming Portage County's largest employer and influencing the development of other areas of the township's economy. Kent State University operates Centennial Research Park, along Ohio State Route 59 in the Joint Economic Development District with Kent, which houses two high tech start-up companies in the liquid crystal industry.

As of 2000, the educational, health, and social services fields were the township's largest sector, and employed approximately 29% of the workforce. 17.8% is employed in manufacturing, with 13.6% in retail. Arts and entertainment accounts for 7.9% of the workforce with 7.3% in professional and management services.

86.1% of those employed commuted alone to work by way of a car, truck, or van with another 6.8% carpooling. 2.2% of workers walked to work with 0.4% using public transportation. The average commute time was approximately 20 minutes.

== Government ==
The township is governed by a three-member board of trustees, who are elected in November of odd-numbered years to a four-year term beginning on the following 1 January. Two are elected in the year after the presidential election and one is elected in the year before it. There is also an elected township fiscal officer, who serves a four-year term beginning on 1 April of the year after the election, which is held in November of the year before the presidential election. Vacancies in the fiscal officership or on the board of trustees are filled by the remaining trustees. As of 2022, the trustees are Kellie Kapusta, Glenn Russell, and Scott Swan, and the fiscal officer is Lisé Russell.

At the state level, Franklin Township is part of the 75th district of the Ohio House of Representatives, represented by Republican Gail Pavliga of Randolph since 2021. In the State Senate, Franklin Township is part of the 18th district, represented since by Republican Jerry Cirino of Kirtland since 2021.

At the Federal level, the township is part of Ohio's 13th congressional district, represented by Democrat Tim Ryan of Howland.

== Education ==
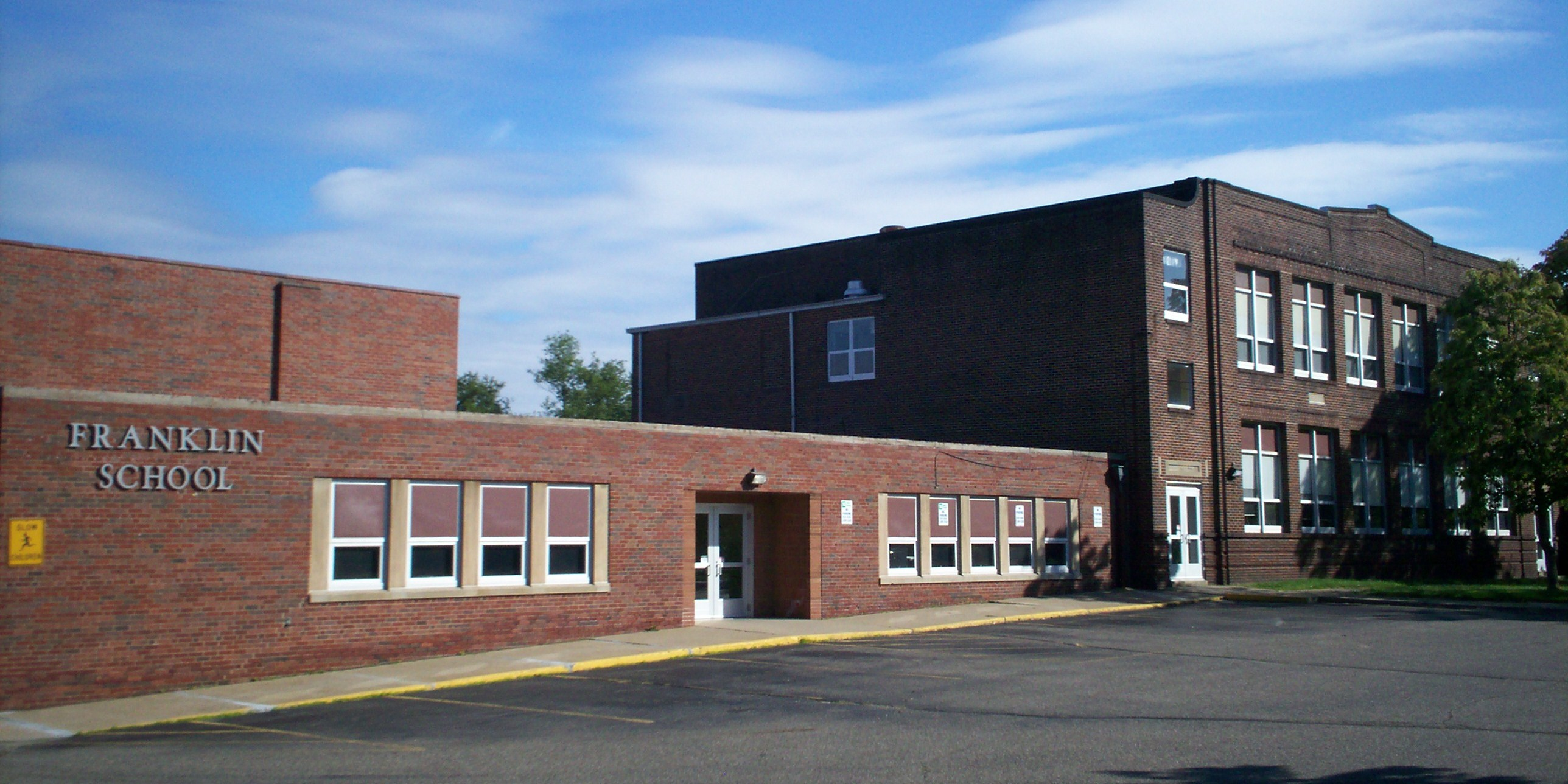
The former Franklin Elementary School, located on the border between Kent and Franklin Township. It was closed in 2014 and demolished in 2022.

Preschool, elementary, and secondary education is mainly provided by the Kent City School District with a small portion of the northwest part of the township served by the neighboring Stow-Munroe Falls City School District. Franklin Township operated its own school district until 1959 when it merged with the Kent City School District and the Brady Lake School District. In addition to serving most of Kent and Franklin Township, the Kent City School District also includes the village of Sugar Bush Knolls and a small part of southern Streetsboro. The district has four neighborhood elementary schools that serve students in grades K–5, Stanton Middle School for grades 6–8, and Theodore Roosevelt High School for grades 9–12. Kent Schools also operates a preschool program housed at Davey Elementary School, and is a member of the Six District Educational Compact with five surrounding districts to facilitate vocational education with many of these programs housed at Theodore Roosevelt High School. In 1985, Theodore Roosevelt High School was given the United States Department of Education Excellence in Education award and the school has been rated "Excellent" by the Ohio Department of Education since 2004. In December 2009, it was named in U.S. News & World Report as one of the best high schools in the United States, earning the publication's Bronze Medal designation. The Kent City School District has been consistently rated as "Excellent" or "Effective" by the Ohio Department of Education and in 2007 Walls Elementary School was named a "School of Promise" by the Ohio Department of Education, while Longcoy Elementary earned the U.S. Department of Education's prestigious Blue Ribbon School award.

== Media ==
Franklin Township is part of the Cleveland-Akron Television Market Area as defined by the Federal Communications Commission, which includes a 17-county region of Northeast Ohio. It currently ranks as the 18th-largest media market in the United States according to Nielsen Media Research. While most stations are located in Cleveland and Akron, Franklin Township is home to the studios for WAOH and W35AX, local affiliates for the Retro Television Network. Franklin Township is also in range of the television stations that broadcast out of Youngstown.

For radio, Franklin Township is part of the Akron Radio Market, though it is within range of major stations in the Cleveland Radio Market as well as many in the Youngstown-Warren and Canton markets. Two stations licensed to the city of Kent, one FM and one AM, are located in Franklin Township. WNIR, at 100.1 FM, is broadcast from studios shared with sister station WJMP and television stations WAOH and W35AX. WNIR is centered on talk radio and news and is a local affiliate of ABC Radio and Westwood One. It also the flagship station for Kent State football and men's basketball broadcasts. WJMP, which broadcasts at 1520 AM, is a daytime-only news/talk station.

The Record-Courier, a daily paper based in Kent which covers news for Portage County, is the main source of printed media for Franklin Township. The Record-Courier was formed by the merger of the Ravenna Evening Record and the Kent Courier-Tribune. The township is also served by Kent State University's Daily Kent Stater, which is available in select locations on and off campus and online via KentWired.com, a collaborative site with TV-2 and Black Squirrel Radio. The Akron Beacon Journal and The Plain Dealer also serve Franklin Township through regional coverage and delivery.

== Infrastructure ==
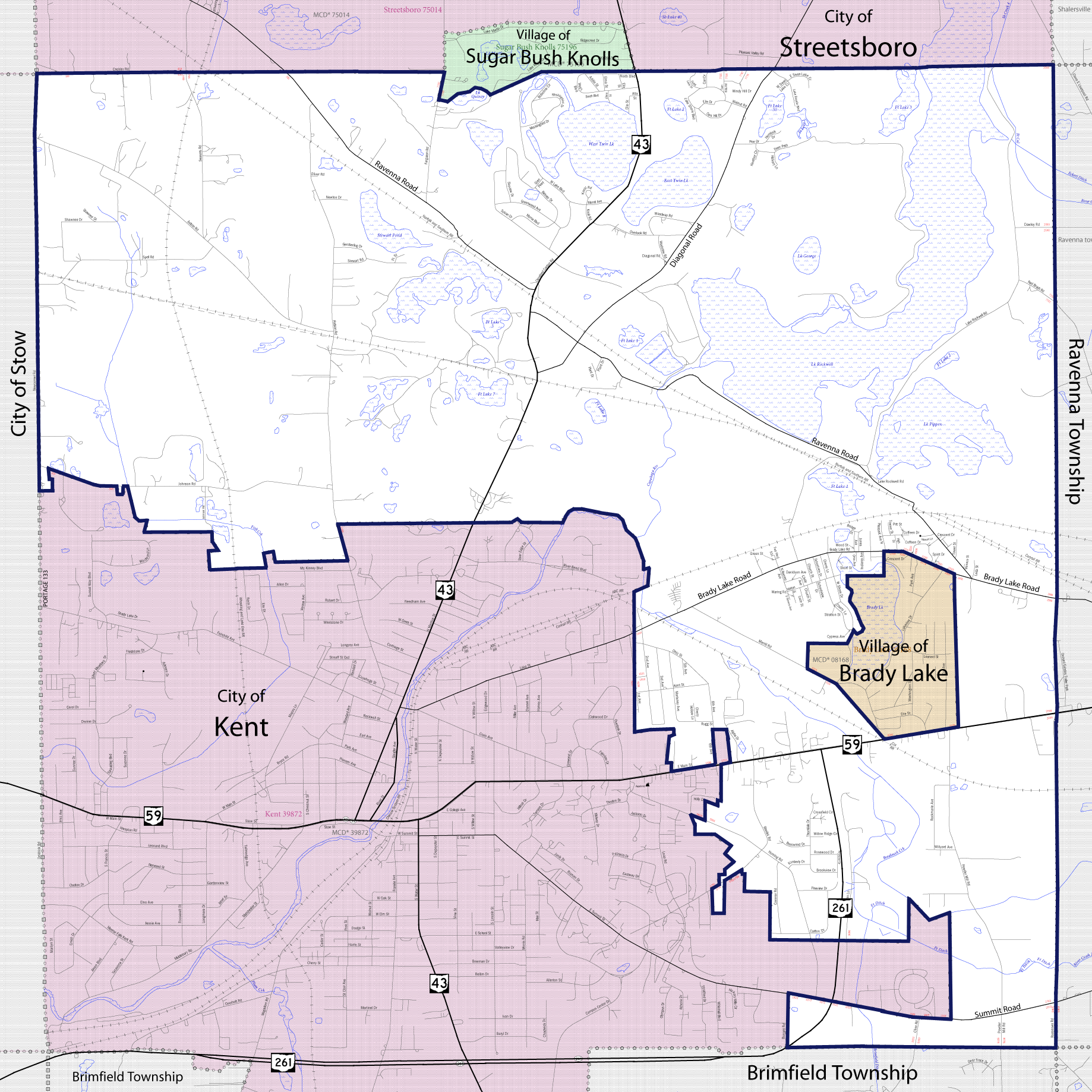
Map showing the boundaries of Franklin Township prior to the dissolution of the village of Brady Lake in 2017 and a 2022 annexation from Kent, with selected streets labeled

The township provides limited services to residents including curbside recycling pickup, seasonal leaf and Christmas tree pickup, chipping and mulching, and road maintenance. Waste collection is handled individually and township residents maintain their own wells and septic systems. Portage County handles the township's curbside recycling collection. Within the boundaries of the Joint Economic Development District with the city of Kent along State Route 59, water and sewer service is provided by Kent. Local phone utilities are provided through AT&T Ohio through the 330 and 234 area codes, electricity is supplied and lines are maintained by FirstEnergy in the former coverage area of Ohio Edison, and natural gas is supplied and lines are maintained by Dominion Resources East Ohio Energy. While residents are free to choose their own natural gas and electric suppliers, the township is part of the Northeast Ohio Public Energy Council, or NOPEC, the largest government aggregation in the United States.

=== Transportation ===
State Route 59, Summit Road, and Brady Lake Road are the main east–west highways providing links to neighboring Kent and Ravenna while Ravenna Road connects the township with Hudson. State Route 43 is the main north–south highway with Diagonal Road a secondary road northeast to Mantua via Streetsboro. SR 43 connects Franklin Township with Interstate 76, approximately 3 miles (4.8 km) to the south via exit 33 in Brimfield and to the Ohio Turnpike/Interstate 80 and the eastern terminus of Interstate 480, approximately 7 miles (11 km) to the north via Turnpike exit 187 in Streetsboro. SR 43 is a two lane road in the township and widens to four and five lanes in Kent. SR 59 is a three-lane road before widening to five lanes just east of the junction with State Route 261. State Route 261 passes through the southeastern part of the township as a two-lane highway mainly running north–south before turning to an east–west direction and widening to a four-lane divided highway for a short distance in northern Brimfield Township and southern Kent. It serves as a bypass of Kent between SR 43, SR 59, and Summit Street and connects the township to Tallmadge on the southwest.

Public transportation is provided by the Portage Area Regional Transportation Authority, known as PARTA, which is headquartered in the township along Summit Road. PARTA serves Franklin Township through a dial-a-ride service, the seasonal Black Squirrel route along SR 59 during Kent State University's Fall and Spring semesters, and the Interurban connecting with Stow and Ravenna.

=== Healthcare ===
Hospital care is provided mainly through Robinson Memorial Hospital. The 150-bed main hospital is located in Ravenna and the system operates additional facilities throughout Portage County. The township is home to one free clinic, Portage Community Health Center, located along State Route 59 in the Joint Economic Development District with Kent.

== Notable people ==
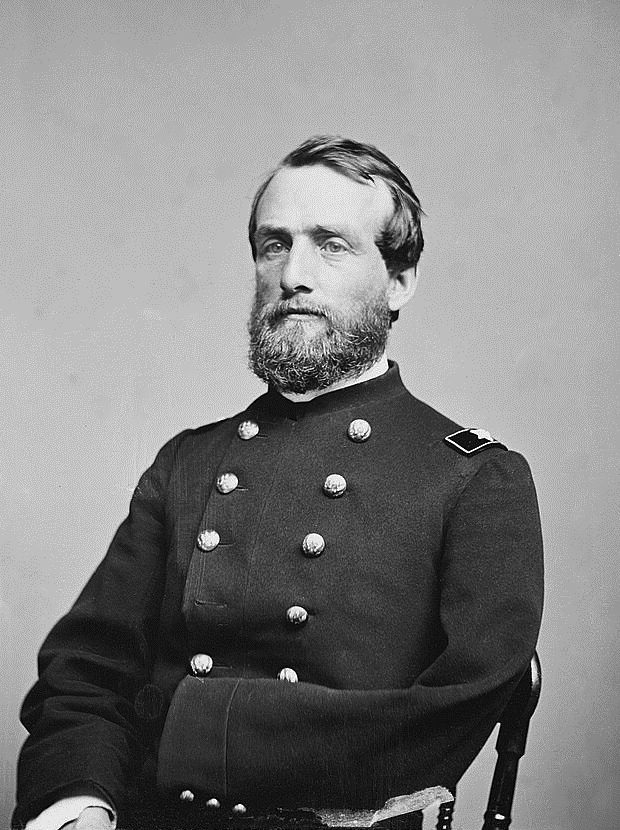
Lucius Fairchild, Governor of Wisconsin from 1866 to 1872, was born in 1831 in a part of the township that is now within the boundaries of Kent

Although the city of Kent incorporated in 1867 and the village of Brady Lake would follow in 1927, until 1993, the U.S. Census Bureau counted most of the population of Kent and all of Brady Lake as the "incorporated portions" of Franklin Township. As such, the township has produced and been home to a number of notable individuals in varying fields, most of whom are more associated with Kent or Brady Lake. John Davey, a pioneer in tree surgery and founder of the Davey Tree Expert Company moved to Kent/Franklin Township in the 1880s. His son, Martin L. Davey, would later serve as Governor of Ohio and a U.S. Representative. Other political figures to come from Kent/Franklin Township include Wisconsin governor Lucius Fairchild, former U.S. Representative Robert E. Cook, and noted abolitionist John Brown, who lived in the township from 1835 to 1839. Noted athletes to have come from Kent/Franklin Township include former National Football League players Mike Adamle, Tom DeLeone, and Stan White and former Major League Baseball player, manager, and executive Gene Michael. Professional golfer Ben Curtis, a Kent State University alumnus, has been a resident of the township since 2011. Rod Reisman, a member of the band Devo, which debuted in Kent in 1973 and was founded by Kent State University students, is a native of Kent/Franklin Township. Other performing artists to come from Kent/Franklin Township include singer Julianne Baird, playwright Vincent J. Cardinal, and voice actor Joshua Seth. Lucien Price, an author and writer for The Boston Evening Transcript and The Atlantic Monthly grew up in the area and used the pseudonym "Woolwick" for Kent in some of his stories. Kent/Franklin Township was also the home of inventor Lucien B. Smith, regarded as the inventor of barbed wire. Additionally, many notable people have lived in Kent/Franklin Township while attending Kent State University, among them comedians Drew Carey and Arsenio Hall, actor Michael Keaton, musician Joe Walsh, and additional members of the band Devo. Notable athletes include football player Jack Lambert; Major League Baseball players Thurman Munson and Rich Rollins; and college football coaches Nick Saban and Lou Holtz.
