= Brady Lake =

Brady Lake may refer to:

- Brady Creek Reservoir, also known as "Brady Lake", in McCulloch County, Texas, United States
- Brady Lake, Ohio, a village in the United States
- Brady Lake (Ohio), its lake
