= Circle Track Summer =

- DVD cover art
- Directed by: Steve Pallotta
- Written by: Mike Martone; Steve Pallotta
- Produced by: Steve Pallotta
- Starring: JodyMarie Spiech; Tony Rio; Jenna Christie; Heather Ley; Lindsay Robertson
- Cinematography: Christopher Parker
- Edited by: Guido Huckball
- Music by: Major Buzz and the 60 Cycle Hum
- Production company: Fools Gold Entertainment
- Distributed by: CustomFlix
- Release date: July 29, 2005 (Barberton, Ohio)
- Running time: 97 minutes
- Country: United States
- Language: English
- Budget: $5,000

Circle Track Summer is a 2005 American action comedy film about auto racing. It was directed by independent film maker Steve Pallotta and featured an appearance by Brian Lisik. Tom Erickson of WNIR also stars in the movie.

== Plot ==
The owner of a failing race track seeks to reverse his fortune by holding a series of promotion events where the cars are driven by women. Becky is a waitress who unknowingly puts her life in danger while attempting to save the family farm. She had rediscovered her lost high-school sweetheart, reporter Scoop Hendrickson, and must decide whether or not to tell him of what ended their romance. To raise money to save the farm, she and three other financially strapped but voluptuous local girls, Su Shi, Tammy Lay and Jette Black, sign up for a new Powder-Puff auto racing event at the Barberton Speedway in hopes of winning cold, hard cash. The promotional catch developed by the track owner is that the women must wear bikinis as they race, and must drive the cars backwards.

== Cast ==
- JodyMarie Spiech as Becky Smith
- Tony Rio as Scoop Hendrickson
- Lindsay Robertson as Jette Black
- Heather Ley as Tammy Lay
- Jenna Christie as Su Shi
- Tom Jenny as Kooter
- Ruben Ryan as Opossum
- Thor Syvertsen as Bud
- Robert Keith as Mr. Black
- Fig Jankowski as Chain Drive
- Doug Cusit as Uncle Bob
- Roger Samblanet as Uncle Dan
- Phil Skoff as Metal Gate
- Paul Sherman as Anthony
- Dave Zimmerman as Cookie
- Tami Bowman as Caprice Black
- Barbara Evans as Mary
- Sherman Montgomery Jr. as Anthony
- Jacquelane Nespo as Summer
- Ada Carolina Ortiz as Djanga
- Tom Erickson as Track Announcer
- Richard Rolenz as Rocco
- Tom Rush as Deputy Sheriff
- Rick Montgomery as Hairdresser's ghost
- Steve Pallotta as himself

== Production ==
At the 2004 debut of Pallotta's film Lake Evermore, Palotta announced his plans to film Circle Track Summer as "a launching pad for a commercial filmmaking career", with plans to have it air on a cable network and eventually be released to home video. Filming occurred over a 14-month period at the Barberton Raceway in Barberton, Ohio. With most of cast and crew working for free, the film was made on a micro-budget of under $10,000, and was one of the first independent films shot by cinematographer Christopher Parker on the Panasonic DVX100 digital video camera. The film was edited in a room in the director's house and music was provided by musician friends of the director.

The project was shot entirely on location in the Akron, Ohio area, with more than 200 locals involved in the one-year filming. The project's costume design was done by Susie Smith, known for her award-winning work on St. Elsewhere.

The film features WNIR radio talk show personalities, Stan Piatt, Maggie Fuller, Tom Erickson, Phil Fergusson, and Bob Earley. The film also includes cameo appearances by Akron Beacon-Journal columnist Bob Dyer, Bob Golic, Cuyahoga Falls then-mayor Don Robart and Nina Rawls, wife of Lou Rawls.

== Release ==
The film premiered at Barberton's West Theatre on July 29, 2005. It was released on DVD on March 19, 2006, and screened April 14, 2007 at the Akron Independent Film Festival.

== Reception ==
Sue Todd of Record-Courier wrote that the film had "a little too much going on at times", but noted "any perceived faults really are more a matter of individual taste (Lost In Translation it’s not) and tolerance for ethnic jokes, sexual innuendo and nudity." She praised the "willingness of the filmmakers to take a chance by poking fun at every known stereotype of Ohioans, and especially of natives of Barberton".

In 2011, the Barberton Herald described the film as a "Local Cult Favorite".
