= Black Horse, Ohio =

- Unincorporated area
- Location in Ohio and the United States Black Horse, Ohio (the United States)
- Coordinates: 41°09′32″N 81°16′23″W
- Country: United States
- State: Ohio
- County: Portage
- Township: Ravenna
- Named for: Black Horse Tavern
- Elevation: 1,076 ft (328 m)
- Time zone: UTC−5 (EST)
  - Summer (DST): UTC−4 (EDT)
- ZIP codes: 44266
- Area codes: 330, 234
- GNIS feature ID: 1064442

Black Horse, also spelled Blackhorse, is an unincorporated community in Portage County, Ohio, United States. It is located in western Ravenna Township and centered along Ohio State Route 59 at its intersection with Brady Lake Road, just west of the city limits of Ravenna. The community takes its name from the Black Horse Tavern, which was located on the north side of modern-day State Route 59 for much of the 19th century.

== History ==
During the early settlement of the Connecticut Western Reserve, the Black Horse Tavern was a regular stop for stagecoaches heading west towards Kent, Cuyahoga Falls, and Akron as it was located at a fork in the trail. The tavern was built by David Greer, an early settler of Ravenna, sometime after his arrival in 1810. He operated it until 1834, when he sold it to a man named Backus, who is responsible to giving the tavern its name. The Black Horse name is believed to originate from one of two taverns of the same name in Massachusetts, either in Marlborough or Concord.

The tavern operated until 1894, when township residents voted to outlaw taverns and saloons, and around 1900, the building burned down. A new Black Horse Tavern was built on the south side of the road, a building that stood until 2014. The area was nearly renamed "Five Corners" in 1915, in reference to the intersection of modern-day State Route 59, Brady Lake Road, Wall Street, and Hoover Road, which was then the northern end of Lakewood Road. The change was opposed by several residents and the Ravenna Republican.
