= John and Sally Haymaker =

Early 1800s settlers of Ohio

John and Sarah Sally Haymaker were early white settlers of Ohio and are considered the founders of Franklin Township and what would become the city of Kent, Ohio. The Haymakers, who were of German descent, moved west from Warren, Ohio, to Franklin Township in the Connecticut Western Reserve in early November 1805, shortly after Ohio had become a state. They came after Jacob Haymaker, the father of John Haymaker, had visited the area in early 1805 and purchased a tract of land along the Cuyahoga River from Aaron Olmsted, the original proprietor of the township. John and Sally, along with their children Eve, Catherine, and Jacob, were the first of several Haymakers to come to Franklin Township.

== Background ==
Prior to coming to Franklin Township, the Haymakers lived in Pittsburgh before moving briefly to Warren, Ohio. John was born in 1774 in York, Pennsylvania, and Sally, whose full name is Sarah Sally Leggett, was born in Pennsylvania in 1775. Their first child, Eva or "Evie", was born in Beaver, Pennsylvania, in 1800, followed by Catherine in 1803 and Jacob in Pittsburgh in February 1805. They came to Warren sometime after the birth of Jacob and stayed there until October 1805, when they left for Franklin Township, arriving sometime in early to mid November. For the winter, the family stayed in a primitive hut, located in what is now northern Kent, that had been built in 1803 by the survey team.

The following spring, the Haymakers moved to their land along the Cuyahoga River, just south of what is now downtown Kent. Jacob and Eva Haymaker arrived, along with Jacob's son and John's brother George Haymaker and his wife Rebecca. The family built a log cabin along the river and planted crops. Later in 1806 or early in 1807, Frederick Haymaker, another son of Jacob and brother to John and George, came to Franklin Township and purchased land in what is now northern Kent. The Haymakers built a gristmill in 1807 to take advantage of a nearby waterfall, and later that year, on September 11, Sally gave birth to John Franklin Haymaker, the first white child born in Franklin Township. Sally gave birth to a daughter Emily on November 26, 1809. Eva Haymaker, the wife of Jacob Haymaker and the mother of John, George, and Frederick, died in 1810, the first recorded death in Franklin Township.

The Haymakers sold the mill and some of the surrounding land to Jacob Reed in 1811, but mostly stayed in the community. In 1817 Reed sold the property to George B. DePeyster and William H. Price, who helped develop the villages of Carthage in the north and Franklin Mills in the south. These two villages would eventually grow to become today's Kent, Ohio.

== Legacy ==
Haymaker Parkway, a section of Ohio State Route 59 that serves as one of the main east-west thoroughfares in Kent, is named for John and Sally Haymaker. It opened in 1975 as a rerouting of SR 59 to bypass downtown Kent and to provide bridges over all railroad tracks in the city. The roadway and the western abutment of the largest bridge, which spans two railroad lines and the Cuyahoga River, are adjacent to the original Haymaker property. The name was one of 40 suggested for the roadway when it opened, and was finally recommended by the city's Community Development Committee in December 1976. It was officially named for the Haymakers in January 1977, the first memorial in Kent of any kind for them.

Kent's oldest farmers' market, established in 1992, is known as the Haymaker Farmers' Market. It is held every Saturday from April through November outdoors along Franklin Avenue under the Redmond Greer Bridge of Haymaker Parkway. From December through March, the market moves to an indoor venue, which has varied over the years.

== See also ==
- History of Kent, Ohio
