= Brady Lake, Ohio =

- Census-designated place
- Historic postcard of Brady Lake

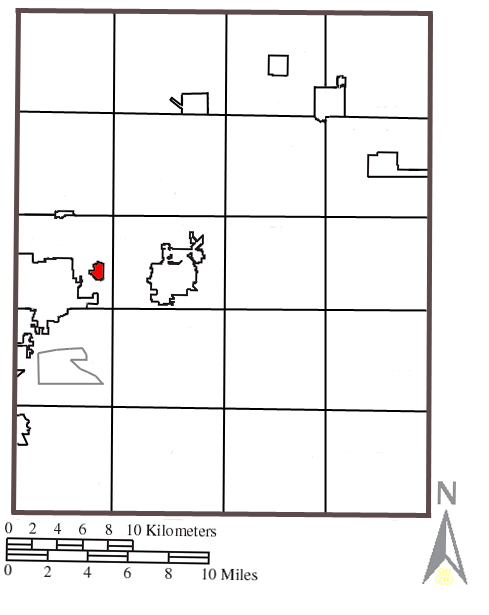
- Location in Portage County showing former village boundaries

- Location in Ohio
- Coordinates: 41°09′51″N 81°18′57″W
- Country: United States
- State: Ohio
- County: Portage
- Founded: 1891
- Incorporated: 1927
- Dissolved: 2017
- CDP created: 2019

Area
  - Total: 1.44 sq mi (3.74 km^{2})
  - Land: 1.32 sq mi (3.43 km^{2})
  - Water: 0.12 sq mi (0.31 km^{2})
- Elevation: 1,050 ft (320 m)

Population (2020)
  - Total: 1,222
  - Density: 923/sq mi (356.2/km^{2})
- Time zone: UTC-5 (Eastern (EST))
  - Summer (DST): UTC-4 (EDT)
- ZIP code: 44240, 44266
- Area codes: 330, 234
- FIPS code: 39-08168
- GNIS feature ID: 2803718

Brady Lake is an unincorporated census-designated place and former village in Portage County, Ohio, United States. The population was 1,222 at the 2020 census. Incorporated in 1927, it originally developed as an amusement park and summer resort that opened in 1891. It was formed from a small portion of Franklin Township and became fully independent of the township in 1993. The village was named after the lake it borders, Brady Lake, which in turn was named for Captain Samuel Brady, who hid in the lake around 1780 while being pursued by a band of local Native Americans.

Residents voted to dissolve the village on May 2, 2017, and the area was again made part of Franklin Township. In 2019, the United States Census Bureau created the Brady Lake census-designated place (CDP), an area that includes the entire former village as well as the immediate surrounding area. The CDP is part of the Akron metropolitan area.

== Geography ==
According to the United States Census Bureau, in 2010 the village had a total area of 0.41 square miles (1.06 km^{2}), of which 0.31 square miles (0.80 km^{2}) was land and 0.10 square miles (0.26 km^{2}) was water.

The community is situated along the southern and eastern shores of Brady Lake.

=== Nearby communities ===
Located in west-central Portage County, the village of Brady Lake only physically bordered Franklin Township, which completely surrounded the village. The larger CDP borders Kent on the west and Ravenna Township on the east. Other nearby communities include:

- Ravenna to the east
- Brimfield Township to the south
- Streetsboro and Sugar Bush Knolls to the north

=== Transportation ===
Ohio State Route 59 skirts the southern edge of Brady Lake for a short distance just east of the Kent city limits. It, along with Brady Lake Road along the north side of the community, are the main roads connecting the area with Kent and Ravenna. For public transportation, it is served by the Portage Area Regional Transportation Authority (PARTA).

=== ZIP and area codes ===
Until September 2019, Brady Lake had its own post office and ZIP code (Brady Lake, OH 44211), though it was a contracted post office and was only used for mailbox rentals with PO box addresses. The eastern part of the community is in the Ravenna, OH 44266 ZIP code while the western side uses the Kent, OH 44240 ZIP code for home-delivered mail.

For telephone use, Brady Lake is part of the 330 and 234 and area codes, which includes the Akron-Canton and Youngstown areas of Northeast Ohio.

== Demographics ==
Historical population
Census	Pop.	Note	%±
1930	78		—
1940	166		112.8%
1950	444		167.5%
1960	544		22.5%
1970	450		−17.3%
1980	470		4.4%
1990	490		4.3%
2000	513		4.7%
2010	464		−9.6%
2020	1,222	(Note: Population is for the CDP, which includes the entire former village along with a larger surrounding area)	163.4%
U.S. Decennial Census

=== 2010 census ===
As of the census of 2010, there were 464 people, 201 households, and 130 families residing in the village. The population density was 1,496.8 inhabitants per square mile (577.9/km^{2}). There were 226 housing units at an average density of 729.0 per square mile (281.5/km^{2}). The racial makeup of the village was 94.4% White, 0.2% African American, 1.3% Native American, 1.1% Asian, and 3.0% from two or more races. Hispanic or Latino of any race were 0.9% of the population.

There were 201 households, of which 21.9% had children under the age of 18 living with them, 50.7% were married couples living together, 10.4% had a female householder with no husband present, 3.5% had a male householder with no wife present, and 35.3% were non-families. 24.4% of all households were made up of individuals, and 9.5% had someone living alone who was 65 years of age or older. The average household size was 2.31 and the average family size was 2.67.

The median age in the village was 47.4 years. 14.9% of residents were under the age of 18; 11.1% were between the ages of 18 and 24; 21.1% were from 25 to 44; 39.9% were from 45 to 64; and 12.9% were 65 years of age or older. The gender makeup of the village was 51.9% male and 48.1% female.

=== 2000 census ===
As of the census of 2000, there were 513 people, 202 households, and 148 families residing in the village. The population density was 1,625.6 inhabitants per square mile (627.6/km^{2}). There were 212 housing units at an average density of 671.8 per square mile (259.4/km^{2}). The racial makeup of the village was 96.49% White, 1.56% African American, 0.78% Native American, 0.58% from other races, and 0.58% from two or more races. Hispanic or Latino of any race were 0.78% of the population.

There were 202 households, out of which 35.1% had children under the age of 18 living with them, 58.9% were married couples living together, 11.9% had a female householder with no husband present, and 26.7% were non-families. 23.3% of all households were made up of individuals, and 7.4% had someone living alone who was 65 years of age or older. The average household size was 2.54 and the average family size was 3.00.

In the village, the population was spread out, with 24.8% under the age of 18, 7.8% from 18 to 24, 27.5% from 25 to 44, 29.4% from 45 to 64, and 10.5% who were 65 years of age or older. The median age was 40 years. For every 100 females, there were 96.6 males. For every 100 females age 18 and over, there were 93.0 males.

The median income for a household in the village was $36,406, and the median income for a family was $47,917. Males had a median income of $36,667 versus $26,641 for females. The per capita income for the village was $19,357. About 3.5% of families and 3.8% of the population were below the poverty line, including 3.7% of those under age 18 and 4.5% of those age 65 or over.

== Education ==
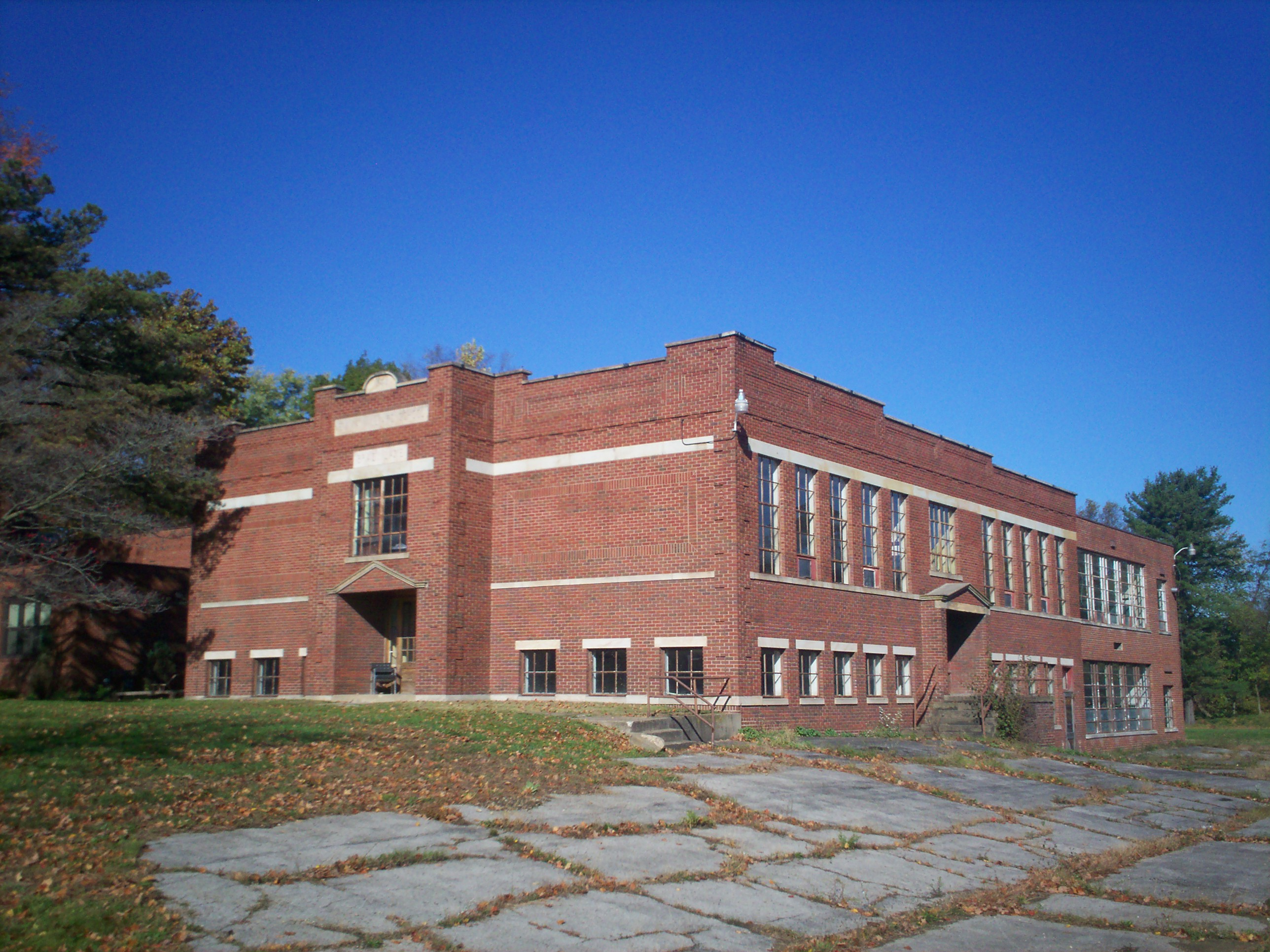
Emma Williard School in 2011

Brady Lake is part of the Kent City School District, which it has been a part of since 1959. Prior to that time Brady Lake operated its own school district, the Brady Lake Local School District, with all students attending a small schoolhouse. The school later served as an early "model school" for teachers in training at the new Kent State Normal School from 1913 through the 1920s. A new building opened in 1923, named for Emma Williard, who donated for the building's construction. Williard School initially served students in grades 1–11, but later in the 1920s, high school students were sent to Theodore Roosevelt High School. After merging with the Kent City Schools in 1959, Williard School functioned as an elementary school for grades 1–6 until it was closed in 1978.

== Culture ==
Prior to 2007, the town celebrated a festival called Captain Brady Day each summer. It was first held in 1972 as a way to bring all residents around the lake, both in the village and in Franklin Township, together. It was canceled in 2007 due to lack of volunteers, but revived in 2026. The Lake Brady Association disbanded in 2008, which was the main organizer. For the last several years, the village had organized a festival, car show, and flea market get-together called the Muskrat Jamboree. It was held annually in the summer at the baseball fields by Brady Lake Road.

== Dissolution ==
In a special election held on May 2, 2017, residents of Brady Lake voted 106–88 to dissolve the village. The vote came after years of controversy surrounding the village's government, including high taxes and its inability to maintain infrastructure. Following the vote, all village operations ceased immediately. At the time of the vote, local officials were uncertain about the community's future and believed that it would again become part of Franklin Township, which it did. The dissolution became official after the vote totals were certified on May 23 and signed off by Ohio Secretary of State Jon Husted in July. Portage County formally dissolved Brady Lake Township, a paper township created in 1993, in July 2017, which officially returned the area to Franklin Township jurisdiction. There was also some confusion regarding the ownership of the lake, which had previously been owned by the village. By early 2018, Franklin Township assumed full ownership of the lake.

== Notable people ==
- Eddie Morgan, former Major League Baseball player
