= Stanton Middle School =

Stanton Middle School is the name of multiple schools.

- Stanton Middle School (Kent, Ohio)
- Stanton Middle School (Wilmington, Delaware)
- Stanton Middle School, Stanton, Suffolk, England.
