= WJMP =

WJMP may refer to:

- WJMP (AM), a radio station (1070 AM) licensed to serve Plattsburgh, New York, United States
- WTLT, a radio station (1120 AM) licensed to serve Maryville, Tennessee, United States, which held the call sign WJMP from 2020 to 2021
- WJMP (Ohio), a defunct radio station (1520 AM) formerly licensed to serve Kent, Ohio, United States, which held the call sign WJMP from 1989 to 2016
