= WOCV-CD =

Television station in Cleveland

- Cleveland, Ohio; United States
- Channels: Digital: 27 (UHF); Virtual: 35
- Branding: Catchy Comedy Cleveland; Story Television Cleveland (35.2)

Programming
- Affiliations: 35.1: Catchy Comedy; for others, see § Subchannels

Ownership
- Owner: Weigel Broadcasting; (TV-49, Inc.)

History
- Founded: November 30, 1989
- First air date: May 20, 1996
- Former call signs: W35AX (1989–2015); W16DO-D (2015–2020); W27EA-D (2020–2022)
- Former channel numbers: Analog: 35 (UHF, 1996–2015); Digital: 16 (UHF, 2015–2020)
- Former affiliations: MuchMusic; Bloomberg Television; Network One (1996–1997); America One (1996–2009, secondary until 1997); Retro TV (2009–2022); Story Television (2022)
- Call sign meaning: Ohio Cleveland

Technical information
- Licensing authority: FCC
- Facility ID: 41074
- Class: CD
- ERP: 15 kW
- HAAT: 323.3 m (1,061 ft)
- Transmitter coordinates: 41°23′2″N 81°41′43″W

Links
- Public license information: Public file; LMS
- Website: catchycomedy.com/wocv

Former translator
- WAOH-CD
- Akron, Ohio; United States
- Channels: Digital: 29 (UHF); Virtual: 29

Ownership
- Owner: Media-Com, Inc.; (Media-Com Television, Inc.)

History
- Founded: July 14, 1987
- First air date: June 18, 1990
- Last air date: October 25, 2017
- Former call signs: W29AI (1987–1995); WAOH-LP (1995–2014)
- Former channel number: 29 (1990–2014)

WOCV-CD (channel 35) is a low-power, Class A television station in Cleveland, Ohio, United States, airing programming from the digital multicast network Catchy Comedy (formerly known as Decades). The station is owned by Weigel Broadcasting, and maintains a transmitter in Parma, Ohio.

WOCV-CD has some cable carriage, most notably on Charter Spectrum—channel 15 in Cleveland and channel 13 in Akron.

== History ==
=== Media-Com era ===
W29AI channel 29 was originally licensed on July 14, 1987, and did not sign on until 1990. It became WAOH-LP on August 21, 1995, and WAOH-CD on December 30, 2014. A translator of WAOH, W35AX channel 35, was licensed on November 30, 1989, and signed on in 1996. Both stations were owned and operated by Media-Com, a local radio broadcaster which also owns WNIR 100.1 FM, and owned WJMP AM 1520 in the Kent/Akron area.

WAOH was affiliated with Retro TV since 2009. Before Retro TV, it was affiliated with the America One network, with the branding of "The CAT" (for "Cleveland Akron Television"). Prior to its America One affiliation, the station had carried Bloomberg Television, MuchMusic, and Network One. Under Media-Com's ownership, the station aired a few locally produced programs (such as the Son of Ghoul).

As part of the digital transition, WAOH-CD flash-cut their signal to digital in December 2014, remaining on channel 29. W35AX signed on its digital companion signal on channel 16 on March 16, 2015, with the calls W16DO-D. The new coverage area for W16DO-D overlapped most of viewing area formerly served by WAOH-CD. The station's branding made use of the new frequency allocation, changing from "29/35" to "16/29" on station IDs.

WAOH-CD went off the air on October 25, 2017, as part of the FCC's digital repack. This shifted W16DO-D's role from translator to the sole transmitter for the station. On June 28, 2020, W16DO-D transitioned to its repacked frequency of RF channel 27, with the new callsign W27EA-D. Its virtual channel reverted to the previous 35 allocation, rather than 16, 27, or 29.

=== Weigel Broadcasting era ===
In March 2022, Media-Com petitioned the FCC to allow a sale of the station to Weigel Broadcasting. The sale included only W27EA-D, not WNIR. On June 20, 2022, the sale was completed, and W27EA-D switched its primary affiliation to Story Television.

On September 1, 2022, Weigel Broadcasting filed to change the callsign from W27EA-D to WOCV-CD. The new call letters took effect on September 20, 2022.

On November 1, 2022, the Weigel-owned Decades network began airing on 35.1, with Story Television moved to the newly activated 35.2. On March 27, 2023, Decades became Catchy Comedy, a classic sitcom focused network.

On June 12, 2024, subchannel 35.3 was activated for the June 25 launch of MeTV Toons, a new 24/7 network focused on classic animation.

On March 27, 2025, 35.4 was activated for Movies!, which was previously carried on WBNX 55.3. A few days later, 35.5 was activated on April 1, 2025 for Dabl, which was previously carried on WOIO 19.3.

== Subchannels ==
The station's signal is multiplexed:

Subchannels of WOCV-CD
Subchannel	Res.	Short name	Programming
35.1	720p	CATCHY	Catchy Comedy
35.2	720p	STORY	Story Television
35.3	480i	TOONS	MeTV Toons
35.4	480i	MOVIES	Movies!
35.5	480i	DABL	Dabl
35.6	480i	WEST	WEST
35.12	480i	EMLW	OnTV4U (infomercials)
