= Kent City School District =

School district in Ohio

Address
- 321 North DePeyster Street Kent, Ohio, 44240; United States
- Coordinates: 41°09′24″N 81°21′21″W

District information
- Type: Public
- Grades: Pre-K through 12
- Established: 1860
- Superintendent: Tom Larkin
- NCES District ID: 3904416

Students and staff
- Students: 3,233 (2024–25)
- Teachers: 181.31
- Staff: 198.95

Other information
- Website: kentschools.net

The Kent City School District is a public school district based in Kent, Ohio, United States. It serves approximately 3,100 students living in Kent, Franklin Township, Brady Lake, and Sugar Bush Knolls, as well as a small portion of southern Streetsboro. The district has seven schools including four elementary schools housing kindergarten through fifth grade with preschool housed at one elementary school; Stanton Middle School for grades 6–8; and Theodore Roosevelt High School, which houses grades 9–12. The superintendent is Tom Larkin, who began his tenure August 1, 2023. Larkin previously served as assistant superintendent and has been with the district since 1996.

== History ==
The district was formed around 1860 by merging several smaller one-room school house districts into one centralized district for the village. As Kent was still known as Franklin Mills, the district was originally known as the "Franklin Union School District". The district would continue to be known as a "Franklin Union" district even after residents voted to change the name of the village from Franklin Mills to Kent in 1864. During the 1860s, the district began to divide the students in the school houses by grade level. As a result of the curriculum and management changes, the district elected to close the schoolhouses and erect a centralized building for all grades. Although initially planned for 1868, construction delays prevented the building from opening until March 1869. During the school year leading up to the opening of the new building, which would initially be known as the "Union School" and later as "Central School," students in the high school grades were housed at the Franklin Township Hall in Kent while all other grades remained at their respective school house. The building would serve as the home of all students until growth in the community necessitated the construction of two additional elementary schools: South School in 1880 and DePeyster School in 1888. Even with the new schools, the original Union/Central building would be the home of Kent High School until 1922.

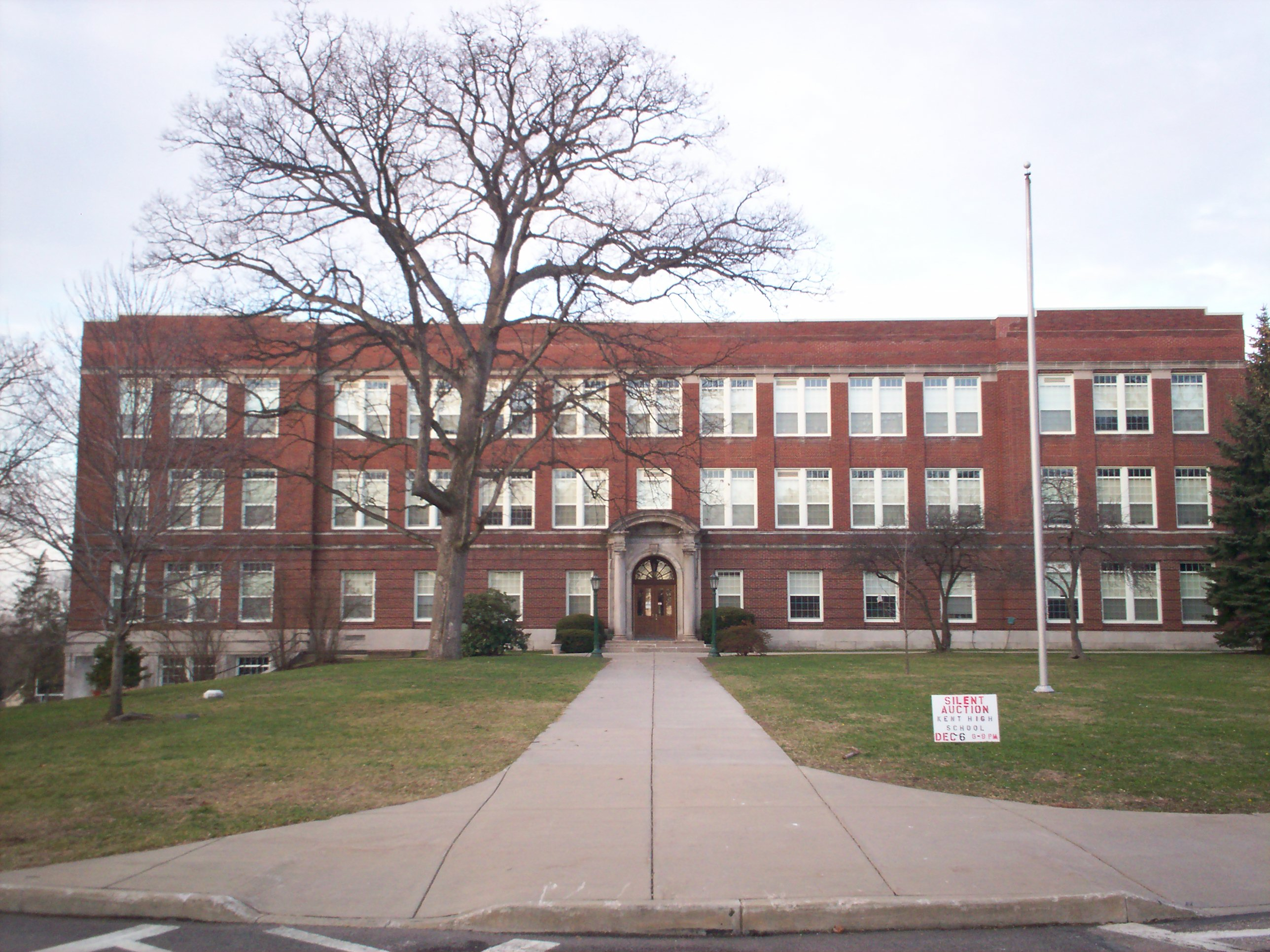
This building originally served as Theodore Roosevelt High School when it opened in 1922. It would later serve as Davey Junior High School/Davey Middle School from 1959 to 1999, and since 2000, as Davey Elementary School.

As Kent continued to grow throughout the twentieth century, new schools and changes became necessary. A new high school was built in 1922 and was named in honor of Theodore Roosevelt. The original Union School continued to be used as an elementary school known as Central School until 1953 when a new Central Elementary School was constructed on its predecessor's front yard. Following the completion of the new school, the Union School building was torn down. Additional elementary schools followed first with the construction of Longcoy Elementary School on the city's west side. By 1958 the high school had outgrown its facility, so a new high school building was built on the north side of the city. It retained the name of Theodore Roosevelt and the former high school building was rechristened as Davey Junior High School in the fall of 1959 when the new high school opened. 1959 also saw the merging of the Franklin Local School District and the Brady Lake School District into the Kent City Schools, which added two more elementary schools: Franklin Elementary and Emma Williard (Brady Lake) Elementary. The 1960s saw the last elementary schools built in Kent with the opening of Holden Elementary in 1965 on the city's south side and Walls Elementary on the east side in 1966. Most of South School was razed in 1966 following the completion of Holden except for the building's gym which was leased to the Kent Parks and Recreation Department and used as the Kent Recreation Center. Enrollment growth through the 1960s and into the 1970s resulted in additions at Walls School, Davey Junior High School, and Roosevelt High School. Also in 1970, the district entered into a cooperative agreement with the Stow-Munroe Falls, Cuyahoga Falls, Woodridge, Tallmadge, and Hudson school districts to provide vocational education. This compact, known as the Six District Compact, was the first of its kind in the state of Ohio. In 1978, ninth graders were moved from Davey to Roosevelt, Emma Williard School was closed, and the school board moved into offices in the renovated DePeyster School building.

== Facilities ==
Administrative
| Facility | Location | Head | Photo | Notes |
|---|---|---|---|---|
| District offices | 321 N. DePeyster St. 41°9′24″N 81°21′21″W | Tom Larkin, Superintendent | | Housed in the former DePeyester School since 1978 |
| Transportation Center | 1633 St. Clair Ave. 41°8′20″N 81°21′52″W | Richard Lewis | | Housed in the former Kent State University bus garage since 1997 |
| Christenson Operations Center | 1205 Brady Lake Rd. 41°9′51″N 81°20′18″W | Robert Munroe | | |

Schools
| School | Grades | Location | Principal | Faculty* | Enrollment* | Photo | Named for |
|---|---|---|---|---|---|---|---|
| Davey Elementary School | PK–5 | 196 N. Prospect St. 41°9′27″N 81°22′1″W | Abbey Bolton | 49 | 445 | | John Davey, Martin L. Davey, Paul Davey, & Martin L. Davey, Jr., notable Kent residents |
| Holden Elementary School | K–5 | 132 W. School St. 41°8′33″N 81°21′34″W | Dave Ravida | 23 | 229 | | Belle Holden, 1879 graduate of Kent High School and teacher and principal in the district, mainly at South School, 1882–1931 |
| Longcoy Elementary School | K–5 | 1069 Elno Ave. 41°8′45″N 81°22′56″W | Heidi Singer | 33 | 279 | | Harry Longcoy, previous owner of the land the school and most of the surrounding neighborhood were built on |
| Walls Elementary School | K–5 | 900 Doramor St. 41°9′29″N 81°20′43″W | David Ulbricht | 35 | 354 | | William A. Walls, principal of Kent High School, 1907–1910; Superintendent of Kent Schools, 1910–1915 & 1920–1937 |
| Stanton Middle School | 6–8 | 1175 Hudson Rd. 41°10′8″N 81°21′47″W | Kathy Scott | 94 | 655 | | Robert W. Stanton, principal of Roosevelt High School, 1952–1954; Assistant Superintendent of Kent Schools, 1958–1962; Superintendent of Kent Schools, 1962–1977 |
| Theodore Roosevelt High School | 9–12 | 1400 N. Mantua St. 41°10′8″N 81°21′22″W | Dennis Love | 137 | 1,256 | | Theodore Roosevelt, 26th President of the United States |

Former schools
| School | Grades | Location | Building status | Years operated | Notes | Photo |
|---|---|---|---|---|---|---|
| Central Elementary School | K–8; K–6; K–5 | 200 N. Mantua St. 41°9′20″N 81°21′44″W | Leased to the LEAP program and Portage Learning Centers | 1953–2000 | Used as an annex of Roosevelt High School, 2000–2014 | |
| DePeyster School | 1–6; K–6 | 321 N. DePeyster St. 41°9′24″N 81°21′21″W | Renovated for use as district offices, 1977–78 | 1888–1966 | Replaced by Walls Elementary School in 1966; Used as an annex of Davey Junior High School, 1966–67 | |
| Franklin Elementary School | 1–8; K–6; K–5 | 6662 SR 43; 41°10′17″N 81°21′8″W | Sold to Davey Tree in 2021; Razed in 2022 | 1922–2014 | Served as Franklin Township School, 1922–1960 | |
| Emma Williard/Brady Lake School | 1–11; 1–8; K–6 | 1945 Brady Lake Rd. 41°10′08″N 81°19′27″W | Sold to private developer; addition demolished, original building renovated into condos | 1923–1978 | Merged into Kent Schools 1959 | |
| South School | K–6 | 1115 Franklin Ave. 41°08′36″N 81°21′36″W | Partially razed in 1966; former gym converted to recreation center | 1880–1965 | Replaced by Holden Elementary School, 1965 | |
| South Schoolhouse | 1–6 | 1115 Franklin Ave; 41°8′36.14″N 81°21′34.92″W | Razed ca. 1895 | 1869–1880 | Built after completion of Union School in 1869. Replaced by South School in 1880. Site later used for gym addition to South School. | |
| Union School/Central School | 1–12; 1–8; K–6 | 200 N. Mantua St. 41°09′22″N 81°21′44″W | Razed in 1953 | 1869–1952 | Housed all grades, 1869–1922; Replaced by new Central School, 1953 | |

* = enrollment and faculty numbers as of the 2023–24 school year

== See also ==
- History of Kent, Ohio
