= Joe Finan =

American radio show host (1927–2006)

Joseph Albert Finan (July 6, 1927 – December 19, 2006) was an American radio show host.

Finan was born in 1927 in Butler, Pennsylvania. He served in the United States Navy 1944–45 and attended Carnegie Tech, now Carnegie Mellon University, in Pittsburgh, Pennsylvania. He began his broadcasting career as a weatherman in early 1950s at KYW-TV (now WKYC-TV) and radio personality on KYW radio in Cleveland, Ohio. While at KYW-TV, Finan worked alongside sports anchors Bob Neal and Jim Graner, and preceded weatherman Dick Goddard.

While a top rated disc jockey at KYW, Finan was implicated in the 1960 payola scandal that also named Alan Freed and others. It led to Finan's departure from KYW and ended the career of Freed, who first coined the name Rock and Roll.

Finan was hired by KTLN-Denver owner Richard K. Wheeler and named program director of the top forty station. By 1963 Joe Finan pioneered a talk radio format and renamed the station K-Talk with the call letters KTLK. Finan, as a colorful and controversial talk show host was credited with the expose' of the Denver police department that became a major scandal and led to many changes inside that department.

Finan also served a radio commentator for Denver Broncos football broadcasts during their first season in 1960, while at KTLN.

Joe Finan returned to work in Cleveland radio before becoming a top rated talk show host on WNIR radio in Akron, Ohio, in 1984, until his retirement on December 22, 2004. In February 2006, he came out of his retirement to work as a midday talk host for WARF until October of that year.

Finan died at 79 years of age on December 19, 2006, in Cleveland of complications from surgery.
