= Eddie Morgan (baseball) =

American baseball player (1914–1982)

- First baseman/Outfielder
- Born: November 19, 1914; Brady Lake, Ohio, U.S.
- Died: June 27, 1982 (aged 67); Lakewood, Ohio, U.S.
- Batted: Left Threw: Left

MLB debut
- April 14, 1936, for the St. Louis Cardinals

Last MLB appearance
- July 23, 1937, for the Brooklyn Dodgers

MLB statistics
- Batting average: .212
- Home runs: 1
- Runs batted in: 8
- Stats at Baseball Reference

Teams
- St. Louis Cardinals (1936); Brooklyn Dodgers (1937)

Edwin Willis Morgan (November 19, 1914 – June 27, 1982), nicknamed "Pepper", was an American backup right fielder/first baseman who played in Major League Baseball (MLB) between 1936 and 1937. Listed at 5 ft 10 in (1.78 m), 160 lb (73 kg), Morgan batted and threw left-handed.

Morgan graduated from Lakewood (Ohio) High School in 1931 and is in the LHS Athletic Hall of Fame. Morgan reached the majors in 1936 with the St. Louis Cardinals, spending one year for them before moving to the Brooklyn Dodgers in 1937. On April 14, 1936, Morgan hit a pinch-hit home run on the very first pitch he faced in his first career at bat (becoming the first pinch hitter ever to do so), but he saw little action after that, going 5 for 18 in eight appearances. At the end of the season, he was sent by St. Louis to Brooklyn in the same transaction that brought George Earnshaw to the Cardinals.

In parts of two seasons, Morgan hit .212 (14 for 66) with one home run and five runs batted in in 39 games, including eight runs scored and three doubles.

Morgan died in Lakewood, Ohio at the age of 67.

== See also ==
- List of Major League Baseball players with a home run in their first major league at bat
- Players who hit a pinch-hit home run in his first ever Major League at-bat
