= WJMP (Ohio) =

Radio station in Kent, Ohio (1965–2016)

- Kent, Ohio; United States
- Broadcast area: Akron metro area
- Frequency: 1520 kHz

Ownership
- Owner: Media-Com, Inc.

History
- First air date: March 11, 1965
- Last air date: July 31, 2016
- Former call signs: WKNT (1964–1989)
- Call sign meaning: "Jump"

Technical information
- Facility ID: 41075
- Class: D
- Power: 1,000 watts (days only)
- Transmitter coordinates: 41°9′37.2″N 81°18′15.4″W

WJMP was a commercial daytime-only radio station licensed to Kent, Ohio, United States, which operated on 1520 AM and served the Akron metro area. Owned by Media-Com, Inc. for much of its existence, the station broadcast from 1965 to 2016 as the AM adjunct to WNIR, which gradually assumed WKNT's more popular programs.

Subject to multiple format changes throughout the 1990s, 2000s and early 2010s, and garnering a Guinness World Record for playing Take Me Out to the Ball Game continuously as a stunt in 1994, WJMP ceased operations after the license was turned in to the Federal Communications Commission (FCC) for cancellation. WJMP's studios and transmitter were co-located with WNIR in Franklin Township and continue to house WNIR to the present day.

== History ==
The station formally signed on March 11, 1965, as WKNT, owned by the publisher of the Kent Ravenna Record-Courier newspaper; from the beginning, WKNT simulcast full-time with WKNT-FM (100.1), which had commenced operations three years earlier. Both stations were purchased by Media-Com, Inc. in July 1971. For its entire existence, the station operated at a transmitter site in Franklin Township with a maximum power output of 1,000 watts, using a six-tower, daytime-only directional antenna pattern. Due to WINW in Canton, Ohio, operating at the same frequency within a distance of 22 miles (35 km) from WKNT, both stations were engineered to have their signals avoid overlap with each other, pushing WKNT's signal into the Akron metro area and limited coverage in parts of Greater Cleveland.

Howie Chizek began his long career with WKNT and its FM successor on June 3, 1974, after previous stops at WBBW in Youngstown and at Ohio University's student-run radio station. For much of the 1970s, Chizek hosted two daily programs: Buy, Sell, Swap and Trade in the late mornings, followed by The Howie Chizek Show, a phone-in talk radio show in the midday hours. Stan Piatt also joined WKNT and WKNT-FM as morning host in 1978. Programming on the two stations was split on August 4, 1980, when WKNT-FM became WNIR, maintaining the hybrid contemporary music/talk format, while WKNT converted to country music with Steve Cherry in mornings and Jerry Lee Goddard in afternoons. Both Piatt and Chizek's programs were moved to WNIR; Chizek would remain at the station until his death on June 16, 2012.

After years of declining ratings, two of WKNT's three announcers were fired in early September 1988, but management claimed the station would continue with the country format. Despite those claims, WKNT changed format to oldies on November 11, 1988, as "Super Oldies 1520"; station vice president Bill Klaus claimed the switch would "fill a void" in the market with WHK (1420 AM)'s imminent format switch from oldies to financial news. The format switch was to have included a call sign change to WHTS, but that call belonged to a United States Coast Guard icebreaker. Klaus then offered the stations' audience a chance to vote between WOLZ (for "oldiez") and WJMP (for "jump") via mail-in ballot, WJMP won out and became the call sign on March 15, 1989.

Despite those changes, WJMP failed to show in the local Arbitron ratings books, and the station flipped to sports radio on March 1, 1993, utilizing programming from the American Sports Network. When the 1994 Major League Baseball season ended prematurely due to labor unrest on August 12, 1994, WJMP engaged in stunting by playing two different versions of Take Me Out to the Ball Game, in a continuous loop, from sunrise to sunset. The brainchild of Bill Klaus, WJMP's stunt merited national and international attention; Craig Hankin, who produced one of the two versions WJMP played, approved of the idea. Klaus also encouraged people to submit their own renditions of the song in order to help relieve the monotony. By the time the stunt ended at noon on October 19, 1994, the station had played the song a total of 57,161 times, meriting the station an entry in the Guinness Book of Sports Records. Despite the attention received, the stunt failed to register any ratings for WJMP once the sports radio format resumed, and the station switched to an audio relay of co-owned low-power television station W29AI (channel 29) in April 1995, this included W29AI's slate of locally produced talk shows and music videos.

WJMP changed to a standards format using the Music of Your Life service on June 11, 2001, this came in the wake of WRMR (850 AM) in Cleveland announcing plans to change formats to sports radio the following month. The adult standards format was dropped for Air America Radio programming in 2004, WJMP subsequently dropped Air America in July 2005 in favor of Fox Sports Radio programming after WTOU (1350 AM) switched from all-sports to progressive talk as WARF. On June 8, 2009, WJMP dropped its all-sports format and became a talk radio station, carrying an entirely syndicated slate of programming. At the end, WJMP was the Akron affiliate of Mancow in the Morning, The Laura Ingraham Show, The Savage Nation, and The Dennis Miller Show, and also carried CBS News Radio newscasts hourly.

WJMP permanently shut down operations on July 31, 2016. The next day, the station's license was returned to the FCC for cancellation. The towers were later dismantled, and FM sister WNIR continues to broadcast from studios at this location today.
