= All-America Bridge =

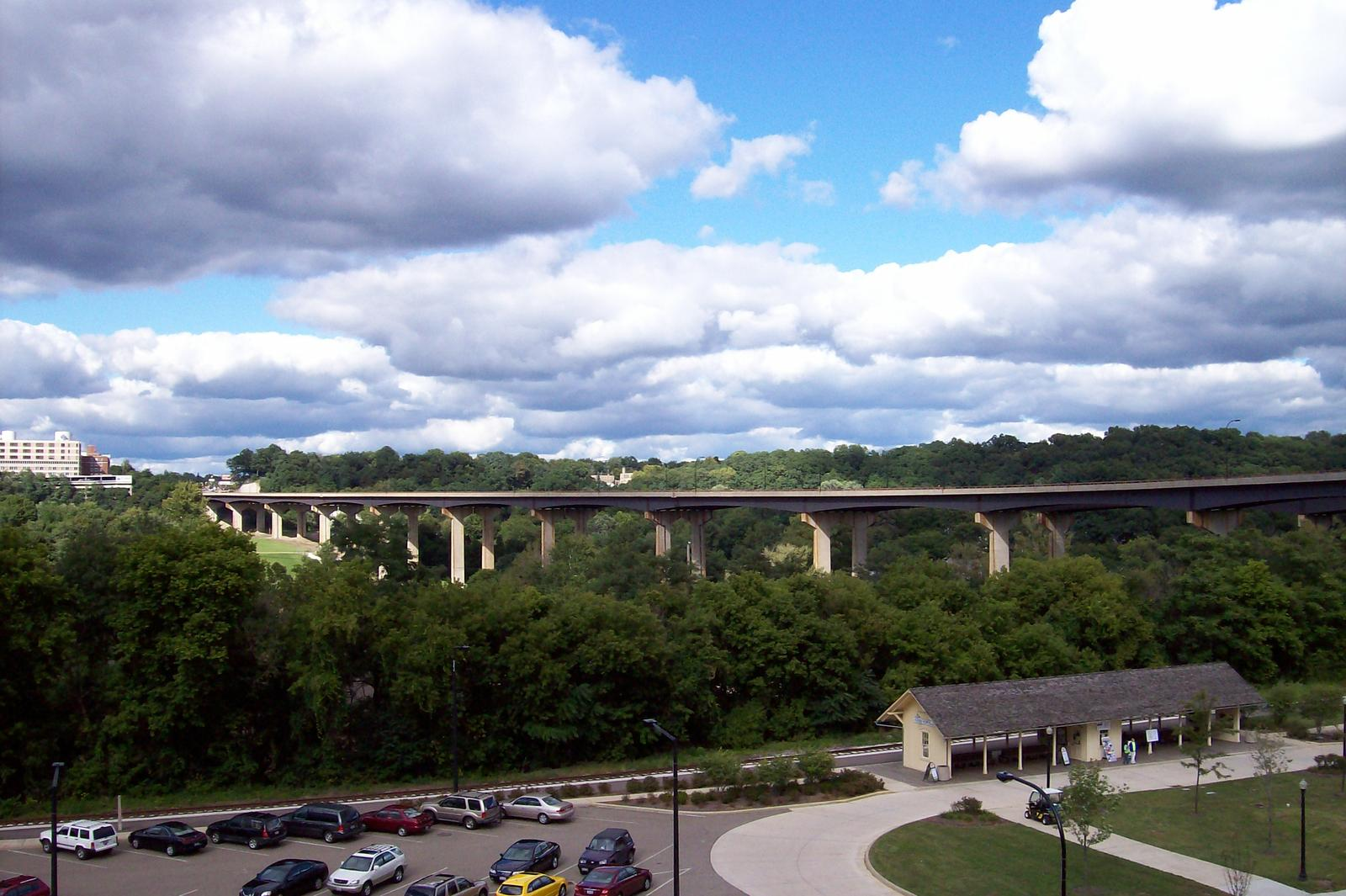
- Coordinates: 41.094637°N 81.512737°W
- Carries: 4 lanes of SR 261 and 1 sidewalk
- Crosses: Little Cuyahoga River
- Locale: Akron, Ohio
- Official name: All-America Bridge
- Other name(s): Y-Bridge
- Preceded by: North Hill Viaduct

Characteristics
- Height: 134 feet (41 m)

History
- Construction end: 1982

The All-America Bridge in Akron, Ohio is a viaduct carrying Ohio State Route 261 over the Little Cuyahoga River that splits into a one-way pair. The west span opened on October 31, 1981, and the east span opened in 1982. The bridge was named in recognition of Akron's past All-America City Awards and is also locally known as the Y-Bridge. The bridge is 134 feet tall in its highest location.

The bridge's predecessor, the 1922 North Hill Viaduct, was closed in 1977 after a long history of chunks of concrete falling from the bridge. The poem Under the Viaduct, 1932 from the Pulitzer Prize winning book of poems Thomas and Beulah by Rita Dove references the North Hill Viaduct.

Over its existence, the North Hill Viaduct had been the site of at least one suicide a year, though police records were not complete. At least two survived jumps in the 1930s. The replacement bridge has also been a magnet for suicides. From 1997 until December 3, 2009, 29 people committed suicide by jumping from the bridge. In 2009, it was announced that $1 million to $1.5 million would be spent to fence the bridge using federal economic stimulus funds. Fencing the bridge was controversial in Akron and the plan had previously failed to receive local support. Previous local attempts to fence the bridge failed in 1991, 1993, 2000 and 2006. The project, stopped for the winter of 2010–2011, was finally completed in late December 2011 at a total cost of around $8.7 million. In spite of the presence of the fence, another suicide occurred on June 28, 2012. A project to replace the fencing began in 2025.
