= Connecticut Land Company =

Land in northeast Ohio claimed by the colony (and later state) (1636–1800)

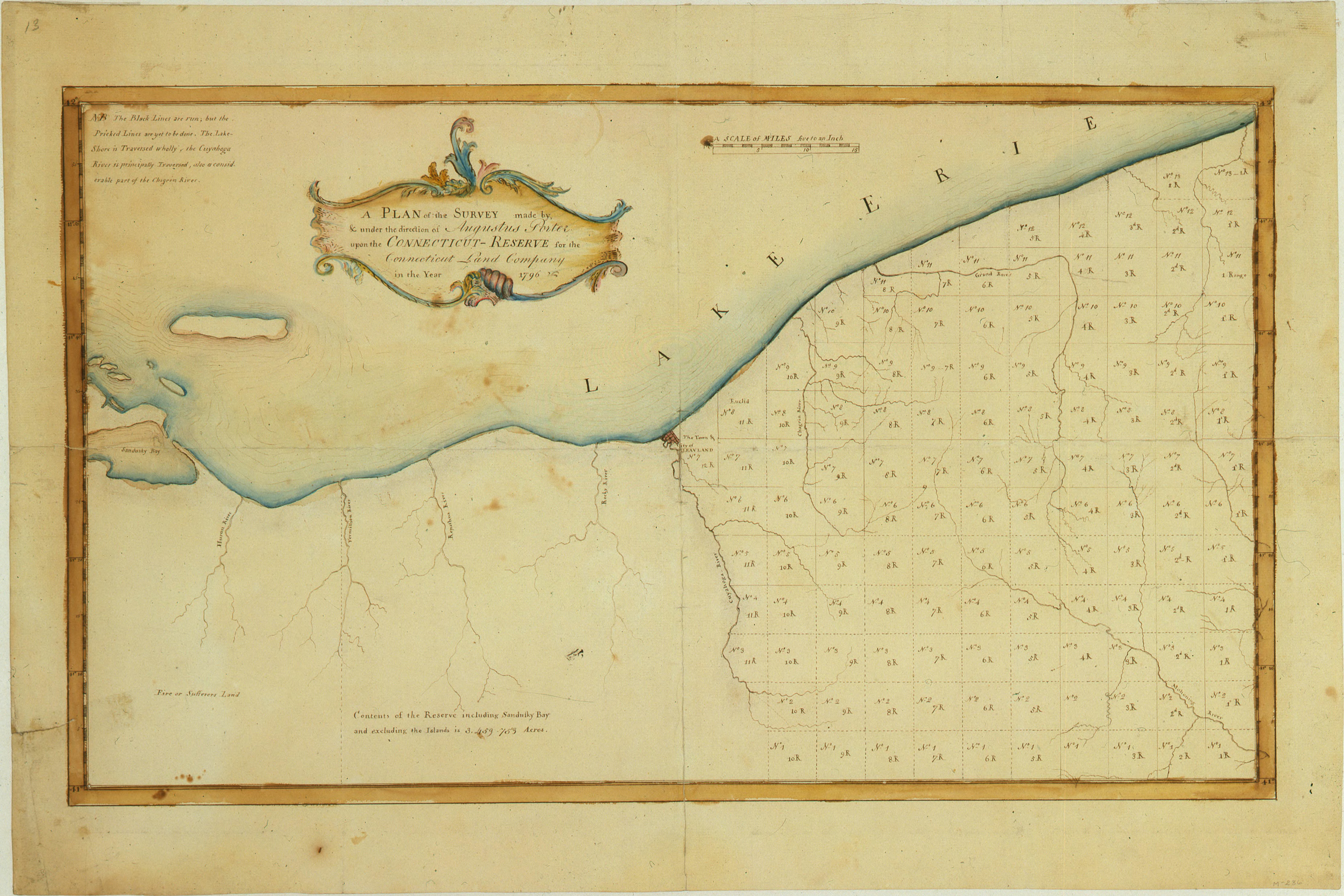
A Plan of the Survey made by & under the direction of Augustus Porter upon the Connecticut-Reserve for the Connecticut Land Company in the Year 1796. Showing the Western Reserve divided into sections and the town and city of Cleaveland (Cleveland). (Zoom)

The Connecticut Company or Connecticut Land Company (est. 1795) was a post-colonial land speculation company formed in the late eighteenth century to survey and encourage settlement in the eastern parts of the newly chartered Connecticut Western Reserve of the former "Ohio Country" and a prized-part of the Northwest Territory)—a post-American Revolutionary period region, that was part of the lands-claims settlement adjudicated by the new United States government regarding the contentious conflicting claims by various Eastern Seaboard states on lands west of the gaps of the Allegheny draining into the Allegheny, Monongahela, and Ohio Rivers. Under the arrangement, all the states gave up their land claims west of the Alleghenies to the Federal government save for parts parceled out to each claimant state. Western Pennsylvania was Pennsylvania's part, and the Connecticut Western Reserve was the part apportioned to Connecticut's claim. The specific Connecticut Western Reserve lands were the northeastern part of the greater Mississippi drainage basin lands just west of those defined as part of Pennsylvania's claims settlement (Western Pennsylvania).

The Western Reserve is located in Northeast Ohio with its hub being Cleveland. In 1795, the Connecticut Land Company bought three million acres (12,000 km^{2}) of the Western Reserve. Settlers used the guidelines of the Land Ordinance of 1785, which demanded the owners survey the land before settlement. In 1796, the company began surveys and sales on property east of Cuyahoga.

The original proprietors, 57 of the wealthiest and most prominent men in Connecticut, included Oliver Phelps, the largest subscriber and chief manager of the project. In 1796, one of the largest shareholders, Moses Cleaveland, planned a settlement on the banks of the Cuyahoga River with Seth Pease. This planned settlement would become the city of Cleveland.

The Deeds for the land were executed as follows:

No of Deeds	Names of Grantees	Integral parts of lands conveyed, divided into 1,200,000 shares
No 1	Robert Charles Johnson	$60,000 ($1,138,235 today)
No 2 & 3	Moses Cleaveland	$32,600 ($618,441 today)
No 4	William Judd	$16,250 ($308,272 today)
No 5	James Johnson	$30,000 ($569,118 today)
No 6	William Law	$10,500 ($199,191 today)
No 7	Daniel Holbrook	$8,750 ($165,993 today)
No 8	Pierpont Edwards	$60,000 ($1,138,235 today)
No 9	James Bull, Aaron Olmsted, John Wiles	$30,000 ($569,118 today)
No 10	Elisha Hyde, Uriah Tracy	$57,400 ($1,088,912 today)
No 11	Luther Loomis, Ebenezer King	$44,318 ($840,739 today)
No 12	Roger Newberry, Enoch Perkins, Jonathan Brace	$38,000 ($720,882 today)
No 13	Ephraim Root	$42,000 ($796,765 today)
No 14	Ephraim Kirby, Uriel Holmes Jr, Elijah Boardman	$60,000 ($1,138,235 today)
No 15	Oliver Phelps, Gideon Granger Jr	$80,000 ($1,517,647 today)
No 16	Oliver Phelps	$168,185 ($3,190,568 today)
No 17	John Caldwell, Peleg Sanford	$15,000 ($284,559 today)
No 18	Soloman Cowles	$10,000 ($189,706 today)
No 19	Soloman Griswold	$10,000 ($189,706 today)
No 20	Henry Champion 2d	$85,675 ($1,625,305 today)
No 21	Samuel P. Lord	$14,092 ($267,334 today)
No 22	Jazeb Stocking, Joshua Stow	$11,423 ($216,701 today)
No 23	Timothy Burr	$15,231 ($288,941 today)
No 24	Caleb Atwater	$22,846 ($433,402 today)
No 25	Titus Street	$22,846 ($433,402 today)
No 26	Elias Morgan, Daniel Lathrop Coit	$51,402 ($975,126 today)
No 27	Joseph Howland, Daniel Lathrop Coit	$30,461 ($577,863 today)
No 28	Asher Miller	$34,000 ($645,000 today)
No 29	Ephraim Starr	$17,415 ($330,373 today)
No 30	Joseph Williams	$15,231 ($288,941 today)
No 31	William Lyman, John Stoddard, David King	$24,730 ($469,143 today)
No 32	Nehemiah Hubbard Jr	$19,039 ($361,181 today)
No 33	Asahel Hathaway	$12,000 ($227,647 today)
No 34	William Hart	$30,462 ($577,882 today)
No 35	Samuel Mather Jr	$18,461 ($350,216 today)
No 36	Sylvanus Griswold	$1,683 ($31,927 today)

== Background ==
The Connecticut Land Company was set up by a group of private investors in 1795 with the aim of making a profit from land sales. Towards that end, the company bought a large portion of the eastern part of the Western Connecticut Reserves. That year, the company paid the state of Connecticut $1.2 million for three million acres of its Western Reserve lands. The $1.2 million raised by the state was used to fund public education. This allowed Connecticut to expand its public school system and improve its educational facilities. With regards to the land purchased by the company, it was divided into 1.2 million shares. On September 5, 1795, the company adopted articles of association, and each purchasing group was given a proportional share of the land commensurate with the amount of capital invested.

The main purpose of the Connecticut Land Company was the pursuit of profits through the sale of the lands to both land speculators and settlers. Land would usually be sold many times between speculators and investors before it would be sold to someone who would actually settle it. Due to weak land sales, the company was forced to lower prices and give away free land in order to encourage settlement. The problems that forced the company to lower prices would ultimately force the company into bankruptcy.

=== Key figures ===
The ownership of the company was made up of a syndicate of 35 purchasing groups representing a total of 58 individual investors. The leader of this group and the head of the Connecticut Land Company was Oliver Phelps. He was the single largest investor in the company and the head manager of this investment project. Another key figure in the company was Moses Cleaveland, one of the company’s first directors. He was in charge of conducting the first company survey of the Western Connecticut Reserves in 1796. Moses Cleaveland successfully negotiated a treaty with the Iroquois, who gave up all of their land claims east of the Cuyahoga River. He also founded a settlement named after him that would later become the city “Cleveland” due to a cartographic error.

== Problems ==
One of the problems that befell the Connecticut Land Company was company mismanagement. Sales efforts by the company were not centrally organized. The company did not even set up a marketing office in the Western Reserve to promote sales of land. Without an organized, concerted sales campaign by the company, their efforts to sell the land were mostly unsuccessful. In fact, only 1,000 people had settled in the region by 1800.

The other problem that beset the company and hurt land sales was political uncertainty surrounding the Connecticut Western Reserves. The political confusion concerned the right to govern the land and the legitimacy of the land titles. There were disputes between the Northwest Territory and the state of Connecticut over who had the right to govern the land purchased by the company. In addition, the company wanted Connecticut to guarantee the land titles that the company issues, but Connecticut refused. As a result of this uncertainty surrounding the legality of land titles and jurisdiction, many would-be settlers decided not to come.

What made settlement even less attractive was that the U.S. government did not recognize the Western Reserve as part of the Northwest Territory until 1800. In practice, this meant that the U.S. government did not provide settlers with legal or military protection. Then, on April 28, 1800, the Quieting Act was signed by President John Adams into law. The Quieting Act established Connecticut’s right to govern the land and guaranteed the legality of the land titles granted by the Connecticut Land Company. This was meant to encourage and speed up settlement and development of the region. Although this act resolved the problem of political uncertainty, continued poor company management meant that few settlers came. More significant development of the region would have to wait until after the War of 1812.

=== Bankruptcy ===
As a result of weak land sales stemming from company mismanagement and political uncertainty, the Connecticut Land Company failed to reach profitability. In 1809, a mere fourteen years after incorporation, the company faced bankruptcy and was dissolved. All of the remaining land was divided evenly amongst the company's investors. At that time, the company still owed a large amount of debt and was delinquent in its interest payments.
