= Ohio State Route 261 =

State highway in northeastern Ohio, US

State Route 261

Route information
- Maintained by ODOT
- Length: 25.85 mi (41.60 km)
- Existed: 1927–present

Major junctions
- West end: SR 94 in Wadsworth
- I-76 / US 224 in Wadsworth; SR 21 near Norton; I-77 in Akron; SR 18 / SR 162 in Akron; SR 8 / SR 59 in Akron; SR 91 in Tallmadge; SR 43 in Kent
- East end: SR 59 near Kent

Location
- Country: United States
- State: Ohio
- Counties: Medina, Summit, Portage

Highway system
- Ohio State Highway System; Interstate; US; State; Scenic
← SR 260	→ SR 262

State Route 261 (SR 261) is an east–west state highway located in northeastern Ohio that passes through Medina, Summit, and Portage counties. At a length of 26 miles (42 km), SR 261 runs from a signalized intersection with SR 94 in Wadsworth to a signalized T-intersection with SR 59 in Franklin Township just east of Kent.

State Route 261's routing is more complicated than other state highways, frequently changing streets and direction. It runs through downtown Akron as two sets of one-way surface streets. It has a divided highway section from the outskirts of southern Kent to just east of SR 43. This divided section was originally planned to be limited access and tie in with another highway, SR 435, but this plan was never implemented.

== History ==
SR 261 was commissioned in 1927 between SR 18, in Tallmadge, and Kent. In 1930 the highway was extended southwest to SR 8 in Akron. The route was extended west to Wadsworth, in 1937. The southeast section of the Kent bypass, between SR 43 and SR 59 opened between 1969 and 1971, with SR 261 be rerouted onto it then. The bypass of Kent west of SR 43 was completed in 1972, with SR 261 being rerouted onto that section then. In 1983 the highway was rerouted towards the northwest in the City of Akron.

== Major intersections ==
County	Location	mi	km	Destinations	Notes
Medina	Wadsworth	0.00	0.00	SR 94 (High Street)	
Medina	Wadsworth	2.02	3.25	I-76 / US 224 – Akron, Lodi	Exit 11 (I-76)
Summit	Norton	4.64	7.47	SR 21 – Massillion, Cleveland	Interchange
Summit	Akron	8.46– 8.65	13.62– 13.92	I-77 / Frederick Boulevard – Canton, Cleveland	Exit 130 (I-77)
Summit	Akron	9.97	16.05	SR 93 south (East Avenue)	Northern terminus of SR 93
Summit	Akron	10.61	17.08	SR 59 to Rhodes Avenue / Dart Avenue / I-76 / I-77	Interchange
Summit	Akron	12.36	19.89	SR 18 west / SR 162 (Market Street)	SR 261 as a one-way pair; eastern terminus of SR 162
Summit	Akron	12.51	20.13	SR 59 (M.L. King Boulevard)	SR 261 as a one-way pair
Summit	Akron	14.18	22.82	SR 8 / SR 59 / Gorge Boulevard	Exit 3 (SR 8)
Summit	Tallmadge	18.40	29.61	SR 91 – Akron, Mogadore, Hudson, Cuyahoga Falls	Tallmadge Circle
Portage	Kent	22.81	36.71	SR 43 (Water Street) – Kent, Hartville	
Portage	Franklin Township	25.85	41.60	SR 59 – Kent, Ravenna	
1.000 mi = 1.609 km; 1.000 km = 0.621 mi
