= Aaron Olmsted =

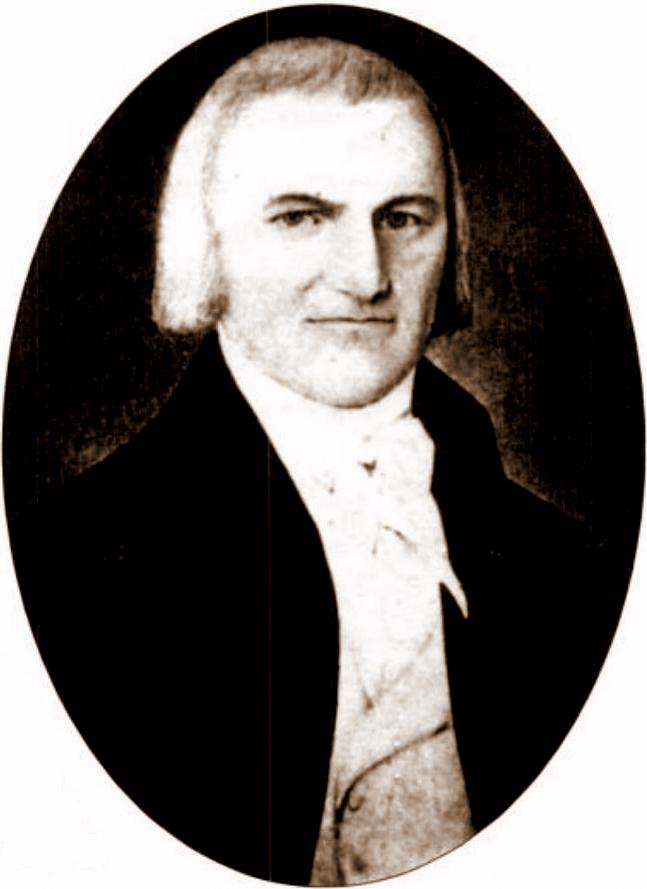
Aaron Olmsted

Captain Aaron Olmsted (May 19, 1753 – September 9, 1806), erroneously spelled Olmstead, was a wealthy sea captain in the China trade out of New England, and one of 49 investors who formed the Connecticut Land Company in 1795 to purchase a major part of the Western Reserve from the U.S. state of Connecticut. He became the owner of thousands of acres from his $30,000 share of the $1,200,000 total land deal. The land encompassed the areas of Northeast Ohio now known as North Olmsted, Olmsted Falls, and Olmsted Township (originally known as Lenox) in what is now Cuyahoga County, as well as Franklin Township, named after his son Aaron Franklin Olmsted, and most of the city of Kent in what is now Portage County. Olmsted traveled west on horseback to visit the land in 1795, but never settled there.

A native of East Hartford, Connecticut, he was born 19 May 1753 as the eighth child of General Jonathan and Hanna (Meakins) Olmsted. Olmsted served as Adjutant general of the 4th Connecticut Regiment during the American Revolutionary War. He married Mary Langrel Bigelow on 10 December 1778 and had fourteen children, of which only five lived to adulthood. He died 9 September 1806 in East Hartford.
