= WNIR (FM) =

Radio station in Kent, Ohio

- Kent, Ohio; United States
- Broadcast area: Akron metro area
- Frequency: 100.1 MHz
- Branding: WNIR 100 FM

Programming
- Format: Talk radio
- Affiliations: ABC News Radio; Salem Radio Network; Westwood One

Ownership
- Owner: Media-Com, Inc.

History
- First air date: February 19, 1962
- Former call signs: WKNT-FM (1962–79)
- Call sign meaning: former "Winner 100" slogan

Technical information
- Licensing authority: FCC
- Facility ID: 41077
- Class: A
- ERP: 4,200 watts
- HAAT: 120 meters (390 ft)
- Transmitter coordinates: 41°6′28.2″N 81°21′18.4″W

Links
- Public license information: Public file; LMS
- Webcast: Listen live
- Website: wnir.com

WNIR (100.1 FM) is a commercial radio station licensed to Kent, Ohio, carrying a talk format known as "WNIR 100 FM". Owned by Media-Com, Inc., the station serves the Akron metro area as the local affiliate for ABC News Radio, syndicated personalities Rich Valdes and Mike Gallagher, and is the radio home of Bob Golic. WNIR's studios are located in Franklin Township, while the station transmitter resides in Brimfield. In addition to a standard analog transmission, WNIR is available online.

== History ==
The station signed on the air as WKNT-FM on February 19, 1962. Owned by the publisher of the Kent Ravenna Record-Courier newspaper, WKNT-FM and WKNT (1520 AM), the latter having commenced operations in 1965, primarily served the Portage County area with an adult contemporary format.

The stations were purchased in 1972 by Media-Com, Inc., a family-owned business headed by Richard Klaus. Klaus lured a young Howie Chizek from Youngstown to host a five-hour midday talk show, changing the station's history forever. The call sign for the FM station was changed to WNIR on April 19, 1979, and it was branded Winner 100. Eventually, the AC music was dropped, and the station became all talk, adding Joe Finan in late afternoons in 1985 to replace a "GameRadio" afternoon drive show, hosted by Bob Roberts and Joey Harper.

A cult favorite of the late 1980s and early 1990s was WNIR's "Dial A Date" (later renamed "The Dating Show"), hosted nightly by Jim Albright. Albright would pick one "contestant" from the phone lines and talk to that person about their life for about 10 minutes. At the end of the conversation, Albright would ask late-night listeners of the opposite sex if they would like to meet the contestant. He would then answer, often live on the air, potential "date" calls. Jim Albright would sort through the prank calls and pick three potential dates for the contestant. After some talking back and forth, the contestant would pick a date and exchange phone numbers off the air.

Howie Chizek (1947–2012) was Northeast Ohio's "Dean of talk radio" with multiple #1 rankings for over 38 years. Chizek died June 17, 2012, in Florida at the start of his annual trip to Disney World with underprivileged children. Joe Finan retired in December 2004 and was replaced by former Cleveland Browns player Bob Golic. WNIR remains unique in this day and age dominated by syndicated talk radio with live local programming from morning to night.

WNIR began internet audio streaming of its programming on January 2, 2009, and launched an improved website. On January 14, 2011, a WNIR app for iPhones became available. WNIR announced that an app for Android and Blackberry would follow.

MediaCom was founded by Richard "Dick" Klaus, who died on January 28, 2006, at the age of 86. Sons Robert and William continue today with the family ownership and management of the station.

Inside Radio noted that, during Summer 2005, WNIR was the highest rated FM talk station in America in terms of market rank and market share.

== Programming ==
=== Past ===
When WNIR became a talk station in the 1970s, it was unusual in that it was an FM talk station, whereas most talk stations were AM. Now, talk stations on FM are fairly common, many of them aimed at younger audiences. However, WNIR has always operated as more of a traditional, AM-style talk radio station. WNIR does not broadcast in stereo.

It was announced on June 3, 2011, that longtime Morning Show newsman Jim Midock was retiring from WNIR for health reasons, but remained with the station hosting the Midock Minute featuring interviews with various local WNIR sponsors for a time after that.

Longtime WNIR voice Tom Erickson was heard in the evenings until his death in 2012. Longtime NE Ohio radio personality and newspaper writer Jim Isabella was then brought in to fill the timeslot. After Isabella left the station in early 2022, longtime weekend and fill-in host Bill Hall briefly became evening host until he was replaced by former Cleveland TV weatherman Carey Coleman.

Longtime midday host Howie Chizek died in June 2012. After a couple of months of guest hosts filling the midday slot, on August 10, 2012, longtime Chizek show caller John "Couch Burner" Denning became the new full-time midday host.

Former morning host Stan Piatt, who retired from WNIR in 2013 died February 11, 2020, at 68 from lung cancer. Stan's career at the station spanned 35 years. He relocated to Pittsburgh after retiring. Piatt had returned to the area in 2016 and worked part time at AM radio station WHLO.

Long-time fill-in host Bob Earley hosted a live, local weekend show until he resigned in February 2014. The weekend evening slot was filled by Breaking Good, hosted by Brimfield, Ohio, police chief David Oliver, debuting on August 2, 2014. Breaking Good was placed on hiatus on January 14, 2015, after Oliver was suspended from the Brimfield Police Department amid allegations of gender discrimination. Oliver resigned as police chief on January 16 and WNIR cancelled the show on January 22.

=== Current ===
WNIR's weekday schedule consists primarily of locally hosted programming. The station airs The Morning Buzz with Phil Ferguson, Joyce Johnson, Chris Casale, John Lockwood andTom Cullison during morning drive time, John "Couch Burner" Denning middays, former Cleveland Browns Pro Bowl nose tackle Bob Golic in afternoon drive time, and former Youngstown sportscaster Ron Potesta evenings. The station's weekday personalities also host Saturday programs.

Evening and overnight programming consists of nationally syndicated shows hosted by Rich Valdes (from Westwood One) and Mike Gallagher (from Salem Radio Network) respectively, and all day WNIR airs ABC News Radio hourly updates.
