= Brady Lake (Ohio) =

Natural lake in Portage County, Ohio, United States

- Location within Ohio Location within the United States
- Location: Portage County, Ohio
- Coordinates: 41°09′53″N 81°18′58″W
- Type: kettle lake
- Basin countries: United States
- Surface area: 73.53 acres (29.76 ha)
- Surface elevation: 1,053 ft (321 m)
- Settlements: Brady Lake

Brady Lake is a natural lake in Portage County, Ohio, United States. It is a kettle lake and has no natural tributaries or outlets. The lake is located Franklin Township, approximately one mile (1.6 km) east of the Kent city limits with the unincorporated area of Brady Lake surrounding the lake. From 1927 to 2017, the areas along the eastern and southern shores were part of the village of Brady Lake.

== Name ==
Brady Lake gets its name from Captain Samuel Brady who hid in the lake in 1780 while fleeing a band of local American Indians. Initially, the lake was referred to as "Brady's Lake" before eventually being shortened to the modern Brady Lake.

== Historical uses ==
Brady Lake was used during the operation of the Pennsylvania and Ohio Canal as a source of water along with nearby Pippen Lake, as the canal passed just to the south of the lake just east of present-day Kent, Ohio. From 1900 to 1924, Brady Lake was used to harvest ice in for local ice boxes, with some ice being shipped as far as Cleveland and Youngstown, Ohio.
