= Sugar Bush Knolls, Ohio =

- Village
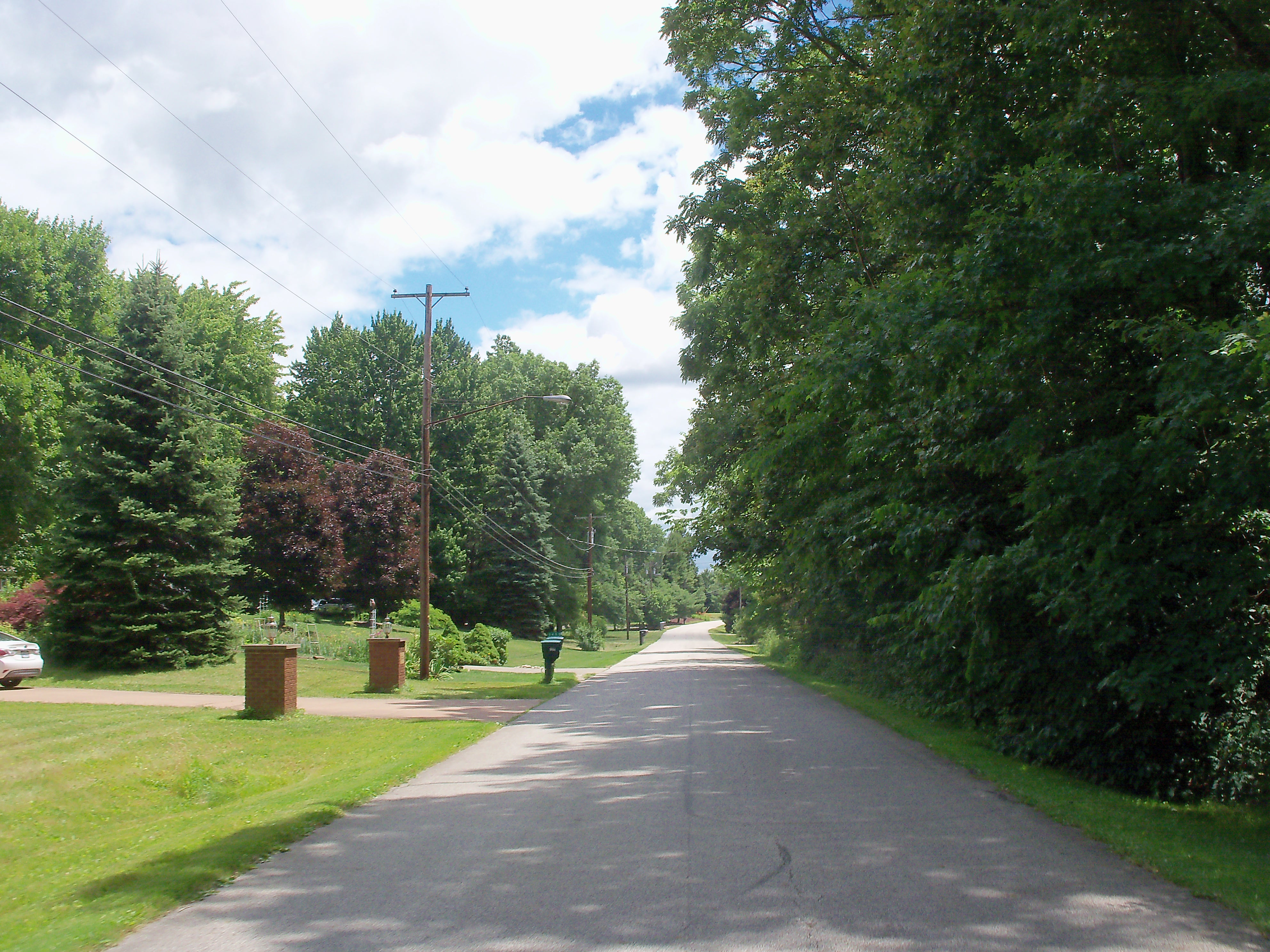
- Lake Martin Drive, near the northern boundary of the village
- Interactive map of Sugar Bush Knolls, Ohio
- Location within Ohio Location within the United States
- Coordinates: 41°12′14″N 81°20′50″W
- Country: United States
- State: Ohio
- County: Portage
- Founded: 1964

Area
  - Total: 0.25 sq mi (0.65 km^{2})
  - Land: 0.24 sq mi (0.61 km^{2})
  - Water: 0.015 sq mi (0.04 km^{2})
- Elevation: 1,063 ft (324 m)

Population (2020)
  - Total: 217
  - Density: 925.5/sq mi (357.33/km^{2})
- Time zone: UTC-5 (Eastern (EST))
  - Summer (DST): UTC-4 (EDT)
- ZIP code: 44240
- Area codes: 330, 234
- FIPS code: 39-75196
- GNIS feature ID: 1086842
- Website: sugarbushknollsohio.org

Sugar Bush Knolls is a village in western Portage County, Ohio, United States. The population was 217 at the 2020 census. It was formed from portions of Streetsboro and Franklin townships in 1964.

== History ==
During the Depression, the Davey Tree Company operated a nursery and experimental tree farm on the site of what is now called the Village of Sugar Bush Knolls. The village was named for the sugar maple trees which originally stood near Lake Martin.

The Davey Company owned the land where the village is now located and kept horses in the barn on Ferguson Road where the Framptons would later live. The company owned the small white house on the corner of Ferguson and Lake Martin Drive. During the early 1930s, the company offered to let Charles Miller, one of its employees, and his family move into that house, which had no electricity, telephone, or well.

In 1942, the Millers' son, "Tuck", and family moved in with the senior Millers; at this time, the street was just a gravel road and did not extend out to Route 43.

Martin Davey, the president of Davey Tree, arranged to have Lake Martin (named for him), Lake Roger and Lake Quincy dug out of the swampland. Lake Roger was named for William Roger Williams and Lake Quincy for David Quincy Grove, both officers of the Davey Tree Company. Harold Moore was the caretaker of the area used by Davey employees for recreation. A picnic shelter, rowboats, tree swings, and picnic tables were used for the company's picnics.

The death of Martin Davey in 1946 ended plans for building the company headquarters on the site. In the 1950s the land was divided into building lots and sold. Local businessman Cyril Porthouse purchased a number of lots and built one of the first homes. He loaned the Village money to have sewers installed so that the village could be developed. Some of the early homes were built by McElhones, Bushes, Longs, Kaisers, and Geldhofs.

== Geography ==
According to the United States Census Bureau, the village has a total area of 0.23 square miles (0.60 km^{2}), of which 0.21 square miles (0.54 km^{2}) is land and 0.02 square miles (0.05 km^{2}) is water.

== Demographics ==
Historical population
Census	Pop.	Note	%±
1970	119		—
1980	201		68.9%
1990	211		5.0%
2000	227		7.6%
2010	177		−22.0%
2020	217		22.6%
U.S. Decennial Census

=== 2010 census ===
As of the census of 2010, there were 177 people, 69 households, and 52 families residing in the village. The population density was 842.9 inhabitants per square mile (325.4/km^{2}). There were 74 housing units at an average density of 352.4 per square mile (136.1/km^{2}). The racial makeup of the village was 91.5% White, 1.1% African American, 0.6% Native American, 2.3% Asian, 1.1% from other races, and 3.4% from two or more races. Hispanic or Latino of any race were 2.3% of the population.

There were 69 households, of which 26.1% had children under the age of 18 living with them, 69.6% were married couples living together, 4.3% had a female householder with no husband present, 1.4% had a male householder with no wife present, and 24.6% were non-families. 15.9% of all households were made up of individuals, and 4.3% had someone living alone who was 65 years of age or older. The average household size was 2.57 and the average family size was 2.88.

The median age in the village was 51.6 years. 17.5% of residents were under the age of 18; 5.1% were between the ages of 18 and 24; 18.6% were from 25 to 44; 39.1% were from 45 to 64; and 19.8% were 65 years of age or older. The gender makeup of the village was 48.0% male and 52.0% female.

=== 2000 census ===
As of the census of 2000, there were 227 people, 79 households, and 69 families residing in the village. The population density was 995.6 inhabitants per square mile (384.4/km^{2}). There were 79 housing units at an average density of 346.5 per square mile (133.8/km^{2}). The racial makeup of the village was 98.68% White, 0.44% Asian, 0.44% from other races, and 0.44% from two or more races. Hispanic or Latino of any race were 1.32% of the population.

There were 79 households, out of which 35.4% had children under the age of 18 living with them, 82.3% were married couples living together, 3.8% had a female householder with no husband present, and 11.4% were non-families. 10.1% of all households were made up of individuals, and 7.6% had someone living alone who was 65 years of age or older. The average household size was 2.87 and the average family size was 3.06.

In the village, the population was spread out, with 25.1% under the age of 18, 5.3% from 18 to 24, 17.2% from 25 to 44, 39.2% from 45 to 64, and 13.2% who were 65 years of age or older. The median age was 46 years. For every 100 females there were 102.7 males. For every 100 females age 18 and over, there were 102.4 males.

The median income for a household in the village was $129,555, and the median income for a family was $137,982. Males had a median income of $68,125 versus $48,854 for females. The per capita income for the village was $47,304. None of the families and 2.8% of the population were living below the poverty line.
