= Ohio State Route 59 =

State highway in Ohio, US

State Route 59
- SR 59 highlighted in red

Route information
- Maintained by ODOT
- Length: 22.99 mi (37.00 km)
- Existed: 1969–present

Major junctions
- West end: I-76 / I-77 in Akron
- SR 8 from Akron to Cuyahoga Falls
- East end: SR 5 near Ravenna

Location
- Country: United States
- State: Ohio
- Counties: Summit, Portage

Highway system
- Ohio State Highway System; Interstate; US; State; Scenic
← SR 58	→ SR 60

State Route 59 (SR 59) is an east–west state highway in the U.S. state of Ohio, serving the Akron metropolitan area. The western terminus of State Route 59 is in downtown Akron at a partial interchange with the Interstate 76/Interstate 77 concurrency, and the eastern terminus is at State Route 5, 0.5 miles (0.80 km) east of Ravenna. The route is approximately 23 miles (37 km) long and was certified in 1969 over what had previously been part of SR 5. It serves as a major or as the primary east–west roadway for the cities of Cuyahoga Falls, Kent, Ravenna, and Stow, the village of Silver Lake, and Franklin and Ravenna Townships.

== Route description ==
State Route 59 traverses parts of Summit and Portage Counties, with a western terminus at a partial interchange with Interstates 76 and 77 in Akron and an eastern terminus at State Route 5 in Ravenna Township. The entire length of the 22.99-mile (37.00 km) road is included within the National Highway System, a network of routes deemed most important for the economy, mobility and defense of the nation.

The western terminus of SR 59 is the Akron Innerbelt, a limited access highway originally meant to bypass downtown. The interchange with Interstates 76 and 77 is only partial, with direct access to SR 59 from eastbound 76/southbound 77 and direct access to westbound 76/northbound 77 from SR 59. Traffic going the opposite directions must use surface streets to access the other highway. Westbound SR 59 traffic wishing to access east 76 and south 77 must exit the freeway and follow Rhodes Avenue, while west 76 and north 77 traffic wishing to access eastbound SR 59 must use the Dart Avenue exit, accessing SR 59 via Russell Avenue, Rhodes Avenue, and Dart Avenue.

At Opportunity Parkway, SR 59 has its first of four junctions with State Route 261. After crossing Cedar Avenue and Exchange Street, SR 59 exits the freeway section and is known as Martin Luther King Boulevard. It passes under State Route 18 (Market Street) as it veers to the east and becomes a regular surface street with signalized intersections. The second of four junctions with SR 261 is at the All-America Bridge, which connects North High Street (261 West) and North Broadway Streets (261 East). After crossing Prospect Street, the roadway is known as Perkins Street. At State Route 8, eastbound SR 59 turns north and enters the freeway with SR 8 at Fountain Street, while westbound 59 exits the freeway at Goodkirk Street.

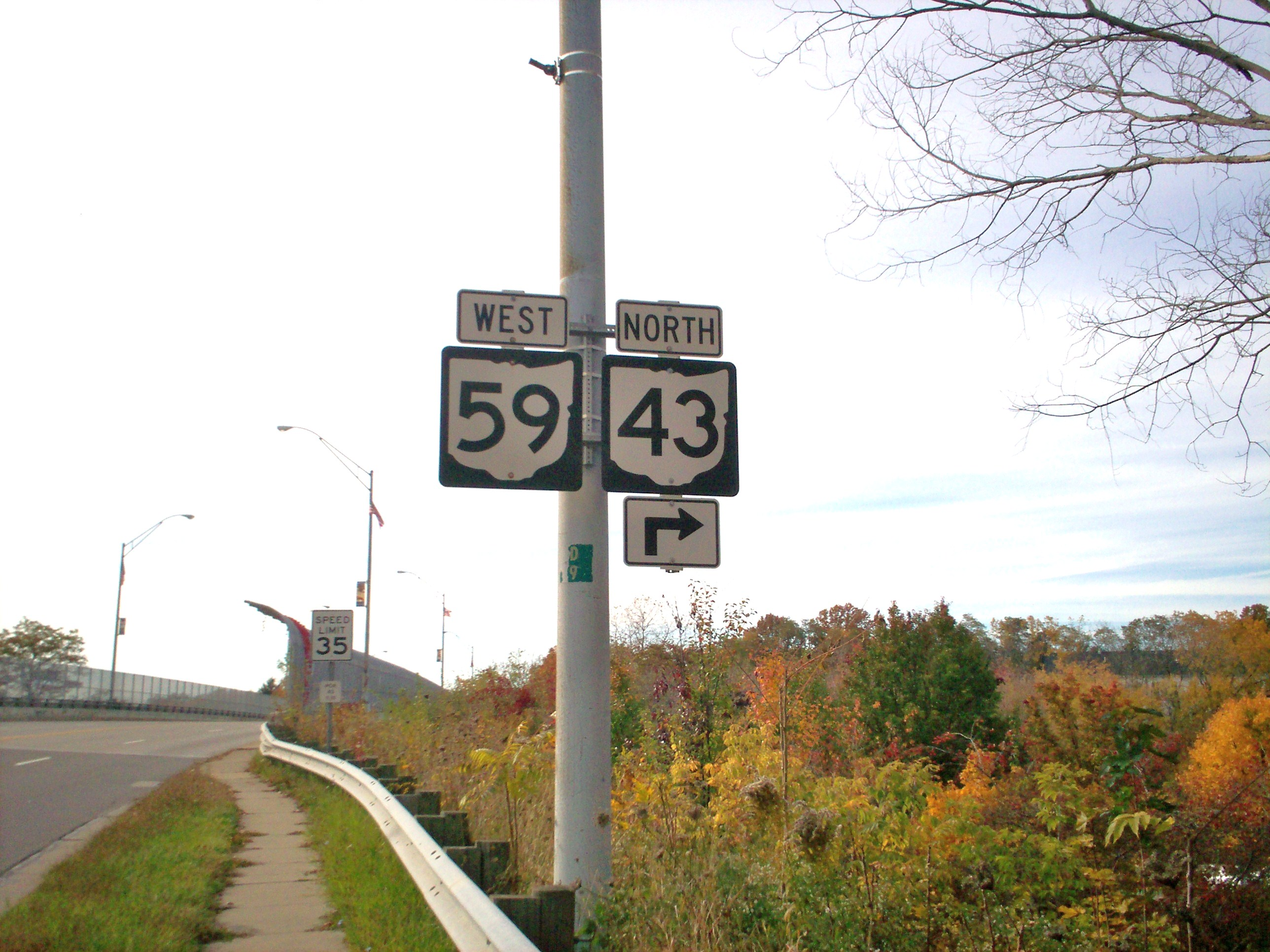

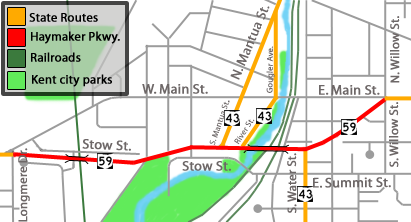
Haymaker Parkway in Kent

State Routes 8 and 59 are cosigned for approximately five miles (8.0 km), running north–south between exit 1D (Perkins Street) and exit 6 (Front Street). The third junction with SR 261 is at exit 3A (Tallmadge Avenue) and SR 59 enters the city of Cuyahoga Falls at exit 3B (Cuyahoga Falls Avenue/Howe Avenue). After passing downtown Cuyahoga Falls, SR 59 exits the freeway onto Front Street in Cuyahoga Falls and veers again to the east as a four-lane road. After passing into the village of Silver Lake, the roadway is known as Kent Road. As Kent Road, SR 59 continues into Stow, where it has a junction with State Route 91 (Darrow Road).

Entering Portage County and Kent, SR 59 is part of West Main Street. At the intersection with Longmere Drive, SR 59 continues east onto Haymaker Parkway, a five-lane roadway that carries it over all three railroad lines in Kent and Cuyahoga River and bypasses downtown Kent to the south and east. Just west of the bridge over Cuyahoga River, southbound State Route 43 joins from South Mantua Street, while northbound 43 leaves at River Street. State Routes 43 and 59 are cosigned for a short distance, crossing the Cuyahoga River and two railroad lines. Just east of the bridge, at South Water Street, southbound 43 exits the concurrency, while northbound 43 enters. At Willow Street, SR 59 joins East Main Street and passes the campus of Kent State University. After leaving the Kent city limits into Franklin Township, the roadway is known as Kent–Ravenna Road. In Franklin Township, SR 59 meets the eastern terminus of SR 261, the fourth junction with 261. The route continues east into Ravenna Township and becomes West Main Street as it enters Ravenna. Continuing east into downtown Ravenna, the roadway becomes East Main Street after crossing Chestnut Street. Just east of the downtown area Freedom Street, SR 59 meets the southern terminus of State Route 88 and passes through the East Main Street Historic District. Just past the eastern city limits, in an area known as Cotton Corners, the roadway becomes Ravenna–Warren Road and intersects with State Routes 44 and 14 (Cleveland–East Liverpool Road). Just under 1 mile (1.6 km) east is the eastern terminus of SR 59 at a junction with State Route 5. Ravenna–Warren Road continues east as SR 5.

Outside of the freeway sections of the Martin Luther King Freeway and the portion cosigned with SR 8, the roadway is four or five lanes through Cuyahoga Falls, Silver Lake, Stow, and Kent. The road narrows to two or three lanes in between a railroad underpass just east of SR 261 in Franklin Township and Menough Road in Ravenna Township. It widens back to four lanes at Menough Road just west of the Ravenna city limits, and is four and five lanes as it enters Ravenna up to Sycamore Street, where it narrows to three lanes as it passes through downtown Ravenna. After passing through downtown Ravenna, the road widens back to five lanes at Linden Street east through the junction with State Routes 14 and 44. East of the 14/44 junction, it narrows back to two or three lanes for remaining portion to the eastern terminus at SR 5, which continues east as a two-lane road.

== History ==
At the 1923 Ohio state highway renumbering, State Route 59 was assigned to the roadway between Norwalk and Elyria. By 1929, the western terminus was moved to Milan before being extended further west to Bellvue by 1930. The entire roadway was made part of State Route 113 by 1939.

The current State Route 59 was certified in 1969 with the eastern terminus at its current location and the western terminus at the intersection of North Main Street and Cuyahoga Falls Avenue in Akron, where it met SR 8. The general route was originally designated as part of State Route 36 from 1923 to 1932 and as State Route 5 from 1932 to 1969. The creation of SR 59 was part of a reroute of State Route 5 to a new southeastern bypass of Ravenna to end at Interstate 76 in Rootstown. State Route 585 was certified the same year for the portion of SR 5 between State Route 21 and Wooster. In its 1969 route, the western terminus of SR 59 was the intersection of East Cuyahoga Falls Avenue and North Main Street in the North Hill neighborhood of Akron, following the previous alignment of SR 5. SR 59 followed Cuyahoga Falls Avenue east, intersecting with the original end of the SR 8 expressway, then known as the SR 8 Bypass or 8-B. Just after the intersection with the expressway, SR 59 turned northward onto Front Street and followed Front Street and Second Avenue through Cuyahoga Falls.

During the 1970s, multiple changes were made to the alignment of SR 59 as various projects were completed. The western end of SR 59 was rerouted onto the SR 8 Expressway and Akron Innerbelt as the Innerbelt, later named the Martin Luther King Freeway, was completed in phases between 1972 and 1986. The portion of SR 59 on Perkins Avenue was originally intended to be temporary until the northern leg of the Innerbelt was completed, and was officially designated at State Route 59T until August 2007. The section through Kent was rerouted onto the new Haymaker Parkway in 1975 after previously following West and East Main Streets through the city.

=== The Innerbelt ===
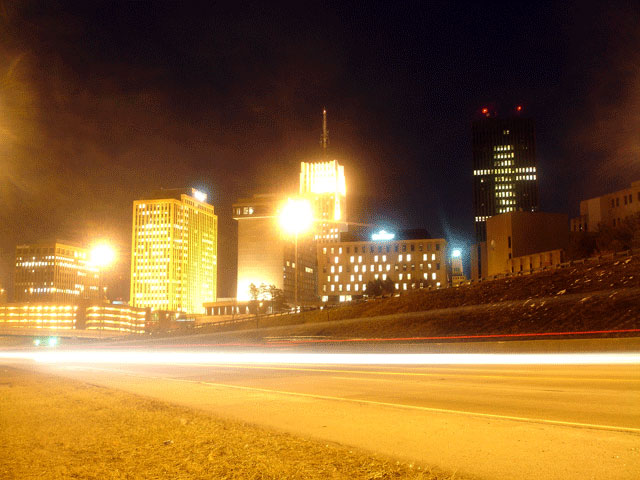
The Innerbelt looking northeast

Designed after almost all other highway projects in Akron were completed, the Innerbelt, later named the Martin Luther King Freeway, was envisioned as a 21.5-mile (34.6 km) stretch; however the only portion that was ever built was a 2.24-mile (3.60 km) stretch near downtown Akron. The freeway is designed with six lanes and right-of-way for eight. It includes two collector streets along the entire corridor which, combined, are at some points as wide as the freeway itself. Planning and property acquisition began as early as 1968 and displaced thousands of residents, many of them minority and low-income residents, and over 100 businesses. The first portion of the freeway, between Exchange Street and Market Street, opened in 1972, while the next section, between Exchange Street and Howard Street, opened in 1978, and the interchange with I-76/I-77 in 1986.

In 1999 Akron mayor Don Plusquellic suggested ripping up the northern end of the freeway, making it a city street, and developing the surrounding land. The idea was fostered by a trip to Milwaukee, in which Plusquellic saw the much-maligned Park East Freeway spur in that city's downtown removed in order to reuse the land. A similar plan presented in late 2014 proposed removal of the freeway north of the West Exchange Street overpass with an upgrade of the adjacent frontage roads to compensate. Construction relating to this plan started in early 2017. The city of Akron acquired the land with the abandoned roadways in 2021. The Akron Innerbelt Master Plan was released on March 23, 2026.

In July 2001, the city announced that the Innerbelt would be closed for several days while a commercial was being shot. The highway was also surveyed by the producers of the movie The Matrix Reloaded as a possible shooting spot of the highway scene. The idea was eventually scrapped, because in the event that the scene would have to be reshot, the time to reset all the cars in their start position would take too long.

== Major intersections ==
Note that the Akron Innerbelt does not have exit numbers on destination signage.

County	Location	mi	km	Exit	Destinations	Notes
Summit	Akron	0.00	0.00		I-76 west / I-77 north – Barberton, Cleveland	Exit 21C (I-76/I-77); access to I-76 west/I-77 north and from I-76 east/I-77 south only
Summit	Akron	1.07	1.72	—	SR 261 (Vernon Odom Boulevard / Opportunity Parkway) to I-76 east / I-77 south	Westbound exit and eastbound entrance
Summit	Akron	1.68– 1.78	2.70– 2.86	—	Cedar Street / Exchange Street	
Summit	Akron			Northern end of freeway		
Summit	Akron				SR 18 / SR 162	
Summit	Akron	2.77	4.46		SR 261 west (North High Street)	
Summit	Akron	2.83	4.55		SR 261 east (North Broadway Street)	
Summit	Akron	3.53	5.68		SR 8 south	Western (southern) end of SR 8 concurrency; exit 1D on SR 8 southbound
Summit	Akron			Southern end of freeway		
Summit	Akron	4.41	7.10	2	Glenwood Avenue	Eastbound exit / westbound entrance only
Summit	Akron	4.73	7.61	3A	SR 261 (Tallmadge Avenue)	Exit 3 on SR 8 southbound
Summit	Akron	5.64	9.08	3B	Cuyahoga Falls Avenue	Eastbound exit / westbound entrance only
Summit	Cuyahoga Falls	6.09	9.80	4	Howe Avenue	
Summit	Cuyahoga Falls	7.15	11.51	5A	Broad Boulevard	
Summit	Cuyahoga Falls	7.34	11.81	5B	Portage Trail	Eastbound exit / westbound entrance only
Summit	Cuyahoga Falls	8.16	13.13		SR 8 north – Cleveland	Eastern end of SR 8 concurrency
Summit	Cuyahoga Falls			Northern end of freeway		
Summit	Stow	10.46	16.83		SR 91 (Darrow Road)	
Portage	Kent	14.13	22.74		SR 43 (South Mantua Street)	Western end of SR 43 (southbound) concurrency; no access to South Mantua Street
Portage	Kent	14.50	23.34		SR 43 north (River Street)	Western end of SR 43 (northbound) concurrency
Portage	Kent	14.81	23.83		SR 43 (South Water Street)	Eastern end of SR 43 concurrency
Portage	Franklin Township	16.78	27.00		SR 261 west	Eastern terminus of SR 261
Portage	Ravenna	21.41	34.46		SR 88 north (Freedom Street)	Southern terminus of SR 88
Portage	Ravenna Township	22.17	35.68		SR 14 / SR 44	
Portage	Ravenna Township	22.99	37.00		SR 5 east	No access from SR 5 eastbound to SR 59
1.000 mi = 1.609 km; 1.000 km = 0.621 mi: Concurrency terminus; Incomplete access
