= Record-Courier (Ohio) =

American daily newspaper in Portage County, Ohio

- Front page of the Record-Courier; 28 August 2013
- Type: Daily newspaper
- Format: Broadsheet
- Owner: USA Today Co.
- Editor: Cheryl Powell
- Founded: 1830
- Circulation: 9,651 (as of 2018)
- Website: record-courier.com

The Record-Courier is an American daily newspaper in Portage County, Ohio, based in Ravenna. It is published by USA Today Co. after having previously been owned by Dix Communications of Kent and Wooster, Ohio, until 2017.

== History ==
The historical origins of the modern Record-Courier begin with the Ohio Star, which was first printed in 1830. In 1854 it merged with the Home Companion and Whig to become the Portage County Democrat, which supported the Free Soil Party and the Know Nothings. As those views became tied to the Republican Party, the paper supported the Union in the American Civil War and changed its name to the Portage Co. Republican Democrat after the war in 1868. In 1882, the paper bought the Portage County Republican and merged the two to create the Ravenna Republican. It would continue under this name until 1928, when it began a series of name changes until it settled on the Record-Courier in 1961.

In March 2019, an investigation by Snopes found that the name "Ohio Star" was used by Republican consultants as one of many propaganda websites disguised as local news sites that would promote the politicians who hired them. Many of the writers on these sites, which often share content, have worked for political action committee supporting the politicians they cover, or directly on those politicians' campaigns.

Earlier version of the title page, from 2009

== Current staff members ==
After Gannett purchased Gatehouse Media, most former Record-Courier staff members who served under Dix Communications leadership staffers were absorbed by the Akron Beacon Journal (also a Gannett property), left the newspaper for new jobs, were bought out or laid off.

As of 2025, there were only three remaining staff members.

== More information ==
The Record-Courier is published daily except New Years Day, MLK Day, Presidents Day, Memorial Day, Independence Day, Labor Day, Columbus Day, Thanksgiving and Christmas.
