= List of people from Akron, Ohio =

The following people were all born in or were residents of the city of Akron, Ohio, United States.

Name	Occupation/industry	Description	Association	Reference
Henry Eugene Abbey	Theatre	Theatre manager and producer	Born in Akron	
Richard F. Abel	Military	U.S. Air Force brigadier general	Born in Akron	
John R. Adams	Judge	Federal judge on U.S. District Court for Northern District of Ohio	Practiced in Akron	
James E. Akins	Politician	U.S. Ambassador to Saudi Arabia from 1973 to 1976	Born and raised in Akron	
Lola Albright	Actress and singer	Starred in TV series Peter Gunn and films such as Kid Galahad	Born and raised in Akron	
Andy Alleman	Athlete	Football center for Miami Dolphins	Born in Akron	
Harold Anderson	Athlete	Basketball coach at Bowling Green State and University of Toledo	Born in Akron	
R. W. Apple, Jr.	Writer	Editor, writer for The New York Times	Born in Akron	
Joseph Arthur	Musician	Musician and artist	Born and raised in Akron	
Dan Auerbach	Musician	Solo musician, guitarist for The Black Keys, owner of Akron Analog Recording Studios	Born and raised in Akron	
William Hanes Ayres	Politician	Republican member of U.S. House of Representatives	Represented Akron in Congress	
Josh Azzarella	Artist	Artist	Born in Akron	
E.T. Barnette	Politician	Founder of Fairbanks, Alaska and its first mayor	Born in Akron	
Alice M. Batchelder	Attorney	Attorney and jurist, currently chief judge of U.S. Court of Appeals for Sixth Circuit	Practiced in Akron	
Elsworth R. Bathrick	Politician	U.S. representative	Worked in Akron	
Tom Batiuk	Cartoonist	Comic strip creator (Funky Winkerbean, Crankshaft)	Born in Akron	
Cliff Battles	Athlete	Football player	Born in Akron	
Margaret Baxtresser	Musician	Classical pianist	Supporter of Akron	
Art Becker	Athlete	Basketball player	Born in Akron	
Sam H. Bell	Judge	Federal judge on U.S. District Court for Northern District of Ohio	Practiced in Akron	
Terry Bevington	Athlete	Baseball player and manager	Born in Akron	
Lucius V. Bierce	Politician and military officer	Mayor of Akron, state senator, Union Army officer, commander in Patriot War	Lived in Akron	
George Bliss	Politician	Congressman	Practiced and worked in Akron	
Ray C. Bliss	Politician	Republican Party leader	Born and worked in Akron	
Mark Bloch	Artist	Artist	Raised in Akron	
Jim Boeke	Athlete	Football player	Born and raised in Akron	
Phil Boggs	Athlete	Diver, 1976 Olympic gold medalist	Born and raised in Akron	
Dante Booker	Athlete	Football player	Born and raised in Akron	
Rosario Borgio	Criminal	Mobster	Worked in Akron	
William Boyett	Actor	Actor	Born in Akron	
Dave Brown	Athlete	Football player	Born and raised in Akron	
John Brown	Politician	Abolitionist	Worked in Akron	
Walter Hermann Bucher	Scientist	Geologist and paleontologist	Born in Akron	
Michael Buckley	Writer	Author of The Sisters Grimm and NERDS series	Born in Akron	
E. J. Burt	Athlete	Football player	Born and raised in Akron	
River Butcher	Actor	Stand-up comic, co-creator and co-star of Take My Wife	Born and raised in Akron	
Jimmy Butler	Actor	Actor	Born in Akron	
Glen Buxton	Musician	Guitarist for Alice Cooper	Born in Akron	
Patrick Carney	Musician	Drummer for The Black Keys, bassist for band Drummer	Born and raised in Akron	
Gilbert S. Carpenter	US Army brigadier general	Veteran of the American Civil War, American Indian Wars, Spanish–American War, and Philippine–American War	Raised in Akron, lived there in retirement	
Bob Casale	Musician	Musician, Devo	Raised in Akron	
Gerald Casale	Musician	Musician, Devo	Raised in Akron	
Len Chandler	Musician	Folk musician	Born in Akron	
David Allan Coe	Singer	Country music artist	Born in Akron	
Russell Coffey	Military	World War I veteran	Lived in Akron	
Dellmus Colvin	Serial killer	Truck driver who kidnapped and murdered 6 women	Raised in Akron	
Arthur L. Conger	Historian	Theosophist	Born in Akron	
Deborah L. Cook	Judge	Federal judge on U.S. Court of Appeals for Sixth Circuit	Practiced in Akron	
Jarrod Cooper	Athlete	Football player	Born in Akron	
MacNolia Cox	Student	First African-American to reach last five of National Spelling Bee	Born in Akron	
Cheryl Crawford	Theatre	Director and producer	Born in Akron	
Mark Croghan	Athlete	Five-time national champion in steeplechase	Born in Akron	
Stephen Curry	Athlete	Basketball player for Golden State Warriors, four-time NBA champion	Born in Akron	
Ruby Nash Curtis	Singer	Singer of Ruby & The Romantics	Born in Akron	
Hammer Damage	Singer	Rock band	Formed in Akron	
Keith Dambrot	Athlete	Basketball coach	Born, raised, and worked in Akron	
Jimmy Darrow	Athlete	Basketball player	Born in Akron	
Red Daum	Football end	NFL player (Akron Pros)	Born in Akron	
John Dean	Politician	White House counsel to Richard Nixon		
Charles W. F. Dick	Politician	U.S. senator (Republican)		
Frank Dicopoulos	Actor	Actor		
Michael Dokes	Athlete	Boxer, WBA World Heavyweight Champion 1982–1983	Born in Akron	
Lloyd C. Douglas	Minister	Minister, author		
Rita Dove	Writer	Poet		
Hugh Downs	TV	TV journalist and personality, 20/20		
Peter C. Economus	Judge	Federal judge on U.S. District Court for Northern District of Ohio	Practiced in Akron	
Sidney Edgerton	Politician	19th-century politician		
Bruce L. Edwards	Academic and author	Bowling Green State University professor and C. S. Lewis scholar	Born in Akron	
Eddie Elias	Athlete	Founder of Professional Bowlers Assn.		
Harold G. Epperson	Military	Decorated U.S. Marine		
Eugene C. Eppley	Corporate executive	Hotel mogul		
Angie Everhart	Actress	Model and actress		
Fritzi Fern	Actress	Actress		
Harvey Samuel Firestone	Corporate executive	Founder of Firestone Tire and Rubber Company	Lived in Akron	
Leonard Firestone	Corporate executive	Industrialist		
Steve Fitzhugh	Athlete	Football player		
Art Fleming	TV	TV game show host, Jeopardy		
Carol Folt	College executive	President, University of Southern California	Born in Akron	
Martha Firestone Ford	Business executive	Owner and chairwoman of NFL's Detroit Lions	Born in Akron	
Trent Ford	Actor	Actor, model		
Mike Fox	Athlete	Football player		
Elizabeth Franz	Actress	Tony Award and Obie Award-winning actress		
Shirley Fry	Athlete	Tennis player		
Ruby Nash Garnett	Singer	Singer of Ruby & the Romantics	Born in Akron	
William H. Gerstenmaier	NASA	NASA administrator		
Joe Glazer	Musician	Musician		
Dick Goddard	Scientist	Meteorologist		
Harvey Gold	Musician	Musician		
Bob Golic	Athlete	Football player, radio personality		
Mike Golic	Athlete	Football player		
Benjamin Goodrich	Corporate executive	Founder of B.F. Goodrich Company		
Jim Graner	TV	Sports anchor at WKYC; color commentator for Cleveland Browns radio	Born in Akron	
Brad Guigar	Cartoonist	Cartoonist		
James S. Gwin	Judge	Federal judge on U.S. District Court for Northern District of Ohio	Practiced in Akron	
Kris Haines	Athlete	Football player		
Dave Hampton	Athlete	Football player		
Leon Harris	TV	Television journalist		
James Harrison	Athlete	Football player for Pittsburgh Steelers, two-time Super Bowl champion		
Dow W. Harter	Politician	U.S. representative		
Umar Bin Hassan	Writer	Poet		
Anne Heche	Actress	Star of films like Volcano, Psycho, Cedar Rapids		
John Heisman	Actor, athlete, coach	Football and baseball coach at Buchtel College (now known as the University of Akron); Heisman Trophy named in his honor	Lived in Akron	
Carol Heiss	Athlete	Figure skater, Olympic gold medalist, five-time world champion		
Daniel Hesidence	Artist	Painter		
Howard Hewett	Singer	Gospel and R&B singer		
Michael Holley	Writer	Sports journalist		
M. Herbert Hoover	Politician	Politician		
Roger Hoover	Singer	Singer, musician		
Walter B. Huber	Politician	U.S. representative		
Rex Humbard	Televangelist	Televangelist		
Craig Hummer	TV	Sportscaster		
Chrissie Hynde	Singer	Musician, leader of The Pretenders		
James Ingram	Musician	Singer, songwriter, two-time Grammy Award winner	Born in Akron	
Lux Interior	Musician	Singer and founding member of The Cramps		
Shirley Fry Irvin	Athlete	Hall of Fame tennis player	Born in Akron	
Ike Isaacs	Musician	Jazz bassist	Born in Akron	
Sandi Jackson	Politician	Politician		
LeBron James	Athlete	Basketball player for Los Angeles Lakers, four-time NBA champion	Born and raised in Akron	
Jim Jarmusch	Filmmaker	Director of films such as Down by Law, Broken Flowers		
David Jenkins	Athlete	Figure skater, Olympic gold medalist, three-time world champion		
Hayes Alan Jenkins	Athlete	Figure skater, 1956 Olympic gold medalist		
Helen Jepson	Singer	Soprano		
Gus Johnson	Athlete	Basketball player, television sportscaster		
Steve Johnson	Athlete	Basketball player		
Grandpa Jones	Musician	Musician, comedian (Hee-Haw)		
Melina Kanakaredes	Actress	Star of television series Providence, CSI: NY		
Salaria Kea	Nurse	Nurse		
Maynard James Keenan	Singer	Singer, Tool, A Perfect Circle, Puscifer	Born in Akron	
Dean Keener	Coach	Basketball coach		
Herman Keiser	Athlete	Golfer, 1946 Masters champion		
Charlton Keith	Athlete	Football player		
Phil Kline	Musician	Composer		
Bob Knepper	Athlete	Major League Baseball pitcher		
George Knepper	Historian	Distinguished professor at the University of Akron	Born in Akron	
Charles Landon Knight	Attorney	Publisher, politician		
James L. Knight	Writer	Publisher		
John S. Knight	Writer	Publisher		
Parke Kolbe	College executive	College president		
Heather Kozar	Model	Model; former Barker's Beauty on The Price Is Right		
Brock Kreitzburg	Athlete	Bobsledder		
Art Kusnyer	Athlete	Baseball player and coach		
Jani Lane	Singer	Lead singer of Glam metal band Warrant	Born in Akron	
Jerome Lane	Athlete	Basketball player		
Bob Lape	TV	Television journalist		
Robert M. Lawton	Politician	New Hampshire representative	Born in Akron	
Mortimer Dormer Leggett	Military	Civil War officer		
Menachem Leibtag	Rabbi	Tanach scholar and pioneer of Jewish Education on the internet	Born and raised in Akron	
Bob Lewis	Singer	Founder of Devo		
Thomas Lewis	Athlete	Football player		
Frank Fowler Loomis	Engineer	Inventor and city director of mechanical engineering	Born and raised in Akron	
David Lough	Athlete	Baseball player	Born in Akron	
Liam Lynch	Musician	Musician, puppeteer, Sifl and Olly		
Dylan Mabin	Athlete	Football player	Born in Akron	
John Magaro	Actor	Actor	Born in Akron	
Doug Marsh	Athlete	Football player		
Thomas E. Martin	Politician	Iowa politician		
Mike Massie	Politician	Wyoming politician		
Banjo Matthews	Athlete	NASCAR driver		
Andy McCollum	Athlete	Football player		
Moses McCormick	YouTuber	YouTube personality	Born in Akron	
Gates McFadden	Actress	Actress	Born in Akron	
Frances McGovern	Politician	U.S. representative		
Charles McGraw	Actor	Stage, film and television actor		
Marian Mercer	Actress	Tony Award-winning actress of stage, film and TV		
Paul T. Mikolashek	Military officer	U.S. Army lieutenant general	Born and raised in Akron	
Gene Mingo	Athlete	Football player		
Dan Moldea	Writer	Journalist and author		
Vaughn Monroe	Singer	Recording artist, actor, bandleader on Hollywood Walk of Fame		
Michael Morell	TV	ICIA director, TV analyst		
Brian Mosteller	Politician	Director of Oval Office Operations for President Barack Obama		
Bob Mothersbaugh	Musician	Musician, member of Devo		
Jim Mothersbaugh	Musician	Musician, member of Devo		
Mark Mothersbaugh	Musician	Musician, member of Devo		
Scott Muni	Radio	Radio personality		
Thurman Munson	Athlete	Baseball player, seven-time All-Star, 1976 American League MVP		
Ron Negray	Athlete	Baseball player		
John Neidert	Athlete	Football player	Born in Akron	
Donnie Nickey	Athlete	Football player		
Pete Nischt	Musician	Musician		
Gabe Norwood	Athlete	Basketball player for the Rain or Shine Elasto Painters		
Russell Oberlin	Musician	Musician		
Les Olsson	Athlete	Football player		
Stanford R. Ovshinsky	Scientist	Inventor and scientist		
Chris Owens	Athlete	Basketball player		
Tim "Ripper" Owens	Singer	Singer, replaced Rob Halford in Judas Priest; inspiration for movie Rock Star	Born in Akron	
Paige Palmer	TV	Fitness expert, TV personality		
John Parry	Sports official	Football official		
Ara Parseghian	Coach	Football coach, Notre Dame		
Jaroslav Pelikan	Theologian	Christianity scholar		
Simon Perkins	Founder	Settler, surveyor		
Ronald Phillips	Murderer	Child murderer	Executed for rape and murder of child	
Antonio Pittman	Athlete	Football player		
Terry Pluto	Writer	Sports journalist		
Shawn Porter	Athlete	Professional boxer		
Ricky Powers	Athlete	Football player		
Edward Pramuk	Artist	Artist	Born in Akron	
Richard Quick	Athlete	Swimming coach		
Robert Quine	Musician	Guitarist		
Willard Van Orman Quine	Philosopher	Philosopher		
Ron Rector	Athlete	Football player		
Robin Reed	Biologist	Cell biologist	Born in Akron	
James W. Reilly	Politician	Politician		
Nikola Resanovic	Musician	Composer		
Judith Resnik	NASA	Astronaut, killed in Challenger explosion	Born and raised in Akron	
Butch Reynolds	Athlete	Track and field star, gold medalist in 1988 Olympics		
Jennifer Niederst Robbins	Corporate executive	Designed the web's first commercial site		
Sydne Rome	Actress	Actress		
Edmund Rowe	Politician	U.S. representative		
Ed Sadowski	Athlete	Basketball player	Born in Akron	
Wilbur F. Sanders	Politician	Montana politician		
Thomas C. Sawyer	Politician	Politician		
Bo Schembechler	Coach	Football coach, University of Michigan		
Mark Schubert	Coach	Swimming coach	Born and raised in Akron	
Francis Seiberling	Politician	U.S. representative		
Frank Seiberling	Corporate executive	Founder of Goodyear Tire and Rubber	Born in Akron	
John F. Seiberling	Politician	U.S. representative		
Luke Sewell	Athlete	Baseball player and manager		
Chuck Share	Athlete	Basketball player		
Denny Shute	Athlete	Golfer		
Matt Simon	Athlete	Football player		
Harry Simpson	Athlete	Baseball player		
George Sisler	Athlete	Baseball player, member of Hall of Fame		
Richard Smalley	Scientist	Chemist, winner of Nobel Prize		
Bob Smith	Founder	Founder of Alcoholics Anonymous		
Neal Smith	Musician	Drummer for Alice Cooper		
Mark Smucker	Business executive	CEO of The J.M. Smucker Company	Resident of Akron since 2002	
Donald Ray Snodgrass	Author	Author		
Mark Stevens	Actor	Star of films such as The Dark Corner, The Street with No Name		
Chris Stuckmann	Film critic	Film critic, filmmaker, author, and YouTuber		
Betty Sutton	Politician	U.S. representative for 13th Congressional District	Practiced in Akron	
Tyrell Sutton	Athlete	Football player		
Emilia Sykes	Politician	U.S. representative for Ohio		
Rachel Sweet	Actress	Singer, actress and TV writer		
Michael Tarver	Athlete	Professional wrestler		
Gene Thomas	Athlete	Football player		
Nate Thurmond	Athlete	Basketball player, member of Hall of Fame		
Todd Tobias	Musician	Musician		
Aiden Wilson Tozer	Author	Preacher, author		
Bill Upham	Athlete	Baseball player		
William H. Upson	Politician	19th-century politician		
Claude Virden	Athlete	Basketball player		
Mike Vrabel	Athlete	Former NFL player and head coach of the New England Patriots since 2025		
Michael Wadleigh	Director	Director and cinematographer, filmed documentary of 1969 Woodstock Festival, Woodstock		
Ramon Walker	Athlete	Football player		
Brad Warner	Musician	Zen priest, musician		
Beanie Wells	Athlete	Football player for Arizona Cardinals		
Jesse White	Actor	Actor, known as Maytag Repairman in 1967–1988 commercials	Raised in Akron	
Shane Wiedt	Athlete	Professional soccer player	Born in Akron	
Josh Williams	Athlete	Professional soccer player	Born in Akron	
Wendell Willkie	Politician	Presidential candidate, lawyer	Worked in Akron	
Dan Wilson	Musician	Jazz guitarist	Raised in Akron	
Melinda Windsor	Model	Playboy model		
Antoine Winfield	Athlete	Football player		
Ray Wise	Actor	Known for films and TV series such as Twin Peaks, 24		
Sam Wise	Athlete	Baseball player		
Gene Woodling	Athlete	Baseball player		
George Younce	Southern gospel singer	Bass vocalist for the Cathedral Quartet	Resident of Akron	
Kim Zurz	Politician	Politician		

== Fictional people from Akron, Ohio ==
- Jiminy Glick, fictional talk-show host portrayed by Martin Short on film and TV
- J. Reid, in In Too Deep, played by Omar Epps
