= Martin L. Davey =

53rd Governor of Ohio

Martin Luther Davey
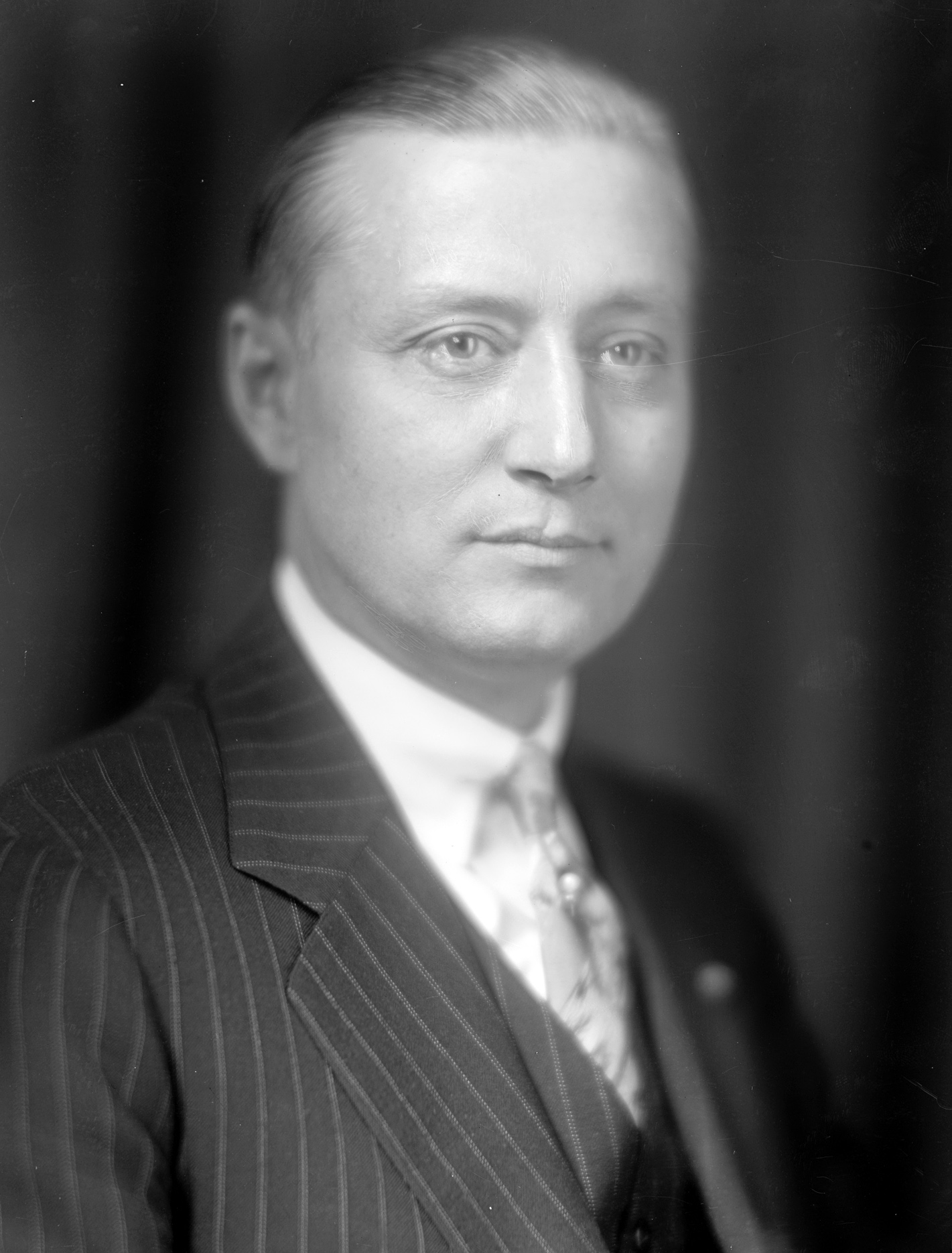

53rd Governor of Ohio
- In office January 14, 1935 – January 9, 1939
- Lieutenant: Harold G. Mosier; Paul P. Yoder
- Preceded by: George White
- Succeeded by: John W. Bricker

Member of the U.S. House of Representatives from Ohio's 14th district
- In office November 5, 1918 – March 3, 1921
- Preceded by: Ellsworth R. Bathrick
- Succeeded by: Charles Landon Knight
- In office March 4, 1923 – March 3, 1929
- Preceded by: Charles Landon Knight
- Succeeded by: Francis Seiberling

Personal details
- Born: July 25, 1884 Kent, Ohio, U.S.
- Died: March 31, 1946 (aged 61) Kent, Ohio, U.S.
- Party: Democratic
- Spouse: Berenice Chrisman
- Children: 3
- Education: Oberlin College

Martin Luther Davey (July 25, 1884 – March 31, 1946) was an American Democratic politician from Ohio. After serving in the U.S. House of Representatives, he served as the 53rd governor of Ohio.

== Childhood ==
Davey was born in Kent, Ohio, in 1884. His father was John Davey, better known as the tree doctor and founder of the Davey Tree Expert Company. His mother was Bertha Reeves, the daughter of a minister. Martin was one of seven children. His sister Mary and another sibling died before reaching maturity. His surviving siblings were Belle, Wellington, James (Jim), and Paul.

Their family struggled with money, leading the young Martin to start making and selling his own horseradish as a child. All of the profits from this went to help his family. He also helped with his father’s farm and greenhouse. He was an excellent salesman, developing friendships with his customers.

He attended a country fair where he heard the famous "Cross of Gold" speech given by William Jennings Bryan. This led to him wanting to be a politician.

== Education ==
Davey graduated from Kent High School in Kent, Ohio. After graduating high school, he worked for a time for the Oliver Typewriter Company in Cleveland, Ohio. He made $10.00 a week plus commission. He was an excellent salesman, and soon earned $200.00 a month. He decided to continue his education and attended Oberlin College, where he played football and was on the track team. He was third in his class, when he stopped his education to help found the family business. He returned to school for a time, until he met and married his wife. The marriage and birth of their first child ended his school career.

== Political career ==
Davey was elected mayor of Kent, serving from 1913 to 1918. In 1918, he was elected to the United States House of Representatives to fill the term of Elsworth R. Bathrick. He was re-elected in November, but lost another bid for re-election in 1920. He was re-elected in 1922, 1924 and 1926. In 1928, Davey ran for governor, but was defeated. He ran again in 1934, this time successfully, and won two two-year terms before being defeated in a bid for renomination in 1938 by Charles W. Sawyer. He was the Democratic nominee for governor in 1940, but lost to incumbent Gov. John Bricker.

== Family ==
In 1907 Martin married Berenice Chrisman of Kent. They had three children: Evangeline, Mary Bernice, and Martin Luther Jr.

Mary Bernice died in childhood. Evangeline married Alexander M. Smith. Martin L. Jr. went on to work at the family business.

== Legacy ==
Davey's family was known for their company, The Davey Tree Expert Company (founded 1880), located in Kent, Ohio. Davey Elementary School, located adjacent to the John Davey House property in Kent, is named after Davey, his father John, brother Paul, and son Martin, Jr.

The Davey Beef Building (erected in 1977 but no longer standing) at the Ohio Expo Center and State Fair in Columbus, Ohio, was named in honor of Davey.

== See also ==
- Ohio's 14th congressional district
- Ohio gubernatorial elections

Political offices
Preceded by George White	Governor of Ohio; 1935–1939	Succeeded by John W. Bricker
U.S. House of Representatives
Preceded by Elsworth R. Bathrick	United States Representative from Ohio's 14th congressional district 1918–1921	Succeeded by Charles Landon Knight
Preceded by Charles Landon Knight	United States Representative from Ohio's 14th congressional district 1923–1929	Succeeded by Francis Seiberling
Party political offices
Preceded by A. Victor Donahey	Democratic Party nominee for Governor of Ohio; 1928	Succeeded by George White
Preceded by George White	Democratic Party nominee for Governor of Ohio; 1934, 1936	Succeeded by Charles W. Sawyer
Preceded by Charles W. Sawyer	Democratic Party nominee for Governor of Ohio; 1940	Succeeded by John McSweeney
