= Ohio's 14th congressional district =

U.S. House district for Ohio

Coordinates: 41°45′06″N 81°01′05″W

- Interactive map of district boundaries
- Representative: Dave Joyce; R–South Russell
- Distribution: 74.05% urban; 25.95% rural
- Population (2025): 784,523
- Median household income: $74,527
- Ethnicity: 85.9% White; 5.1% Black; 4.2% Two or more races; 3.2% Hispanic; 1.1% Asian; 0.4% other
- Cook PVI: R+9

The 14th congressional district of Ohio is in the far northeast corner of the state, bordering Lake Erie and Pennsylvania. It is currently represented in the United States House of Representatives by Republican Dave Joyce.

As defined in January 2023, it contains all of Ashtabula, Lake, Trumbull and Geauga counties, and nearly all of Portage county.

== Recent election results from statewide races ==
=== 2023-2027 boundaries ===
Year	Office	Results
2008	President	Obama 53% - 45%
2012	President	Obama 53% - 47%
2016	President	Trump 55% - 41%
2016	Senate	Portman 59% - 36%
2018	Senate	Brown 53% - 47%
2018	Governor	DeWine 51% - 45%
2018	Secretary of State	LaRose 51% - 46%
2018	Treasurer	Sprague 54% - 46%
2018	Auditor	Faber 51% - 45%
2018	Attorney General	Yost 53% - 47%
2020	President	Trump 57% - 42%
2022	Senate	Vance 55% - 45%
2022	Governor	DeWine 66% - 34%
2022	Secretary of State	LaRose 62% - 37%
2022	Treasurer	Sprague 61% - 39%
2022	Auditor	Faber 61% - 39%
2022	Attorney General	Yost 63% - 37%
2024	President	Trump 59% - 41%
2024	Senate	Moreno 52% - 44%

=== 2027–2033 boundaries ===
Year	Office	Results
2008	President	Obama 52% - 46%
2012	President	Obama 52% - 48%
2016	President	Trump 56% - 40%
2016	Senate	Portman 60% - 35%
2018	Senate	Brown 52% - 48%
2018	Governor	DeWine 52% - 45%
2018	Attorney General	Yost 54% - 46%
2020	President	Trump 58% - 40%
2022	Senate	Vance 56% - 44%
2022	Governor	DeWine 67% - 33%
2022	Secretary of State	LaRose 63% - 35%
2022	Treasurer	Sprague 62% - 38%
2022	Auditor	Faber 62% - 38%
2022	Attorney General	Yost 65% - 35%
2024	President	Trump 60% - 39%
2024	Senate	Moreno 53% - 43%

== Composition ==
For the 118th and successive Congresses (based on redistricting following the 2020 census), the district contains all or portions of the following counties, townships, and municipalities:

Ashtabula County (38)

All 38 townships and municipalities

Geauga County (21)

All 21 townships and municipalities

Lake County (23)

All 23 townships and municipalities

Portage County (28)

Atwater Township, Aurora, Brimfield Township, Charlestown Township, Deerfield Township, Edinburg Township, Franklin Township, Freedom Township, Garrettsville, Hiram, Hiram Township, Kent, Mantua, Mantua Township, Nelson, Palmyra Township, Paris Township, Randolph Township, Ravenna, Ravenna Township, Rootstown Township, Shalersville Township, Streetsboro, Suffield Township (part; also 13th), Sugar Bush Knolls, Tallmadge, Windham, Windham Township

Trumbull County (36)

All 36 townships and municipalities

== List of members representing the district ==
Member	Party	Year(s)	Cong ress	Electoral history	Counties represented
District established March 4, 1823
Mordecai Bartley (Mansfield)	Democratic-Republican	March 4, 1823 – March 3, 1825	18th 19th 20th 21st	Elected in 1822. Re-elected in 1824. Re-elected in 1826. Re-elected in 1828. [data missing]	
Mordecai Bartley (Mansfield)	Anti-Jacksonian	March 4, 1825 – March 3, 1831	18th 19th 20th 21st	Elected in 1822. Re-elected in 1824. Re-elected in 1826. Re-elected in 1828. [data missing]	
Eleutheros Cooke (Sandusky)	Anti-Jacksonian	March 4, 1831 – March 3, 1833	22nd	Elected in 1830. [data missing]	
William Patterson (Mansfield)	Jacksonian	March 4, 1833 – March 3, 1837	23rd 24th	Elected in 1832. Re-elected in 1834. [data missing]	
William H. Hunter (Sandusky)	Democratic	March 4, 1837 – March 3, 1839	25th	Elected in 1836. [data missing]	
George Sweeny (Bucyrus)	Democratic	March 4, 1839 – March 3, 1843	26th 27th	Elected in 1838. Re-elected in 1840. [data missing]	
Alexander Harper (Zanesville)	Whig	March 4, 1843 – March 3, 1847	28th 29th	Elected in 1843. Re-elected in 1844. [data missing]	
Nathan Evans (Cambridge)	Whig	March 4, 1847 – March 3, 1851	30th 31st	Elected in 1846. Re-elected in 1848. [data missing]	
Alexander Harper (Zanesville)	Whig	March 4, 1851 – March 3, 1853	32nd	Elected in 1850. [data missing]	
Harvey H. Johnson (Ashland)	Democratic	March 4, 1853 – March 3, 1855	33rd	Elected in 1852. [data missing]	
Philemon Bliss (Elyria)	Anti-Nebraska	March 4, 1855 – March 3, 1857	34th	Elected in 1854. [data missing]	
Philemon Bliss (Elyria)	Republican	March 4, 1857 – March 3, 1859	35th	Elected in 1856. [data missing]	
Cyrus Spink (Wooster)	Republican	March 4, 1859 – May 31, 1859	36th	Elected in 1858. Died.	
Vacant		May 31, 1859 – October 11, 1859	36th		
Harrison G. O. Blake (Medina)	Republican	October 11, 1859 – March 3, 1863	36th 37th	Elected to finish Spink's term Re-elected in 1860. Retired to join the U.S. Army	
George Bliss (Wooster)	Democratic	March 4, 1863 – March 3, 1865	38th	Elected in 1862. [data missing]	
Martin Welker (Wooster)	Republican	March 4, 1865 – March 3, 1871	39th 40th 41st	Elected in 1864. Re-elected in 1866. Re-elected in 1868. [data missing]	
James Monroe (Oberlin)	Republican	March 4, 1871 – March 3, 1873	42nd	Elected in 1870. Redistricted to the 18th district.	
John Berry (Upper Sandusky)	Democratic	March 4, 1873 – March 3, 1875	43rd	Elected in 1872. [data missing]	
Jacob P. Cowan (Ashland)	Democratic	March 4, 1875 – March 3, 1877	44th	Elected in 1874. [data missing]	
Ebenezer B. Finley (Bucyrus)	Democratic	March 4, 1877 – March 3, 1879	45th	Elected in 1876. Redistricted to the 8th district.	
Gibson Atherton (Newark)	Democratic	March 4, 1879 – March 3, 1881	46th	Elected in 1878. Redistricted to the 13th district.	
George W. Geddes (Mansfield)	Democratic	March 4, 1881 – March 3, 1885	47th 48th	Redistricted from the 15th district and re-elected in 1880. Re-elected in 1882. Redistricted to the 16th district.	
Charles H. Grosvenor (Athens)	Republican	March 4, 1885 – March 3, 1887	49th	Elected in 1884. Redistricted to the 15th district.	
Charles Preston Wickham (Norwalk)	Republican	March 4, 1887 – March 3, 1891	50th 51st	Elected in 1886. Re-elected in 1888. [data missing]	
James W. Owens (Newark)	Democratic	March 4, 1891 – March 3, 1893	52nd	Redistricted from the 16th district and re-elected in 1890. [data missing]	
Michael D. Harter (Mansfield)	Democratic	March 4, 1893 – March 3, 1895	53rd	Redistricted from the 15th district and re-elected in 1892. [data missing]	
Winfield S. Kerr (Mansfield)	Republican	March 4, 1895 – March 3, 1901	54th 55th 56th	Elected in 1894. Re-elected in 1896. Re-elected in 1898. [data missing]	
William W. Skiles (Shelby)	Republican	March 4, 1901 – January 9, 1904	57th 58th	Elected in 1900. Re-elected in 1902. Died.	
Vacant		January 9, 1904 – November 8, 1904	58th		
Amos R. Webber (Elyria)	Republican	November 8, 1904 – March 3, 1907	58th 59th	Elected to finish Skiles's term. Re-elected in 1904. [data missing]	
J. Ford Laning (Norwalk)	Republican	March 4, 1907 – March 3, 1909	60th	Elected in 1906. [data missing]	
William Graves Sharp (Elyria)	Democratic	March 4, 1909 – July 23, 1914	61st 62nd 63rd	Elected in 1908. Re-elected in 1910. Re-elected in 1912. Resigned to become U.S. Ambassador to France.	
Vacant		July 23, 1914 – March 3, 1915	63rd		
Seward H. Williams (Lorain)	Republican	March 4, 1915 – March 3, 1917	64th	Elected in 1914. [data missing]	
Elsworth R. Bathrick (Akron)	Democratic	March 4, 1917 – December 23, 1917	65th	Elected in 1916. Died.	
Vacant		December 23, 1917 – November 5, 1918	65th		
Martin L. Davey (Kent)	Democratic	November 5, 1918 – March 3, 1921	65th 66th	Elected to finish Bathrick's term. Re-elected in 1918. Lost re-election.	
Charles Landon Knight (Akron)	Republican	March 4, 1921 – March 3, 1923	67th	Elected in 1920. Retired to run for Governor of Ohio.	
Martin L. Davey (Kent)	Democratic	March 4, 1923 – March 3, 1929	68th 69th 70th	Elected in 1922. Re-elected in 1924. Re-elected in 1926. Retired to run for Governor of Ohio.	
Francis Seiberling (Akron)	Republican	March 4, 1929 – March 3, 1933	71st 72nd	Elected in 1928. Re-elected in 1930. Lost re-election.	
Dow W. Harter (Akron)	Democratic	March 4, 1933 – January 3, 1943	73rd 74th 75th 76th 77th	Elected in 1932. Re-elected in 1934. Re-elected in 1936. Re-elected in 1938. Re-elected in 1940. Lost re-election.	
Edmund Rowe (Akron)	Republican	January 3, 1943 – January 3, 1945	78th	Elected in 1942. Lost re-election.	
Walter B. Huber (Akron)	Democratic	January 3, 1945 – January 3, 1951	79th 80th 81st	Elected in 1944. Re-elected in 1946. Re-elected in 1948. Lost re-election.	
William Hanes Ayres (Akron)	Republican	January 3, 1951 – January 3, 1971	82nd 83rd 84th 85th 86th 87th 88th 89th 90th 91st	Elected in 1950. Re-elected in 1952. Re-elected in 1954. Re-elected in 1956. Re-elected in 1958. Re-elected in 1960. Re-elected in 1962. Re-elected in 1964. Re-elected in 1966. Re-elected in 1968. Lost re-election.	
John F. Seiberling (Akron)	Democratic	January 3, 1971 – January 3, 1987	92nd 93rd 94th 95th 96th 97th 98th 99th	Elected in 1970. Re-elected in 1972. Re-elected in 1974. Re-elected in 1976. Re-elected in 1978. Re-elected in 1980. Re-elected in 1982. Re-elected in 1984. Retired.	
Tom Sawyer (Akron)	Democratic	January 3, 1987 – January 3, 2003	100th 101st 102nd 103rd 104th 105th 106th 107th	Elected in 1986. Re-elected in 1988. Re-elected in 1990. Re-elected in 1992. Re-elected in 1994. Re-elected in 1996. Re-elected in 1998. Re-elected in 2000. Redistricted to the 17th district and lost renomination.	
Steve LaTourette (Bainbridge Township)	Republican	January 3, 2003 – January 3, 2013	108th 109th 110th 111th 112th	Redistricted from the 19th district and re-elected in 2002. Re-elected in 2004. Re-elected in 2006. Re-elected in 2008. Re-elected in 2010. Retired.	2003–2013
Dave Joyce (South Russell)	Republican	January 3, 2013 – present	113th 114th 115th 116th 117th 118th 119th	Elected in 2012. Re-elected in 2014. Re-elected in 2016. Re-elected in 2018. Re-elected in 2020. Re-elected in 2022. Re-elected in 2024. Re-elected in 2026.	2013–2023
Dave Joyce (South Russell)	Republican	January 3, 2013 – present	113th 114th 115th 116th 117th 118th 119th	Elected in 2012. Re-elected in 2014. Re-elected in 2016. Re-elected in 2018. Re-elected in 2020. Re-elected in 2022. Re-elected in 2024. Re-elected in 2026.	2023–2027

== Recent election results ==
The following chart shows historic election results.

- "√" indicates victor
- "(inc.)" indicates incumbent

Year	Democratic	Republican	Other
1920	Martin L. Davey (inc.): 56,507	√ Charles L. Knight: 62,010	John C. Chase: 327
1922	√ Martin L. Davey: 49,935	Frank E. Whittemore: 46,087	
1924	√ Martin L. Davey (inc.): 62,314	Arthur W. Doyle: 60,251	
1926	√ Martin L. Davey (inc.): 53,659	Arthur W. Sweeney: 28,446	
1928	A. F. O'Neil: 58,848	√ Francis Seiberling: 106,253	
1930	Dow W. Harter: 60,951	√ Francis Seiberling (inc.): 61,628	
1932	√ Dow W. Harter: 93,057	Francis Seiberling: 78,852	I. B. Hinman (C): 708
1934	√ Dow W. Harter (inc.): 65,152	Carl D. Sheppard: 63,274	James McCarten: 2,089; Park Sumner (S): 1,194; Frederick W. Seibert (C): 1,066
1936	√ Dow W. Harter (inc.): 118,659	Carl D. Sheppard: 77,039	Park Sumner: 8,698
1938	√ Dow W. Harter (inc.): 87,303	Edward S. Sheck: 76,346	
1940	√ Dow W. Harter (inc.): 121,037	Walter B. Wanamaker: 108,016	Cornelius Kohlmyer: 2,527
1942	Dow W. Harter (inc.): 57,759	√ Edmund Rowe: 60,868	
1944	√ Walter B. Huber: 117,770	Edmund Rowe (inc.): 115,145	
1946	√ Walter B. Huber (inc.): 88,178	Fred W. Danner: 77,674	Harry Hurtt Jr.: 1,676
1948	√ Walter B. Huber (inc.): 125,346	Edmund Rowe: 92,535	Harry Hurtt Jr.: 1,273
1950	Walter B. Huber (inc.): 100,947	√ William H. Ayres: 102,868	Robert G. Brenneman: 7,246
1952	Walter B. Huber: 83,463	√ William H. Ayres (inc.): 117,475	
1954	John L. Smith: 68,204	√ William H. Ayres (inc.): 82,086	
1956	Bernard Rosen: 85,946	√ William H. Ayres (inc.): 123,105	
1958	Jack B. Arnold: 76,138	√ William H. Ayres (inc.): 114,827	
1960	John H. Mihaly: 91,103	√ William H. Ayres (inc.): 145,526	
1962	Oliver Ocasek: 86,947	√ William H. Ayres (inc.): 100,909	
1964	Frances McGovern: 104,547	√ William H. Ayres (inc.): 126,088	
1966	Charles F. Madden Jr.: 52,646	√ William H. Ayres (inc.): 77,819	
1968	Oliver Ocasek: 68,889	√ William H. Ayres (inc.): 84,561	
1970	√ John F. Seiberling Jr.: 71,282	William H. Ayres (inc.): 55,038	
1972	√ John F. Seiberling Jr. (inc.): 135,068	Norman W. Holt: 46,490	
1974	√ John F. Seiberling Jr. (inc.): 93,931	Mark Figetakis: 30,603	
1976	√ John F. Seiberling Jr. (inc.): 121,652	James E. Houston: 39,917	Steven P. Meyer: 2,619
1978	√ John F. Seiberling Jr. (inc.): 82,356	Walter J. Vogel: 31,311	
1980	√ John F. Seiberling Jr. (inc.): 103,336	Louis A. Mangels: 55,962	
1982	√ John F. Seiberling Jr. (inc.): 115,629	Louis A. Mangels: 48,421	
1984	√ John F. Seiberling Jr. (inc.): 155,729	Jean E. Bender: 62,366	
1986	√ Tom Sawyer: 83,257	Lynn Slaby: 71,713	
1988	√ Tom Sawyer (inc.): 148,951	Loretta Lang: 50,356	
1990	√ Tom Sawyer (inc.): 97,875	Jean E. Bender: 66,460	
1992	√ Tom Sawyer (inc.): 165,335	Robert Morgan: 78,659	
1994	√ Tom Sawyer (inc.): 96,274	Lynn Slaby: 89,106	
1996	√ Tom Sawyer (inc.): 124,136	Joyce George: 95,307	Terry E. Wilkinson (N): 8,976
1998	√ Tom Sawyer (inc.): 106,046	Tom Watkins: 63,027	
2000	√ Tom Sawyer*: 149,184	Rick Wood: 71,432	William C. McDaniel Jr. (L): 5,603; Walter P. Keith (N): 3,869
2002	Dale Virgil Blanchard: 51,846	√ Steve LaTourette*: 134,413	Sid Stone: 113
2004	Capri S. Cafaro: 117,197	√ Steve LaTourette (inc.): 197,779	
2006	Lewis R. Katz: 92,600	√ Steve LaTourette (inc.): 136,375	Werner J. Lange (Nonpartisan): 8,500
2008	Bill O'Neill: 125,214	√ Steve LaTourette (inc.): 188,488	David Macko (L): 9,511
2010	Bill O'Neill: 72,604	√ Steve LaTourette (inc.): 149,878	John Jelenic (L): 8,383
2012	Dale Virgil Blanchard: 131,638	√ Dave Joyce:183,660	David Macko (L): 11,536; Elaine Mastromatteo (G): 13,038; Write Ins: 6
2014	Michael Wager: 70,856	√ Dave Joyce: 135,736	David Macko (L): 7,988
2016	Michael Wager: 130,907	√ Dave Joyce: 219,191	
2018	Betsy Rader: 137,549	√ Dave Joyce: 169,809	
2020	Hillary "Toro" O'Connor Mueri: 158,586	√ Dave Joyce: 238,864	
2022	Matt Kilboy: 113,639	√ Dave Joyce: 183,389	
2024	Brian Kenderes: 140,431	√ Dave Joyce: 243,427	

== See also ==
- Ohio's congressional districts
- List of United States congressional districts
