= Hugh Campbell Wallace =

American businessman, political activist, and diplomat

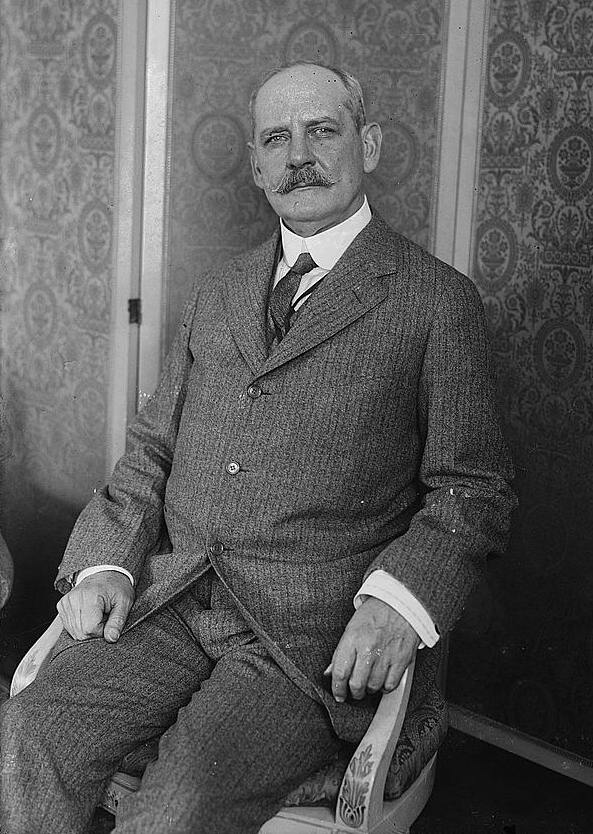
Wallace in 1919

Hugh Campbell Wallace (February 10, 1864 – January 1, 1931) was an American businessman, political activist, and diplomat who is best known for his service as the United States Ambassador to France from 1919 to 1921 under President Woodrow Wilson.

Wallace was born in Lexington, Missouri, son of Thomas Bates Wallace, Federal Marshall of a divided Missouri before the American Civil War, and Lucy Bruner Briscoe. Hugh Campbell Wallace served as receiver of public monies in Salt Lake City in the late 1880s. Wallace married Mildred Fuller, daughter of the Supreme Court Justice Melville Fuller in 1891. He later moved, along with his elder brother Thomas Bates Wallace, to Tacoma, and served as a representative of the state of Washington on the Democratic National Committee in 1892 and 1896. The Wallace brothers invested in the economic development of the Pacific Northwest including investment in electricity and ownership of a steamship line to bring passengers to Alaska during the Klondike Gold Rush.

He was presented with his credentials as US Ambassador to France on April 22, 1919.

Diplomatic posts
Preceded by William Graves Sharp	U.S. Ambassador to France; 1919–1921	Succeeded by Myron T. Herrick
