= William W. Skiles =

American politician

W. W. Skiles
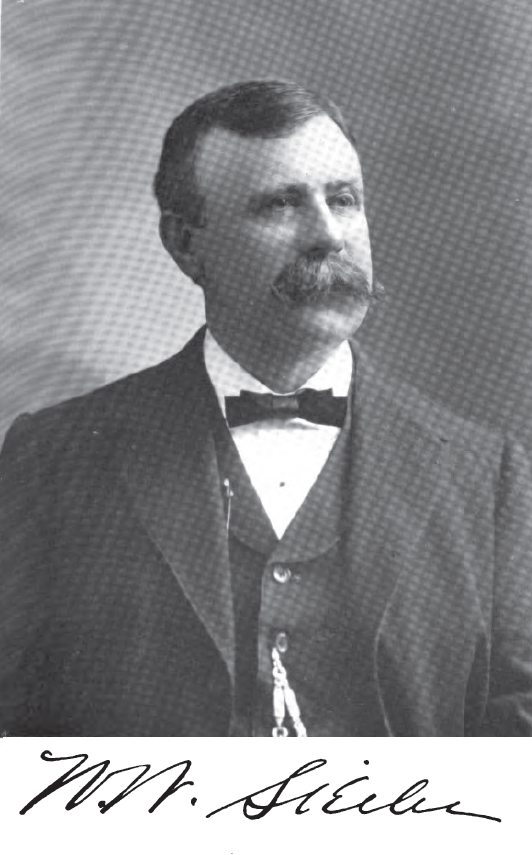

Member of the U.S. House of Representatives from Ohio's 14th district
- In office March 4, 1901 – January 9, 1904
- Preceded by: Winfield S. Kerr
- Succeeded by: Amos R. Webber

Personal details
- Born: William Woodburn Skiles; December 11, 1849 Cumberland County, Pennsylvania, U.S.
- Died: January 9, 1904 (age 54) Shelby, Ohio, U.S.
- Resting place: Oakland Cemetery (Shelby, Ohio)
- Party: Republican
- Spouse: E. Dora Matson
- Children: two
- Education: Baldwin University

William Woodburn Skiles (December 11, 1849 – January 9, 1904) was an American lawyer and politician who served as a U.S. representative from Ohio from 1901 to 1904.

== Biography ==
Born in Stoughstown, Cumberland County, Pennsylvania, on December 11, 1849, to John Gettis Skiles (c1820-1891) and Sarah Jane Martin (1823-1913), both of Cumberland County, Pennsylvania. His grandfather was William Martin. Siblings of W. W. Skiles were Mary Caroline Cramer (1847-1920), George M. Skiles (1852-1916), John Clark Skiles (1855-1906), Jennie Smith (1857-1939), Valletta Bell (1861-1945), and Burgetta Crum (1863-1925). Sarah Jane Martin had at least three sisters: Mary Hahn (-1867), Martha E. Mattoon (-1893), and Susan B. Roberts (1831-1910)

Skiles moved with his parents to Richland County, Ohio, in 1854 and attended the district schools in Shelby, Ohio.

=== Early career ===
He taught school for several years before graduating from Baldwin University in Berea, Ohio, in 1876.

In 1877, Skiles married E. Dora Matson of Shelby, and had two children.

He then studied law, was admitted to the bar on July 24, 1878, and commenced the practice of his profession in Shelby, Ohio, in partnership with his brother as Skiles and Skiles.

He was interested as a stockholder and director in various manufacturing enterprises. He served as president of the Citizens Bank from 1893 until his death. He served as president and member of the Shelby City School Board 1885–1904.

He served as member of the Republican State central committee from 1900 to 1904.

=== Congress ===
Skiles was elected as a Republican to the Fifty-seventh and Fifty-eighth Congresses and served from March 4, 1901, until his death in Shelby, Ohio, January 9, 1904. He served as chairman of the Committee on Patents (Fifty-eighth Congress).

=== Congress ===
He died during his second term in office, on January 9, 1904. He was interred in Oakland Cemetery in Shelby, Ohio.

== See also ==
- List of members of the United States Congress who died in office (1900–1949)

U.S. House of Representatives
Preceded by Winfield S. Kerr	Member of the U.S. House of Representatives from Ohio's 14th congressional district 1901-1904	Succeeded by Amos R. Webber
