= Michael D. Harter =

American politician (1846–1896)

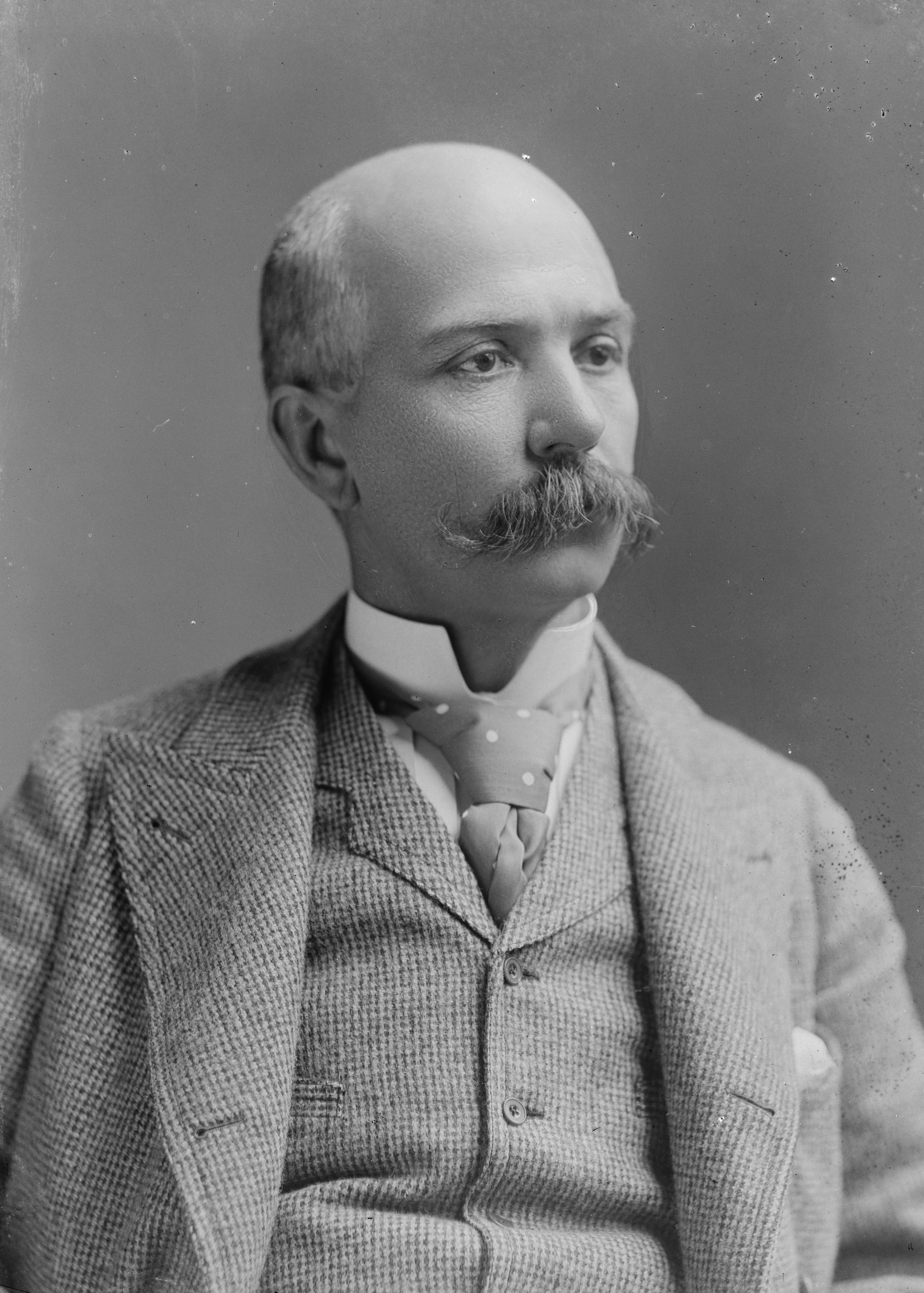
- Portrait by C. M. Bell c. 1891–1894

Member of the U.S. House of Representatives from Ohio
- In office March 4, 1891 – March 3, 1895
- Preceded by: Charles H. Grosvenor
- Succeeded by: Winfield S. Kerr
- Constituency: 14th district (1891–1893); 15th district (1893–1895)

Personal details
- Born: Michael Daniel Harter; April 6, 1846 Canton, Ohio, U.S.
- Died: February 22, 1896 (aged 49) Fostoria, Ohio, U.S.
- Resting place: Mansfield Cemetery, Mansfield, Ohio
- Party: Democratic
- Spouse: Mary L. Brown (m. 1869)
- Children: 5
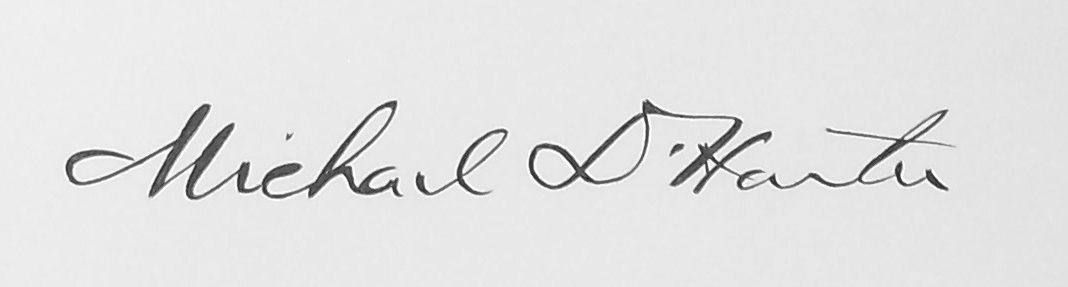
- Signature

Michael Daniel Harter (April 6, 1846 – February 22, 1896) was an American banker and politician. He served two terms as a U.S. representative from Ohio during the 1890s.

== Early life ==
Born in 1846 in Canton, Ohio, Harter attended public schools. He was a grandson of Robert Moore, who served as a U.S. Representative from Pennsylvania during from 1817 to 1821.

Harter engaged in mercantile pursuits and banking. He established the Harter Bank in 1866. In 1869, he moved to Mansfield, Ohio, and at the age of 23 became treasurer and manager of the Aultman & Taylor Company upon its organization. He also established the Isaac Harter Milling Company in Fostoria, Ohio, the largest producer of flour in the state.

== Congress ==
A Democrat, Harter was elected to the Fifty-second and Fifty-third Congresses, spanning March 1891 to March 1895. In Congress, he was strongly in favor of the gold standard, and against free silver, views in opposition to his own party. His views won out during the Panic of 1893, when Congress, in special session, repealed the Sherman Silver Purchase Act. Harter declined to be a candidate for renomination to a third term.

=== Tax policy ===
In 1894, Harter was one of six congressmen to vote in favor of a single tax amendment to the Wilson–Gorman Tariff Act. Proposed by Georgist and fellow Democrat James G. Maguire of California, it was intended as a substitute for the bill's proposed income tax. It would have levied a direct tax of $31,311,125 on land values nationwide. After this was rejected, Harter voted in favor of the original version of the bill, but did not vote on the final version sent back by the Senate several months later.

== Personal life and death ==
Harter was married to Mary L. Brown in 1869, and they had three sons and two daughters. After serving in Congress, he moved to Philadelphia but spent his summers in Mansfield.

=== Suicide ===
Harter died by suicide in Fostoria, Ohio in February 1896. His wife and children, except one daughter, survived him. He was interred in Mansfield Cemetery.

== Sources ==
- United States Congress. "Michael D. Harter (id: H000296)". Biographical Directory of the United States Congress.

U.S. House of Representatives
Preceded by Charles H. Grosvenor	Member of the U.S. House of Representatives from Ohio's 15th congressional district 1891–1893	Succeeded by H. Clay Van Voorhis
Preceded by James W. Owens	Member of the U.S. House of Representatives from Ohio's 14th congressional district 1893–1895	Succeeded by Winfield S. Kerr
