= William G. Sharp =

American politician

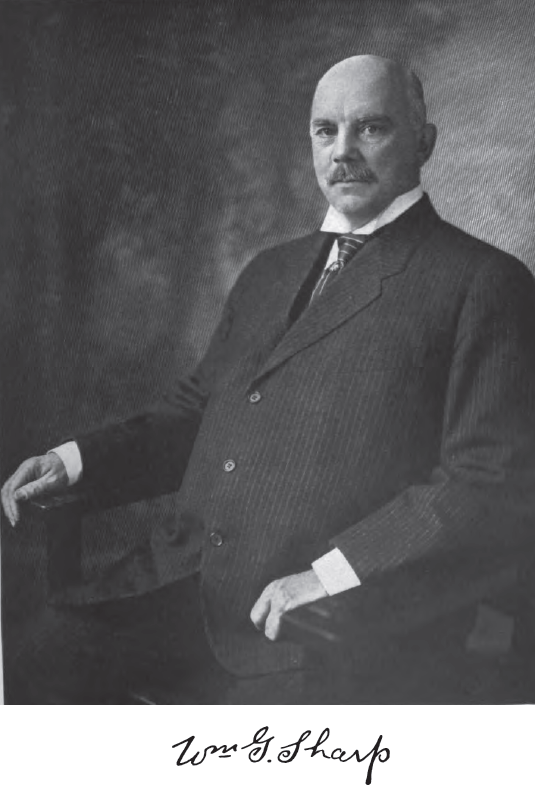

Member of the U.S. House of Representatives from Ohio's 14th district
- In office March 4, 1909 – July 23, 1914
- Preceded by: J. Ford Laning
- Succeeded by: Seward Henry Williams

43 United States Ambassador to France
- In office 1914–1919
- President: Woodrow Wilson
- Preceded by: Myron T. Herrick
- Succeeded by: Hugh Campbell Wallace

Personal details
- Born: William Graves Sharp; March 14, 1859 Mount Gilead, Ohio, U.S.
- Died: November 17, 1922 (aged 63) Elyria, Ohio, U.S.
- Resting place: Ridgelawn Cemetery
- Party: Democratic
- Spouse: Hallie M. Clough
- Education: University of Michigan Law School

William Graves Sharp (March 14, 1859 – November 17, 1922) was an American lawyer, diplomat, manufacturer, and three-term congressman, serving from 1909 to 1914.

== Biography ==
Sharp was born in Mount Gilead, Ohio, on March 14, 1859.

He moved to Elyria, Ohio with his mother and her parents, occupying the Starr-Worthington home on Washington Avenue.

=== Education and early career ===
He graduated LL.B. from the Law Department of the University of Michigan in 1881 and then practiced law in Elyria. He also engaged in the manufacture of charcoal, pig iron, and chemicals. From 1885–88 he was prosecuting attorney of Lorain County, Ohio.

=== Political career ===
He was a Democratic presidential elector in 1892, a Democratic candidate for Congress in 1900, and a member of the Sixty-first to the Sixty-third Congresses (1909–15), but resigned in 1914 to become Ambassador to France by appointment of President Wilson. He served until April 14, 1919, then returned to Elyria, Ohio, and engaged in literary pursuits.

Sharp was known as the Father of Air Mail due to his vision of using aircraft for postal delivery. He crafted legislation for this goal which was eventually successful in being passed.

He was one of two Elyrians to have served in Congress and also one of two Lorain Countians (Myron T. Herrick) to have served as Ambassador to France during the early 20th century.

=== Death and burial ===
He died on November 17, 1922, in Elyria, Ohio, and was interred in Ridgelawn Cemetery.

== Family home ==
The family's Elyria home was purchased in 1945 by the Washington Avenue Christian Church (Disciples of Christ) congregation which was relocating at that time from Elyria's Second Street. The Sharp home was incorporated into the church's new building, dedicated in 1951. Many of the mansion’s interior architectural details–including marble fireplaces, decorative ceiling mouldings, plaster reliefs on the parlor walls, and a beautiful grand staircase–remain.

Through the efforts of the Elyria Historical Association, Lorain County Historical Society, Ohio History Connection, and Washington Avenue Christian Church, an historical marker (Lorain County's 7th and Lorain County's 35th) was unveiled on the Washington Avenue property on September 3, 2020, with approximately 50 people present. Remarks at the unveiling were presented by the Honorable Frank Whitfield, Mayor of the City of Elyria, Mr. Bill Bird, President of the Elyria Historical Association, Ms. Kerri Broome, Executive Director of the Lorain County Historical Society, and the Rev. Nathan A. Russell, Senior Pastor.

== Sources ==
"SHARP, William Graves". Biographical Directory of the United States Congress.

U.S. House of Representatives
Preceded by J. Ford Laning	Member of the U.S. House of Representatives from Ohio's 14th congressional district 1909-1914	Succeeded by Seward H. Williams
Diplomatic posts
Preceded by Myron T. Herrick	United States Ambassador to France; 1914–1919	Succeeded by Hugh Campbell Wallace
