= Winfield S. Kerr =

American politician

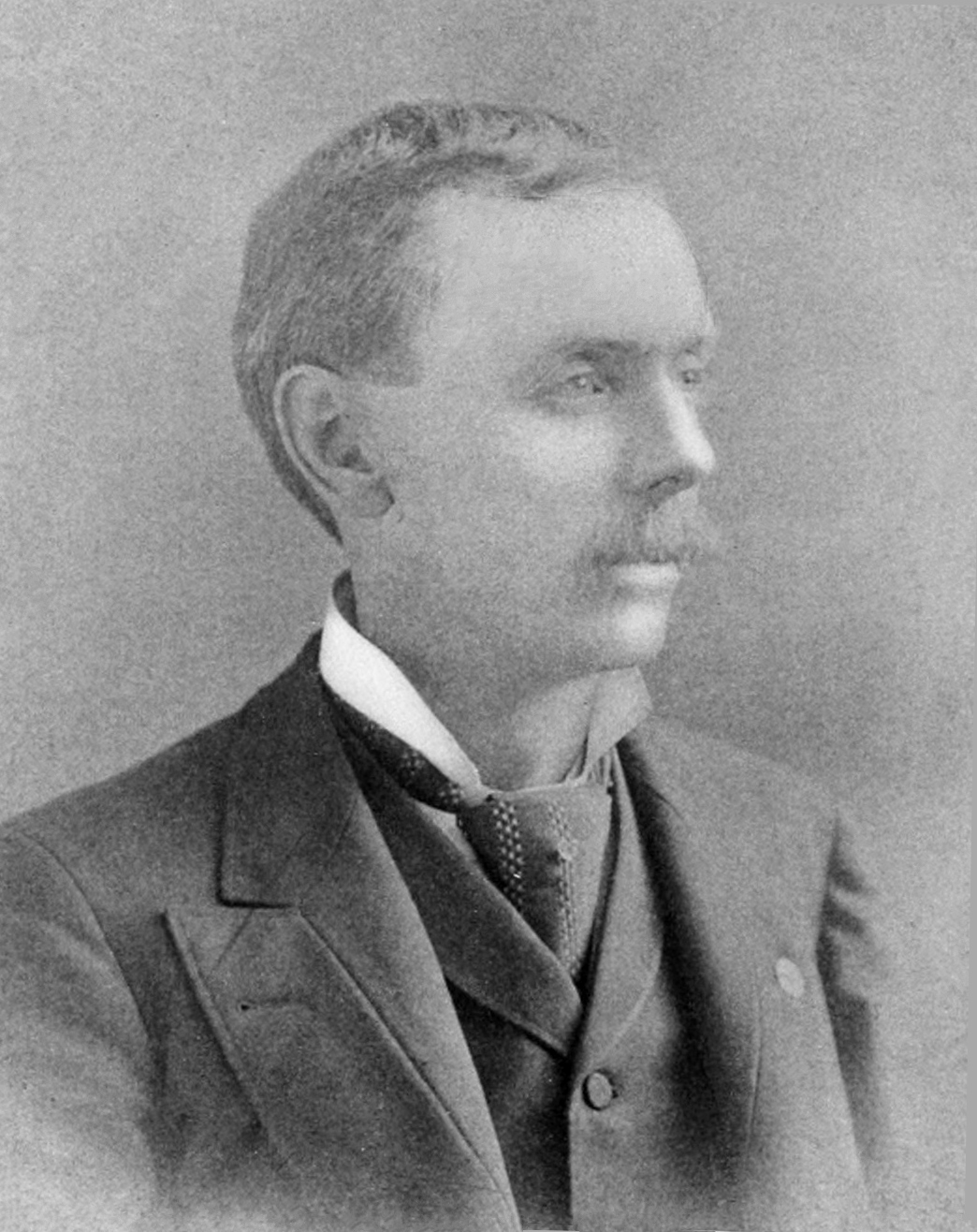

Member of the U.S. House of Representatives from Ohio's 14th district
- In office March 4, 1895 – March 3, 1901
- Preceded by: Michael D. Harter
- Succeeded by: William W. Skiles

Member of the Ohio Senate from the 27th & 29th district
- In office January 2, 1888 – January 3, 1892 Serving with George Hildebrand
- Preceded by: Charles C. Godding
- Succeeded by: George Hildebrand

Personal details
- Born: Winfield Scott Kerr; June 23, 1852 Monroe, Ohio, U.S.
- Died: September 11, 1917 (aged 65) Mansfield, Ohio, U.S.
- Resting place: Mansfield Cemetery
- Party: Republican
- Education: University of Michigan Law School

Winfield Scott Kerr (June 23, 1852 – September 11, 1917) was an American lawyer and politician who served three terms as a U.S. representative from Ohio from 1895 to 1901.

== Early life and career ==
Born in Monroe, Ohio, Kerr attended the common schools of his native city. He was graduated from the law department of the University of Michigan at Ann Arbor in 1879. He was admitted to the bar the same year and commenced practice in Mansfield, Ohio. He served as member of the State Senate from 1888 to 1892.

== Congress ==
Kerr was elected as a Republican to the Fifty-fourth, Fifty-fifth, and Fifty-sixth Congresses (March 4, 1895 – March 3, 1901). He served as chairman of the Committee on Patents (Fifty-sixth Congress).

== Later career and death ==
He was an unsuccessful candidate for renomination in 1900. He resumed the practice of his profession in Mansfield, Ohio, and died there September 11, 1917. He was interred in Mansfield Cemetery.

== Sources ==
- United States Congress. "Winfield S. Kerr (id: K000145)". Biographical Directory of the United States Congress.

U.S. House of Representatives
Preceded by Michael D. Harter	Member of the U.S. House of Representatives from Ohio's 14th congressional district 1895-1901	Succeeded by William W. Skiles
