= John Davey (tree surgeon) =

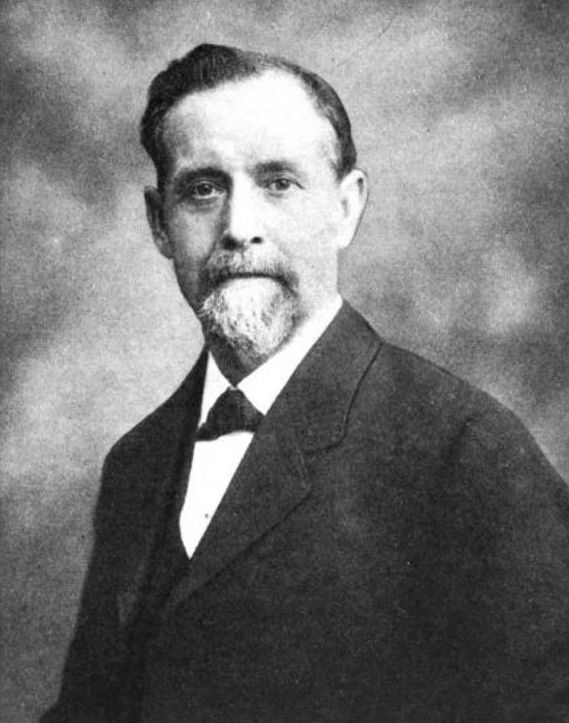
- Born: June 6, 1846; Stawley, Somerset, England
- Died: November 8, 1923 (aged 77); Kent, Ohio, United States
- Occupation(s): Landscape architect, tree surgeon
- Spouse: Bertha Alta Reeves (m. 1879)
- Children: 7, including Martin L. Davey

John Davey (June 6, 1846 – November 8, 1923) was an English-American landscape architect, considered the father of the science of tree surgery.

== Biography ==
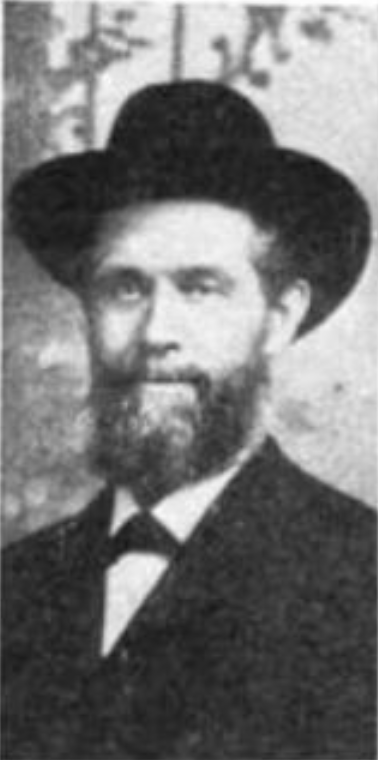
Davey in 1906

John Davey was born in Stawley, Somerset, England on June 6, 1846. Although he did not learn the alphabet until his early 20s, his intellect and analytical skills allowed him to become a skilled orator, author, publisher and inventor.

John Davey mastered agriculture under the tutelage of his father, the superintendent of a large farm, after which he served a six-year apprenticeship in horticulture, floriculture, and landscape architecture in Torquay. He developed a strong work ethic and passion for arboriculture. Davey believed that great lengths should be taken to preserve natural resources, especially those that take more than a lifetime to replace.

He took his convictions to America in 1873 in hopes of preserving ailing trees and providing quality horticultural services. He subsequently launched a landscape and greenhouse business in Warren, Ohio, where he worked for eight years. In 1880, he conceived the idea of tree surgery, after observing and studying trees as part of his landscaping business. This is regarded as the year he founded the Davey Tree Expert Company. The following year, 1881, he, his wife Bertha, and infant daughter relocated to nearby Kent, where he took charge of Standing Rock Cemetery, laying out the grounds, planting trees, and landscaping it. He published The Tree Doctor in 1901 and formally incorporated the Davey Tree Expert Company in 1909, establishing a school, now known as the Davey Institute, the same year.

Davey married Bertha Alta Reeves on September 21, 1879. He is the father of both Martin L. Davey, governor of Ohio from 1935 to 1939, and Paul H. Davey, founder of the Davey Compressor company. Davey also had sons Wellington, Ira, and James (Jim) as well as daughters Belle and Mary. John Davey died at his home in Kent on November 8, 1923.

Davey Elementary School, located adjacent to the John Davey House property in Kent, is named after Davey, his sons Martin and Paul, and grandson Martin, Jr. The Davey Tree Expert Company's corporate headquarters campus is located in northern Kent, a short distance from Standing Rock Cemetery. As of 2025, it has over 10,000 employees across the US and Canada, and is the largest employee-owned business in Ohio.

== Societal benefit/scientific advancement ==
Davey began to share his passion and science with the general public in 1878, when he published Davey's Floral and Landscape Educator, a monthly newsletter for his customers. His signature work came in 1901, when he self-published The Tree Doctor, a comprehensive arboricultural guide. It is generally acknowledged that this book spawned an industry - tree care - and was ahead of its time.

The Tree Doctor discussed Davey's inventions and laid the groundwork for future patents. Available for $1, it became the comprehensive resource for those interested in tree and landscape preservation, and featured a multitude of descriptive photographs to enhance understanding, a rarity in Davey's day.

He analogized tree surgery to physician care, effectively changing attitudes and perceptions. For John Davey it was simple. If you needed surgery, you visited the surgeon, not the local butcher. Likewise, trees needing repair should be examined and restored by "tree scientists", those versed in the latest methods of arboriculture.

Davey urged citizens and governments to adopt a scientific approach to tree preservation, and he used his expertise to champion the causes of environmental stewardship and urban forest preservation.

A prolific speaker on the Chautauqua circuit, John Davey would often waive his fee if the audience would promise to plant the seed packet that he had distributed at the beginning of the discourse. He employed innovative methods to communicate his passion for tree care, and often used lantern slide projections to illustrate his talks.

== Awards ==
John Davey received wide acclaim among the influential thinkers of his day. His recognition as the leader in tree science came through his company being retained by the United States and Canadian governments and scions of industry to protect, preserve and restore their precious trees.

For example, in 1920, he received acclaim from such clients as The White House, The Naval Academy, and innovators and entrepreneurs Thomas Edison, John D. Rockefeller and William Wrigley.

== Research/inventions ==
John Davey's inventions in the field of tree surgery were numerous, and included tree cavity filling, tree cabling and bracing, large tree moving and innovations in fertilization and disease prevention. He was the named inventor, joined by two sons, on two patents, and developed the research leading to twelve others patented by family members and employees of The Davey Tree Expert Company.

=== Pruning innovations ===
Among his most enduring innovations, now revised, was his theory of proper tree pruning. John Davey hypothesized that, just as a wooden house needs paint or waterproofing protection, tree wounds need to be sterilized and waterproofed to heal and remain impervious to decay.

He had also noted that improperly pruned trees were unable to heal themselves. He thus became an early advocate of proper pruning techniques, including an angled cut to conform to a tree's natural physiological processes. This proper pruning innovation was radical for the time period, and has only been adopted as the industry standard within the past 25 years.

=== Cavity filling ===
Davey observed that hollow trees often fell victim to wounds beginning as an exterior callous and inflicting decay inwardly on either side of the cavity. In response, he invented a cavity-filling process to replace the supporting surface artificially and to induce the callus to heal naturally over the face of the cavity.

Again analogizing tree science to the medical profession, Davey determined that tree experts, like dentists, could effectively fill a tree cavity with a special substance, disinfect it, and then apply a sealer to protect the wound. The tree's natural growth process would cover the cavity filling, preventing further damage and, most importantly, preserving a healthy tree.

Cavity filling is now considered to be damaging and is not part of modern arboriculture; avoidance of making large wounds is the modern approach, which entails avoiding interference with the natural decay compartmentalization processes.

=== Cabling and bracing ===
Davey's research demonstrated that certain trees by reason of their branching patterns were structurally weak. To preserve these trees, such as stately elms, Davey invented steel bracing and cabling methods that served as protection from the stress and strain associated with heavy winds and storms.

This allowed urban areas to prevent property damage due to falling trees. It also served to ensure the safety of pedestrians and homeowners.

=== The Davey compressor ===
John Davey's youngest and only son to serve in World War I, Paul H. Davey returned from his service and was placed in charge of research at the Davey Tree Expert Company. The young and ambitious Paul Davey developed and patented a lightweight air compressor to be used in tree surgery and developed his designs to the point that the Davey Compressor Company was incorporated in 1929 to begin production. the "Davey Compressor", an air-cooled compressor, was developed initially for use by The Davey Tree Expert Company however its uses would prove far reaching in the years ahead. The compressor was truly innovative for its time – it was much less bulky and more portable than the conventional water-cooled compressors of the day. The use of a finned aluminum head helped conduct heat away from the engine and therefore avoid the need for water-cooling. The new compressor, although lighter and smaller, easily matched the power output of conventional compressors, and allowed Davey to more efficiently use power spraying to remove decay from tree cavities. Paul Davey would go on to patent over 50 designs and improvements in the compressed air and related fields. The Davey Compressor Company thrived in Kent, OH and operated in the large factory that was once the repair shops for the Atlantic and Great Western Railroad Company. During World War II Paul Davey and his company turned the efforts of both his ingenuity and his factory towards war production. The company manufactured truck driven equipment, such as flood lighting and field servicing units, as well as compressors for military uses. After World War II the Compressor Company began production of truck mounted drilling equipment. Davey's new line of drills became a common sight putting in new highway right of ways, as well as drilling water wells, oil wells and blastholes. After years of continued success and growth with its drill rigs a new company was founded in 1981 by John Davey's great grandson and Paul Davey's grandson, Joseph Thomas Myers II. The new company, Davey Kent Inc. began the Davey Drill Division which still serves the world market for foundation and geotechnical drilling equipment.

=== Scientific study ===
A true scientist, Davey was committed to improving the technology and tools needed to advance tree care research. His company developed the rhisotron, an underground research station. The 4-foot- (1.2 m)square, 4-foot (1.2 m)-deep station featured one side of polished plate glass with a unique subterranean vantage point, allowing Davey to view and directly study tree root growth.

The invention propelled Davey to become the first to prove that tree root growth is shallow and lateral, as opposed to deep and vertical, the view common among Davey's contemporaries. This discovery led to the development of root fertilization and watering techniques designed to stimulate the growth of the tree.

Davey's passion for scientific study and knowledge led to his founding in 1908 of the Davey Institute of Tree Surgery. This cutting edge training facility was staffed by experts and dedicated to providing Davey employees with the skill and tools needed to advance the science. The Davey Institute continues to this day to provide basic tree science as the educational foundation for company employees.

== Works ==
=== Books ===
- The Tree Doctor (1901)
- Davey's Primer on Trees and Birds (1905)
- A New Era in Tree Growing (1907)

=== Patents ===
The following patents were directly attributable to John Davey. He successfully defended his patents in 35 Federal District Courts. Each time these courts issued injunctions to prevent infringement.

- Patent #US890967A (1908): Means for Tying Tree Branches Together

As part of the science of tree surgery, John Davey patented the method allowing for the bracing of two branches to avoid further splitting where a wound existed at the base. This was done preparatory to surgery in order to maintain branch health. The mechanical apparatus consisted of a chain link device with hook bolts and a shank at either end, allowing the tied branches to move as a unit rather than through separate, divisive forces.

- Patent #US890968A (1908): Process of Treating and Dressing a Bruise or Wound in the Trunk or Live Branch of a Live Tree

This process, pioneered and patented by John Davey, helped preserve and revitalize injured and/or dying trees through a method akin to surgery. By removing the decayed and unsound wood from the tree and then filling the wound with cementitious material and well-placed anchor ties, the tree could effectively be reinforced. The tree cavity was first coated with molten tar, and a drainage system installed, and a waterproof covering added to ensure sustained vitality.
