= Amos R. Webber =

American politician

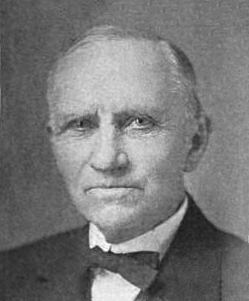

Member of the U.S. House of Representatives from Ohio's 14th district
- In office November 8, 1904 – March 3, 1907
- Preceded by: William W. Skiles
- Succeeded by: J. Ford Laning

Personal details
- Born: Amos Richard Webber; January 21, 1852 Hinckley, Ohio, US
- Died: February 25, 1948 (aged 96) Elyria, Ohio, US
- Resting place: Ridgelawn Cemetery
- Party: Republican
- Education: Baldwin University

Amos Richard Webber (January 21, 1852 – February 25, 1948) was an American lawyer and politician who served as a U.S. representative from Ohio from 1904 to 1907.

== Biography ==
Born in Hinckley, Ohio, Webber attended the public schools of Hinckley and was graduated from Baldwin University, Berea, Ohio, in 1876. He studied law, was admitted to the bar in 1876 and commenced practice in Elyria, Ohio.

=== Early career ===
He served as prosecuting attorney of Lorain County 1884-1890. He served as judge of the Court of Common Pleas of Lorain County 1900-1903.

=== Congress ===
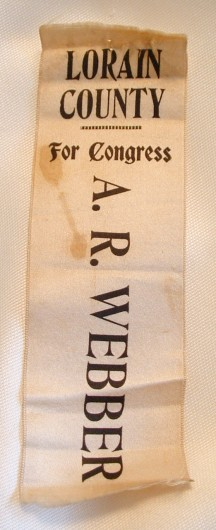
Campaign ribbon from 1904

Webber was elected as a Republican to the Fifty-eighth Congress to fill the vacancy caused by the death of William W. Skiles. He was reelected to the Fifty-ninth Congress and served from November 8, 1904, to March 3, 1907.

He was an unsuccessful candidate for renomination in 1906. He resumed the practice of law in Elyria, Ohio, and also engaged in literary pursuits.

=== Later career ===
Webber was again elected in 1922 judge of the court of common pleas, serving until his retirement in 1935.

=== Death and burial ===
He died in Elyria, Ohio, on February 25, 1948. He was interred in Ridgelawn Cemetery.

U.S. House of Representatives
Preceded by William W. Skiles	Member of the U.S. House of Representatives from Ohio's 14th congressional district 1904-1907	Succeeded by J. Ford Laning
