= J. Ford Laning =

American politician

Jay Ford Laning
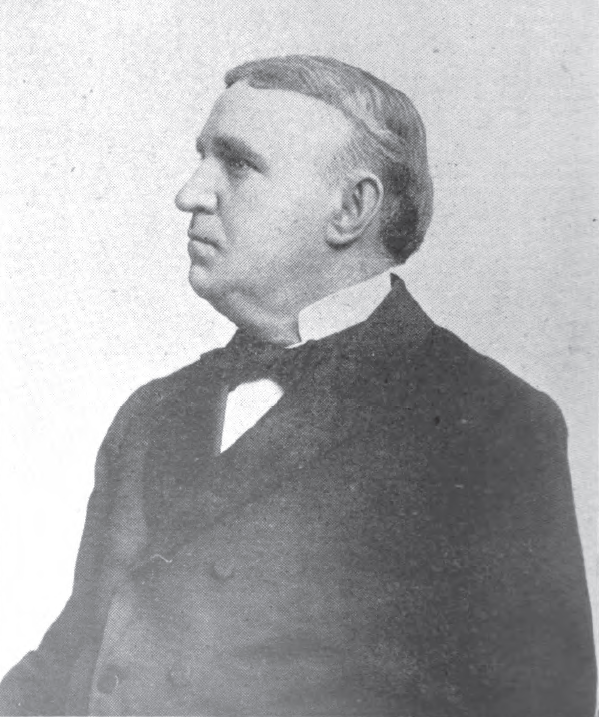

Member of the U.S. House of Representatives from Ohio's 14th district
- In office March 4, 1907 – March 3, 1909
- Preceded by: Amos R. Webber
- Succeeded by: William Graves Sharp

Member of the Ohio Senate from the 30th district
- In office January 3, 1894 – January 2, 1898
- Preceded by: Harlan L. Stewart
- Succeeded by: John Mitchell

Personal details
- Born: May 15, 1853 New London, Ohio, U.S.
- Died: September 1, 1941 (aged 88) Norwalk, Ohio, U.S.
- Party: Republican
- Education: Baldwin-Wallace College

Jay Ford Laning (May 15, 1853 – September 1, 1941) was an American lawyer and politician who served as a one-term U.S. Representative from Ohio from 1907 to 1909.

== Early life and career ==
Born in New London, Ohio, Laning attended the public schools, the Savannah (Ohio) Academy, and Baldwin-Wallace College in Berea, Ohio. He studied law. He was admitted to the bar in May 1875 and commenced practice in New London. Laning was the local Justice of the Peace from 1875 to 1881, and served as a member of the village council in 1876.

He moved to Norwalk, Ohio, in January 1882, where he practiced law until 1885 and then engaged in the publishing business. He served as a member of the city council 1887-1889, and was a member of the Ohio Senate from 1894 to 1898. He served as a delegate to the Republican National Conventions in 1904 and 1908.

== Congress ==
Laning was elected as a Republican to the Sixtieth Congress (March 4, 1907 – March 3, 1909). He was renominated in 1908, but withdrew and resumed the publishing business in Norwalk. He then devoted his time to the writing, editing, and publishing of law books and school textbooks.

== Death ==
J. Ford Laning died in Norwalk on September 1, 1941, and was interred in Woodlawn Cemetery.

== Publications ==
- Laning, J.F. (1896). "The Evolution of Ohio Counties". Ohio Archaeological and Historical Publications. V: 326–350.

U.S. House of Representatives
Preceded by Amos R. Webber	Member of the U.S. House of Representatives from Ohio's 14th congressional district 1907-1909	Succeeded by William G. Sharp
