= John Davey House =

Historic house in Ohio, United States

- U.S. National Register of Historic Places
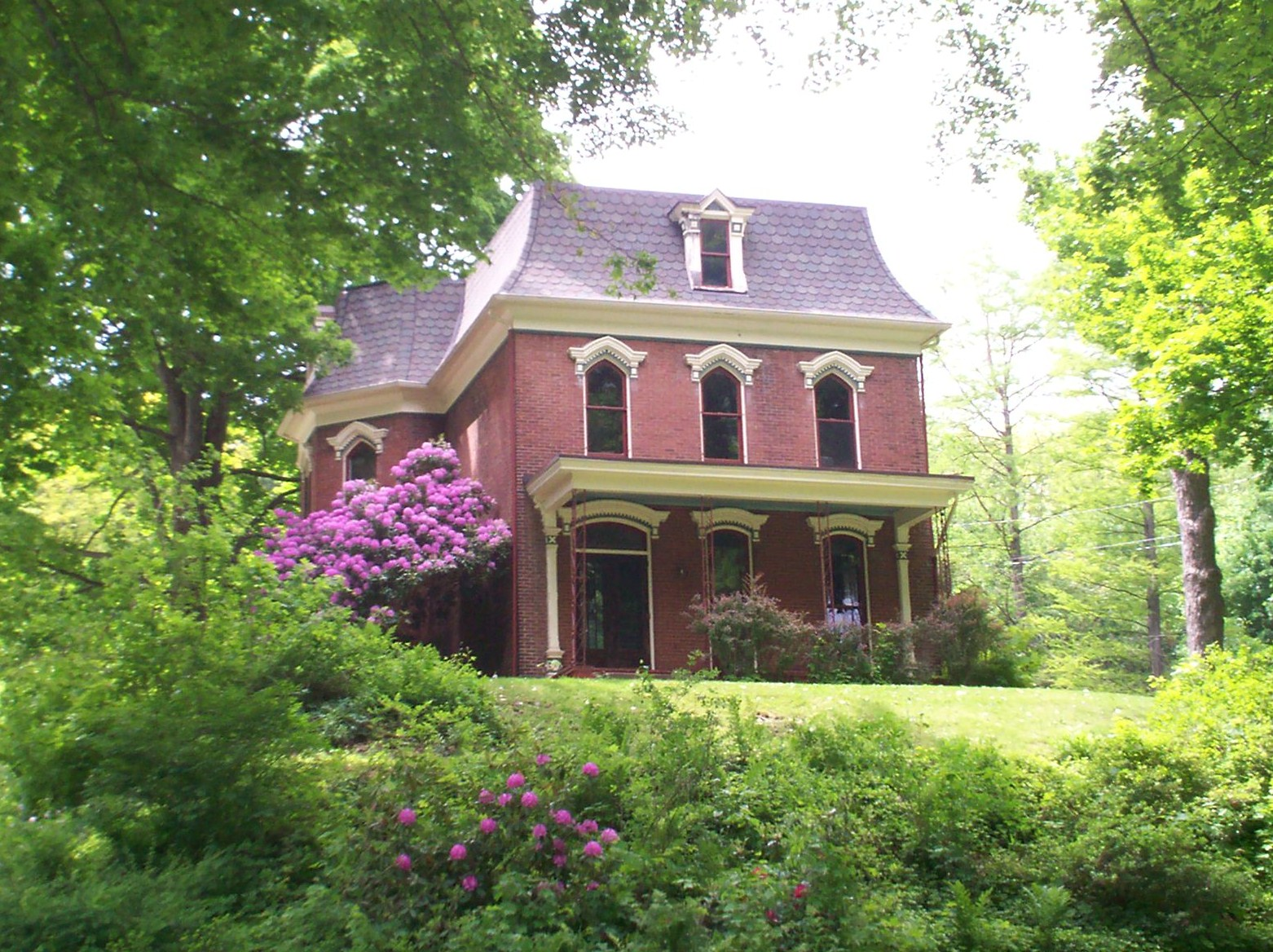
- Davey House in 2009

- Location within Ohio Location within the United States
- Interactive map showing the location of John Davey House
- Location: 338 Woodard Avenue; Kent, Ohio
- Coordinates: 41°9′31″N 81°21′55″W
- Built: 1880
- Architectural style: Second Empire
- NRHP reference No.: 75001524
- Added to NRHP: May 29, 1975

The John Davey House is a historic structure located in Kent, Ohio, United States. It has been listed on the National Register of Historic Places since May 29, 1975. An example of Second Empire architecture, the house is best known for being the home of John Davey, a pioneer in the science of tree surgery and the founder of the Davey Tree Expert Company. It is located on a hill at 338 Woodard Avenue in northwest Kent and was built around 1880. Davey called the house "Birdmount." It is currently a private residence.

== See also ==
- History of Kent, Ohio
- National Register of Historic Places listings in Portage County, Ohio
