= Murder of Eliud Montoya =

2017 murder in Georgia, US

Eliud Montoya, a naturalized American citizen, was murdered on August 19, 2017. Law enforcement authorities describe the murder as a contract killing undertaken by a fellow employee. The suspect, an illegal immigrant to the United States who worked at a tree care company, is alleged to have been motivated by evidence Montoya was preparing to present to the government to back up a complaint Montoya had filed with the Equal Employment Opportunity Commission alleging that this employee had skimmed millions of dollars from the wages of illegal immigrants working for the tree care company.

The suspect's brother, an illegal immigrant, and a third illegal immigrant the brothers hired as a hit man, allegedly drove to a spot near Montoya's home where they shot and killed him.

The case was covered by the press because of the complexity of a crime which was run by illegal immigrants who attempted to cover up their crimes by hiring an illegal immigrant to murder a legal immigrant to the United States who was preparing evidence against them for law enforcement authorities.

== Background ==
Two days before he was murdered, Montoya, a naturalized citizen of the United States, had filed a complaint with the federal Equal Employment Opportunity Commission alleging that Pablo Rangel-Rubio, an employee of the Wolf Tree tree care company where Montoya worked, was employing illegal immigrants and depriving them of part of their stipulated wages. Montoya alleged that the Rangel-Rubio brothers had profited to the sum of $3.5 million by paying workers less than they were owed.

Wolf Tree is a wholly owned subsidiary of the Davey Tree Expert Company. Wolf Tree had contracts with Georgia Power to trim trees along utility lines. Georgia Power contracts require Wolf Tree to verify that employees meet all employment eligibility regulations and laws, and to verify the identity and eligibility for employment of all employees using the federal E-Verify program.

Pablo Rangel-Rubio is accused of hiring illegal immigrants, lodging them in a trailer park he owned, and, together with his brother, siphoning off part of their wages for personal gain. He allegedly received the worker's paychecks, cashed them, and gave employees their wages in cash, retaining $10,000 of the worker's wages every week.

=== Equal Employment Opportunity Commission complaint ===
Two days before he was murdered, Montoya filed a complaint with the Equal Employment Opportunity Commission(EEOC) in which he alleged that Pablo Rangel-Rubio was running a scheme in which he employed illegal immigrants to work for him at Wolf Tree, and skimmed pay from the illegal workers he employed. Montoya had reported the scheme to corporate officials four months before filing it with the EEOC.

Immediately after the murder, Montoya's wife and mother turned the documents supporting the complaint Montoya had filed with the EEOC over to the police.

=== Victim ===
The murder victim, Eilud Montoya, was born in Mexwico and became a United States citizen in 2009.

== Killing ==
Montoya was shot near his home in Garden City, Georgia.

Authorities took Pablo Rangel-Rubio into custody within 24 hours of the murder. The FBI was called in to join the investigation within two days of the murder.

Pablo Rangel-Rubio is accused of paying $20,000 to have Montoya killed. Juan Rangel-Rubio and Higinio Perez-Bravo are accused of shooting and killing Montoya.

The death penalty for all three defendants is possible.

== Legal proceedings ==
Bobby L. Christine, U.S. Attorney for the Southern District of Georgia, charged Pablo Rangel-Rubio, 49, and Juan Rangel-Rubio, 42, two brothers both of whom are residents of Rincon, Georgia, and Higinio Perez-Bravo, 49, of Savannah, Georgia with murder. Pablo Rangel-Rubio and Juan Rangel-Rubio were charged with "conspiracy to retaliate against a witness, conspiracy to kill a witness, conspiracy to conceal, harbor and shield illegal aliens, and money laundering conspiracy."

== See also ==
- Illegal immigration to the United States and crime
