= Tom Sawyer (Ohio politician) =

American politician (1945–2023)

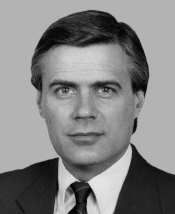
- Sawyer in 2001

Member of the Ohio Senate from the 28th district
- In office February 20, 2007 – December 31, 2016
- Preceded by: Kimberly Zurz
- Succeeded by: Vernon Sykes

Member of the U.S. House of Representatives from Ohio's 14th district
- In office January 3, 1987 – January 3, 2003
- Preceded by: John F. Seiberling
- Succeeded by: Steve LaTourette

58th Mayor of Akron, Ohio
- In office January 9, 1984 – December 30, 1986
- Preceded by: Roy Ray
- Succeeded by: Don Plusquellic

Member of the Ohio House of Representatives from the 44th district
- In office January 3, 1977 – December 31, 1983
- Preceded by: Paul Wingard
- Succeeded by: Tom Watkins

Personal details
- Born: Thomas Charles Sawyer; August 15, 1945 Akron, Ohio, U.S.
- Died: May 20, 2023 (aged 77) Akron, Ohio, U.S.
- Party: Democratic
- Spouse: Joyce Handler
- Children: 1
- Education: University of Akron (BA, MA)
- Profession: Educator

Thomas Charles Sawyer (August 15, 1945 – May 20, 2023) was an American politician of the Democratic Party. During a career that spanned five decades, he represented his hometown of Akron, Ohio, across multiple levels of government. He was a member of the Ohio House of Representatives from 1977 to 1983, the Mayor of Akron from 1984 to 1986, a member of the United States House of Representatives from 1987 to 2003, and a member of the Ohio Senate from 2007 to 2016.

== Early life ==
Sawyer was born in Akron, Ohio. After graduating from Buchtel High School in Akron, Sawyer received a Bachelor of Arts degree from the University of Akron in 1968. He also joined the Alpha Phi chapter of Phi Kappa Tau fraternity. Later, Sawyer earned a Master of Arts degree from Akron in 1970. He worked as an English teacher in Cleveland before seeking political office, winning a seat in the Ohio House of Representatives in 1977.

== Mayor of Akron ==
In November 1983, Sawyer defeated the incumbent Republican Mayor of Akron, Roy Ray, in a close election. Sawyer was the first Democrat to be elected Mayor of Akron in over 18 years. No Republican has held the mayor's seat in Akron since Sawyer upset Ray in 1983.

On December 20, 1984, during Sawyer's first year as mayor, an explosion at the Akron Recycle Energy System plant caused the deaths of three people. Sawyer helped manage the aftermath of the tragedy and assisted in the investigation. Speaking to the New York Times, Sawyer noted that S&W Waste, of Kearny, New Jersey, had sent the Akron plant waste materials containing highly flammable chemicals on the day of the explosions.

== United States Congress ==
Sawyer successfully ran for a seat in the U.S. Congress in the 1986 midterm elections and took office on January 3, 1987. He would then serve eight terms in Congress.

Congressman Sawyer gained notoriety as Chairman of the House subcommittee overseeing the 1990 U.S. census. He made national news with his study of the 1990 census and subsequent determination that it had failed to count at least two million black Americans. Sawyer and others attempted to readjust the census figures to include a more accurate count of black Americans and the U.S. population as a whole, but their efforts were opposed. When the Commerce Secretary Robert Mosbacher refused to adjust the census totals, Congressman Sawyer called the decision a "gerrymander on a national scale." The national undercount in 1990 was eventually estimated to exclude around 1.6% of the population.

=== Notable votes ===
In 1993, Sawyer voted for President Bill Clinton's federal budget bill. He voted against the Welfare Reform Act of 1996. Sawyer also voted against the impeachment of President Clinton. On the House floor during this debate, Sawyer quoted Sir Thomas More in defense of Clinton and in condemnation of the Congressional impeachment proceedings.

One of the most controversial votes cast by Tom Sawyer during his time in the U.S. House of Representatives was his vote for the North American Free Trade Agreement (NAFTA). Sawyer called his vote "the toughest decision I've ever had to make in public life."

Sawyer voted against authorization for the deployment of United States armed forces in Iraq in 2002.

=== Exit from Congress ===
==== 2002 primary campaign ====
A round of redistricting following the 2000 census redrew Ohio's congressional map. The state lost a seat in the U.S. House of Representatives. A newly configured district, the 17th, placed large parts of Youngstown in the same district as parts of Akron. The new district most closely resembled the one recently vacated by U.S. Representative Jim Traficant, who had been convicted on corruption charges and sent to federal prison. Traficant's protege, State Senator Tim Ryan, defeated Sawyer in a late upset. Sawyer outspent Ryan 6–1, but ultimately lost the election. Despite maintaining high pro-union ratings throughout his career, Sawyer's vote for NAFTA is often credited at the reason Tim Ryan defeated the 8-term Congressman.

==== 2006 primary campaign ====
Sawyer again sought to return to Congress during the 2006 Democratic primary. He aimed to replace then-Congressman Sherrod Brown in the 13th district, after Brown vacated the seat to run for the U.S. Senate. However, former State Representative Betty Sutton won an 8-way primary and went on to win the general election with support from national Democrats and EMILY's List.

== Ohio Senate ==
When Akron-based State Senator Kim Zurz was appointed to run the Ohio Department of Commerce in Spring of 2007, Sawyer was selected by legislative leaders to fill the vacancy.

As a member of the Ohio Senate Controlling Board, Sawyer voted to adopt Medicaid expansion in Ohio. Ohio's Medicaid expansion covered thousands of Ohioans who previously did not have insurance. The state share costs were offset by small insurance and sales taxes.

During the 130th and 131st General Assemblies, Sawyer jointly sponsored resolutions with Republican Senator Frank LaRose to reform the drawing of legislative district lines in Ohio. The House and Senate eventually passed a version of the senators' proposal and sent it to the Ohio voters as State Issue 1 in November 2015. The resolution passed with 71% of the vote. This law, once implemented, will end the practice of gerrymandering (partisan drawing of legislative district lines) for Ohio legislative districts. Senators Sawyer and LaRose at one time were working on a measure that would end gerrymandering at the Congressional level in Ohio as well.

During the 131st General Assembly, Senator Sawyer helped the legislature adopt House Bill 2, which was a version of Sawyer's Senate Bill 148, to reform Ohio's charter school oversight laws.

In the November 2008 general election, Sawyer held his Senate seat by defeating Republican James Carr.

In 2012, Sawyer was elected to a second full term, defeating Republican Robert Roush 71.5% to 28.5%. He served as Ranking Member of the Senate Finance Committee from 2012 to 2014.

In 2015, he considered running again for Akron mayor after the abrupt resignation of longtime incumbent mayor Don Plusquellic. Sawyer eventually decided against the run.

Sawyer's tenure in the Ohio Senate concluded at the end of 2016. The state's term limit rules barred Sawyer from seeking the seat for a third consecutive term. He was replaced by Democrat Vernon Sykes.

=== Committee assignments ===
- Committee on Education (Ranking Member)
- Committee on Finance (Previously served as Ranking Member)
- Committee on Public Utilities
- Joint Education Oversight Committee

=== Legislative commissions ===
- Ohio Constitutional Modernization Commission
- School Facilities Construction Commission
- Controlling Board

== Personal life ==
Sawyer lived in Akron. He and his wife, the former Joyce Handler, had a daughter. He died from complications of Parkinson's disease at a care facility in Akron on May 20, 2023, at the age of 77.

== Electoral history ==
Ohio Senate 28th District: 2008 to 2012
Year	Democrat	Votes	Pct	Republican	Votes	Pct
2012	Tom Sawyer	104,697	71.88%	Robert Roush	40,952	28.12%
2008	Tom Sawyer	108,168	68.36%	James Carr	50,064	31.64%

Ohio's 14th Congressional District: 1986 to 2000
Year	Democrat	Votes	Pct	Republican	Votes	Pct	Libertarian	Votes	Pct	Independent	Votes	Pct
2000	Tom Sawyer	149,184	64.80%	Rick Wood	71,432	31.00%	William Mcdaniel Jr.	5,603	2.40%	Walter Keith	3,869	1.70%
1998	Tom Sawyer	106,020	62.73%	Tom Watkins	62,997	37.27%						
1996	Tom Sawyer	124,136	54.34%	Joyce George	95,307	41.72%	Ryan Lewis	16	0.01%	Terry Wilkinson	8,976	3.93%
1994	Tom Sawyer	89,093	51.90%	Lynn Slaby	76,090	48.10%						
1992	Tom Sawyer	125,430	67.80%	Robert Morgan	64,090	32.20%						
1990	Tom Sawyer	90,090	59.60%	Jean Bender	66,090	40.40%						
1988	Tom Sawyer	159,090	74.70%	Loretta Lang	50,090	25.30%						
1986	Tom Sawyer	86,004	53.70%	Lynn Slaby	73,230	46.30%						

*Italics indicate incumbent

== See also ==
- List of United States representatives from Ohio

Ohio Senate
Preceded by Kimberly Zurz	Senator from 28th District; 2007–2016	Succeeded by Vernon Sykes
U.S. House of Representatives
Preceded by John F. Seiberling	Member of the U.S. House of Representatives from Ohio's 14th congressional district 1987–2003	Succeeded by Steve LaTourette
