= Walter B. Huber =

American politician

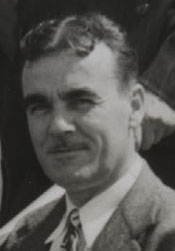

Member of the U.S. House of Representatives from Ohio's 14th district
- In office January 3, 1945 – January 3, 1951
- Preceded by: Edmund Rowe
- Succeeded by: William Hanes Ayres

Personal details
- Born: June 29, 1903 Akron, Ohio
- Died: August 8, 1982 (aged 79) Lexington Park, Maryland
- Resting place: Christ Church, Ironsides, Maryland
- Party: Democratic

Walter B. Huber (June 29, 1903 – August 8, 1982) was an American lawyer and politician who served three terms as a U.S. representative from Ohio from 1945 to 1951.

== Biography ==
Born in Akron, Ohio, Huber associated with the Summit County prosecuting attorney 1936-1944.

=== Congress ===
Huber was elected as a Democrat to the Seventy-ninth, Eightieth, and Eighty-first Congresses (January 3, 1945 – January 3, 1951). He was an unsuccessful candidate for reelection in 1950 to the Eighty-second Congress and for election in 1952 to the Eighty-third Congress.

=== Later career and death ===
Investigator for the United States Senate Committee on the Judiciary, Subcommittee on Patents, Trademarks, and Copyrights, from October 20, 1955, to April 30, 1958. Administrative assistant with House Subcommittee on Legislative Oversight from May 1, 1958, to January 3, 1959. Consultant with House Un-American Activities Committee from 1959 to 1968. Consultant with an environmental protection association. Resided in Nanjemoy, Maryland until his death in Lexington Park, Maryland, on August 8, 1982. He was interred at Christ Church, Ironsides, Maryland.

== Sources ==
- United States Congress. "Walter B. Huber (id: H000898)". Biographical Directory of the United States Congress.

U.S. House of Representatives
Preceded by Edmund Rowe	Member of the U.S. House of Representatives from Ohio's 14th congressional district 1945–1951	Succeeded by William H. Ayres
