= Edward Pramuk =

American painter

- Born: Edward Pramuk; 1936 (age 89–90); Akron, Ohio, United States
- Education: Kent State University, Queens College
- Known for: Painting
- Movement: Abstract Expressionism
- Website: edwardpramuk.com

Edward Pramuk (born 1936) is an American abstract expressionist painter. He has had numerous exhibitions in New York, Texas and Louisiana, and taught painting, drawing, printmaking and design at Louisiana State University for 35 years.

== Life ==
Pramuk was born in Akron, Ohio. He attended the Akron Art Institute and earned a BA and MA at Kent State University. He also studied at Queens College with Abstract Expressionists James Brooks and John Ferren. He taught at LSU for 35 years and retired professor emeritus in 2000.

== Works ==
Pramuk often works with the theme of nature in his paintings, especially marine images of the Gulf of Mexico. He also expresses his lifelong love of jazz through mixed media portraits of musicians like Billie Holiday, Miles Davis, Duke Ellington, and Wynton Marsalis.

I use imagined spaces, architectural motifs, and references to traditional painting to call up metaphors for my spatial concerns. I want to create a dream about the real, and at the same time to satisfy my interest in manipulating space. The fulfillment of this idea occurs when the weight of emotion generated by each pictorial situation is in harmony with an interior image. The revelation of images is the goal of my work.

His works can be found in both private and public collections, including the New Orleans Museum of Art; the Louisiana State Collection; the Pan American Life Insurance Group in New Orleans; the Paul and Lulu Hilliard University Art Museum and the Louisiana State University Museum of Art.

=== Accolades ===
2014: Honored as Forum35 Art Melt Louisiana Art Legend
