= John F. Seiberling =

American politician

John Seiberling, Jr.
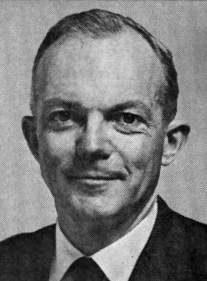
- 1973

Member of the U.S. House of Representatives from Ohio's 14th district
- In office January 3, 1971 – January 3, 1987
- Preceded by: William Hanes Ayres
- Succeeded by: Thomas C. Sawyer

Personal details
- Born: John Frederick Seiberling, Jr. September 8, 1918 Akron, Ohio, U.S.
- Died: August 2, 2008 (aged 89) Copley, Ohio, U.S.
- Party: Democratic
- Spouse: Elizabeth Behr
- Children: Three
- Education: Harvard University; Columbia Law School
- Awards: Legion of Merit

Military service
- Allegiance: United States
- Branch/service: United States Army
- Years of service: 1942–1946
- Battles/wars: World War II

John Frederick Seiberling, Jr. (September 8, 1918 – August 2, 2008) was a United States representative from Ohio. In 1974, he helped to establish what later became the Cuyahoga Valley National Park, and served on the House Judiciary Committee that held the impeachment hearings against President Richard Nixon.

== Early years ==
Born in Akron, Ohio, Seiberling attended the public schools of Akron, and Staunton Military Academy in Virginia. He received his A.B. from Harvard University in 1941. His parents, Lieut. John Frederick Seiberling (1888–1962) and Henrietta McBrayer Buckler (1888–1979), had been wed on October 11, 1917, in Akron, Ohio. He had two sisters: Mary Gertrude Seiberling (1920–2018) and Dorothy Buckler Lethbridge Seiberling (1922–2019). His paternal grandparents were Frank Seiberling, the founder of Goodyear Tire and Rubber Company, and Gertrude Ferguson Penfield. His maternal grandparents were Julius Augustus Buckler and Mary Maddox.

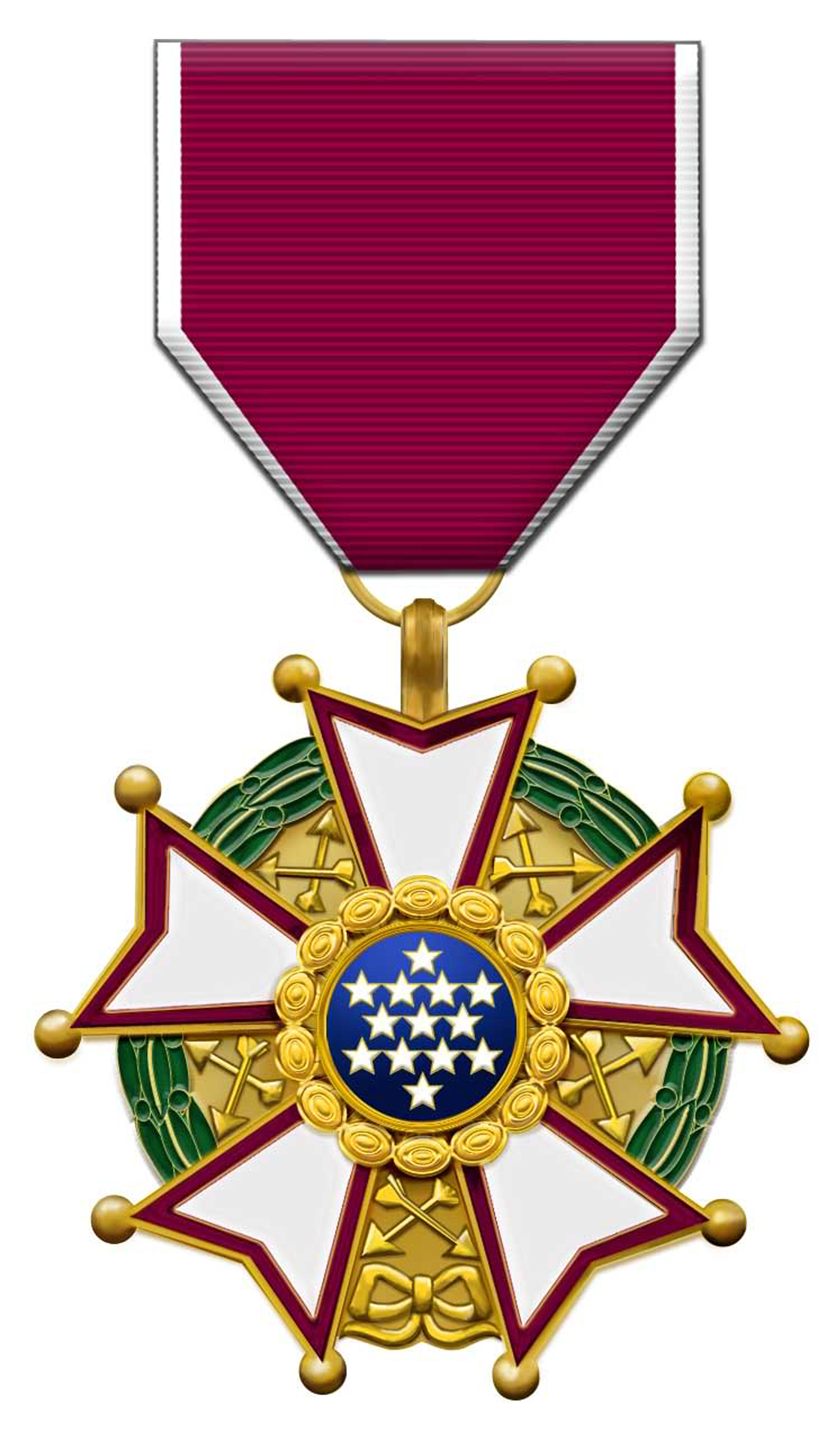
The Legion of Merit Award

== Army years ==
During World War II he served in the United States Army from 1942 to 1946. He was subsequently awarded the Legion of Merit for his participation in the Allied planning of the D-Day invasion.

== Education and law years ==
Seiberling received his LL.B. from Columbia Law School in 1949. In 1950, Seiblerling was admitted to the New York bar and went into private practice. He became an associate with a New York firm from 1949 to 1954, and then became a volunteer with the New York Legal Aid Society in 1950. From 1954 to 1970, he was an attorney with The Goodyear Tire and Rubber Company. He once took a leave of absence rather than cross the picket lines during a United Rubber Workers strike. During this time he was a member of the Tri-County Regional Planning Commission in Akron from 1964 to 1970.

== Political life ==
In 1970, Seiberling won the Democratic nomination for Ohio's 14th congressional district, based in Akron. Running on an anti-Vietnam War platform, he then defeated 10-term Republican William H. Ayres by 12 points in a major upset. He would be reelected seven more times from this district, He never faced substantive opposition in what became a solidly Democratic district. He won each of his seven reelection bids with over 70 percent of the vote. He did not run for reelection in 1986, and endorsed Akron Mayor Tom Sawyer as his successor. After his time in Congress, Seiberling served as faculty at the law school of the University of Akron from 1992 to 1996.

== Political legacy ==
He participated in the 1975 Congressional delegation meetings in the Middle East that helped precipitate the 1979 Israel-Egypt Peace Treaty. Seiberling is noted for helping effectively double the size of the United States National Park System via the 1980 Alaska Lands Act, adding approximately two-hundred million acres during his sixteen-year tenure in congress.

== Honors ==
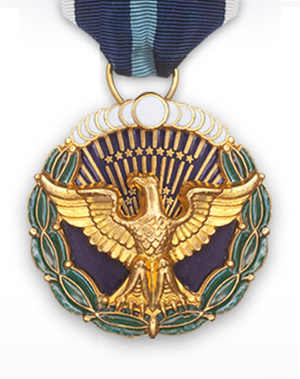
The Presidential Citizens Medal, was awarded to John Seiberling in 2001.

In 1986 the National Audubon Society awarded Seiberling the Audubon Medal. In 1988 the Garden Club of America awarded him the Frances K. Hutchinson Medal. On January 8, 2001, he was presented with the Presidential Citizens Medal by President Clinton. On Thursday, October 12, 2006, President George W. Bush signed into law H.R. 6051, which designates the Federal building and United States courthouse in Akron as the John F. Seiberling Federal Building and United States Courthouse. Seiberling's legacy is honored at 2370 Everett Road; a Covered bridge in Peninsula, Ohio. Known as the "Founding Father" of the Cuyahoga Valley National Park, Seiberling worked tirelessly during his sixteen-year tenure in congress to fulfill a childhood dream of establishing the Cuyahoga Valley as a protected part of the National Park System.

== Family life ==
He married Elizabeth "Betty" Behr, a Vassar graduate, in 1949. They had three sons: John B., David and Stephen. John Seiberling's cousin, Francis Seiberling, was also a U.S. Representative from Ohio (Republican). His mother, Henrietta Buckler Seiberling, was a seminal figure in Alcoholics Anonymous' founding and core spiritual ideals. His paternal grandfather was Frank Seiberling, founder of the Goodyear Tire and Rubber Company. The family's one-time home, Stan Hywet, is now a national museum.

== Death ==
Seiberling died of respiratory failure at his home in Copley, Ohio on August 2, 2008. His wife, Betty, died on May 23, 2017.

== Notes ==
U.S. House of Representatives
Preceded by William H. Ayres	United States Representative (14th district) from Ohio; 1971–1987	Succeeded by Thomas C. Sawyer
