= Daniel Hesidence =

American painter

- Born: Daniel Hesidence; October 14, 1975 (age 50); Akron, Ohio
- Known for: Painting
- Website: Danielhesidence

Daniel Hesidence (born October 14, 1975, in Akron, Ohio) is an American painter who lives and works in Long Island City, New York. Hesidence received his BFA from the University of Tampa, Florida in 1998, and completed his MFA at Hunter College, New York in 2001.

Hesidence's work ranges from representational to abstraction and has been featured in several important exhibitions including, Greater New York at PS1 Contemporary Art Center in New York and USA Today: New American Painting from the Saatchi Gallery at The Royal Academy in London. Selections from Hesidence's upcoming body of work titled Maritime Spring will be included in The Encyclopedic Palace at the 55th Venice Biennale curated by Massimiliano Gioni.

His most recent solo show at D'Amelio Gallery, where he exhibited a new series of works titled Autumn Buffalo, was critically praised by several publications, including Art in America., The New York Times., Time Out New York., and The New York Observer. His past solo shows in New York have garnered him similarly favorable reviews from both The New York Times. and Time Out New York.

Hesidence's recent exhibitions include: Le Tableau at Cheim & Read, New York; ROSE LAUGHTER Winter Holiday, curated by David Altmejd at Andrea Rosen Gallery, New York; and Cave Paintings: Installment #1, organized by Bob Nickas at Gresham's Ghost, New York.

His work can be found in major collections such as Charles Saatchi and the Museum of Contemporary Art Chicago.
