= Davey Tree Expert Company =

North American tree care company

The Davey Tree Expert Company
- Type: Employee owned
- Industry: Green Industry
- Founded: Kent, Ohio, United States; 1880 (origins); 1909 (incorporated)
- Founder: John Davey
- Headquarters: Kent, Ohio, United States
- Area served: United States, Canada, Panama
- Key people: Patrick M. Covey (CEO), Joseph R. Paul (CFO)
- Services: Arboriculture, Horticulture, Utility Vegetation Management, Environmental and Consulting Services
- Revenue: ▲US$1.841 billion (2024)
- Net income: ▼US$ 64,796,000 (2024)
- Owner: Employee owned (ESOP)
- Number of employees: 12,000
- Website: www.davey.com

The Davey Tree Expert Company, also known as Davey Tree, is a North American employee-owned corporation. The company's main services are research-driven tree services, grounds maintenance and environmental consulting services for residential, utility, and commercial and environmental partners in the United States and Canada. Davey has employees throughout the United States and Canada.

Davey is the oldest tree care company in North America, with origins dating back to 1880. John Davey, its founder, is considered the father of the science of tree surgery and the modern-day industry of arboriculture. It has been employee owned since 1979 and is the 9th largest such company in the U.S. Forbes named it as one of America's best employers in 2015, and U.S. News & World Report named it Best for Tree Care services in 2023.

Company headquarters are in Kent, Ohio. It provides services to homeowners, small and large businesses, public utilities, and local, state, and federal agencies through its arboriculture, horticulture, and environmental and consulting services.

== History ==
In 1873 at age 27, John Davey traveled from his native England to the United States, first to Castle Garden, New York, and later to Warren, Ohio, where he worked as a janitor. He moved to Kent, Ohio, in 1881 to take a job at Standing Rock Cemetery. The cemetery let him experiment with the property's trees, shrubs and flowers. He planted hundreds of trees along the Kent streets and around homes in the community and performed some tree work. He wanted people to care about trees, so he wrote a book on the topic. Davey's book was published in 1901 as The Tree Doctor.

John Davey was the company's president, and his son, Martin L. Davey, became the general manager and treasurer eight years later when The Davey Tree Expert Company was incorporated in 1909. By 1915, Davey Tree was growing and expanding: during the period from 1915 to 1920, the company expanded more than fivefold. Today, its sales are more than $1.8 billion.

Wolf Tree, a wholly owned Georgia subsidiary of Davey Tree, is implicated in the 2017 Murder of Eliud Montoya, involving corporate exploitation of illegal immigrant workers.

== Employee ownership ==
The Davey Tree Expert Company has been employee-owned since 1979 and is the 8th largest employee-owned company in the U.S., according to data from the National Center for Employee Ownership. (The 2025 Employee Ownership 100 list includes the nation's largest companies that are at least 50 percent owned by an employee stock ownership plan or other broad-based employee ownership plan.) The list also names Davey as the largest employee-owned company in Ohio.

== Environmental science ==
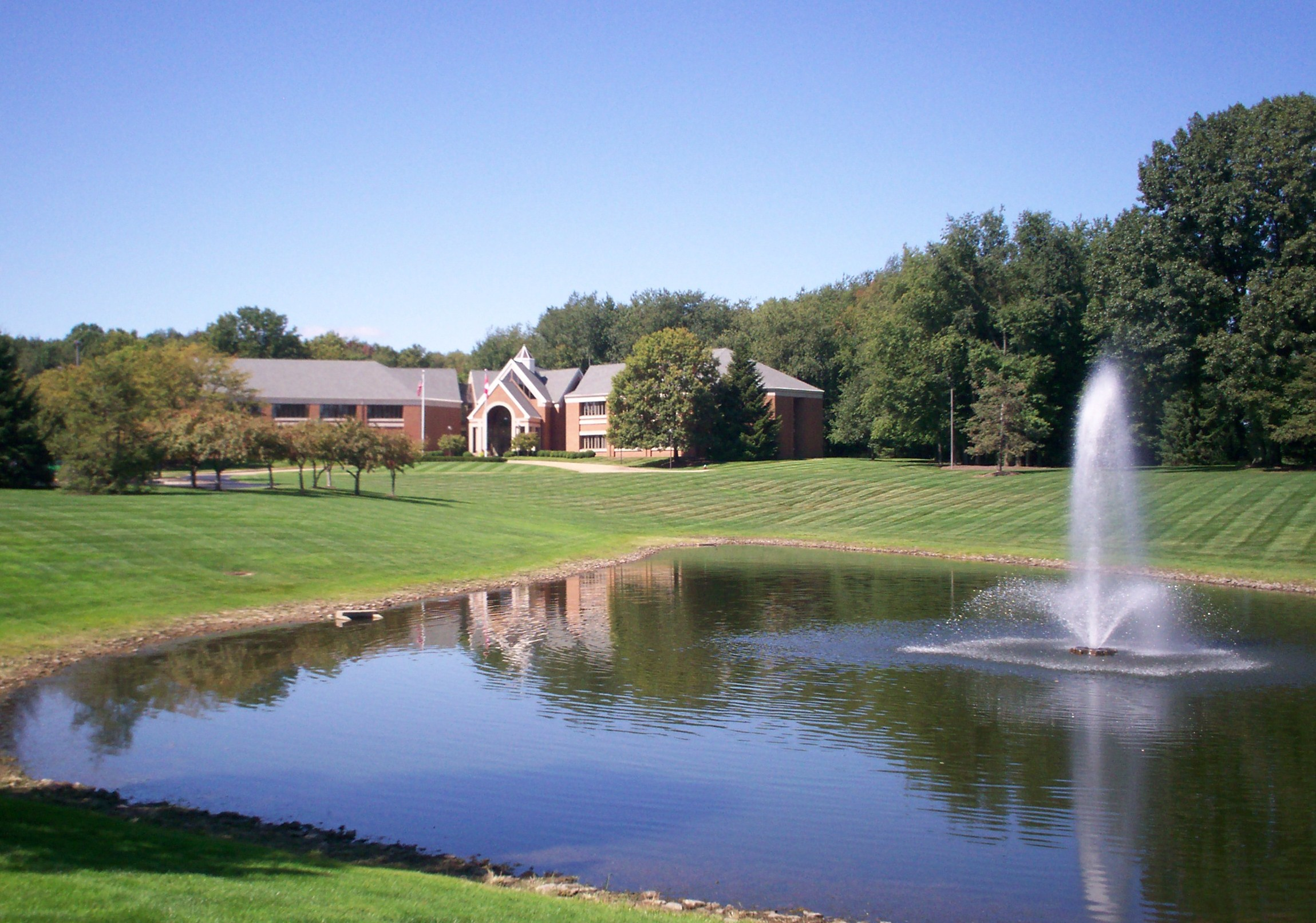
Corporate headquarters in Kent, Ohio

John Davey established the Davey Institute of Tree Surgery in 1908. A training facility was staffed by experts and also provided employees with the skills and tools needed to advance tree science. Today, the company still provides basic tree science as the educational foundation for its employees. According to the company, scientists and technical advisers guide field service teams in diagnosing and prescribing products, application procedure, and pest and disease cultural practices.

Davey built a new research and training facility, known as the Davey SEED (Science, Employee Education and Development) Campus, at its home headquarters in Kent, Ohio. The campus covers approximately 190 acres (77 ha) and will be used for a variety of research and training programs. Some areas it plans to research are water management and pollinator habitat, as well as ways to test how to build more sustainable landscapes as the world faces climate change.

The campus mainly occupies the former Oak Knolls East Golf Course, and Davey also made a deal with the Kent City School District to exchange the closed Franklin Elementary School, which was adjacent to the golf course property, for some other property adjacent to the district's middle and high school campus. Construction of the campus began in 2022 and was completed in 2025. The campus features a 25,000 square feet (2,300 m^{2}) training facility and a 10,700 square feet (990 m^{2}) indoor climbing center.

The company partners with other organizations to promote the benefits of trees, such as the Arbor Day Foundation, American Forests, International Society of Arboriculture and the Tree Care Industry Association and programs like the National Register of Big Trees and fundraisers like Tour des Trees. It also partners with universities such as Kent State.

In 2012, the company published its first corporate social responsibility report. The company has been involved in many projects to help care for the environment with initiatives such as i-Tree, software created by Davey and the USDA Forest Service used to quantify the benefit of trees, as well as helping the National Park Service care for the trees at the Flight 93 National Memorial. It also assists and helps clean up from natural disasters, such as Hurricane Rita and Hurricane Katrina. Hurricane Katrina created widespread tree damage prompting the International Society of Arboriculture, Davey Tree, and Urban Forest Strike Teams to deploy certified arborists into at least nine communities along the Mississippi/Louisiana Gulf Coast. Throughout September and October 2017, thousands of federal, state, and private agencies were deployed to areas that were impacted by hurricanes Harvey, Irma, Maria, and Nate. These first responders are there to help the people in the storm's path. However, Davey is part of another group of responders who go into storm-ravaged towns to aid the trees.

Davey employees aided in record numbers in response to Hurricane Helene, which made landfall near Perry, Florida, on September 26, 2024, with sustained winds of 140 mph (230 km/h). The storm made its way up through Georgia and the Carolinas. Just shy of two weeks later, Hurricane Milton hit near Siesta Key, Florida, with 120 mph (190 km/h) winds. Upwards of 1,600 Eastern Utility, 315 Davey Resource Group, 215 Residential/Commercial services, 172 Davey Tree Surgery Company, 15 Davey Tree Expert Co. of Canada, Limited, a dozen Commercial Landscape Services, as well as motor carrier and safety support staff employees, responded to Helene and Milton's cleanup efforts – a total of more than 2,300 Davey employees in all.

== Service divisions ==
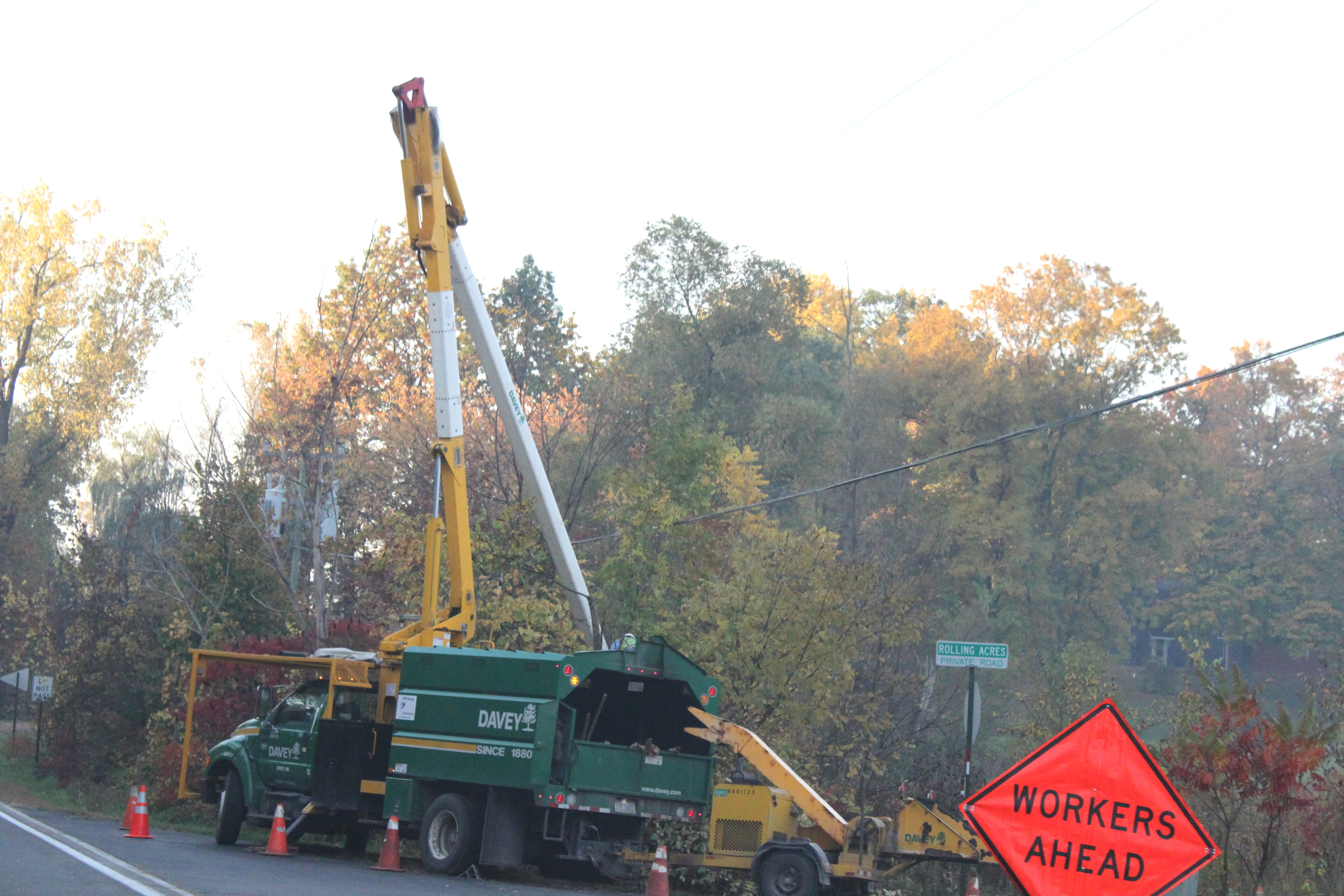
Davey tree trimming operation Superior Township, Michigan

The company operates in two segments, residential/commercial, and utility. It has research, technical support, and laboratory diagnostic facilities. The residential/commercial segment is involved in the treatment, preservation, maintenance, removal, and planting of trees, shrubs, and other plant life. The segment's services also include landscaping, grounds maintenance, tree surgery, as well as the application of fertilizers, herbicides, and insecticides. The utility services segment engages vegetation management around power lines, rights-of-way, and chemical brush control services; and natural resource management and consulting, forestry research and development, and environmental planning services.

About half the company growth in this century has come from mergers and acquisitions, the largest being Illinois-based The Care of Trees in 2008. Davey Tree has also purchased VanCuren Services, Inc. and Midwest Land Clearing, Inc. in 2024, Mickman Brothers, Inc. in 2023, Restoration Systems LLC in 2022, and TGC Engineering in 2020.
