= William Hanes Ayres =

American politician (1916–2000)

William Ayres
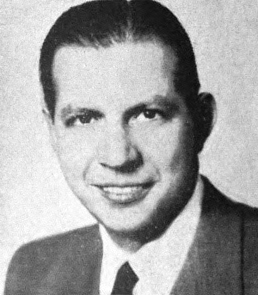

Member of the U.S. House of Representatives from Ohio's 14th district
- In office January 3, 1951 – January 3, 1971
- Preceded by: Walter B. Huber
- Succeeded by: John F. Seiberling

Personal details
- Born: William Hanes Ayres; February 5, 1916 Eagle Rock, Virginia, U.S.
- Died: December 27, 2000 (aged 84) Columbia, Maryland, U.S.
- Resting place: Arlington National Cemetery
- Party: Republican
- Spouse: Mary Helen Coventry
- Children: 3
- Education: Western Reserve University

Military service
- Allegiance: United States
- Branch/service: United States Army
- Years of service: 1944–1945
- Rank: Private
- Battles/wars: World War II

William Hanes Ayres (February 5, 1916 – December 27, 2000) was an American World War II veteran and politician who served as a Republican member of the U.S. House of Representatives from Ohio from 1951 to 1971.

== Early life and career ==
William H. Ayres was born in Eagle Rock, Virginia. He moved with his parents to West Virginia and later to Lorain County, Ohio. He attended the Weller Township High School, and graduated from Western Reserve University in Cleveland, Ohio, in 1936. He worked as a salesman for heating equipment in Akron, Ohio, from 1936 to 1944.

He was president of the Ayres Heating & Insulation Co., Akron, Ohio, since 1946.

=== World War II ===
During the Second World War he served as a private in the United States Army until being discharged December 17, 1945.

== Congress ==
Ayres was elected as a Republican to the Eighty-second and to the nine succeeding Congresses. Ayres was well regarded by House members of both parties. He usually did not list his party affiliation on his campaign literature instead listing himself as "Your Congressman."

He was an unsuccessful candidate for reelection in 1970 to the Ninety-second Congress defeated by John Seiberling, an Akron Democrat and scion.

=== Civil rights ===
Ayres voted in favor of the Civil Rights Acts of 1957, 1960, 1964, and 1968, and the Voting Rights Act of 1965, as well as being one of six Ohio Republicans in the House of Representatives to support Medicare.

== Death and family legacy ==
He died of heart and kidney ailments on December 27, 2000, in Columbia, Maryland. Interment at Arlington National Cemetery.

Representative Ayres's wife of 61 years, Mary Helen Coventry Ayres, died in 1999.

He had two daughters, Virginia Mount Ayres of Alexandria, Virginia, and Judith Elizabeth Ayres Burke of Middleburg, Virginia. A son, Frank Hanes Ayres, died in 1991.

U.S. House of Representatives
Preceded by Walter B. Huber	Member of the U.S. House of Representatives from Ohio's 14th congressional district 1951–1971	Succeeded by John F. Seiberling
