= Dow W. Harter =

American politician (1885–1971)

Dow Watters Harter
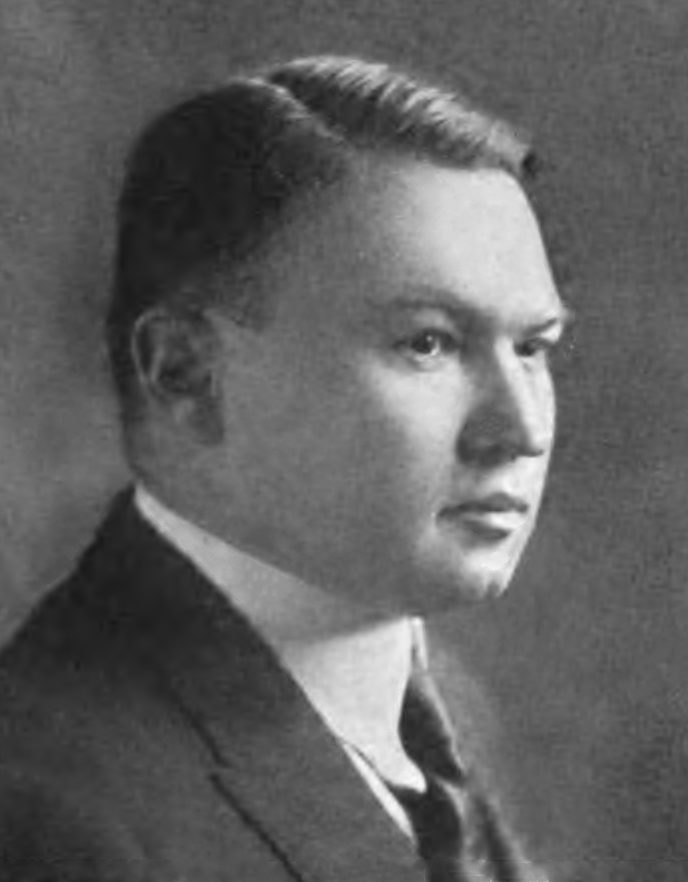

Member of the U.S. House of Representatives from Ohio's 14th district
- In office March 4, 1933 – January 3, 1943
- Preceded by: Francis Seiberling
- Succeeded by: Edmund Rowe

Member of the Ohio House of Representatives
- In office 1919–1920

Personal details
- Born: January 2, 1885 Akron, Ohio, U.S.
- Died: September 4, 1971 (aged 86) Washington, D.C., U.S.
- Resting place: Rock Creek Cemetery; Washington, D.C., U.S.
- Party: Democratic
- Education: University of Michigan; University of Michigan Law School

Dow Watters Harter (January 2, 1885 – September 4, 1971) was a U.S. representative from Ohio.

Born in Akron, Ohio, Harter attended the Akron public schools. He received preparatory education at the University of Michigan at Ann Arbor and graduated from the law department of the same university in 1907. He was admitted to the Michigan and Ohio bars in 1907. He commenced practice in Akron, in 1911. First assistant prosecuting attorney of Summit County, Ohio from 1914 to 1916. He served as member of the State house of representatives in 1919 and 1920. In 1920 he was named as a charter member and first president of the Akron Host Lions Club. United States commissioner at Akron from 1918 to 1926.

Harter was elected as a Democrat to the Seventy-third and to the four succeeding Congresses (March 4, 1933 – January 3, 1943). He was an unsuccessful candidate for reelection in 1942 to the Seventy-eighth Congress. He was admitted to practice of law in the District of Columbia in 1943 and was a partner in a law firm there until his retirement in 1965. He died in Washington, D.C., September 4, 1971. He was interred in Rock Creek Cemetery.

== Sources ==
- United States Congress. "Dow W. Harter (id: H000294)". Biographical Directory of the United States Congress.
- Media related to Dow W. Harter at Wikimedia Commons

U.S. House of Representatives
| Preceded by Francis Seiberling | Member of the U.S. House of Representatives from Ohio's 14th congressional district 1933–1943 | Succeeded by Edmund Rowe |
