= Kim Zurz =

American politician

Kimberly Zurz
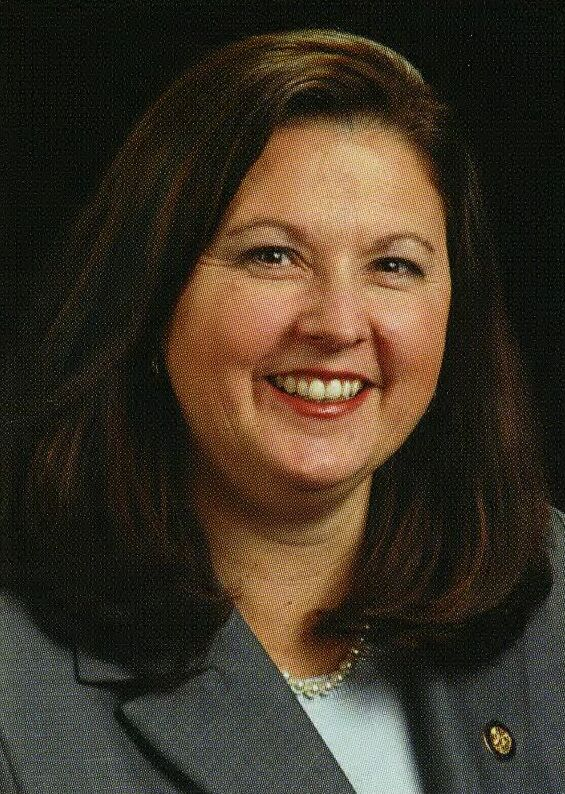

Member of the Ohio Senate from the 28th district
- In office September 3, 2003 – January 28, 2007
- Preceded by: Leigh Herington
- Succeeded by: Thomas C. Sawyer

Personal details
- Born: January 23, 1959 (age 67)
- Party: Democratic

Kimberly A. Zurz (born January 23, 1959) of Akron, Ohio, is an American politician of the Democratic Party who served as the director of the Ohio Department of Commerce from 2007 to 2011.

== Career ==
A graduate of Firestone High School in Akron and attendee of the University of Akron, Zurz served as an assistant to the Summit County treasurer. She was a member of the Summit County Council from 1991 to 2003, serving three terms as president of the council.

In 2003, Senator Leigh Herington announced his decision to resign early from the Ohio Senate, and the Democratic caucus named Zurz as his replacement. She easily won reelection in 2004 to retain the seat.

With former Congressman Ted Strickland the new Ohio Governor in 2007, Zurz was named a member of his cabinet, chosen to serve as director of the Department of Commerce. She would serve in the post for the entirety of Strickland's tenure. With Strickland losing reelection in 2010, Zurz was out of the Commerce Department, however, he posted one last effort to appoint her to another board. It was announced by the Ohio Senate soon after that Republican leadership would not accept the nomination.

She has since returned to the Akron area.

== See also ==
- Politics of Ohio
