= Edmund Rowe =

American politician

Member of the U.S. House of Representatives from Ohio's 14th district
- In office January 3, 1943 – January 3, 1945
- Preceded by: Dow W. Harter
- Succeeded by: Walter B. Huber

Member of the Ohio General Assembly
- In office 1955–1959

Personal details
- Born: December 21, 1892 Sherrodsville, Ohio
- Died: October 4, 1972 (aged 79) Akron, Ohio
- Resting place: Glendale Cemetery
- Party: Republican

Edmund Rowe (December 21, 1892 – October 4, 1972) was an American businessman, World War I veteran and politician who served one term as a U.S. representative from Ohio from 1943 to 1945.

== Biography ==
Born in Sherrodsville, Ohio, Rowe attended the public schools. He worked in the coal mines from 1905 to 1909, in the rubber industry 1909–1913, and at the machinist trade from 1913 to 1916.

=== World War I ===
During the First World War served in the United States Navy from 1917 to 1919.

=== Business career ===
He was owner of a bowling academy from 1919 to 1929. He engaged in the real estate business in 1920 and the insurance business in 1928. Organizer of the Rowe Oil & Chemical Co. in 1936. He served as member of the city council of Akron, Ohio from 1928 to 1942, serving one term as president.

=== Congress ===
Rowe was elected as a Republican to the Seventy-eighth Congress (January 3, 1943 – January 3, 1945). He was an unsuccessful candidate for reelection in 1944 to the Seventy-ninth Congress and for election in 1948 to the Eighty-first Congress.

=== Later career ===
He served as member of the Ohio General Assembly from 1955 to 1959. He was an unsuccessful candidate for mayor of Akron in 1957. Real estate broker.

=== Death and burial ===
Resided in Akron, Ohio, where he died October 4, 1972. He was interred in Glendale Cemetery.

== Sources ==
- United States Congress. "Edmund Rowe (id: R000475)". Biographical Directory of the United States Congress.

U.S. House of Representatives
Preceded by Dow W. Harter	Member of the U.S. House of Representatives from Ohio's 14th congressional district 1943–1945	Succeeded by Walter B. Huber
