= Francis Seiberling =

American politician

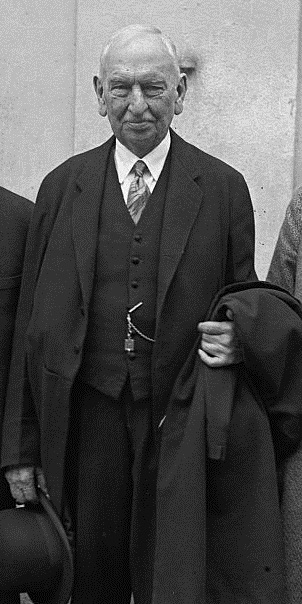

Member of the U.S. House of Representatives from Ohio's 14th district
- In office March 4, 1929 – March 3, 1933
- Preceded by: Martin L. Davey
- Succeeded by: Dow W. Harter

Personal details
- Born: September 20, 1870 Des Moines, Iowa
- Died: February 1, 1945 (aged 74) Akron, Ohio
- Resting place: Rose Hill Cemetery, Akron
- Party: Republican
- Education: Wittenberg College; College of Wooster

Francis Seiberling (September 20, 1870 – February 1, 1945) was an American lawyer and politician who served two terms as a U.S. representative from Ohio from 1929 to 1933. He was a cousin of John F. Seiberling.

== Biography ==
Born in Des Moines, Iowa, Seiberling moved with his parents to Wadsworth, Ohio, in 1873. He attended the public schools and Wittenberg College, Springfield, Ohio, and was graduated from the College of Wooster, (Ohio) in 1892. He studied law. He was admitted to the bar in 1894 and commenced practice in Akron, Ohio. He was also interested in the manufacture of rubber and tires and served as a director in various manufacturing companies. He served as a trustee of Wittenberg College.

=== Congress ===
Seiberling was elected as a Republican to the Seventy-first and Seventy-second Congresses (March 4, 1929 – March 3, 1933). He was an unsuccessful candidate for reelection in 1932 to the Seventy-third Congress.

=== Later career and death ===
He resumed the practice of law.

He died in Akron, Ohio, February 1, 1945. He was interred in Rose Hill Cemetery.

== Sources ==
- United States Congress. "Francis Seiberling (id: S000229)". Biographical Directory of the United States Congress.

U.S. House of Representatives
| Preceded by Martin L. Davey | Member of the U.S. House of Representatives from Ohio's 14th congressional district 1929–1933 | Succeeded by Dow W. Harter |
