= Tom Watkins (politician) =

American politician

Member of the Ohio House of Representatives from the 44th district
- In office January 3, 1985 – December 31, 1992
- Preceded by: Thomas C. Sawyer
- Succeeded by: Karen Doty

Personal details
- Party: Republican

Tom Watkins is a former member of the Ohio House of Representatives.
