= Billy C. Hawkins =

American academic administrator

20th President of Texas College
- In office 2000–2007

20th President of Talladega College
- In office January 1, 2008 – June 30, 2022

Personal details
- Born: William C. Hawkins Kent, Ohio, U.S.
- Education: Ferris State University; Central Michigan University
- Alma mater: Michigan State University
- Occupation: Academic administrator

Billy C. Hawkins is an American academic administrator, and teacher. He served as a past president of Talladega College. Hawkins also serves as a board member of the United Negro College Fund and is a past member of the White House Board of Advisors on historically black colleges and universities.

== Early life and education ==
William C. Hawkins was born and raised in Kent, Ohio, and graduated from Theodore Roosevelt High School in 1972. He completed his Bachelor of Science in teacher education from Ferris State University, followed by a master's degree in education administration from Central Michigan University. Hawkins earned his PhD from Michigan State University, followed by post-doctoral work at Harvard University.

== Career ==
Hawkins first job in education was as a teacher in Lansing, Michigan. He entered a career in higher education administration as provost and vice president of academic affairs and a professor at Mississippi Valley State University. He proceeded to work in academic and leadership positions at Saint Paul's College, Ferris State University, and Morrisville State College.

From 2000 to 2007 he was president of Texas College. While at Texas College, Hawkins regained the college's accreditation and increased enrollment by 82 percent.

=== Talladega College ===
On January 1, 2008, he became the 20th president of Talladega College. During his time at Talladega, Hawkins sought to bring the college out of debt and increase enrollment. He began partnering with companies based in Talldega, including Honda, and the state of Alabama's work release program, to secure volunteers and staff to help maintain and care for the college grounds. The project included renovations of every campus building - the first in twelve years. Hawkins also relaunched the school's sports programs after ten years. The college has won seven national championships since Hawkins relaunched athletics. He also helped the school regain its accreditation from the Southern Association of Colleges and Schools and created the Dr. William R. Harvey Museum of Art.

In 2017, the Talladega College band performed at the inauguration of Donald Trump. Funds for the performance were crowdsourced, including support from Bill O'Reilly. Hawkins experienced a backlash, including calls to be fired, however, student band members and the board of trustees supported the performance.

Hawkins serves as a board member of the United Negro College Fund and is a member of the White House Board of Advisors on Historically Black Colleges and Universities (HBCU). In 2020, he was named one of the 10 most powerful HBCU leaders in the US by the HBCU Campaign Fund. He retired on June 30, 2022.

== Personal life ==
Hawkins is a member of Omega Psi Phi.

== Works ==
- Hawkins, B. C. (1994). Educating all students: A pathway to success. Lansing, MI: Shinsky Seminars.
