= Riley Larkin =

American football coach (born 1996)

New England Patriots
- Title: Assistant quarterbacks coach

Personal information
- Born: December 4, 1996 (age 29); Kent, Ohio, U.S.

Career information
- Position: Quarterback
- High school: Theodore Roosevelt (OH)
- College: John Carroll University (2015–2018)

Career history
- McLean High School (2019–2020) Quarterbacks coach; Ravenwood High School (2021) Quarterbacks coach; Middle Tennessee (2022) Offensive analyst; Ohio State (2023–2024) Assistant quarterbacks coach; New England Patriots (2025–present) Assistant quarterbacks coach

Awards and highlights
- CFP national champion (2024)

Riley Larkin is an American football coach who serves as an offensive assistant for the New England Patriots of the National Football League (NFL). He joined the Patriots in 2025 after spending two seasons on the coaching staff at Ohio State, including a role as assistant quarterbacks coach.

== Personal life ==
Riley Larkin was born December 4, 1996, in Kent, Ohio, and is the son of Tom and Amy Larkin. He is a 2015 graduate of Roosevelt High School in Kent and a 2019 graduate of John Carroll University in University Heights, Ohio, with a bachelor's degree in adolescent young adult education and social studies. Larkin has also served as a Special Olympics coach and volunteer.

== College football career ==
After his high school graduation, Larkin committed to playing for the John Carroll Blue Streaks. Larkin, who was a quarterback, did not appear in any games in his freshman season. He made his collegiate debut On October 1, 2016, against Wilmington where he threw for 4 completions, 49 yards and 1 touchdown. In his junior year, Larkin appeared in 5 games, throwing 17 completions, 237 yards and 2 touchdowns as well as 3 interceptions. He scored his first rushing touchdown in 2018 during his senior year, a 69-yard rushing touchdown against Wilmington, finishing the year with 468 yards of total offense and 5 total touchdowns.

== Coaching career ==
=== Early coaching career ===
Larkin began his coaching career in 2019, where he served as a quarterbacks coach for McLean High School in Virginia from 2019 until 2020, at McLean, he totaled a record of 9–8. Larkin coached Ravenwood High School in Tennessee in 2021, as a quarterbacks coach, helping them finished with a 10–3 record and a TSSAA state quarterfinals appearance.

=== Middle Tennessee State ===
Larkin joined Rick Stockshill's staff in 2022, as an offensive analyst. The Blue Raiders finished with an 8–5 record and won the Bahamas Bowl in that season.

=== Ohio State ===
Larkin joined the Ohio State Buckeyes staff in 2023 as an offensive assistant under head coach Ryan Day. In his first year with the Buckeyes, they finished with an 11–2 record, a Cotton Bowl win and a AP Top 10 finish. Larkin was promoted to assistant quarterbacks coach for the 2024 season, coaching the likes of Will Howard. Larkin helped the Buckeyes achieve a 14–2 record and a national championship win over Notre Dame.

=== New England Patriots ===
In 2025, the New England Patriots hired Larkin as an assistant quarterback's coach, coaching the likes of Drake Maye. Larkin helped the Patriots achieve a 14–3 record, as well as a Super Bowl appearance. The Patriots lost to the Seattle Seahawks 29–13, with Maye throwing for 295 yards, 2 touchdowns and two interceptions.
