= Deral Boykin =

American football player (born 1970)

No. 21, 25
- Position: Defensive back

Personal information
- Born: September 2, 1970 (age 56); Kent, Ohio, U.S.
- Listed height: 5 ft 11 in (1.80 m)
- Listed weight: 198 lb (90 kg)

Career information
- High school: Theodore Roosevelt (Kent)
- College: Louisville
- NFL draft: 1993: 6th round, 149th overall pick

Career history
- Los Angeles Rams (1993); Washington Redskins (1994); Jacksonville Jaguars (1995); Philadelphia Eagles (1996)

Career NFL statistics
- Tackles: 23
- Fumble recoveries: 2
- Touchdowns: 1
- Stats at Pro Football Reference

Deral Lamont Boykin (born September 2, 1970) is an American former professional football player who was a safety in the National Football League (NFL) for the Los Angeles Rams, Washington Redskins, Philadelphia Eagles, and Jacksonville Jaguars. He played college football for the Louisville Cardinals and was selected in the sixth round of the 1993 NFL draft.
