= Herman H. Long =

American college administrator

- Born: May 2, 1912; Birmingham, Alabama, U.S.
- Died: August 8, 1976 (aged 64)
- Education: Talladega College; University of Michigan

Herman Hodge Long (May 2, 1912 – August 8, 1976) was an American college administrator and author of several pioneering studies dealing with race relations. He served as president of his alma mater, Alabama's Talladega College, from 1965 to 1976, while concurrently serving as president of the United Negro College Fund from 1970 to 1975.

== Educational achievements ==
An Alabama native, Herman Long was born in the state's largest city, Birmingham, and moved with his family to Chicago's South Side, where he grew up in poverty. Working at numerous jobs, he studied at night and, as even worse times loomed in the aftermath of the October 1929 stock market crash, was determined to achieve the highest level of education. In September 1931 he returned to Alabama to attend Talladega College, the state's oldest, private, historically black liberal arts college, founded in 1867 on the outskirts of Talladega County's seat, the city of Talladega. During the four years spent there as a student, he was considered a top debater and, at 6 ft 3 in (191 cm), became a star player and, eventually, captain of the basketball team. He also participated in the college's other athletic programs, whether as a member of the track team or taking part in baseball and football competitions. Until his graduation, cum laude, in 1935, he continued to work at any available jobs, including acting as a barber for his fellow students. A psychology major, he went on to earn his M.A. at the Hartford Seminary's School of Religious Education and his Ph.D. at the University of Michigan.

In the preparation for his doctoral dissertation in 1940–41, Long became associated with one of the leading African-American social scientists of the period, Charles S. Johnson, the head of sociology at Nashville's renowned historically black institution, Fisk University, which chose Johnson, in 1947, as its first African-American president. Along with two other research supervisors, Long provided the parish background reports for Johnson's influential Louisiana study (published in spring 1942) of race relations, on the eve of World War II, in twenty of the state's sixty-four parishes.

After receiving his Ph.D., Long returned to Fisk at Johnson's invitation, becoming the head of the university's Human Relations Institute of the American Missionary Association. In this capacity, he traveled around the country, researching race relations and serving as a consultant regarding programs centered at improving relations and ameliorating strained and problematic conditions. His 1949 study of racially discriminatory housing covenants received favorable notice and was quoted in a number of sociological texts.

== President of Talladega College and the United Negro College Fund ==
In 1964, Talladega College's Board of Trustees completed a lengthy search for a successor to the institution's first African-American president, Arthur Gray, who served from 1952 to 1962, by offering the position to its distinguished alumnus, Herman Long. His 1965 inauguration at the college's DeForest Chapel took place thirty years after his own graduation ceremony there. As a highly regarded figure in the African-American community, he continued to provide leadership during the turbulent 1960s and, in 1970, while continuing to serve in his Talladega post, was chosen as the next president of the United Negro College Fund (UNCF), the organization, then in its 26th year (founded in 1944), which has as its goal the raising of funds for the 39 private historically black colleges and universities. Shortly after assuming his new position, he was interviewed in the New York studio of NBC's Today Show, and discussed his and the Fund's goals and projects. It was during his tenure, in 1972, that the slogan, "A Mind Is a Terrible Thing to Waste", became the UNCF's motto.

Herman H. Long was 64 when he died of cancer at Talladega's Citizens Hospital. He was survived by his wife, Henrietta Shivery and daughter, Ellen. Buell Gallagher, president emeritus of New York's City College who, four decades earlier, from 1933 to 1943, himself served as Talladega College president, a period which included the junior and senior years future president Long spent as a student, said in memoriam, "Herman Long's studies were very powerful forces working for the integration of the races when the possibility of such integration was very slight. He was an important and imaginative figure before the actual transition phase of race relations in this country."
