= William R. Harvey =

American educator

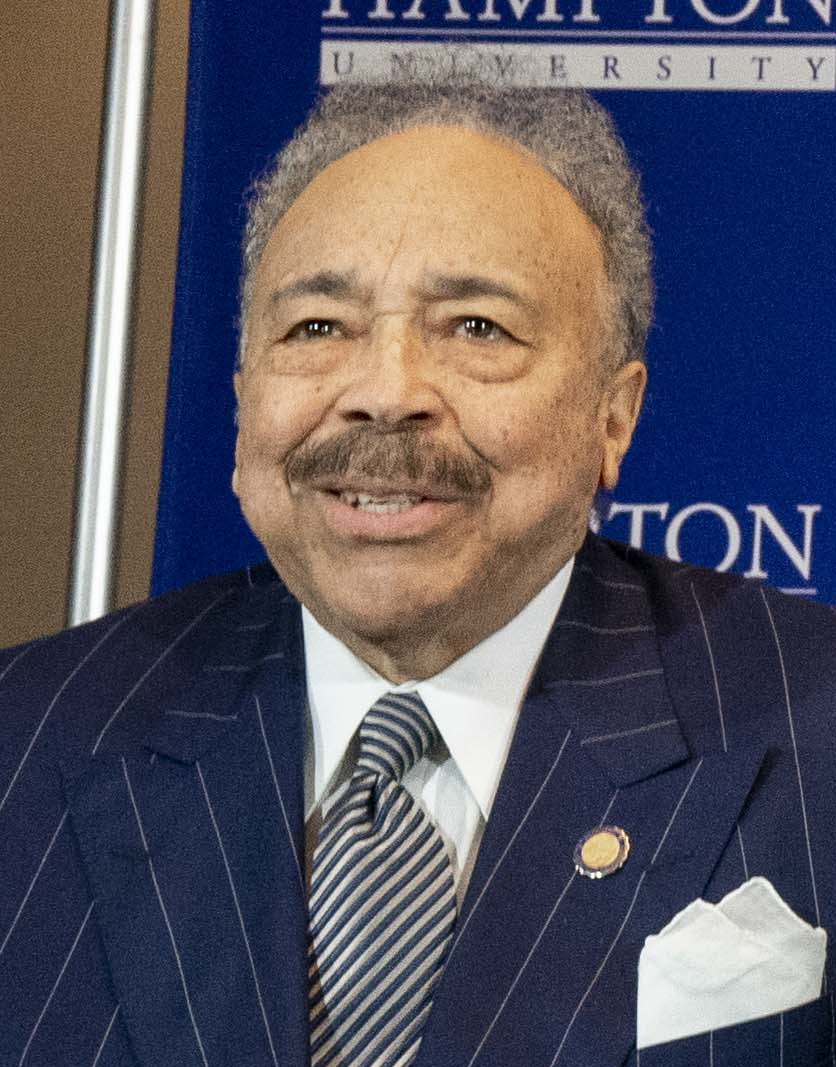
- Harvey in 2020

12th President of Hampton University
- In office July 1, 1978 – June 30, 2022
- Preceded by: Carl McClellan Hill
- Succeeded by: Darrell K. Williams

Personal details
- Born: William Robert Harvey; January 29, 1941 (age 85) Brewton, Alabama, U.S.
- Spouse: Norma Baker
- Children: 3
- Education: Talladega College; Virginia State University; Harvard University

William Robert Harvey (born January 29, 1941, Brewton, Alabama) is an American educator, academic administrator, and businessman who served as president of Hampton University from 1978 to 2022. He is the longest serving president in the school's history. Harvey became the first African-American owner in the soft drink bottling industry when he and his wife, Norma Baker Harvey, purchased a Pepsi-Cola Bottling Company franchise together in 1986.

On December 15, 2020, He announced his plans to retire as President of Hampton University by June 2022. He officially retired on June 30, 2022, after serving nearly 44 consecutive years as president.

== See also ==
- Dr. William R. Harvey Museum of Art
