= Theodore Roosevelt High School (Kent, Ohio) =

Location
- 1400 North Mantua Street; Kent, Ohio 44240; United States; 41°10′7.97″N 81°21′22.15″W

Information
- Type: Public
- Founded: 1868
- School district: Kent City School District
- CEEB code: 362778
- NCES School ID: 390441601086
- Principal: Dennis Love
- Faculty: 67 (2024–25)
- Grades: 9–12
- Enrollment: 1,325 (2024–25)
- Student to teacher ratio: 19.78
- Language: English
- Campus size: 90.5 acres (36.6 ha)
- Campus type: Suburban
- Colors: Red, white, black
- Athletics conference: Metro Athletic Conference
- Team name: Rough Riders
- Rivals: Ravenna Ravens; Stow–Munroe Falls Bulldogs
- Accreditation: Ohio Department of Education
- Publication: The Colonel (magazine)
- Yearbook: Rough Rider
- Communities served: Kent, Brady Lake, Franklin Township, Sugar Bush Knolls
- Distinctions: Presidential Excellence in Education: 1985; U.S. News & World Report 'Best High Schools' Bronze Medal ranking: 2010, 2015, 2016, 2018
- Website: www.kentschools.net/o/trhs
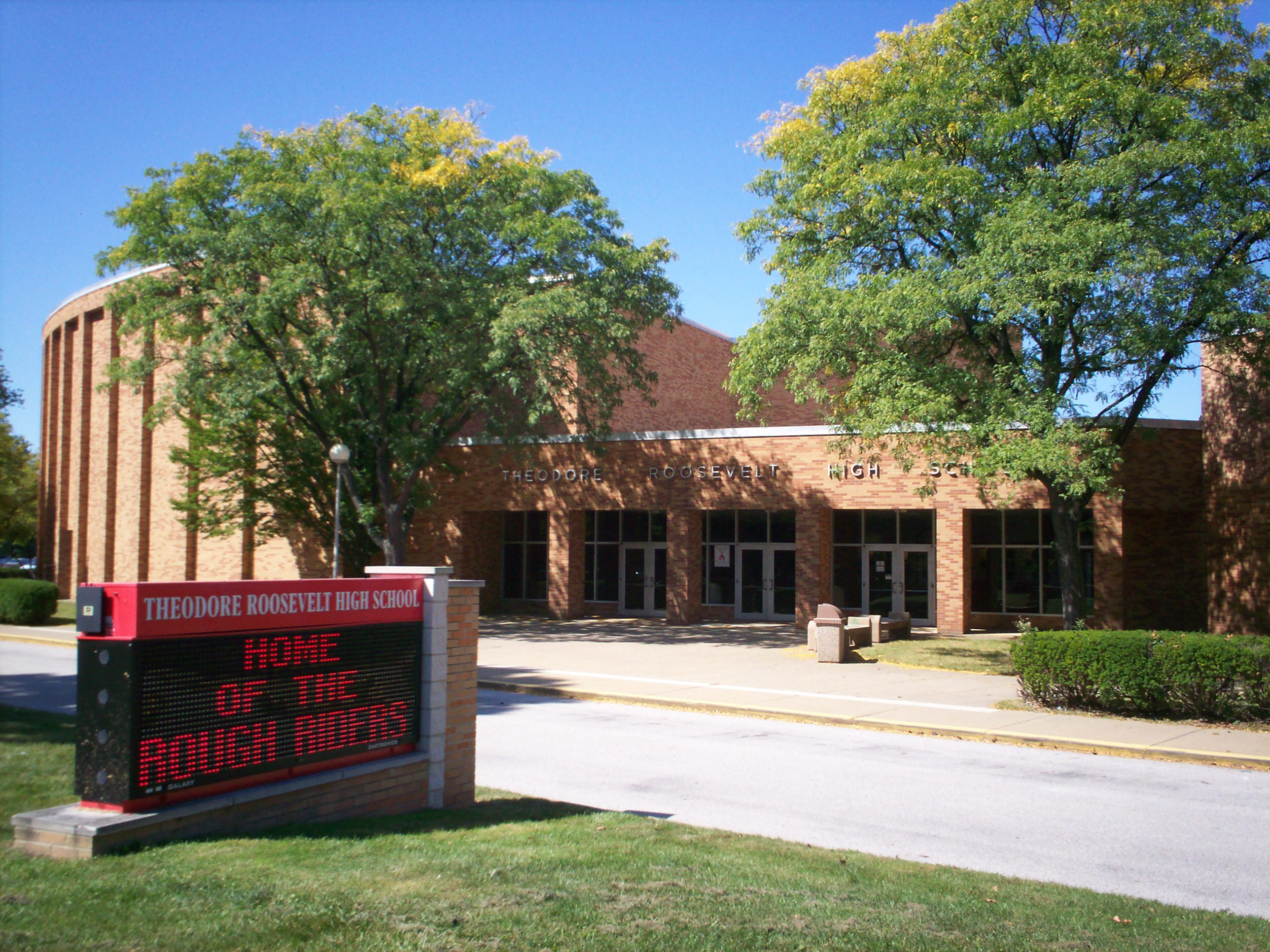
- Front view seen from State Route 43

Theodore Roosevelt High School (RHS or TRHS), often referred to as Kent Roosevelt (KRHS), is a public high school in Kent, Ohio, United States. It is the only high school in Kent and the Kent City School District and serves students in grades 9–12 living in Kent, Franklin Township, Brady Lake, and Sugar Bush Knolls as well as a small portion of southern Streetsboro. As of the 2024–25 academic year, enrollment was 1,325 students with 67 teachers for a student–teacher ratio of 19.78. Recognition for academic performance over the years has come from the United States Department of Education, Ohio Department of Education, and U.S. News & World Report.

The school was founded in 1868 as Kent High School and was first housed at the Franklin Township Hall until the completion of the Union School building in March 1869. In 1922, the school was moved to a new facility named for U.S. President Theodore Roosevelt on a 10-acre (4.0 ha) campus, which would serve as the high school until 1959. Following completion of a new building on a larger 31-acre (13 ha) campus along North Mantua Street in northern Kent, Roosevelt was moved to this location. The building has had a number of additions made beginning in the mid-1960s and contains nearly 70 classrooms, a library, two gymnasiums, auditorium, and indoor pool. The campus has been expanded over the years to 90.5 acres (36.6 ha) and also includes several athletic facilities and practice fields, and Stanton Middle School.

Nearly 200 courses are offered at the school including 13 Advanced Placement classes and 25 vocational education programs. Roosevelt is part of the Six District Educational Compact which pools vocational resources with five nearby high schools. There are also two academy programs for students with various educational needs. Other elective courses offered include lifeguard training, various aspects of American history and culture, multiple writing and journalism courses, and the visual, performing, and practical arts. There are multiple co- and extracurricular clubs and activities, many of which have earned outside recognition at the state and national levels. Roosevelt athletic teams are known as the Rough Riders with school colors of red, white, and black, and compete in the Metro Athletic Conference as part of the Ohio High School Athletic Association. Notable Roosevelt alumni include a Governor of Ohio, professional athletes, and entertainment figures.

== History ==
The Union School building, later known as Central School

The establishment of what is today Theodore Roosevelt High School occurred in 1868 when the first classes of what was originally known as Kent High School were held. This was preceded first by the formation of the Franklin Union School District around 1860, which brought four smaller schoolhouse districts under one administration in what was then known as Franklin Mills. In 1867, the school board decided to consolidate the various neighborhood schoolhouses and create a graded curriculum, which included separate high school classes. As part of the consolidation effort, construction of a new building, known as the Union School, began at the corner of Park Avenue and North Mantua Street on a hill overlooking the newly named village of Kent. Construction of the school was part of a number of building developments in Kent in the late 1860s, including two churches and a large bank building. The name of the settlement was changed from Franklin Mills to Kent in 1864 and the village was incorporated from part of Franklin Township in early May 1867 after population growth began in the mid-1860s following the arrival of the Atlantic and Great Western Railroad and its shops in 1863. The laying of the Union School's cornerstone on May 29, 1867, was hailed by the local newspaper, the Kent Bulletin, as an event "which is brighter than anything heretofore recorded in our favor."

Because of construction delays, the building was not ready for classes in September 1868, so the first classes of the high school were held at the nearby Franklin Township Hall while students in grades 1–8 remained at their old schoolhouses. The new building opened on March 14, 1869 with the high school grades located in the southwest room of the second floor and the four primary grades on the first floor. The third floor of the building was an open, multi-purpose room. The school held its first graduation ceremony in July 1869 with a class of just one, a student named Anna Nutting. Nutting later taught at the Union School and eventually became its principal, serving until 1888. The Union School, which would later be known as Central School, served as the home of all Kent students until two additional elementary schools for grades 1–6 were constructed in the 1880s. For most of the 1910s, all of the school buildings were overcrowded and the high school graduating classes had grown to nearly 40 students. As a result, a new, separate high school building was built in 1922. The Union/Central building remained in service mainly for grades K–7 until December 1952, when it was closed after the completion of the first phase of a new Central Elementary School on the same property. It was razed in 1953 to make way for the second phase of the new Central, which opened in 1954. Because of Kent High School's location in what became known as the Central School by the late 19th century, the school is often referred to contemporarily and historically as Kent Central High or simply as Central High.

=== North Prospect campus ===
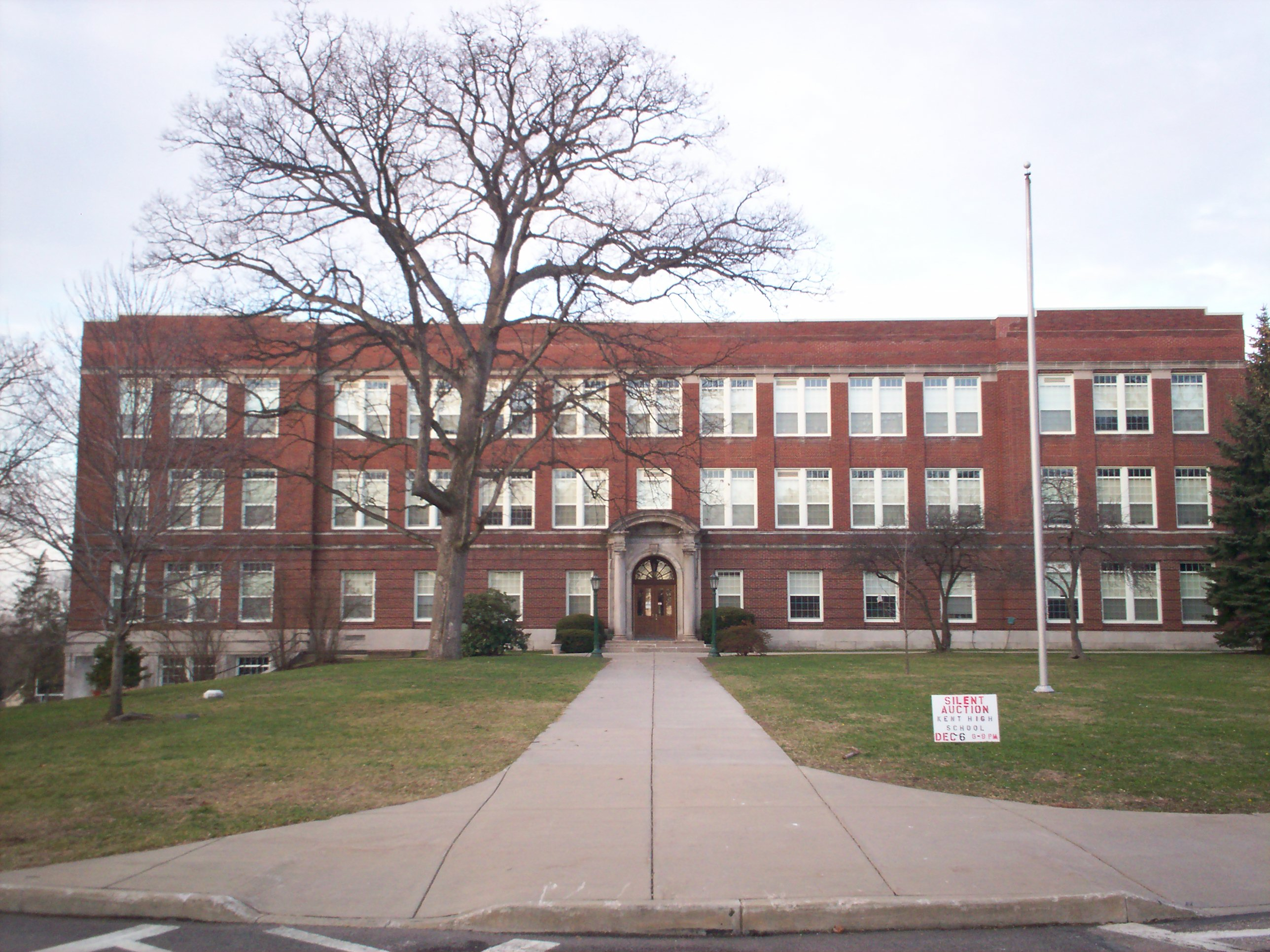
The first building to bear the name of Theodore Roosevelt now serves as Davey Elementary School.

Increases in enrollment throughout the 1910s led the school board to request funds to build a new high school building along with additions to other district buildings to ease overcrowding and prepare for expected growth in enrollment. A bond issue for the various construction projects was approved by voters June 24, 1919. Initially, the school board had planned to build the school on property along South Water Street adjacent to downtown, but decided against this citing the need for a larger lot and building to accommodate expected growth. Eventually, a 10-acre (4.0 ha) site at the intersection of Park Avenue and North Prospect Street was purchased and construction began May 31, 1921. It was completed less than a year later, on May 22, 1922, and hosted commencement exercises for the graduating class in June.

The four-story building cost $400,000 (approximately $7 million present-day) and contained a gymnasium with seating for 300, an 833-seat auditorium, and 27 classrooms. Later that year, in August, the Kent School Board adopted a resolution to name the building after former U.S. President Theodore Roosevelt. The first classes were held in the building September 5, 1922 and it was dedicated September 22. By then, the high school enrollment had grown to approximately 400 students. In the late 1930s, a separate annex was built behind the building to house industrial arts classes. The North Prospect Street building served as the high school until 1959, when Roosevelt was relocated to a new building and campus along North Mantua Street in northern Kent. The building on North Prospect street was rededicated in 1959 as Davey Junior High School after the local Davey family and served as the junior high school for grades 7–9. It was later renamed Davey Middle School and housed grades 6–8. At the conclusion of the 1998–1999 school year, the building was closed for an extensive renovation, and reopened in 2000 as Davey Elementary School.

=== North Mantua campus ===
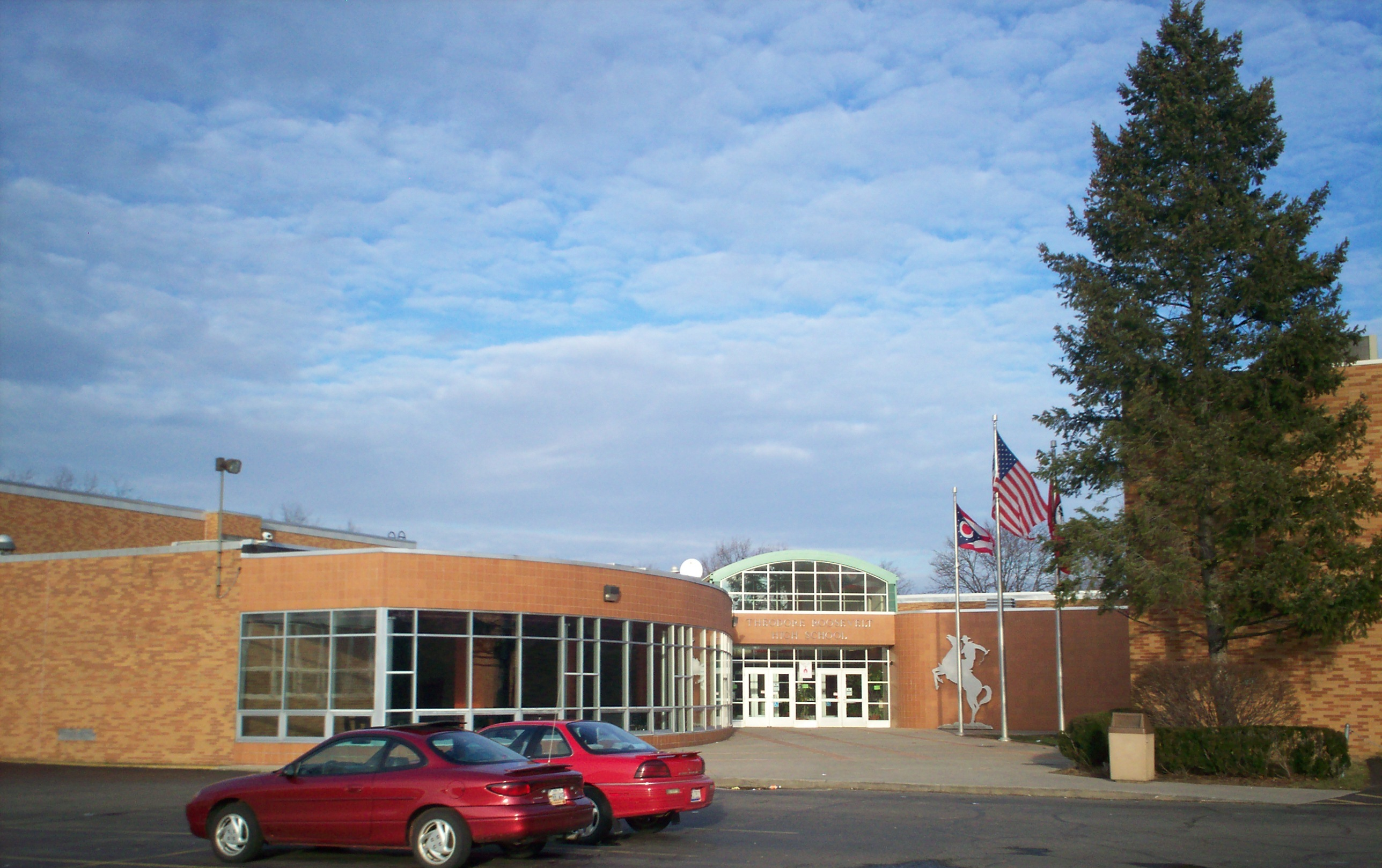
Main entrance, part of the 1997 renovations.

Further growth in Kent during the 1950s spurred discussion of a new high school with a larger campus offering more room for future expansion. In 1955, district voters approved a $1.5 million bond issue (approximately $18 million present-day) followed by a $650,000 bond issue (about $7 million present-day) in 1957 to fund a new high school, new elementary school, and renovation of the old high school to become a junior high school. Also in 1957, the school board purchased several acres of farmland along North Mantua Street as the site for the new high school campus. Although some viewed the site as too remote, construction began in 1958 and the building was opened September 8, 1959 housing 550 students in grades 10–12. Enrollment increases throughout the 1960s and 1970s would necessitate several additions and by 1968, the graduating class numbered 238 students. Also in 1959, the Franklin Township and Brady Lake districts merged with the Kent City School District, bringing additional students to Roosevelt. Prior to that time some students from Franklin Township and Brady Lake, neither of which had an accredited high school, attended Roosevelt as tuition-paying students to complete their high school diploma, while others finished at Kent State High School. The state of Ohio had previously paid tuition for rural schools without accredited high schools, but discontinued doing so in the late 1950s.

In 1972, 121 students from Kent State High School, which had closed earlier that year, were transferred to Roosevelt. Beginning in 1978, ninth graders started attending the high school again for the first time since 1959 due to overcrowding at Davey Junior High School. In 1985, Roosevelt was honored as one of 212 high schools in the United States to earn the Presidential Excellence in Education award from the U.S. Department of Education. Since 2004, Roosevelt has consistently been rated "Excellent" by the Ohio Department of Education and in December 2009, U.S. News & World Report named Roosevelt in the 2010 "Best High Schools" issue as a Bronze Medal school. The school earned a "Bronze Medal" ranking and was one of only 46 high schools in the state of Ohio to be named in the report. Roosevelt was named as a Bronze Medal school again in 2015, 2016, and 2018.

== Campus and facilities ==
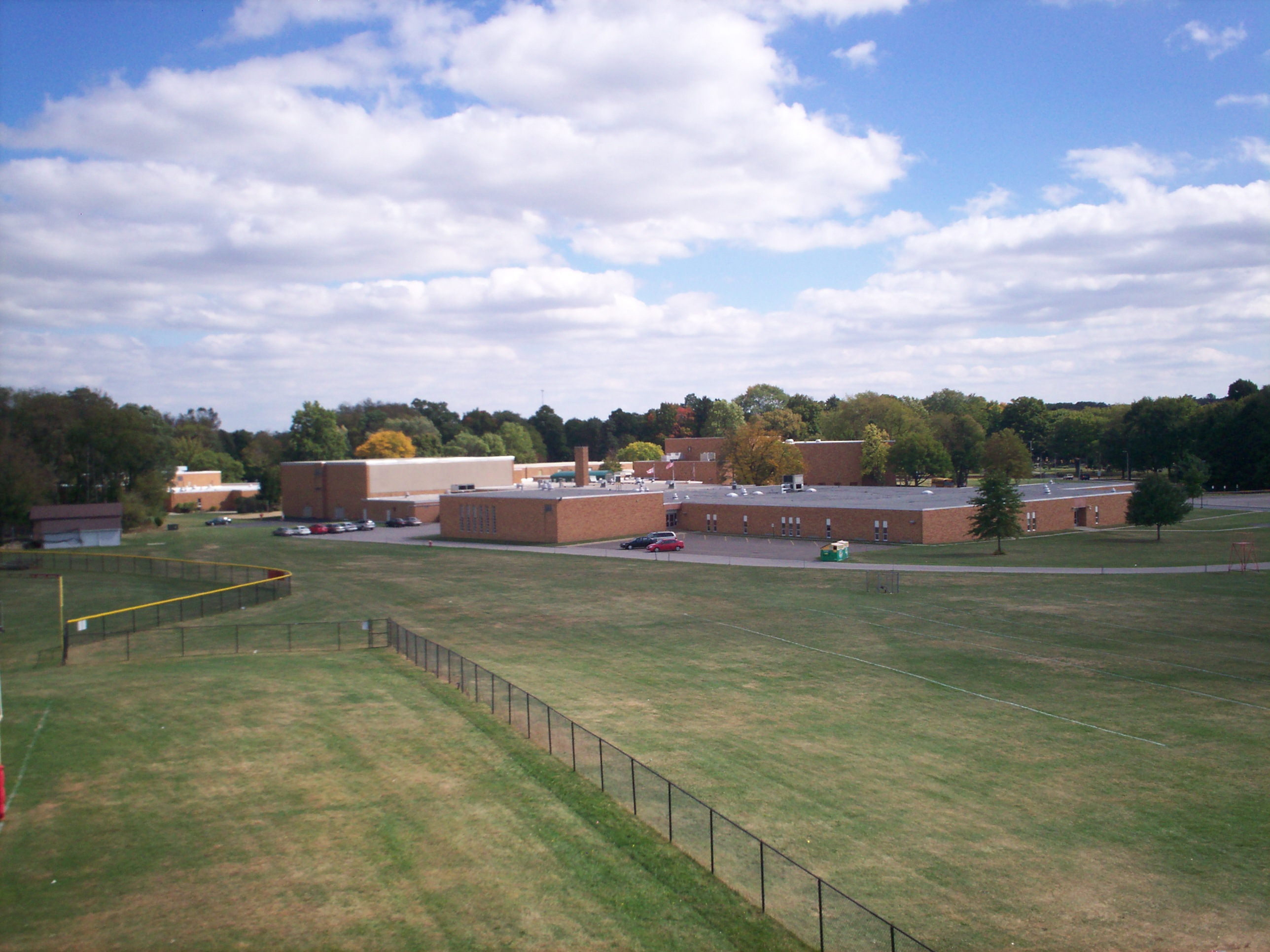
Roosevelt High School in 2010 looking southeast with baseball field visible on left and practice fields in foreground, prior to the 2022 and 2025 additions

In addition to approximately 70 classrooms, the building contains two multi-purpose gymnasiums, a 1,225 seat auditorium, a library, and a six-lane indoor swimming pool. When first opened in 1959, the building contained 27 classrooms, a library, and a gymnasium. Several additions have been made to the building and campus since 1959. In the mid-1960s, an additional classroom wing was added, followed in the early 1970s by construction of a vocational classroom wing and the auditorium and adjoining scene shop. In the late 1970s, two more additions were built; one wing containing classrooms and an indoor swimming pool and the other an expansion of the second floor. Additions in 1997 expanded the cafeteria and added a new art room and music storage room, along with several renovations and upgrades throughout the building. The most recent additions and updates to the building and campus were completed in 2022 and 2025. The 2022 addition was 14,000 square feet (1,300 m^{2}) and included a new competition gymnasium, physical education classroom, and entrance lobby, as well as a renovation of the Richard Roberts Auditorium. On the campus, a field house was constructed at the football stadium, and the staff and student parking lots were reconfigured and updated. The improvements were part of a district-wide project approved by voters in 2020. The 2025 addition was 3,500 square feet (330 m^{2}) for the Engineering and Advanced Technologies program and was funded mainly by a $2.3 million grant from the Ohio Career Technical Construction Program. It was dedicated April 24, 2025, by Ohio governor Mike DeWine.

The Roosevelt High School campus covers 90.5 acres (36.6 ha) along North Mantua Street (State Route 43) in northern Kent, adjacent to the corporate headquarters of the Davey Tree Expert Company. Along with the school building on the eastern end of the campus and Stanton Middle School on the western end, there are facilities and practice fields for several sports that are used for physical education and athletic competitions. The largest facility is Roosevelt Stadium, built in 1970, which includes an eight-lane all-weather running track, and locker rooms. It is used for football, track and field, field hockey, lacrosse, and soccer. It received a new artificial turf surface in 2021 and a field house in the sound end zone that houses new locker rooms, restrooms, the ticket booth, and concession stands, which was completed in 2022. Adjacent to Roosevelt Stadium on the west is the smaller Stanton Stadium, used for lacrosse and soccer, which has an additional nine-lane all-weather track used by Stanton Middle School. Between Stanton Stadium and Stanton Middle School is the Adam S. Hamilton Fitness Center, named after 2007 Roosevelt graduate and athlete Adam S. Hamilton, who was killed on duty in Afghanistan in 2011. The center is used by the various athletic teams, physical education classes, athletic healthcare program, and as a locker room for athletic teams who use Stanton Stadium. The fitness center opened in 2000 and is housed in the building that previously served as the district's bus garage prior to the construction of Stanton Middle School in 1997. It was renovated and rededicated in honor of Hamilton in 2015. On the other side of Roosevelt Stadium are the baseball field, softball field, and a six-court tennis complex with additional open practice fields spread mainly along the southern part of campus. These fields are generally used for field hockey, football, soccer, and lacrosse.

The campus site, previously a farm, was originally 31 acres (13 ha). Since its purchase in 1957 it has been expanded multiple times, with a 17.4-acre (7.0 ha) addition in 1967, a 19.5-acre (7.9 ha) expansion in 1990 that was used as the site for Stanton Middle School later that decade, and other adjacent parcels. Along with the construction of Stanton Middle School, several changes were made to the campus between 1997 and 2000, including additional sports facilities and practice fields and the realignment of Roosevelt Drive.

== Demographics ==
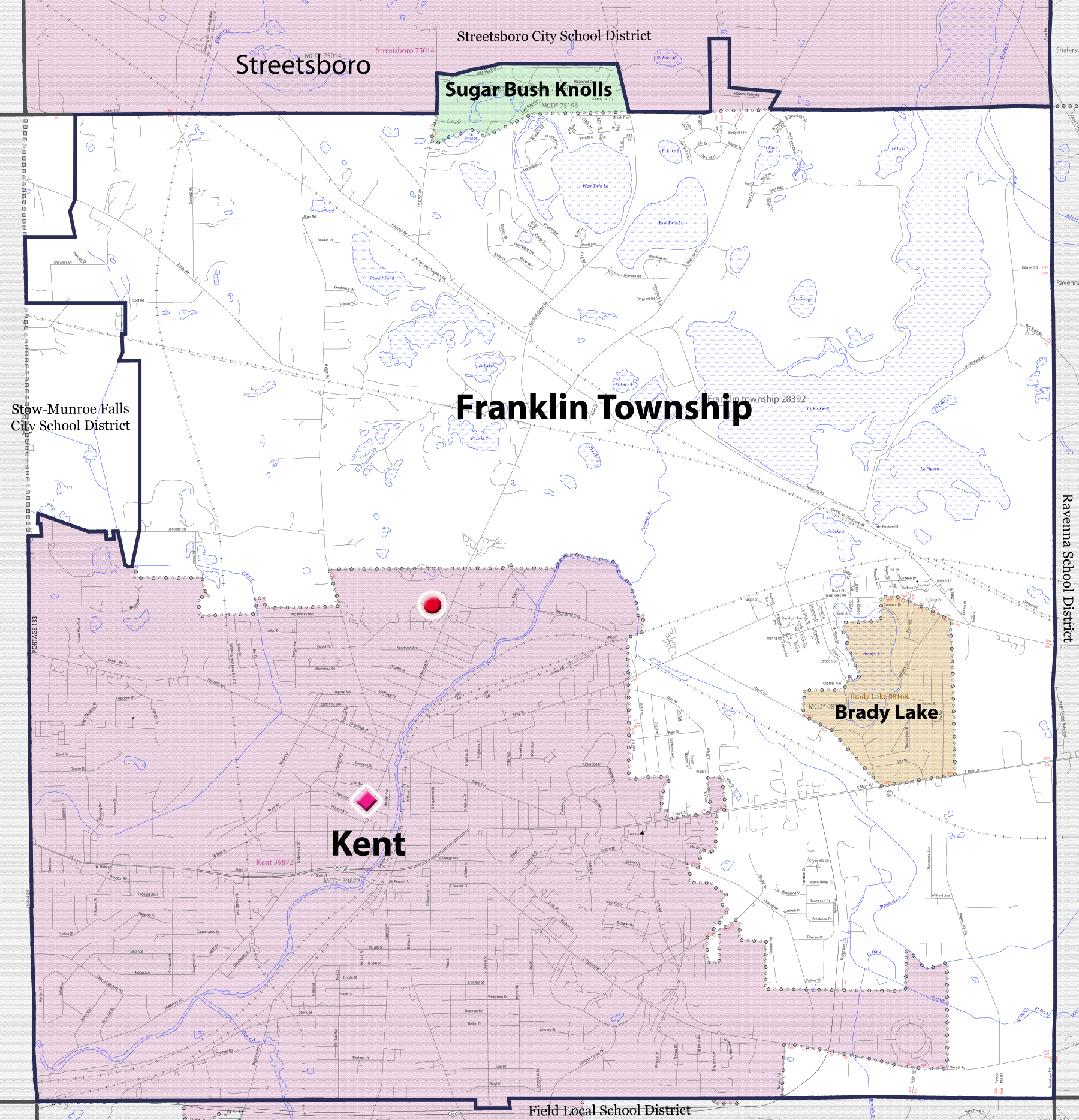
Location of the school (in red) and the former Central School Annex (in pink) within the Kent City School District

The Roosevelt student body comes from an area that includes most of the city of Kent, most of Franklin Township, and all of the village of Sugar Bush Knolls. A very small portion of Streetsboro is also included. The student body can also include those from outside the district through open enrollment, which is open to students from any school district in Ohio. During the 2018–19 school year, in which Roosevelt had a student body of 1,308, 78.2% of students were classified as non-Hispanic White, 10.9% non-Hispanic Black, 1.4% Asian, 2.8% Hispanic, and 6.5% multi-racial. 30.1% of Roosevelt students were labeled by the state of Ohio as economically disadvantaged, which classifies Roosevelt as a medium-low poverty school, and 14.4% of students were identified as having some sort of disability. The Roosevelt four-year graduation rate is 93.9%, which is above the state average of 82.2% and state requirement of 90%.

Dennis Love, a 1993 Roosevelt graduate, serves as principal, a position he has held since June 2015. Previously, he had been serving as an assistant. As of the 2018–19 academic year, the school employs a teaching faculty of 80 for an average student–teacher ratio of 16:1. 81% of teachers hold a master's degree or beyond. Additional staff members include a career education assistant principal, two unit assistant principals, support staff, aides, tutors, guidance counselors, and administration.

== Curriculum ==
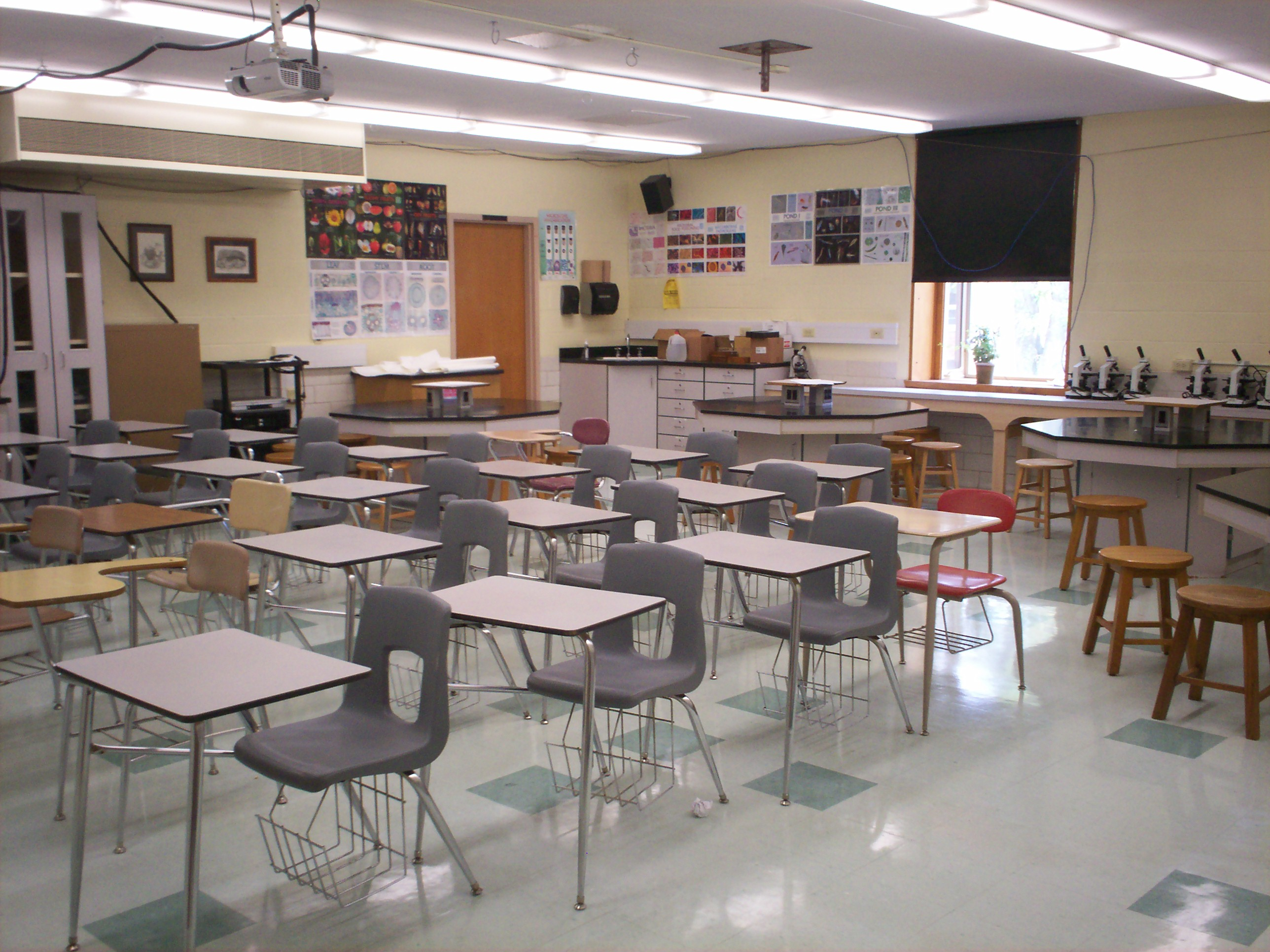
Biology classroom

The daily schedule is from 7:30 AM to 2:30 PM and consists of seven 51-minute periods with four minutes between each class and a 30-minute lunch period. Students who have lunch option are permitted to leave the campus during their lunch period and upperclassmen who have a study hall during their final period may leave early. The school year is divided into four 9-week grading periods which form two 18-week semesters. The first semester generally begins in mid-August and concludes in December while the second semester begins in early January and finishes in late May. State graduation requirements for the class of 2014 and beyond include 21.5 total credits. Of these, four must be in English, four in math, three each in science and social studies, one each in physical education and fine or practical arts, half a credit in health, and five elective credits. Within the credit requirements are specific classes that must be taken while the remainder can be filled by elective classes. Beginning with the class of 2017, the school began using the Cum Laude system for recognizing academic achievement instead of class rank. Curriculum is based on state content standards set by the Ohio Department of Education as well as additional national standards.

Roosevelt offers nearly 200 courses including 15 Advanced Placement (AP), 25 vocational education, and numerous elective and required classes at varying levels of interest and understanding. Advanced Placement courses are offered in biology, calculus AB and BC, chemistry, environmental science, physics 1 and 2, English literature, French, Spanish, U.S. government, human geography, U.S. history, statistics, and studio art. Successful completion of an AP course adds an additional point that is factored into a student's class rank. Additionally, students are able to take advanced courses at nearby colleges and universities such as Kent State University and the University of Akron through two post-secondary dual enrollment options, which allow students to take credits that either fill both their high school and college graduation requirements or are for college credit only.

Vocational programs, known as Career and College Tech Prep classes, are available at the school and through the Six District Educational Compact, which includes the Cuyahoga Falls, Hudson, Stow-Munroe Falls, Tallmadge, and Woodridge school districts. The compact, established in 1969, combines and shares the vocational programs and resources of member schools and allows students to participate in the programs that are offered at each of the schools even if the program is at another building. There are 25 programs, 11 of which are housed at Roosevelt. Of the 25, six are College Tech Prep Initiative programs that allow students to earn both high school and college credits, while the remaining 19 programs are Career Programs designed to give students training and work experience. College Tech Prep programs housed at Roosevelt include those in athletic healthcare and fitness, manufacturing and engineering, landscape horticulture, and early childhood education. Career Programs housed at Roosevelt include two business-related programs, computer-aided design and manufacturing technologies, construction and remodeling, cosmetology, electronics, health technology, marketing, and out-of-school internships. Additional programs available through the compact that are housed at other schools include aviation, culinary arts, theater arts, automotive repair and technology, banking and finance, and early childhood educational aide training. Each program also has co-curricular component, meaning they have both in-class and outside requirements and responsibilities that are factored into the student's overall grade. One example is the Roosevelt chapter of DECA, which is part of the marketing education program. In 2016, DECA members representing Roosevelt advanced to the international competition for the 30th consecutive year.

=== Academies ===
The Expedition Academy is an advanced program based on the Expeditionary Learning model of Kurt Hahn and uses both traditional and experimental teaching methods and models. It was formed in 1999 as a result of a study using focus groups and interviews of 300 students which found that students generally felt they needed more "real-world" applications to their school work including community service, problem solving, and curriculum integration. The two-year program includes advanced courses in English, U.S. and world history, biology, and ecology and also includes a health class and an academy-specific physical education class integrated with outdoor education and community service.

=== Arts ===
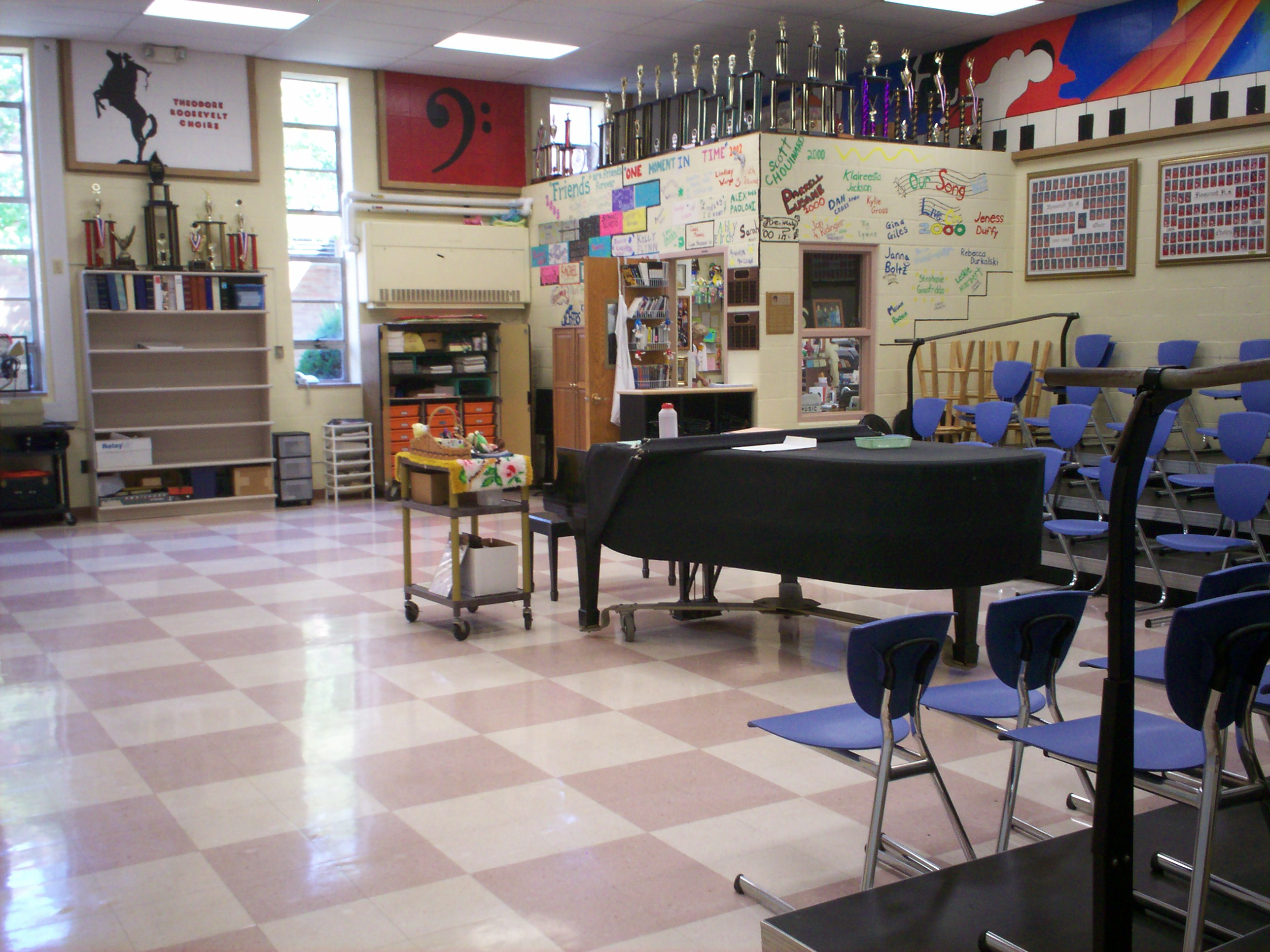
Choir room

Roosevelt offers several visual and performing arts classes and programs that vary according to grade level and interest. Classes are also available in practical arts, such as consumer science, information technology, and industrial technology. While all fine and practical arts classes are electives, one full-year credit of either fine or practical arts is required to graduate.

Roosevelt offers four successive levels of general art classes, as well as classes in drawing and painting, clay and sculpture, glass and fiber, and an Advanced Placement studio art class that focuses on portfolio development. Three successive levels of photography classes are also offered. Generally, each art class lasts for a semester. A full-year general music theory class is offered for students of varying musical backgrounds, and semester-long courses in acting and directing and play production are also available.

The musical performing arts programs—band, orchestra, and choir—are considered co-curricular, with the out-of-class requirements usually in the form of performances and additional rehearsals not during the school day. Each musical group also has additional extra-curricular ensembles and solo opportunities. Ensembles and soloists participate annually in the Ohio Music Education Association (OMEA) Solo and Ensemble Adjudicated Event, while the main groups participate in OMEA's Large Group Adjudicated Event. These events allow students to perform for judges and receive a rating and comments based on specific criteria.

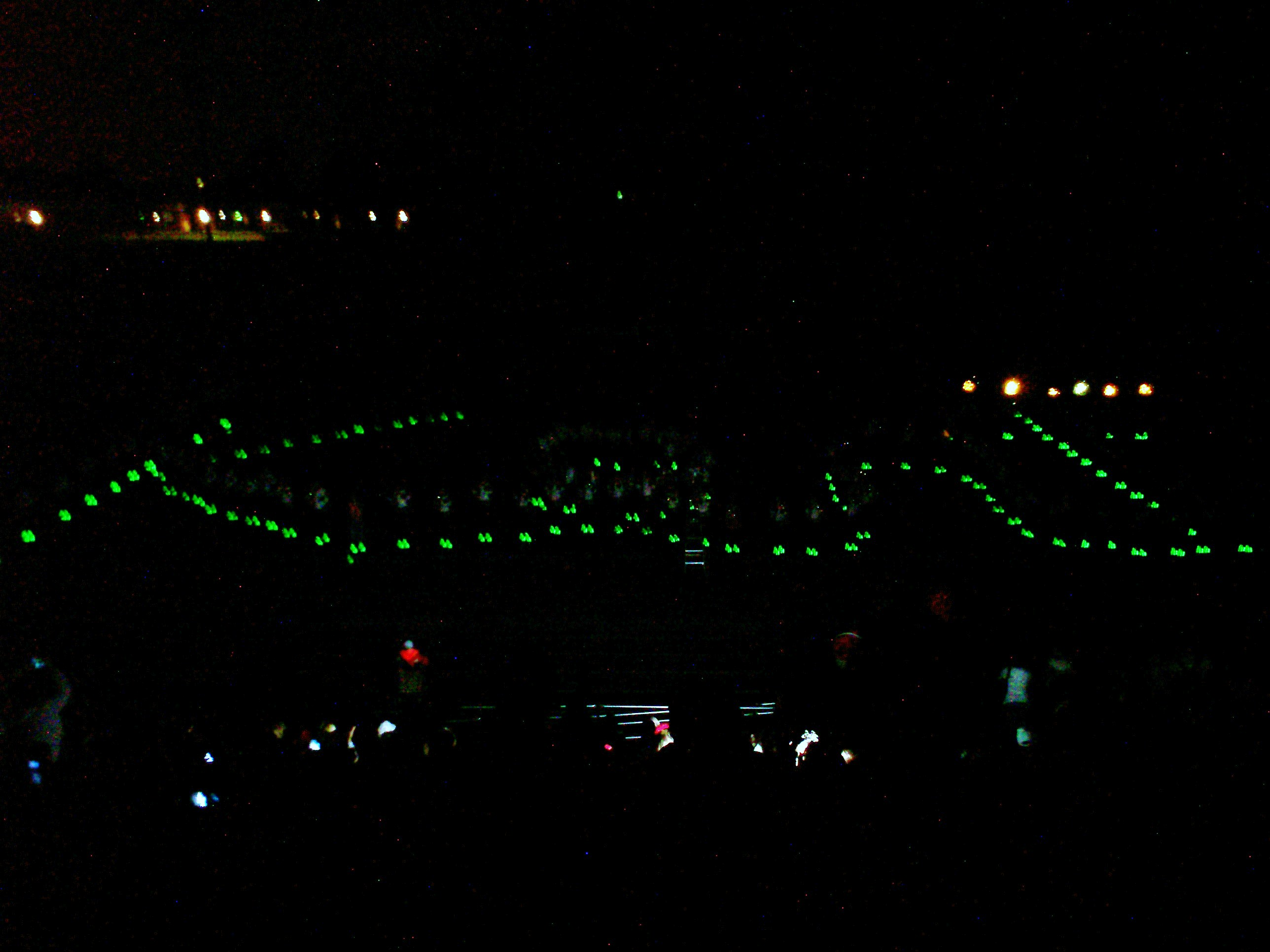
Rough Rider Marching Band performance of "Script Kent" in 2009

The Rough Rider Marching Band and flag corps perform at home and away football games, and at local and national competitions. In late October, after the football season, the band separates into concert band and wind symphony ensembles. Immediately after the final home game of every season, the band performs what is known as "Script Kent", a formation similar to "Script Ohio" performed by The Ohio State University Marching Band and using the same song, Le Régiment de Sambre et Meuse by Robert Planquette. As part of the tradition, the band spells out "Kent" with the stadium lights off and band members wearing green glow sticks around their ankles that are uncovered only after the stadium lights have been turned off. The marching band also hosts a yearly band show in late August, known as the "Roosevelt Premier of Bands" that features several local high school bands and marches in Kent's annual Memorial Day parade in May. Additional extra-curricular performance groups include Jazz Band and brass, woodwind, percussion ensembles. The Roosevelt orchestra program is composed mainly of an all-string chamber orchestra. Extracurricular ensembles include a pit orchestra for the school's annual musical production and several smaller ensembles.

The choral program includes an entry-level mixed four-part choir known as Concert Choir, an all-treble voice choir called Chorale, and a mixed four-part choir called ChoralWorks. Membership in ChoralWorks and Chorale is determined by audition, with members typically rising from Concert Choir to Chorale (if a Soprano or Alto) to ChoralWorks. The choirs generally have three regular concerts during the school year, with additional performances in and outside of school at various times of the year. There is also one additional extracurricular ensemble: a four-part mixed ensemble known as ACEs (Advanced Choral Ensemble) with members determined by audition at the beginning of each school year. Every May, the choirs, along with the Jazz Band, stage a POPs concert that features music from a variety of time periods and genres and also includes choreography and additional solo and small group performances. The concert typically features eight combined-choir songs, eight Jazz Band songs, and a number of POPs Specials, or independently-led performances by either small groups of students or larger student-led ensembles such as the OAFA (Once And For All) ensemble. The concert has been held every year since 1970. Since 2013, a madrigal dinner in the style of a medieval or Renaissance boar's head festival, is held in early December. Members of ChoralWorks and Chorale wear period costumes and sing period repertoire while guests are served a three-course meal.

Practical arts classes include those in consumer science, information technology, and industrial technology. Generally, courses are for a semester, though a number of full-year classes are offered. Consumer science classes include those in areas such as cooking, sewing, interior design, relationships, and personal planning. Classes offered in industrial and information technologies are separate from the vocational programs also available. Industrial tech classes include those in cabinetry, woods and metal, electronics, and computer-aided design while information tech classes include those in law, accounting, sports and entertainment management, and aspects of digital media.

=== Additional courses and electives ===
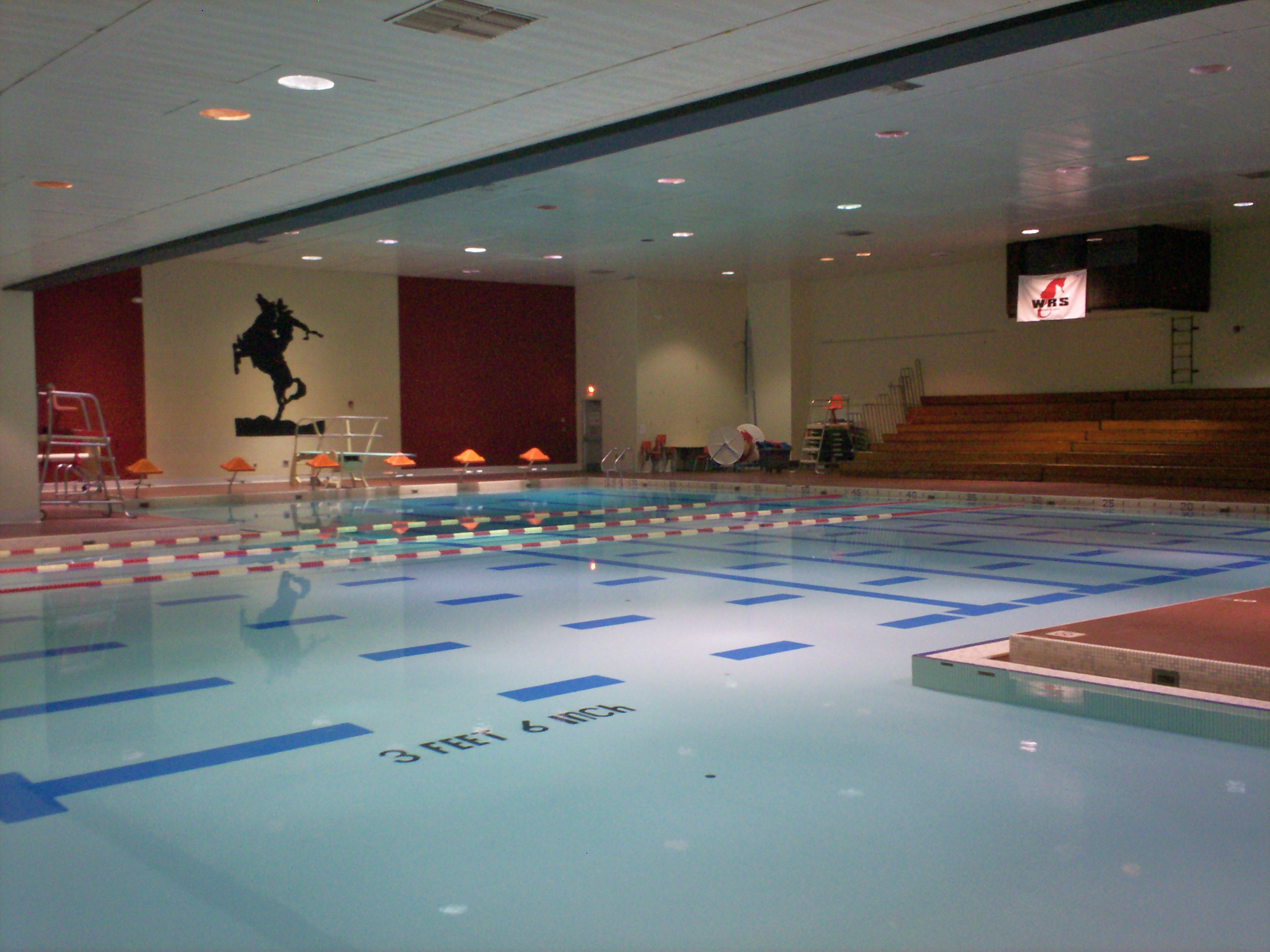
The Roosevelt pool, built 1975–76

In addition to the required courses for subjects such as English, math, physical education, science, and social studies, a number of additional elective classes are offered, many of which can be substituted for traditional classes. At times, foreign language courses in Arabic and Mandarin Chinese were offered in addition to the four-year sequences of German, French, Latin, and Spanish classes. The Chinese language class was taught by an exchange teacher from China who came to the U.S. through a grant from the Ohio Department of Education. Arabic classes began in August 2010.

A general English class for each grade level is required for graduation. Required English courses are full-year classes that can be taken at the comprehensive, college preparatory, or advanced levels with Advanced Placement available in 12th grade. Additional elective English classes include those in African American literature, women's studies and literature, public speaking, poetry, journalism, short story writing, writing research papers, and the works of William Shakespeare. A news magazine production class produces The Colonel, the school magazine published 10 times per academic year. The school yearbook, the Rough Rider, is produced by the yearbook production course. Staff members of The Colonel have won a number of awards at state competitions, including the All-Ohio Award for best overall news magazine from the Ohio Scholastic Media Association in 2010. English electives last one semester, except the full-year news magazine and yearbook production classes, and can only be taken along with the required English classes.

Within the physical education requirement, known as Dimensions of Physical Education, students have a choice of four programs of study in individual and net sports, dance, bodybuilding, and team sports. Ninth-grade students are required to take the one-semester class and an additional semester is required for graduation. Each dimension program also includes a session in aquatics and personal fitness. Lifeguard training is also offered as a course and can be used to gain certification as a Professional Rescuer in first aid, CPR, and lifeguarding from the American Red Cross.

The social studies requirement includes world history and U.S. history, a semester-long course in U.S. government, and a half-credit elective. World history has an advanced option while U.S. history is also offered as an Advanced Placement course. Advanced Placement U.S. government is offered as a year-long course that includes a semester in comparative government and a field trip to Washington, DC. Semester-long elective courses, which can fulfill either the elective portion of the graduation requirements or the social studies elective, include those on violence in the United States, sociology, psychology, American popular culture, African American history, economics, and a leadership and community service-oriented course known as Riders Taking Action.

== Extracurricular activities ==
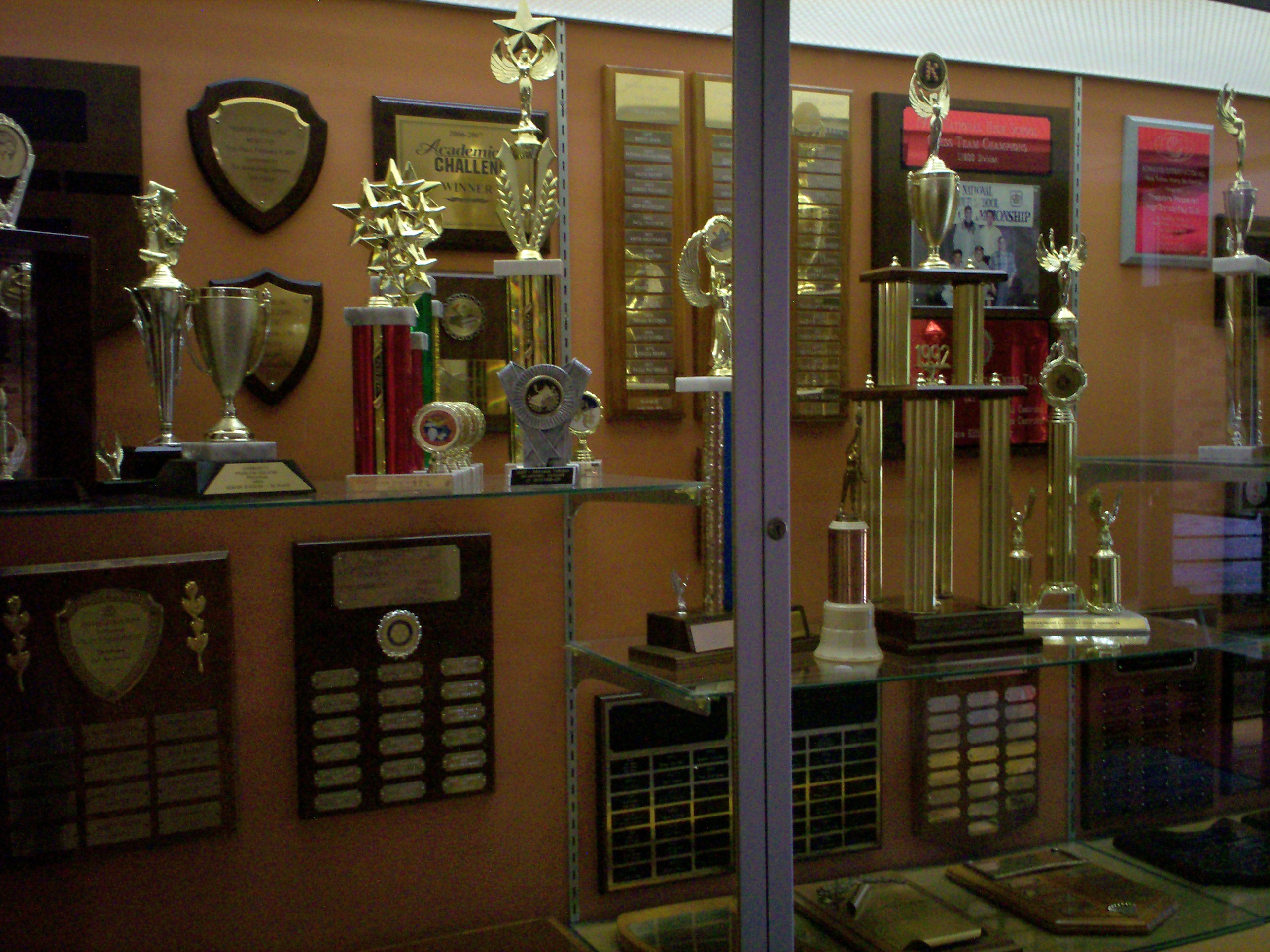
Trophy case featuring the 1992 National High School Chess Championship trophy along with other awards

In addition to many of the co-curricular activities associated with the various classes, there are several extracurricular clubs at the school. Honorary organizations National Honor Society and Quill and Scroll have active chapters at Roosevelt while national and international organizations like the American Civil Liberties Union, Key Club, Amnesty International, and American Field Service (AFS) also have associated clubs at the school. In addition to the musical performing arts ensembles, there is also a chapter of the International Thespian Society honorary organization that is part of the Roosevelt Drama Guild. Drama Guild typically presents three productions each school year: a musical in the winter, one-acts in either fall or spring, and a play or experimental production in the fall or spring. Academic competition clubs such as an Academic Challenge quiz bowl team and Future Problem Solving are offered as well as a general foreign language club and separate clubs for the German, French, Latin, and Spanish language classes. General interest clubs and organizations include a chess club, athletic boosters, student council, arts promotion clubs ForArts (Friends of Roosevelt Art Society) and the RHS Film Society, a general science club along with clubs for the environment and zoology, and Gamers' Guild. There is also an African American youth-focused club known as Project Unity, a gay-straight alliance, and an active Special Olympics team.

A number of Roosevelt's extracurricular clubs and activities have been successful in competitions at state, national, and international levels. The Roosevelt Chess Club won the 1992 High School National Championship in the U-1600 division while the Special Olympics team has had several individual medalists at state competitions. The Academic Challenge team won their three-team televised round of the show in 2007 which earned them an 8th-place finish overall in Northeast Ohio out of 87 schools. In 2003 and 2009 they placed second in their televised competition and also have first-place finishes in 1985 and 1993. The Future Problem Solving teams, which includes Community Problem Solving, has had a number of team and individual placings at the state and international competition including a fourth-place individual placing at the 2004 international competition and second- and third-place finishes in various categories at the 2006 international competition.

=== Athletics ===
Rough Rider logo

Roosevelt's teams are known as the Rough Riders, owing to the school's namesake Theodore Roosevelt, and the school colors are red, white, and black. As of 2026, Roosevelt fields 29 varsity athletic teams, the most recent addition being the girls flag football team, which was announced in February 2026 and began play in March. It was the first new athletic team added since girls golf became a varsity sport in 2013. There are additional teams in most sports at the junior varsity level as well as a few sports that have freshman-only teams. All teams except the golf, ice hockey, and bowling have their home games in facilities on the Roosevelt campus. Ice hockey home games are held in the Kent State University Ice Arena, boys golf plays their home matches at Windmill Lakes Golf Club in Ravenna, girls golf uses the Fairways of Twin Lakes in Franklin Township, and the bowling teams have home matches at the Kent Lanes bowling alley.

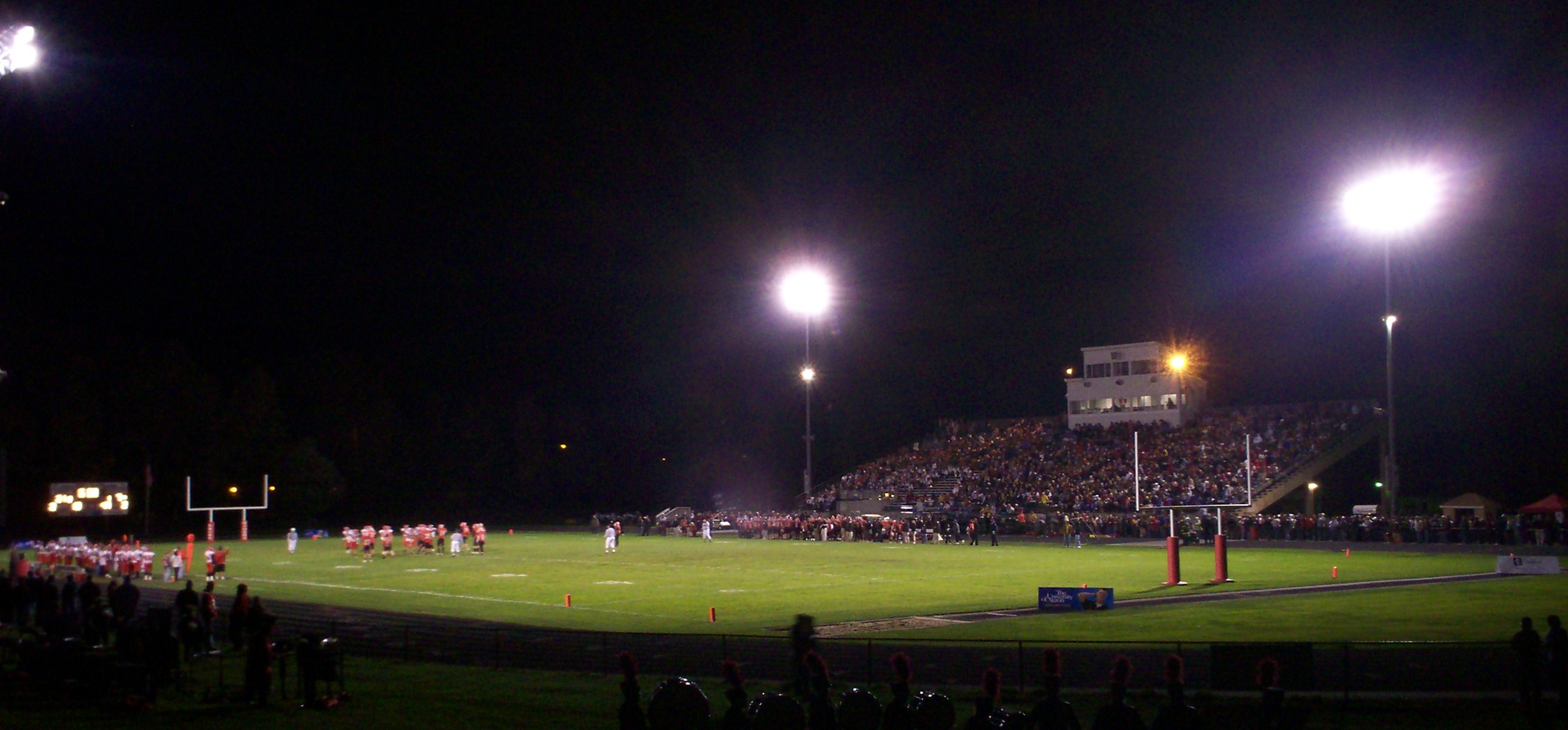
Homecoming football game, October 17, 2008

The school is a member the Ohio High School Athletic Association (OHSAA) and competes at the OHSAA Division II and III levels, which is based by sport and on enrollment and is recalculated every two years. Since June 2026 Roosevelt has been a member of the Metro Athletic Conference for all sports except ice hockey, field hockey, boys and girls lacrosse and girls flag football. Ice hockey competes in the Greater Cleveland High School Hockey League and field hockey in the Northeast Ohio Field Hockey League. Both boys and girls lacrosse compete in Division II, with the boys team part of the Ohio High School Lacrosse Association and the girls lacrosse team in the Ohio Schoolgirls Lacrosse Association. Prior to the 2016–17 school year, lacrosse was not an OHSAA sanctioned sport. Girls flag football competes in the Cleveland Browns Girls High School Flag Football League, Southern Conference, Orange Division.

Roosevelt was a member of the Trolley League, later called the Western Reserve League, from 1919 until 1948 when the league dissolved. After competing as an independent, the school joined the Metropolitan League in 1954. The Riders competed in the Metro League until it was absorbed in 1996 by the formation of the Western Reserve Conference. From 1996–2005, the Rough Riders were part of the WRC South Division. Roosevelt joined the Portage Trail Conference Metro Division in 2005 and competed in the league until 2015. During the time in the PTC, girls golf competed in the Northeast Ohio Independent School Girls Golf League, and swimming and diving in the Northeast Aquatic Conference since the PTC did not have enough teams for league play in those sports. From 2015 to 2026, Roosevelt was a member of the Suburban League American Division for all sports except field hockey, ice hockey, boys and girls lacrosse, and girls flag football.

==== Rivalries ====
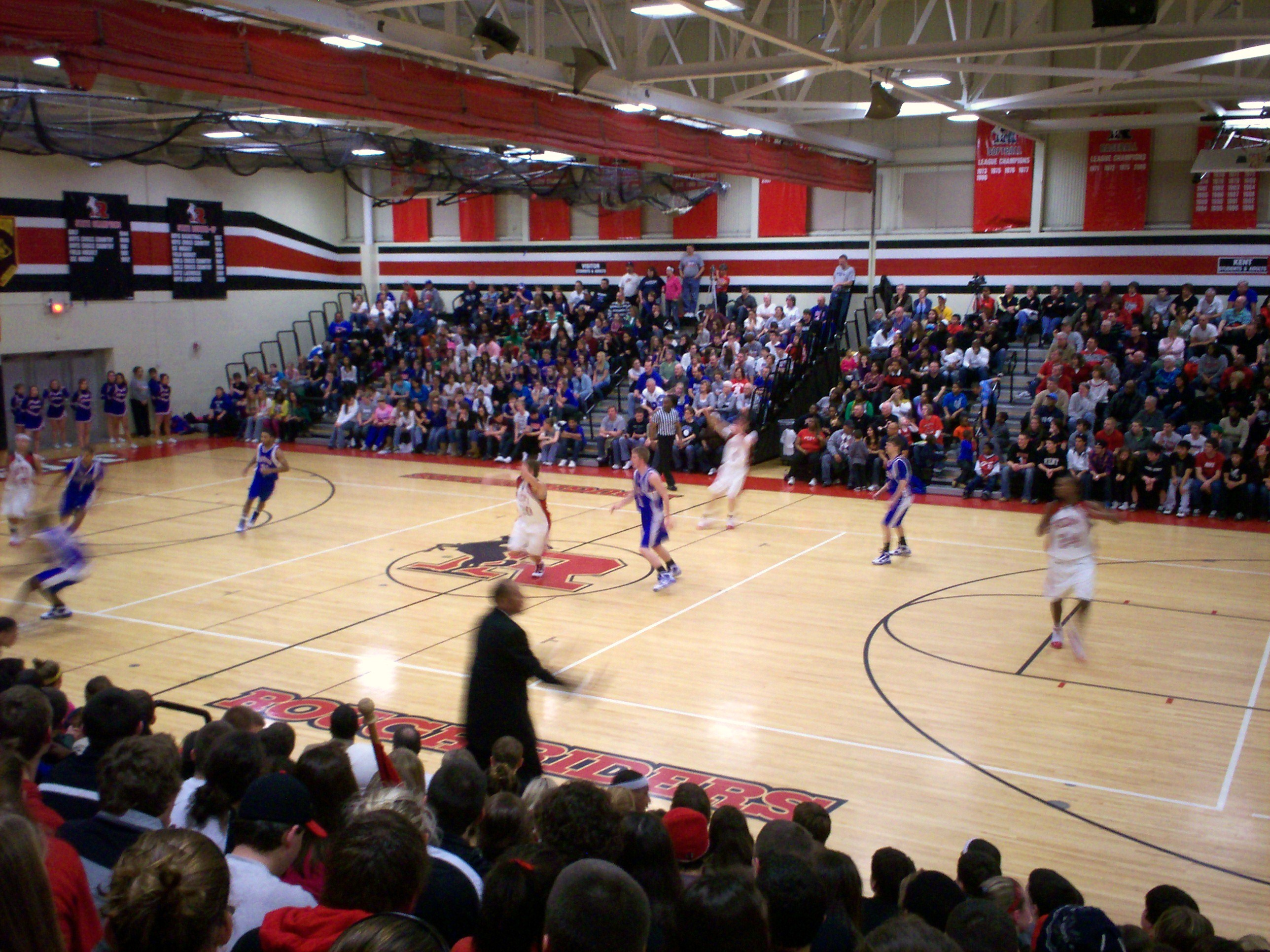
January 2010 boys basketball game against the Ravenna Ravens

Roosevelt's archrival is the Ravenna High School Ravens, located in nearby Ravenna. The two schools were long-time rivals in successive athletic leagues from 1919 to 1948 and again from 1963 to 2015. During the 2026–27 school year they will again be in the same league, though Ravenna plans on moving to a new league beginning in 2027. The rivalry, most prominent in football, began in the early 20th century and can be traced to the longtime rivalry between the cities of Kent and Ravenna that dates back to the early 19th century. With Roosevelt's shift to the Suburban League, the two schools have continued to play in many sports. Roosevelt also has a long-standing rivalry with the Bulldogs of Stow–Munroe Falls High School, located in neighboring Stow, as the two schools are only around 2 miles (3 km) apart. Both schools were league rivals for over 50 years in the former Metro League and Western Reserve Conference until Roosevelt joined the PTC in 2005. Since then the two have continued to meet in a variety of sports including football, soccer, boys basketball, swimming and diving, and field hockey. During Roosevelt's tenure in the Suburban League, both schools were league members, but in opposite divisions.

==== Championships ====
Several Roosevelt teams have enjoyed both league and state success. The football team, established in 1910, has won 24 league titles with the most recent being in 2013. The team has had undefeated regular seasons in 1922, 1966, 1990, 2006, and 2008 with state playoff appearances in 2006, 2008, 2010, 2011, 2012, and 2013. The program has produced a number of players who have gone on to play major college football and professionally in the National Football League (NFL) including Mike Adamle, Deral Boykin, Tom DeLeone, and Stan White. The boys golf team has been one of the school's most successful and consistent teams winning 40 league titles through the 2025–26 season. The team has posted two undefeated regular seasons, in 1983 and again in 2009.

State championships		State runners-up
Sport	Year(s)	Sport	Year(s)
Boys cross country	1980, 1981	Boys basketball	1957
Girls field hockey	1981	Boys cross country	1979
Boys ice hockey	1982	Girls field hockey	1988
		Boys ice hockey	1981
		Girls cross country	1997, 1999
		Boys lacrosse	2001, 2005

The boys cross country team won back-to-back state titles in 1980 and 1981 after a runner-up finish in 1979, and the girls cross country team posted runner-up finishes in 1997 and 1999. In 2010, the 1980 boys cross country team was awarded the National Cross Country Co-Championship by XCNation.com, the National Historical Archives for prep cross country. Recognized as one of the top teams in U.S. history, the team ran three of the top five team averages for 2.5 miles ever during the 1980 season. The 12:04 team average at the Warrior Classic and 12:17 at the Ohio State Championships rank as two of the top team performances all-time. Additional state titles have been won by the girls field hockey team in 1981 with a runner-up finish in 1988, and the boys ice hockey team in 1982 after finishing as runner-up the year prior.

Boys basketball has won 22 league titles, the most recent being in 2012, and played in consecutive OHSAA district championship games in 2009 and 2010. The team enjoyed their greatest season in 1957 when they advanced to the state championship game, falling to Middletown High School, which was led by future NBA great Jerry Lucas. The boys lacrosse team, formed in 2000, has state runner-up finishes in 2001 and 2005 along with state final four appearances by boys soccer and boys volleyball in 1999.

Roosevelt also fields girls soccer, girls tennis, and girls volleyball in the fall sports season (August–November) along with football, field hockey, boys soccer, boys and girls cross country, boys and girls golf, and cheerleading. In the winter sports season (November–February), in addition to the boys basketball and ice hockey teams, there are also boys and girls bowling, girls basketball, boys and girls swimming and diving, and wrestling teams, plus an additional cheerleading squad. During the spring sports season (March–June), Roosevelt fields baseball, softball, girls lacrosse, boys and girls track and field, and boys tennis teams along with the boys lacrosse and boys volleyball teams.

== Notable alumni ==
- Mike Adamle, class of 1967; professional football player in the National Football League (NFL), television commentator, and general manager of WWE Raw
- Julianne Baird, class of 1970; noted singer and teacher of voice
- Deral Boykin, class of 1988; professional football player in the NFL
- Greg Boykin, class of 1972; professional football player in the NFL
- Tom Campana, class of 1968; professional football player in the Canadian Football League
- Vincent J. Cardinal, class of 1978; director and playwright
- Bob Casale, class of 1970; musician for the band Devo
- Gerald Casale, class of 1966; musician and founding member of the band Devo
- Martin L. Davey, class of 1900; served as a member of the U.S. House of Representatives and Governor of Ohio
- Tom DeLeone, class of 1968; professional football player in the NFL
- Joe Dufek, class of 1979; professional football player in the NFL
- Joe Ebanks, class of 2003; professional poker player in the World Series of Poker
- Kayla Fischer, class of 2018; professional soccer player in the National Women's Soccer League
- Ahmed Gallab, class of 2002; professional singer and composer, known as Sinkane
- Billy C. Hawkins, class of 1972; educator and academic administrator
- Todd Hido, class of 1986; fine art photographer, shown in 40 museums around the world and over 20 published books
- Riley Larkin, class of 2015; professional football coach in the NFL
- Desmeal Leigh, class of 2022; college football player for the Youngstown State Penguins
- Tony Mandarich, class of 1985; professional football player in the NFL
- Errol Prisby, class of 1961; professional football player in the NFL
- Rod Reisman, class of 1971; original drummer for the band Devo
- Gary Roberts, class of 1965; professional football player in the NFL
- Brian Rogers, class of 2002; professional fighter in mixed martial arts
- Joshua Seth, class of 1987; hypnotist and voice actor
- Seth Stewart, class of 2002; Broadway actor, dancer, and singer; original cast member of Hamilton
- Jeff Strand, class of 1989; Bram Stoker Award-winning author
- Stan White, class of 1968; professional football player in the NFL
- Dana Wright, class of 1982; professional football player in the NFL
