= Dr. William R. Harvey Museum of Art =

- Established: 2014
- Location: Talladega College, Talladega, Alabama, USA
- Coordinates: 33.43304°N 86.11219°W
- Type: Art museum
- Key holdings: Amistad Mutiny murals by Hale Woodruff
- Founder: William R. Harvey
- Owner: Talladega College

The Dr. William R. Harvey Museum of Art is an art museum at Talladega College in Talladega, Alabama in the United States. The museum, which is named after donor and alumni William R. Harvey, includes the Amistad Mutiny murals by Hale Woodruff.

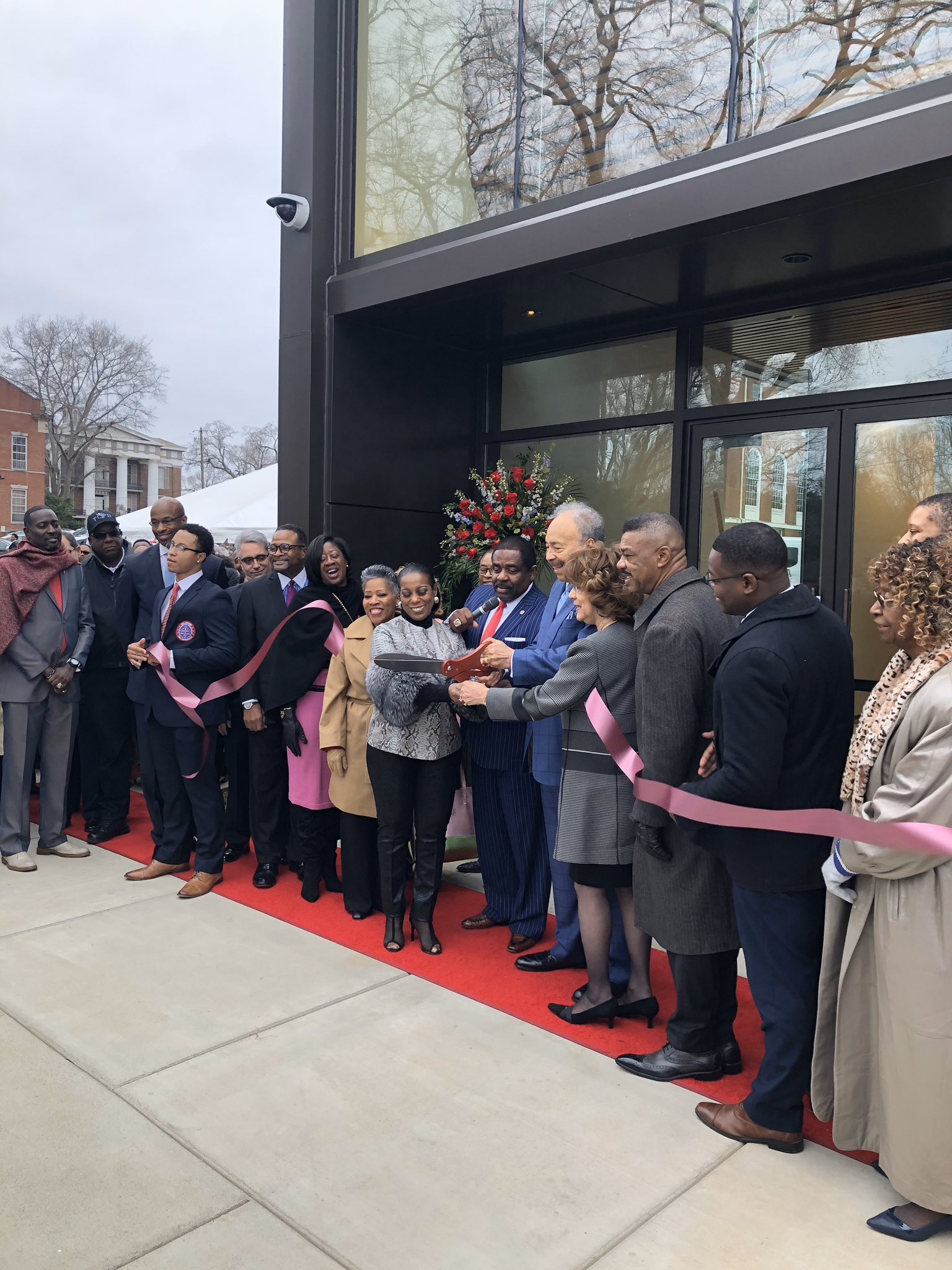
The ribbon cutting at the Dr. William R. Harvey Museum of Art in January 2020.

== History ==
In 2014, William R. Harvey, an alumnus of Talledega College, and his family, donated $1.3 million to Talladega College which established an art museum in Harvey's name. Groundbreaking for the museum took place in November 2017. The State of Alabama, led by governor Kay Ivey, donated $1.5 million to the construction efforts.

The Dr. William R. Harvey Museum of Art opened on February 3, 2020. The ribbon cutting included Harvey and Talladega College president Billy C. Hawkins.

== Architecture and design ==
The museum is 9,730 square feet in size.

== Collections ==
The museum's permanent collection includes the Amistad Mutiny murals by Hale Woodruff.
