= Stan White (linebacker) =

American football player (born 1949)

- White in 1977

No. 54, 53, 52
- Position: Linebacker

Personal information
- Born: October 24, 1949 (age 77); Dover, Ohio, U.S.
- Listed height: 6 ft 1 in (1.85 m)
- Listed weight: 225 lb (102 kg)

Career information
- High school: Theodore Roosevelt (Kent, Ohio)
- College: Ohio State
- NFL draft: 1972: 17th round, 438th overall pick

Career history
- Baltimore Colts (1972–1979); Detroit Lions (1980–1982); Chicago Blitz (1983); Arizona Wranglers (1984)

Awards and highlights
- All-USFL (1983); National champion (1970); First-team All-Big Ten (1971)

Career NFL statistics
- Games played: 153
- Starts: 139
- Interceptions: 34
- Interception touchdowns: 2
- Interception yards: 428
- Stats at Pro Football Reference

Stanley Ray White (born October 24, 1949) is an American former professional football player who was a linebacker in the National Football League (NFL) and United States Football League (USFL). A defensive leader for the NFL's Baltimore Colts and Detroit Lions, White later became a analyst for televised games of the Baltimore Ravens, successor to the Colts in the league.

White was the first active player to sign with the USFL in 1983 and was named to the All-USFL team during that year.

== Early life ==
White was born in Dover, Ohio and grew up in Kent, Ohio. White attended Theodore Roosevelt High School. He was the only player in the history of Ohio High School sports to play in the state all-star games for football, basketball, and baseball. He was 1st team All State twice in football, All State in Basketball as a senior averaging 25 points a game, and All State in baseball playing catcher as a senior hitting 0.467 (He pitched a championship game and won 1-0 with 17 strikeouts). Against Ravenna his senior year he scored every way possible: He scored a touchdown and a two point conversion, kicked a field goal and an extra point, and tackled the quarterback in the end zone for a safety. His senior year ten Roosevelt players played both offense and defense, and six of those ended up playing in the NFL. White graduated in 1968.

== Football career ==
=== College ===
White played college football at Ohio State University, where he was an All-Big Ten and All-American selection. He also played baseball and basketball at OSU. When he left OSU he held the OSU records for career tackles, tackles in a season (1970), and tackles in a game (Michigan State 1970). He also briefly held the record for most extra points kicked in a season(1969).

=== NFL ===
White was selected in the 17th round of the 1972 NFL draft, the 438th player out of 442 taken. White played for the Baltimore Colts and the Detroit Lions. He was named First Team All NFL in 1975 by The Football News, and First Team All NFL in 1977 by The New York Daily News.

White scored two touchdowns, both from interception returns and both for the Colts; the first was in 1973 against the Houston Oilers from a Dan Pastorini interception, the second coming against the New York Giants from a Craig Morton interception in 1975. He was a UPI 1st Team All AFC linebacker in 1977. White still holds the single season NFL record for linebackers of eight interceptions in a season (1975), and is second all-time for linebackers with 34 career interceptions. He is third all-time in takeaways for linebackers with 49, behind Jack Ham and Ray Lewis. He was selected as a linebacker on the Baltimore Colts All-Time Team. He is also the only player in NFL history to have at least seven sacks and seven interceptions in a single season(1977-8 sacks,7 int). In fact only four times has a player had at 6 sacks and 6 interceptions in a season and White did it twice(1975,1977) Rodney Harrison and Dave Duerson are the other two.

White left the NFL after the 1982 season.

=== USFL ===
Following his departure from the Lions, White played in the United States Football League (USFL) for the Chicago Blitz and the Arizona Wranglers, becoming the first active NFL player to sign with the new league. He was All-USFL, and was also selected to the Madden All-Time USFL Team.

== Broadcasting and other endeavors ==
Since 2006, White has worked as a color analyst for the Baltimore Ravens' radio broadcasts, teaming with Gerry Sandusky, who does the play-by-play, and former Ravens player Qadry Ismail. He also contributes to other programming on Baltimore station WBAL-AM. He previously worked for ESPN, NBC Radio NFL games, and Home Team Sports.

White is a lawyer, graduating magna cum laude from the University of Baltimore School of Law in 1978. He went at night during the season and full-time in the off season, completing his degree in four years. His first job was with Ron Shapiro, noted sports lawyer. His classmates included sports agents Tom Condon and Tony Agnone.

White's book, If These Walls Could Talk: Baltimore Ravens, published by Triumph Books, was released in October 2017.

== Personal life ==
White and his wife have two daughters and a son.
