= Samuel U. Rodgers =

American public health pioneer

Samuel Ulysses Rodgers
- Born: August 10, 1917; Anniston, Alabama, U.S.
- Died: December 19, 1999 (aged 82); Kansas City, Missouri, U.S.
- Education: Talladega College (BS); Howard University College of Medicine (MD); University of Michigan (MPH)
- Occupations: Physician, educator
- Military career
- Allegiance: United States
- Branch: United States Army
- Service years: 1943–1947
- Rank: Major
- Unit: Medical Corps
- Conflicts: World War II
- Awards: Combat Medical Badge

Samuel Ulysses Rodgers (August 10, 1917 – December 19, 1999) was an American physician, educator, and public health advocate. He was a pioneer in the community health movement, including establishing the Samuel U. Rodgers Health Center (originally the Wayne Miner Neighborhood Health Center) in 1968, which became the first Federally Qualified Health Center in Missouri and a national model for providing comprehensive care to impoverished populations.

He graduated Howard University College of Medicine, and served as a Major in the United States Army Medical Corps during World War II, where he earned a Combat Medical Badge. His experience in desegregated military facilities contrasted sharply with the segregated medical system in Kansas City, Missouri, leading him to organize the 1947 resident physicians' strike at General Hospital No. 2 to demand equitable training and resources. He was the fifth African American physician in the United States to become board-certified in obstetrics and gynecology and served on the faculty of the University of Kansas School of Medicine.

== Early life and education ==
Samuel Ulysses Rodgers was born on August 10, 1917, in Anniston, Alabama, to Samuel Lee Rodgers and Lillie (née Thomas) Rodgers. His father was a physician, an influence that shaped his own career path. He pursued his undergraduate studies at Talladega College in Alabama, graduating with a degree in 1937. He then earned his medical degree from Howard University College of Medicine in Washington, D.C., in 1942. At the time, Howard University was one of only two medical schools in the United States that regularly admitted Black students.

== Career ==
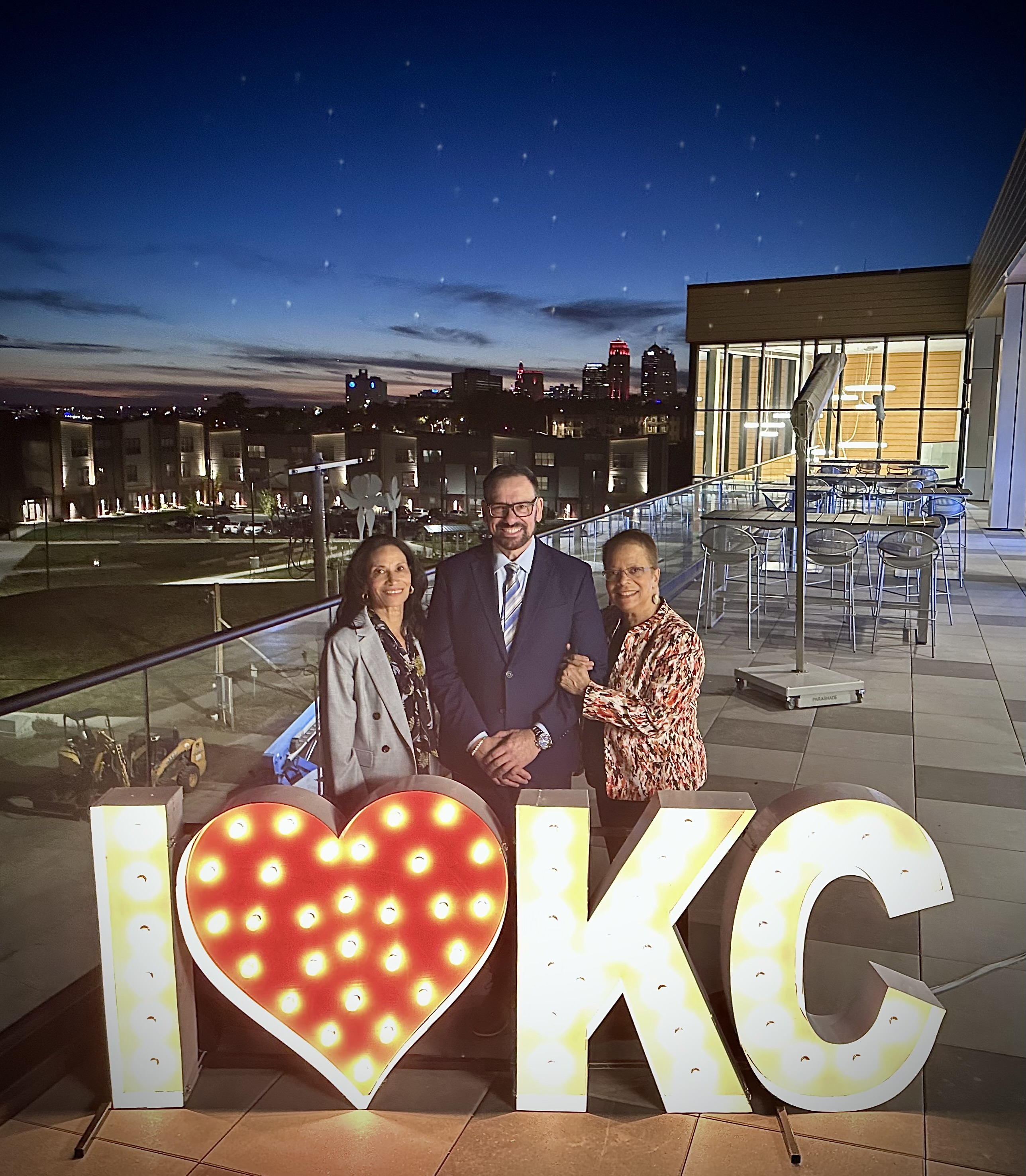
Rosalyn Rodgers Moore, CEO Bob Theis, and Dr. Rita Rodgers Stanley are on the balcony of the Samuel U. Rodgers Health Center. In the left background is the center's public housing complex, and above is the skyline of Downtown Kansas City. The daughters of Samuel U. Rodgers attended the launch of the pediatrics unit on November 7, 2025.

Rodgers began his career with an internship at General Hospital No. 2, Kansas City's segregated hospital for Black patients, in 1942. His internship was interrupted by military service during World War II, where he served in the U.S. Army Medical Corps from 1943 to 1947, ultimately reaching the rank of Major and earning a Combat Medical Badge. His experiences in the military, where he witnessed desegregated medical facilities, influenced his later advocacy for integrated healthcare.

After the war, he returned to Kansas City and began his obstetrics and gynecology residency at General Hospital No. 2 in 1947. He and other Black physicians experienced disparities in access to training and resources compared to their white counterparts. Rodgers advocated for improved conditions and training opportunities for Black medical professionals. These advocacy efforts culminated in a strike on January 30, 1947, when Rodgers and other Black doctors ceased accepting new patients, though continuing care for existing patients within the hospital. Contemporaneous reporting indicated the physicians' dissatisfaction with overwork, reliance on their own efforts to maintain quality of care, unqualified staff, lack of access to specialty training, and insufficient supplies. He became board-certified in obstetrics and gynecology, the fifth Black physician to do so in the nation.

In 1950, Rodgers and several colleagues established The Doctors Clinic, one of the first private practices for Black physicians in Kansas City. In 1954, he joined the University of Kansas School of Medicine as a faculty member and held positions public health, human ecology, and obstetrics and gynecology departments. In 1967, he earned a Master of Public Health degree from the University of Michigan. The following year, 1968, he helped establish and became the executive director at the Wayne Miner Health Center, a small clinic located in Wayne Miner housing projects designed to serve the healthcare needs of underserved residents.

Under his leadership, the Wayne Miner Health Center expanded its services to include a wide range of medical specialties, outreach programs, and social services. It became one of the models for the community health center movement, providing healthcare to low-income and marginalized populations. In 1988, the center was renamed the Samuel U. Rodgers Community Health Center in his honor.

== Personal life and death ==
Rodgers's first wife was Elizabeth Pullam, whom he met while serving in the Army. Elizabeth Rodgers died in 1985. Rodgers later married Mamie Hughes. He had three children.

Rodgers died on December 19, 1999, in Kansas City, Missouri.
