= Vonnie McLoyd =

American psychologist

- Education: Michigan (Ph.D., M.A.); Talladega College
- Awards: MacArthur Fellow (1996); Member of the National Academy of Sciences (2024)
- Scientific career
- Fields: Developmental psychology
- Workplaces: University of Michigan; UNC–Chapel Hill
- Thesis: The Effects Of Verbal Reinforcement And Induced Perceptions Of Causality On Intrinsic Motivation (1975)
- Doctoral advisor: Joseph Veroff

Vonnie Cile McLoyd is an American developmental psychologist known for her research on how poverty, parental job loss, unemployment, and work characteristics affect children's social emotional development. She is the Ewart A. C. Thomas Collegiate Professor of Psychology at the University of Michigan.

McLoyd was a 1996 recipient of a MacArthur Fellowship, in recognition of her work on the "interactive influences of race, ethnicity, family, and economic hardship on human development."

McLoyd received the American Psychological Foundation Gold Medal Award for Life Achievement in Psychology in the Public Interest in 2021 and the Urie Bronfenbrenner Award for Lifetime Contribution to Developmental Psychology in the Service of Science and Society from the American Psychological Association in 2022. In 2024, McLoyd was elected a member of the National Academy of Sciences.

== Life ==
McLoyd grew up in a middle-class family. Her mother was a school teacher and her father an Episcopal minister. She completed her undergraduate degree at Talladega College (1971) and her M.A. (1973) and Ph.D. (1975) at the University of Michigan and post-doctoral training at Stanford University. Her dissertation titled The Effects of Verbal Reinforcement and Induced Perceptions of Causality on Intrinsic Motivation was supervised by Joseph Veroff.

McLoyd joined the faculty at the University of Michigan in 1978. From 2002–2010, she was faculty at University of North Carolina, Chapel Hill before returning to University of Michigan. Her work was supported by a Faculty Scholars Award from the William T. Grant Foundation.

She was associate editor of the journals Child Development(1993-1996) and American Psychologist (2006-2016).

== Representative Publications ==
- McLoyd, V. C. (1983). The effects of the structure of play objects on the pretend play of low-income preschool children. Child Development, 54(3), 626-635. https://doi.org/10.2307/1130049
- McLoyd, V. C. (1998). Socioeconomic disadvantage and child development. American Psychologist, 53(2), 185–204. https://doi.org/10.1037/0003-066X.53.2.185
- McLoyd, V. C. (1990). The impact of economic hardship on Black families and children: Psychological distress, parenting, and socioemotional development. Child Development, 61(2), 311-346. https://doi.org/10.1111/j.1467-8624.1990.tb02781.x
- McLoyd, V. C., Cauce, A. M., Takeuchi, D., & Wilson, L. (2000). Marital processes and parental socialization in families of color: A decade review of research. Journal of Marriage and Family, 62(4), 1070-1093. https://doi.org/10.1111/j.1741-3737.2000.01070.x
- McLoyd, V. C., Jayaratne, T. E., Ceballo, R., & Borquez, J. (1994). Unemployment and work interruption among African American single mothers: Effects on parenting and adolescent socioemotional functioning. Child Development, 65(2), 562-589. https://doi.org/10.1111/j.1467-8624.1994.tb00769.x

== Books ==
- McLoyd, V. C.; Hill, N. E.; Dodge, K. A. (Eds.) (2005). African American Family Life: Ecological and Cultural Diversity. Guilford Press. ISBN 978-1-57230-995-1.
- McLoyd, V. C., & Steinberg, L. (Eds.). (1998). Studying minority adolescents: Conceptual, methodological, and theoretical issues. Psychology Press.
