= Errol Prisby =

American football player (1943–2006)

No. 25
- Position: Defensive back

Personal information
- Born: January 24, 1943; Ravenna, Ohio, U.S.
- Died: February 19, 2006 (aged 63); Kent, Ohio, U.S.
- Listed height: 5 ft 10 in (1.78 m)
- Listed weight: 184 lb (83 kg)

Career information
- High school: Kent (OH) Theodore Roosevelt
- College: Cincinnati

Career history
- Denver Broncos (1967)
- Stats at Pro Football Reference

Errol Prisby (January 24, 1943 – February 19, 2006) was an American football defensive back. He played for the Denver Broncos in 1967.

He died on February 19, 2006, in Kent, Ohio at age 63.
