= Mamie Currie Hughes =

American civil rights activist

- Born: 3 May 1929 (age 97); Jacksonville, Florida
- Monuments: Mamie Currie Hughes Memorial Bridge
- Education: Fisk University
- Spouses: Leonard Hughes (married 1949–?); Samuel U. Rodgers (married 1985)

Mamie F. Currie Hughes was born on May 3, 1929. In 1954 Mamie and her husband, Leonard Hughes, came to Kansas City, Missouri, and joined organizations to better the city. Mamie was a leading member of the local NAACP chapter along with other organizations that sought to improve conditions in Kansas City for the African American community. Mamie was regarded by some as "Kansas City's own 'godmother'."

Hughes had five children and three stepchildren.

Hughes remarried Samuel U. Rodgers.

== Education ==
Mamie Currie Hughes attended LaVilla Elementary School and Stanton Senior High School in Jacksonville, FL, where she graduated as salutatorian.

Hughes went on to graduate from Fisk University in May 1949 with a degree in mathematics. In 1960, Hughes became the president of the Greater Kansas City Fisk Club, an organization for alumni of Fisk University.

After moving to Kansas City, KS, with husband Leonard, Hughes earned a teaching certificate after taking courses at Kansas City University, St. Teresa's College, and the Metropolitan Community College.

== Career ==
Hughes started her career as a teacher, emulating her parents. She taught in the Kansas City, MO, Washington County, and Arcola, Mississippi school districts from 1951 to 1962. Her educational involvement also extended to volunteering with Head Start, serving as a board member to Help Educate Emotionally Disturbed Children ("HEED"), and providing foster care to children in need.

Hughes was the first African American woman to hold a position on the Jackson County, Kansas, governing board, serving as both a member of the county legislature and as chairperson of the Mid-America Regional Council. Hughes consistently worked with and advocated for projects in the Kansas City area that helped tear down racism and gender discrimination.

In 1978, Hughes was appointed to the federal volunteer service agency ACTION as the region VII director, where her work focused on community projects in the Kansas City region. Hughes administered 211 projects in the region, overseeing 20,000 volunteers across the projects. Hughes held this position until March 7, 1981.

Hughes worked for the Black Economic Union, eventually becoming president of the union.

In 1998, Hughes served in multiple volunteer positions: Founding and charter member of The Central Exchange, lifetime member of the NAACP, advisory board member of the Women's Foundation, advisory board member of the Friendship House, advisory board member of the Kansas City Community Gardens, board member of the Metropolitan Community College Fund, and member of the Women's Public Service Network.

During her career, Hughes served on various boards, including the Fair Housing Commission, the Kansas City Jazz Commission, the Voluntary Action Center, the Greater Kansas City Women's Coalition on Human Rights, the Kansas City Crime Commission, the DeLaSalle Education Center, the Planned Parenthood Board, the YMCA Urban Services, the Kansas City Habitat for Humanity, the Council on Education, and the Urban League Advisory Board.

=== Mamie Currie Hughes Memorial Bridge ===
Hughes worked as an ombudsperson for the Bruce R. Watkins Drive corridor bridge project while continuing to advocate for community connectedness. Hughes viewed this work as her biggest challenge, requiring navigating the tension between families living in the corridor for decades and the Missouri Department of Transportation. Upon completion, the bridge was named after Hughes in recognition of her years of work on this project and service to the city.

== Awards ==
March 6 was declared "Mamie Currie Hughes Day" by Kansas City, Kansas, Mayor Jack Reardon in recognition of her work with ACTION, where she "encouraged citizens to help make their neighborhoods, communities, and city a better place to live."

Hughes received the 1984 "Kansas City Career Woman of the Year" award from the Jones store Career club on April 18, 1984.

Hughes was named the "1998 Central Exchange Woman of the Year."

Hughes was granted the ATHENA Award from the Greater Kansas City Chamber of Commerce.

Hughes received the Hall of Fame Award from the Greater Kansas City Women's Political Caucus.

Hughes received the National Medal of Honor from the National Society of the Daughters of the American Revolution.

In 2019, Hughes was inducted into the Starr Women's Hall of Fame.
