= Celestine Smith =

American psychotherapist (1903–1975)

Celestine Louise Smith
- Born: May 31, 1903; Macon, Georgia, U.S.
- Died: December 19, 1975 (aged 72); Mount Holly, New Jersey, U.S.
- Education: Teachers College, Columbia University (EdD); Talladega College (BA)
- Occupations: Psychotherapist, administrator
- Employer: YWCA
- Known for: First trained African American Jungian psychoanalyst

Celestine Louise Smith (May 31, 1903 – December 19, 1975) was an American psychotherapist who became the first Black Jungian psychoanalyst, certified in 1964. As of 2017, she is the only African American woman to graduate from a Jung Institute. She also held various administrative positions at the YWCA.

== Life and career ==
Smith was born in 1903 in Macon, Georgia, to German Jewish father Fletcher Carol Smith (Schmitzen) and African American mother Viola Jane Smith. She received her bachelor's degree from Talladega College in 1925, a certificate in social work from the University of Southern California in 1942, and an EdD in marriage and family counseling from Teachers College, Columbia University, in 1952. Based on interviews with 75 Black adults in Manhattan, her 1952 doctoral dissertation was entitled An Exploration of Individual Need for Marriage and Family Life Education Among Urban Family Members. Later in life, she undertook religious and psychotherapy training at the Union Theological Seminary and the University of Chicago Divinity School.

After two years teaching high school in Florence, Alabama, Smith held various positions at the YWCA from 1929 to 1968. She worked as secretary of the YWCA in Little Rock, Arkansas, from 1927 to 1929. She was National Student YWCA secretary for the southwestern United States from 1929 to 1941, punctuated by a sojourn as director of the YWCA chapter in Lagos, Nigeria, from December 1934 to June 1935. She subsequently worked as the Los Angeles YWCA's director of counseling and casework from 1942 to 1946. After earning her doctorate, she became an administrative director of the Morningside Mental Hygiene Clinic, affiliated with the Church World Service, in New York City from 1949 to 1958. Smith returned to the National Student YWCA in 1958, working as a human relations specialist until her retirement in 1968. In retirement, she lived in Medford, New Jersey.

In 1964, Smith graduated from the C. G. Jung Institute of New York, becoming certified as the first African American Jungian psychoanalyst. In her later years, she ran a private practice. As of 2017, Smith is the only African American woman to have graduated from a Jung Institute.

Smith died in Mount Holly, New Jersey, on December 19, 1975, at the age of 72.
