= Paul Smith (clergy) =

American Presbyterian minister (born 1935)

Paul Smith (born September 20, 1935) is an American Presbyterian minister, mediator and civil rights activist known for creating multi-racial churches in Buffalo, St. Louis, Atlanta and Brooklyn, NY. Smith has been active in the civil rights movement since the 1950s. He has been an administrator, faculty member and trustee at seminaries and universities in St. Louis, Atlanta and New York City. He has served as a mediator and multicultural consultant to corporations and the government and has been active in organizations like the Urban League.

== Early life and education ==
Smith was born and raised in South Bend, Indiana. He was one of five children in a middle-class family. Smith went to integrated local schools and describes South Bend in the 1930-40s as racially moderate and multi-cultural. In 1952, Smith went south to attend Talladega College in Alabama. He earned an A.B. degree in Psychology and Religion in 1957.

In 1960, he married Frances Pitts, whom he had met at Talladega. Smith received his first seminary degree at Hartford Theological Seminary in that same year, and in 1978, he earned a Doctor of Ministry in Sociology and Religion at Eden Theological Seminary in Missouri. His dissertation focused on relations between black and Jewish college students.

== Pastorates and civil rights activism ==
After graduating from college in 1957, Smith introduced Andrew Young and Martin Luther King Jr. to each other and hosted the two speakers at a Talladega event sponsored by Alpha Phi Alpha, the black men's fraternity of which all three were members. Smith became a follower of both men and counts Young as a significant mentor in his life.

In 1960, Smith became the second black man ordained in the Evangelical and Reformed Church (now the United Church of Christ). After proving himself to a congregation of white, mostly German-speaking immigrants, he was called to lead their church, Salem United Church of Christ in Buffalo, New York. In 1964, he joined a white minister, the Rev. Carl Dudley, as co-pastor of Berea Presbyterian Church. Together, they helped to integrate the formerly black church in downtown St. Louis. Smith thereafter developed an inter-racial outreach program to other churches in St. Louis.

Answering Dr. King's call for clergy to join the protests, Smith and Dudley led a small group of St. Louis Presbyterian ministers to participate in the Selma to Montgomery marches in March 1965. Smith was spat upon by a white man, but the two otherwise escaped without injury.

From 1970 to 1978, Smith taught and worked with students on racial issues as an administrator at Washington University in St. Louis. While there, he rose to the rank of Associate Vice Chancellor. He also served as associate pastor at Second Presbyterian Church and helped coordinate a large Urban League antipoverty program. Smith then moved to Atlanta to become Vice President of Morehouse College. Smith began to teach a course in bioethics at Morehouse Medical School. He also taught at Atlanta's Columbia Seminary.

Smith was deeply influenced by Howard Thurman, the founder of the Church for the Fellowship of All Peoples, the country's first explicitly inter-racial and inter-cultural church. Smith has followed Dr. Thurman in seeking to engender intentionally diverse congregations. In 1979, Smith attracted media attention as far away as Los Angeles and Miami when he became the first black minister of all-white Hillside Presbyterian Church in Decatur, Georgia, outside Atlanta. Being a black Presbyterian pastor in an all-white church made Smith "unique among the more than 4,000 congregations of the Presbyterian Church in the US" at the time. Within three years, church membership swelled and become proudly multi-racial.

Smith left Atlanta in 1986, having been chosen from more than 100 candidates to lead historic First Presbyterian Church in Brooklyn Heights, New York. He became the 14th and first black pastor of a predominantly white church in existence since 1823. His friend, then-Mayor of Atlanta Andrew Young, gave the sermon at the installation service attended by more than 700 people. In addition to being explicitly multi-cultural and multi-racial, First Church under Smith's leadership also became more politically active and welcomed the gay and lesbian community.

Over a 20-year pastorate, Smith shared his pulpit with a wide range of clergy, elected officials and scholars including Professor Derrick Bell, the Dalai Lama, Mayor David Dinkins of New York and Marc Morial, now president of the National Urban League. While in Brooklyn, Smith taught at New York Theological Seminary and ran a sensitivity training program for the local precinct of New York City Police Department. In September 2002, Smith was introduced by Rep. Nydia Velázquez of New York and gave the opening prayer at the US House of Representatives in Washington, D.C. Dinkins gave a tribute at Smith's retirement service on June 25, 2006.

== Community health and pastoral care ==
Drawing on the theology of Howard Thurman as well as his own extensive pastoral experience, Smith has written Facing Death: The Deep Calling to the Deep. The book describes the end-of-life support he extended to tennis and civil rights champion Arthur Ashe, Dr. John Edson of Long Island College Hospital and Andrew Young's wife, Jean Childs Young, among others. In his memoir, Ashe wrote of his time with Smith.

Smith has been a trustee of academic and healthcare institutions including Long Island College Hospital, where he was chair of the Ethics Committee. He was a founding board member of the Arthur Ashe Institute for Urban Health, then affiliated with SUNY Downstate Medical Center. He has also served as a diversity consultant in the corporate world. Since his retirement, Smith continues to preach, mediate and mentor. He also advocates for end-of-life options for the terminally ill.
