= Cornelius Golightly =

American philosopher

Cornelius Lacy Golightly (May 23, 1917- March 20, 1976) was the first black president of the Detroit Board of Education. He was a teacher, civil rights activist, public intellectual, and educational administrator.

== Early life ==
Cornelius L. Golightly was born on March 23, 1917, in Waterford, Mississippi. His father, Reverend Richmond Mack Golightly, was from Livingston, Alabama. His mother, Margaret Fullilove was from Honey Island, Mississippi. Golightly was one of ten children.

== Education ==
In 1934, at the age of 17, Golightly joined Talladega College in Alabama, excelling both academically and in athletics. In 1938, he showcased his intellectual prowess by participating in the "Intellectual Olympics," organized by the New History Society in New York City. Out of all the black students nationwide, Golightly was one of five who received honors in the competition. Following his graduation from Talladega in 1938, he pursued philosophy at the University of Michigan, where he attained a Master's degree in 1939 and a PhD in 1941.

== Career ==
Golightly became an instructor of philosophy and social science at Howard University for the academic year 1942–1943. He was also the president of the Barnett Aden Gallery in Washington, D.C., during the same time. In 1943 he became a Compliance Analyst with the Fair Employment Practices Committee (FEPC). In 1945 he went back to academics, taking a post as an academic philosopher at Olivet College. This appointment, as a professor of philosophy and psychology, marks a turning point in history, as Golightly became the first black philosopher permanently hired to teach at a white institution during the 20th century. In 1949 he left Olivet in protest over restrictions placed on academic freedoms based on the perceived threats during the Cold War. Also in 1949, he became the first African American faculty member of the University of Wisconsin at Madison when he was hired to join the Philosophy department, where he continued to teach until 1955. At that time he moved to the University of Wisconsin in Milwaukee, where he stayed until 1969. At that time Golightly accepted an appointment as Associate Dean and Professor of Philosophy at Wayne State University in Detroit. This appointment made him the first African American to teach in the philosophy department of Wayne State.
