= Talladega College =

Private historically black college in Talladega, Alabama, U.S.

- Former name: Swayne School (1867–1869)
- Motto: An Education of Distinction
- Type: Private historically black college
- Established: 1867
- Affiliations: UNCF
- Religious affiliation: United Church of Christ
- President: Willie L. Todd, Jr.
- Students: 1,307 (fall 2020)
- Location: Talladega, Alabama, United States; 33°25′56″N 86°6′47″W
- Campus: Rural 50 acres (20.2 ha) main campus
- Colors: Crimson & Sky Blue
- Nickname: Tornadoes
- Sporting affiliations: NAIA – HBCUAC
- Mascots: Dear Ole' Dega, Dega, TC
- Website: www.talladega.edu

Talladega College is a private, historically black college in Talladega, Alabama. It is Alabama's oldest private historically black college and offers 17 degree programs. It is accredited by the Southern Association of Colleges and Schools.

== History ==
The history of Talladega College began on November 20, 1866, when two formerly enslaved men, William Savery and Thomas Tarrant of Talladega, met in a Freedmen's Bureau convention with a group of newly freed men in Mobile, Alabama. From this meeting came the commitment, "We regard the education of our children and youth as vital to the preservation of our liberties, and true religion as the foundation of all real virtue, and shall use our utmost endeavors to promote these blessings in our common country."

With this as their pledge, Savery, Tarrant, and a third freed man from the Talladega community, Ambrose Headen began in earnest to provide a school for the children of former enslaved members of the community. Their leadership resulted in the construction of a one-room school house using lumber salvaged from an abandoned carpenter's shop. The school overflowed with pupils from its opening and soon it was necessary to move into larger quarters.

Meanwhile, the nearby Coosa River Valley Baptist Academy, founded in 1852, was about to be sold under mortgage default. This building had been constructed using slave labor which included carpenter William Savery and laborers Thomas Tarrant, and Ambrose Headen. A speedy plea was sent to General Swayne for its purchase. Maj. Gen. Wager Swayne of the Freedmen's Bureau, was successful in getting the Freedmen's Bureau to commit to purchasing the land provided the American Missionary Association would buy the building and provide an organization structure for the new school. Eventually the building and the land were purchased for $23,000.

The AMA re-christened the college The Swayne School and it opened in November 1867 with about 140 pupils. It is remarkable that a building constructed before the American Civil War, constructed with slave labor, for the benefit of white students became the home of the state's first college dedicated to serving the educational needs of blacks. In 1869, Swayne School was issued a charter by the county and the school's named was changed to Talladega College by the Judge of Probate of Talladega County.

The former Coosa Valley Baptist Academy building, now known as Swayne Hall, has remained in service as the symbol and spirit of the beginning of the college.

Enrollment in 1909 included 21 men in the theology program; 20 men and 20 women in the college; 34 boys and 25 girls in high school college preparation; 2 boys and 55 girls in the high school normal program (for teachers); 63 boys and 86 girls in the grammar department (grades 6-7-8); 9 boys and 60 girls in the conservatory of music; 7 girls in nurse training; 20 men and 15 women in night school; and 142 boys and 228 girls in the Cassedy School (grades K to 5). The total enrollment was 797. Tuition ranged from 50 cents a month to $2.00 a month; room and board was $10.00 a month plus one hour a day of work. By 1937, total enrollment was 567, including 281 in the college and 120 in the high school.

In 1998, Marguerite Archie-Hudson became the first woman president and the first African-American woman to head a four-year college level institution in the history of the state of Alabama.

== Campus ==
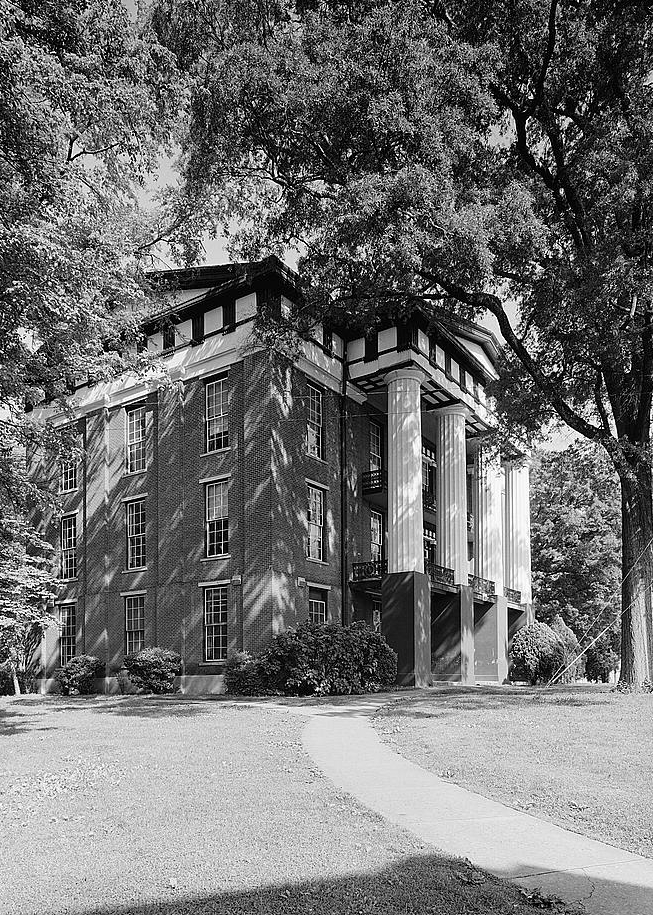
Built in 1857, Swayne Hall is the oldest building on campus. It was designated a National Historic Landmark on December 2, 1974.

Talladega College is located in the city of Talladega. The campus consists of 50 acres (200,000 m^{2}) with 17 primary buildings. 32 campus buildings are listed on the National Register of Historic Places as the Talladega College Historic District. The Savery Library, completed in 1939, was built to replace a 1907 structure built with a donation from Andrew Carnegie. The library houses hundreds of thousands of serials, a Record Room, a fully equipped computer laboratory, a unique Archives Room, and the historic Amistad murals painted by Hale Woodruff. Embedded in the floor of the library is a mural of La Amistad – which school tradition says must never be stepped upon – referring to the mutiny by slaves, who took control of that ship and later won their freedom in a United States court, is depicted upon the surrounding walls. The mezzanine floor of the library houses the Galangue Room. This room contains an extensive collection of Angolan and Nigerian artifacts.

Andrews Hall, built in 1910, houses the Music Department and the Education Department. It is named for George Whitfield Andrews, D.D., Dean of the Theological Department from 1875 to 1908.

Arthur D. Shores Hall, constructed in 1974, is named for the late attorney Arthur D. Shores, Class of 1927, who served for many years as a member and chairman of the College Board of Trustees.

De Forest Chapel was built in 1903 in commemoration of the life and service of the Rev. Henry Swift De Forest, D.D., President of the college from 1879 to 1896. DeForest Chapel was renovated in 1996 and rededicated November 1996. De Forest was the father of inventor Lee De Forest.

Dr. William R. Harvey Museum of Art was founded in 2014 and opened in 2020. The showcase piece of the collection is the Mutiny on the Amistad murals by Hale Woodruff.

Fanning Refectory was built in 1928 from a legacy of David H. Fanning of Worcester, Massachusetts. The building contains the student and faculty dining rooms.

Juliette Derricotte House, built in 1940–41, was the gift of the Harkness Foundation and named for Juliette Derricotte, Class of 1918, who at the time of her death in 1932 was a member of the Board of Trustees. Formerly a staff residence and guest house, it was converted into a women's honors dormitory in 1988.

Silsby Science Hall, constructed in 1926, was named for E. C. Silsby, who was a member of the college faculty for 37 years. The building was a gift of the General Education Board and friends and alumni of the college. It contains the laboratories and classrooms for the Natural Sciences and Mathematics.

The Dr. Billy C. Hawkins Student Activity Center completed in 2020, was named after the 20th president of Talladega College. The 47,000 square-foot state-of-the-art facility includes a 2,000-seat gymnasium, dining hall, full kitchen, concession stand, coffee lounge, convenience store, fitness area, and multipurpose rooms.

== Undergraduate admissions ==
Talladega College has an open admission policy, admitting all applicants so long as certain minimum requirements are met. For 2024, Talladega College's enrolled students had an average 2.4 high school GPA. No SAT or ACT scores were reported.

== Rankings ==
Academic rankings

Regional
- U.S. News & World Report: 72 (tie)

In 2026, U.S. News & World Report ranked Talladega College tied for No. 32 out of 125 Regional Universities South, tied for No. 29 in Historically Black Colleges and Universities, tied for No. 4 in Regional Universities South Top Performers on Social Mobility, and No. 1 in Best Value Universities in the South.

== Athletics ==
The Talladega athletic teams are called the Tornadoes. The college is a member of the National Association of Intercollegiate Athletics (NAIA), primarily competing in the HBCU Athletic Conference, formerly the Gulf Coast Athletic Conference (GCAC), since the 2023–2024 academic year. They also competed in the HBCUAC from 1999–2000 to 2001–0 and from 2011–12 to 2020–21. The Tornados previously competed in the Continental Athletic Conference from 2008–09 to 2010–11 and the Southern States Athletic Conference (SSAC; formerly known as Georgia–Alabama–Carolina Conference [GACC] until after the 2003–04 school year) from 2021–22 to 2022–23.

Talladega competes in 16 intercollegiate varsity sports: Men's sports include baseball, basketball, cross country, soccer and track & field (indoor and outdoor); while women's sports include basketball, cross country, soccer, softball, track & field (indoor and outdoor) and volleyball; and co-ed sports include competitive cheer and competitive dance. Former sports included men's & women's golf (1978–2005), football (1909–1943), and women's gymnastics (2023-2024)

=== Marching band ===
The Talladega College Tornado Marching Band (The Great Tornado) was established in 2012. The marching band is the largest organization on campus, with over 200 members. The band is led by five drum majors and is accompanied by a danceline named "Dega Diamonds". The marching band made their debut appearance at the annual Honda Battle of the Bands in 2015 and performed at the 2017 U.S. presidential inauguration parade in Washington, D.C. The band has also performed halftime for the New Orleans Saints in 2016, 2017, & 2021. In 2024, the band performed at the London's New Year's Day Parade on January 1st.

== Notable alumni ==
Name	Class year	Notability	Reference(s)
Marguerite Archie-Hudson	1958	California State legislator, President of Talladega College	
George Ruffin Bridgeforth	1894	agriculturist, faculty at Tuskegee Institute, first Black alumnus of UMass Amherst	
Jewel Plummer Cobb	1947	biologist, cancer researcher, college dean, California State University, Fullerton president	
George Williamson Crawford		Yale Law School honors graduate, lawyer, city official, and judge in New Haven, Connecticut	
Nikky Finney		author who won the 2011 National Book Award for Poetry, Head Off & Split	
William R. Harvey	1961	12th president of Hampton University	
Karla F.C. Holloway	1971	cultural studies, law, and literature scholar and author. Duke University Dean Emerita and Hastings Foundation Fellow. Michigan State University PhD 1978 in English and linguistics	
Cornelius Golightly	1938	philosopher, educator, activist	
Sherman A. James	1964	epidemiologist and Susan King Professor Emeritus of Public Policy at Duke University. elected to National Academy of Medicine in 2000. Washington University PhD in Psychology 1973	
Honorée Fanonne Jeffers	1996	poet and writer	
Eunice Johnson	1938	founder and director of the Ebony Fashion Fair	
Theodore K. Lawless		dermatologist, medical researcher, and philanthropist	
Wynona Lipman	~1944	first African American woman elected to the New Jersey Senate	
Herman H. Long	1935	educator who served as president of Talladega College and president of the United Negro College Fund	
Gladys McCoy	~1958	first African American elected to public office in Oregon	
Vonnie McLoyd	1971	developmental psychologist University of Michigan PhD 1975, faculty, and named MacArthur Foundation "Genius Grant" Fellow 1996.	
William Pickens	1902	orator, educator, journalist, and essayist; wrote two autobiographies, The Heir of Slaves in 1911 and Bursting Bonds in 1923	
Barbara Gardner Proctor	1954	American advertising executive. In 1970 she founded Proctor and Gardner Advertising, Inc.	
Willard Ransom	1936	attorney, businessman, community civic leader, and a civil rights activist in Indianapolis, Indiana	
Samuel U. Rodgers	1937	physician, educator, and public health advocate	
Deion Sanders	2020	NFL Hall of Famer, TV personality, and collegiate football coach	
Hank Sanders	1967	civil rights attorney and current Alabama State Senator	
Arthur Shores	~1934	civil rights attorney who was considered Alabama's drum major for justice	
Celestine Smith	1925	first African American psychoanalyst trained in Jungian psychology	
Rev. Paul Smith	1957	first African American minister at the historic First Presbyterian Church of Brooklyn, New York; multicultural consultant, civil rights activist, educator, author	
Celestine Smith	1925	first African American psychoanalyst trained in Jungian psychology	
Lucille Whipper		South Carolina state representative and College of Charleston administrator	
Nikema Williams	2000	US congresswoman for Georgia District 5, Chair of the Georgia Democratic Party	
Margaret Bush Wilson	1939	attorney, civil rights advocate, first African American woman to Chair National NAACP Board of Directors (1975–1983)	
