= Casey Kriechbaum =

American music teacher, author and composer

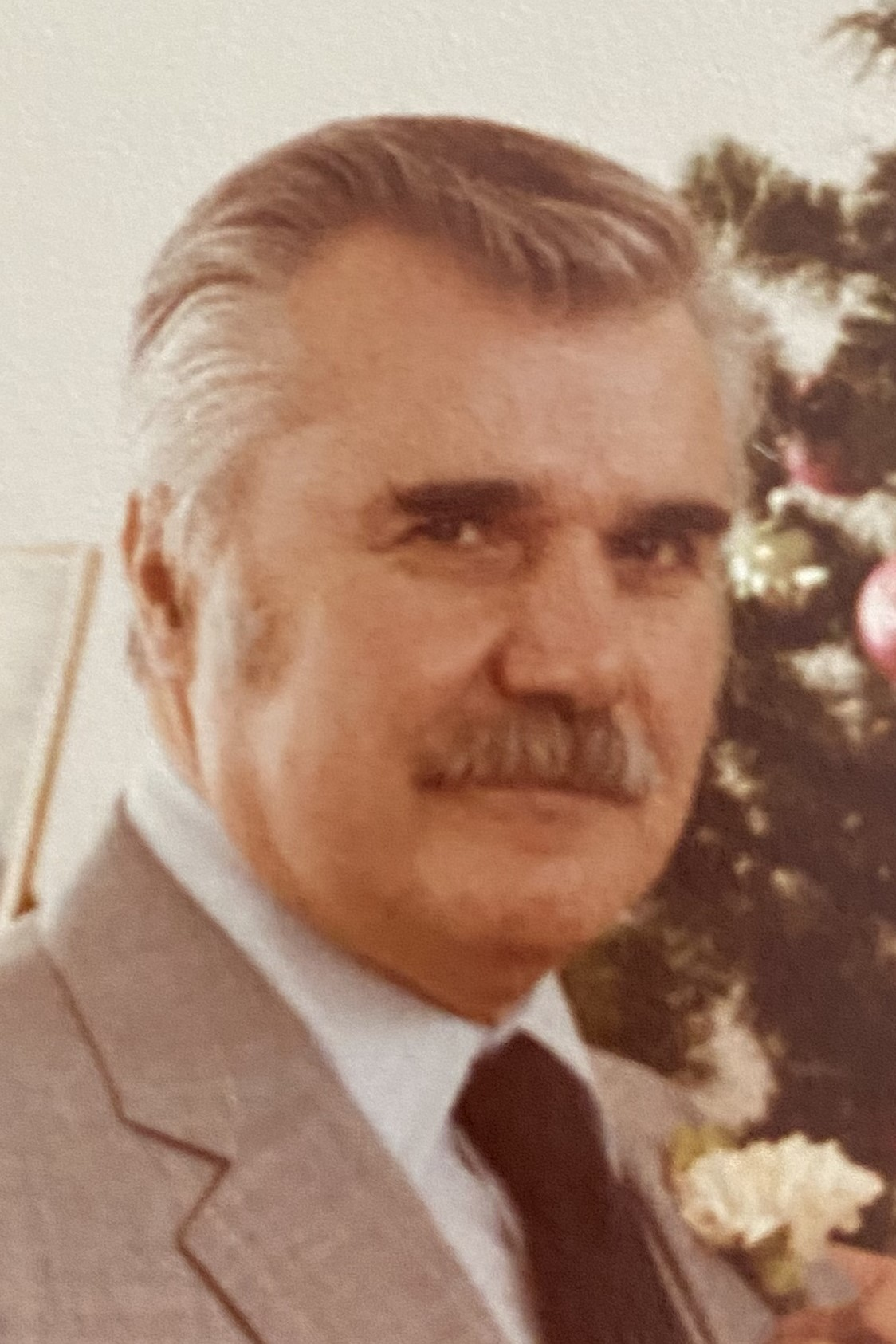
- Born: Casimer Bauman Kriechbaum; August 12, 1923; Cleveland, Ohio, U.S.
- Died: February 5, 1991 (aged 67)
- Education: Baldwin Wallace College (BME); Case Western Reserve University (MA)
- Occupations: Music teacher; composer; author
- Years active: 1948–1980
- Known for: Starting the Instrumental Music Program at North Olmsted High School
- Spouse: Dorothy King (m. 1944; died 2017)
- Children: 4

Casey Kriechbaum (1923–1991) was an American music teacher, author and composer. He started the instrumental music program at North Olmsted City Schools in North Olmsted, Ohio in 1948. He wrote a book that is used at colleges to teach methods for successful orchestra string programs, and wrote several compositions for school orchestras.

== Early life ==
He was born Casimer Bauman Kriechbaum in Cleveland, Ohio on August 12, 1923. He graduated from the old West High School. While in high school, he won a national solo competition playing the trumpet. Kriechbaum spent three years in the United States Army Air Corps during World War II. After his service he attended Baldwin Wallace College to receive his Bachelor of Music Education (BME) degree, and Case Western Reserve University, where he earned his (MA). While at Baldwin Wallace College, he led a dance band called "Music by Casey."

== Career ==
Kriechbaum began his teaching career in the North Olmsted City Schools, where he started the instrumental music program in 1948. The school had a small orchestra as far back as 1930, but Kriechbaum staged the first concert band and marching band in 1950. In 1955, while serving as director of the band, the group began participating in Ohio Music Education Association (OMEA) band contests. His groups earned 24 superior ratings at district contest and 16 superior ratings at state contest. By 1967, the band grew to national prominence and was invited to play at the OMEA Convention in Columbus, Ohio, and the Music Educators National Conference (MENC) North Central Division in Detroit, Michigan. The concert was recorded by Jack Renner (recording engineer) at Century Records. Between 1966 and 1979, the orchestra earned 10 superior ratings at OMEA state competitions.

In 1970, the North Olmsted band and orchestra auditioned for the Midwest Clinic International Band and Orchestra Conference in Chicago, Illinois. For the first time, both the band and orchestra from the same school were invited to perform. In 1976, the band was invited to play at the OMEA convention in Columbus, Ohio. Also, both the band and the orchestra were invited to perform at the MENC 26th Biennial Meeting in Chicago in 1978.

Entry March Of The Gladiators, North Olmsted High School Band 1973

Vinyl records were made each year by the band and orchestra. The Best Of C.B. Kriechbaum captures favorites from the 1960s and 1970s. Entrance of the Gladiators was performed in 1973. Additional music from this album has been posted on YouTube and listed under External Links.

Many of the students from the North Olmsted High School bands and orchestras went to college for music and became successful teachers, composers and musicians. It is not possible to list them all, but a few notable people include James Akins (tubist), Jack Boss, Robert Chappell, Steven Cseplo, and Christine Haff. His former students, including non-music majors, attribute their success, in part, to his ability to inspire and achieve at the highest level.

In 1979, after a 31-year career in the North Olmsted City Schools, Kriechbaum was appointed to the faculty at Ashland College in Ashland, Ohio to be director of the college band.

Over the years, Kriechbaum conducted week long summer workshops for teachers at Interlochen Center for the Arts in Michigan. Sponsored by Scherl and Roth, he traveled the United States, Canada and Germany conducting clinics for teachers. Also, he was a director at Eastern Kentucky University Summer Camp, served as a judge at both at the district and state level, and was a guest conductor at festival bands and orchestras.

== Personal life ==
Kriechbaum was married to Dorothy King in 1944. He resided in North Olmsted and had four children. His hobbies included woodworking and furniture-making. He built his home in North Olmsted and a summer home on Kelleys Island. In his spare time he directed several church choirs in the Cleveland area and a band at NASA.

He died in 1991 at age 67 after a long illness with Parkinson's disease.

== Awards and recognition ==
Kriechbaum was inducted into the Ohio Band Director's Conference (OBDC) Pioneer Hall of Fame in 2008.

== Books ==
In 1978, Kriechbaum published a book titled "How to Design and Teach a Successful School String and Orchestra Program" that has been used by colleges to train future music teachers. The book was the first detailed "how-to" guide for music educators to teach string instruments even if they had no direct string experience. The book was "a welcome addition to the growing number of recent publications dealing with public school string and orchestra programs."

== Music ==
Kriechbaum wrote several compositions for school orchestras. Petite Tango and Boca Grande are popular compositions for younger orchestras. They were both selected as among "the most significant works for Orchestra and String Orchestra ever composed for Grades 1 through 3." Numerous schools have posted performances on YouTube.

He also composed an arrangement of Georges Bizet's Prelude to Carmen that has been performed by orchestras throughout the world.
