= Olmsted Township, Cuyahoga County, Ohio =

Township in Ohio, US

- Township
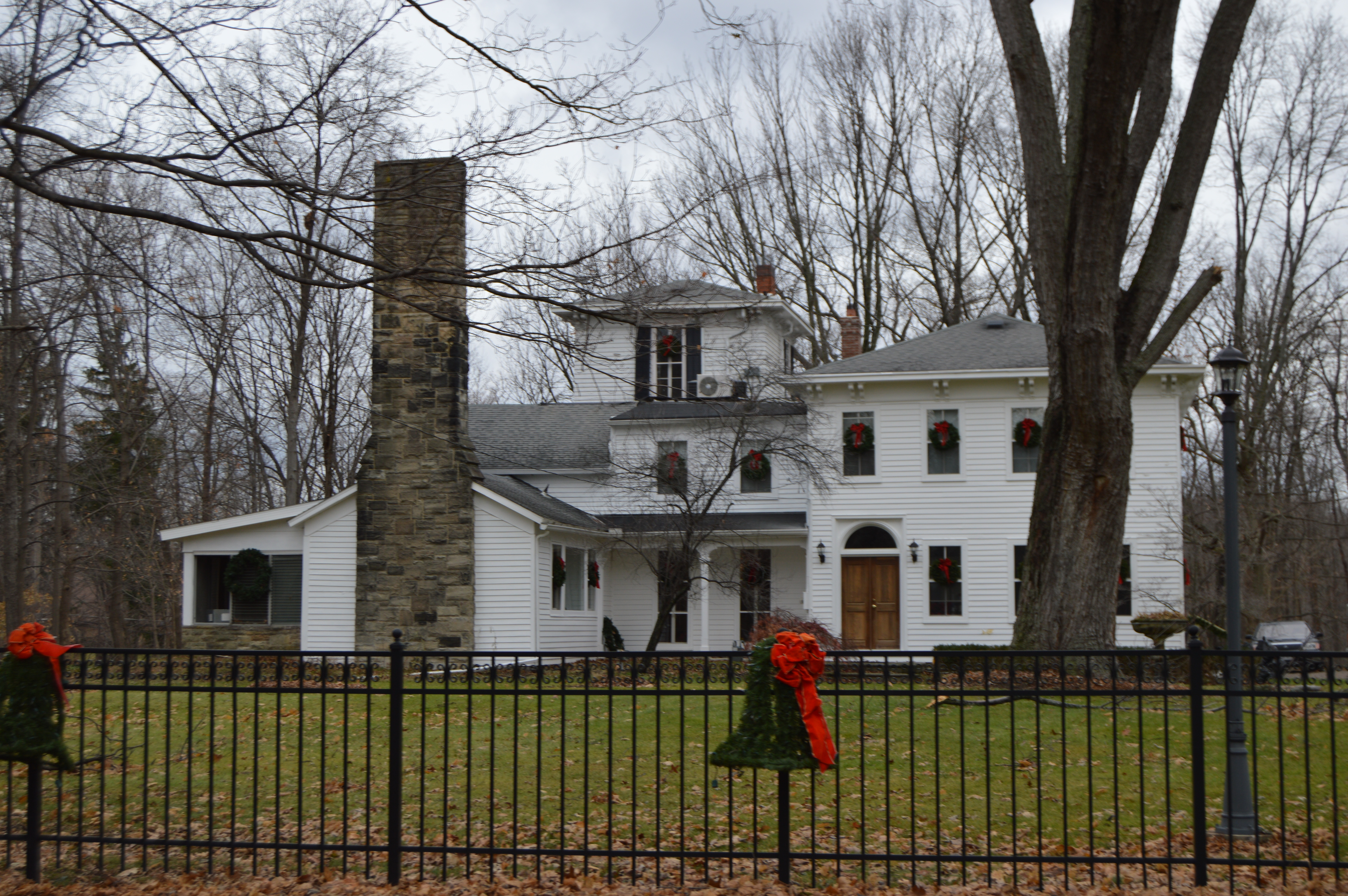
- John and Maria Adams House on Columbia Road

- Location in Cuyahoga County and the state of Ohio.

- Location of Ohio in the United States
- Coordinates: 41°22′50″N 81°55′17″W
- Country: United States
- State: Ohio
- County: Cuyahoga

Area
  - Total: 10.0 sq mi (25.9 km^{2})
  - Land: 10.0 sq mi (25.9 km^{2})
  - Water: 0 sq mi (0.0 km^{2})
- Elevation: 781 ft (238 m)

Population (2020)
  - Total: 14,506
  - Density: 1,450/sq mi (560/km^{2})
- Time zone: UTC-5 (Eastern (EST))
  - Summer (DST): UTC-4 (EDT)
- Postal code: 44138
- Area codes: 440, 216
- FIPS code: 39-58408
- GNIS feature ID: 1085988
- Website: https://www.olmstedtownshipohio.gov/

Olmsted Township is a township located in Cuyahoga County, Ohio, United States. Situated in the southwest end of the county, Olmsted Township is a west side suburb of Cleveland, and a part of the even larger Greater Cleveland area. As of the 2020 Census, Olmsted Township had a population of 14,506. It is one of only two civil townships remaining in Cuyahoga County (the other being Chagrin Falls Township), and the only Olmsted Township statewide.

== Geography ==
Located in the western part of the county, it borders the following cities and townships:

- North Olmsted - Cuyahoga County - north
- Olmsted Falls - Cuyahoga County - southeast, west of Berea
- Berea - Cuyahoga County - southeast, east of Olmsted Falls
- Brook Park - Cuyahoga County - northeast
- Columbia Township - Lorain County - south
- Eaton Township - Lorain County - southwest corner
- North Ridgeville - Lorain County - west

According to the United States Census Bureau, the township has a total area of 10.0 sq mi. All of the area consists of land, and none of it is covered with water.

Olmsted Township, is a part of the Cleveland-Elyria-Mentor Metropolitan Statistical Area which in 2010 had a population of 2,077,240. Olmsted Twp. is also part of the larger Cleveland-Akron-Elyria Combined Statistical Area, which in 2010 had a population of 2,780,440.

== History ==
After the Revolutionary War, the area that later became Olmsted Township was part of the Western Reserve, a strip of northeastern Ohio land stretching 120 miles west from the Pennsylvania border, that was claimed by Connecticut. In 1795, Connecticut sold most of that land to the Connecticut Land Company, which then divided it into townships and sold it by auction. Several bidders won the right to purchase what then was known as Township 6, Range 15, with the largest share of almost half going to Aaron Olmsted, a sea captain from East Hartford, Connecticut. However, it took years for the sales to be consummated. Olmsted died in 1806, so when the sale of his land was completed in 1807, it went to his widow and three sons, who sold parts of the land to settlers.

Although James Geer, who then lived in Columbia Township to the south, planted a crop of corn across the border in 1814, it was 1815 when he and his family moved into a small log house in Township 6, Range 15, to become the township’s first settlers. The township had several informal names, including Kingston, until 1823, when it was organized as a civil township called Lenox. However, because of confusion with another Lenox Township in Ashtabula County, one resident suggested renaming it Olmsted Township in honor of Aaron Olmsted. Olmsted’s son, Charles Hyde Olmsted, not only agreed to the request but was so pleased that he offered to send the community about 500 books from Connecticut by oxcart. Those books became known as the Oxcart Library.

On April 7, 1856, Olmsted Falls was incorporated as a village from a portion of east-central Olmsted Township. In 1857, the village doubled in size when it annexed Plum Creek, the unincorporated hamlet to the north. Olmsted Falls subsequently annexed other parts of Olmsted Township over the years. In 1909, the northern part of Olmsted Township and part of southern Dover Township incorporated as North Olmsted. In 1927, Westview (also known as West View) was incorporated as a village from the southeastern portion of Olmsted Township. In 1971, Olmsted Falls and Westview merged under the name Olmsted Falls. Over the years, Berea, Brook Park and North Olmsted also have annexed portions of Olmsted Township land.

Railroad tracks, originally built in 1853 and now owned by Norfolk Southern, cut east-west through the township.

Olmsted Township is part of the Olmsted Falls City School District, which also includes Olmsted Falls and parts of Berea and Columbia Township.

Vitamix has its world headquarters in Olmsted Township right on the border with Olmsted Falls.

== Government ==
The township is governed by a three-member board of trustees, who are elected in November of odd-numbered years to a four-year term beginning on the following January 1. Two are elected in the year after the presidential election and one is elected in the year before it. There is also an elected township fiscal officer, who serves a four-year term beginning on April 1 of the year after the election, which is held in November of the year before the presidential election. Vacancies in the fiscal officership or on the board of trustees are filled by the remaining trustees. As of 2025, the board was composed of Riley A. Alton, Tom Cole, and Lisa Zver and the fiscal officer was Brian Gillette.
