= First Universalist Church of Olmsted =

Historic church in Ohio, United States

- First Universalist Church of Olmsted / Olmsted Unitarian Universalist Congregation
- U.S. National Register of Historic Places
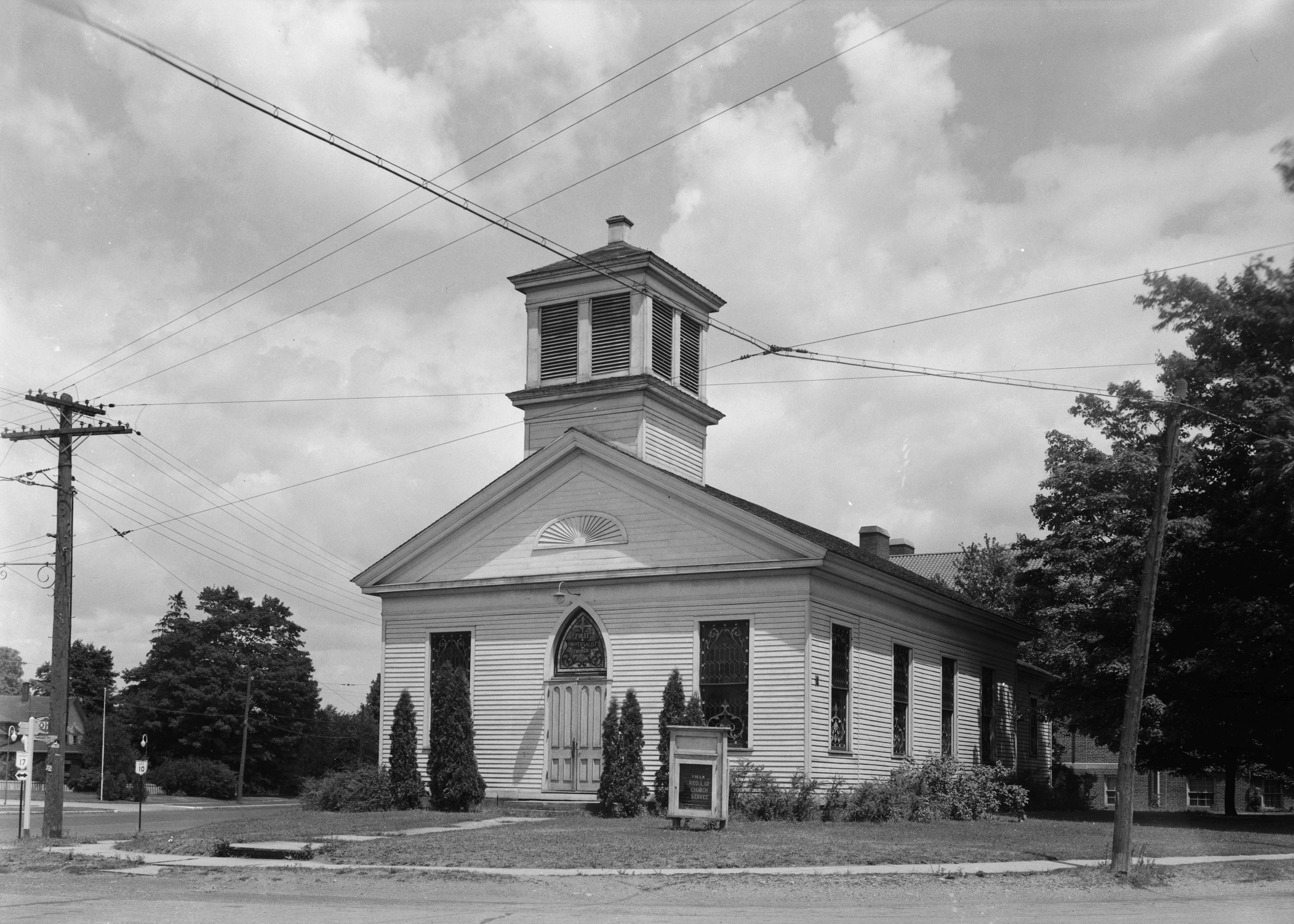
- Front and northern side

- Location within Ohio Location within the United States
- Location: 5050 Porter Rd., North Olmsted, Ohio
- Coordinates: 41°24′58.5″N 81°55′44″W
- Area: 1.3 acres (0.53 ha)
- Built: 1847
- Architect: John Ames
- Architectural style: Greek Revival
- NRHP reference No.: 80002983
- Added to NRHP: November 25, 1980

The First Universalist Church of Olmsted is a historic Unitarian Universalist church in the city of North Olmsted, Ohio, United States. The second-oldest church building in Cuyahoga County, it has been a community landmark since the middle of the nineteenth century, and it was officially named a historic site in the late twentieth.

North Olmsted's Universalists erected their church building in 1847, employing a Greek Revival design under the direction of John Ames. The building is a simple rectangle of frame; covered with weatherboarding, the walls rise to a gable with a bell tower atop the roofline at the front of the building. Four rectangular windows pierce the sides, while one such window sits on either side of the front, framing the main entrance. Above the entrance is a short ogive window, while the entirety of the gable is constructed as a pediment. The pediment is the building's most decorative portion, due to components such as its detailed fanlight. The church's current bell is more than 150 years old, having been installed in 1851. Overall, the building is a simple version of the Greek Revival style, although some Victorian details were added later, and the church has been moved from its original site.

Members of the congregation have long been known for their liberal religious views; they appointed their first female preacher, Abbie Danforth, in 1878. Conversely, their architectural views are highly conservative; St. John's Episcopal Church, erected in 1838, is the county's only extant religious building that predates the North Olmsted Universalist Church. This lack of change was significant to the building's designation as a historic site. In November 1980, the church was listed on the National Register of Historic Places, qualifying both because of its historically significant architecture and because of its place in local history, even though neither churches nor moved buildings are generally considered eligible for addition to the Register. It is one of nine sites in and around North Olmsted and Olmsted Falls, along with John and Maria Adams House, Fort Hill, the Grand Pacific Hotel, the Samuel Lay House, the North Olmsted Town Hall, the Julia Carter Northrop House, the Olmsted Falls Depot, and the Olmsted Falls Historic District.
