= Oxcart =

Oxcart or ox cart can mean:

- Bullock cart, a cart pulled by oxen
- CIA codename for the program to produce the Lockheed A-12 reconnaissance aircraft

See also:

- Ox-Cart Library
- Ox-Cart Man
- Red River ox cart
