= John and Maria Adams House =

- U.S. National Register of Historic Places
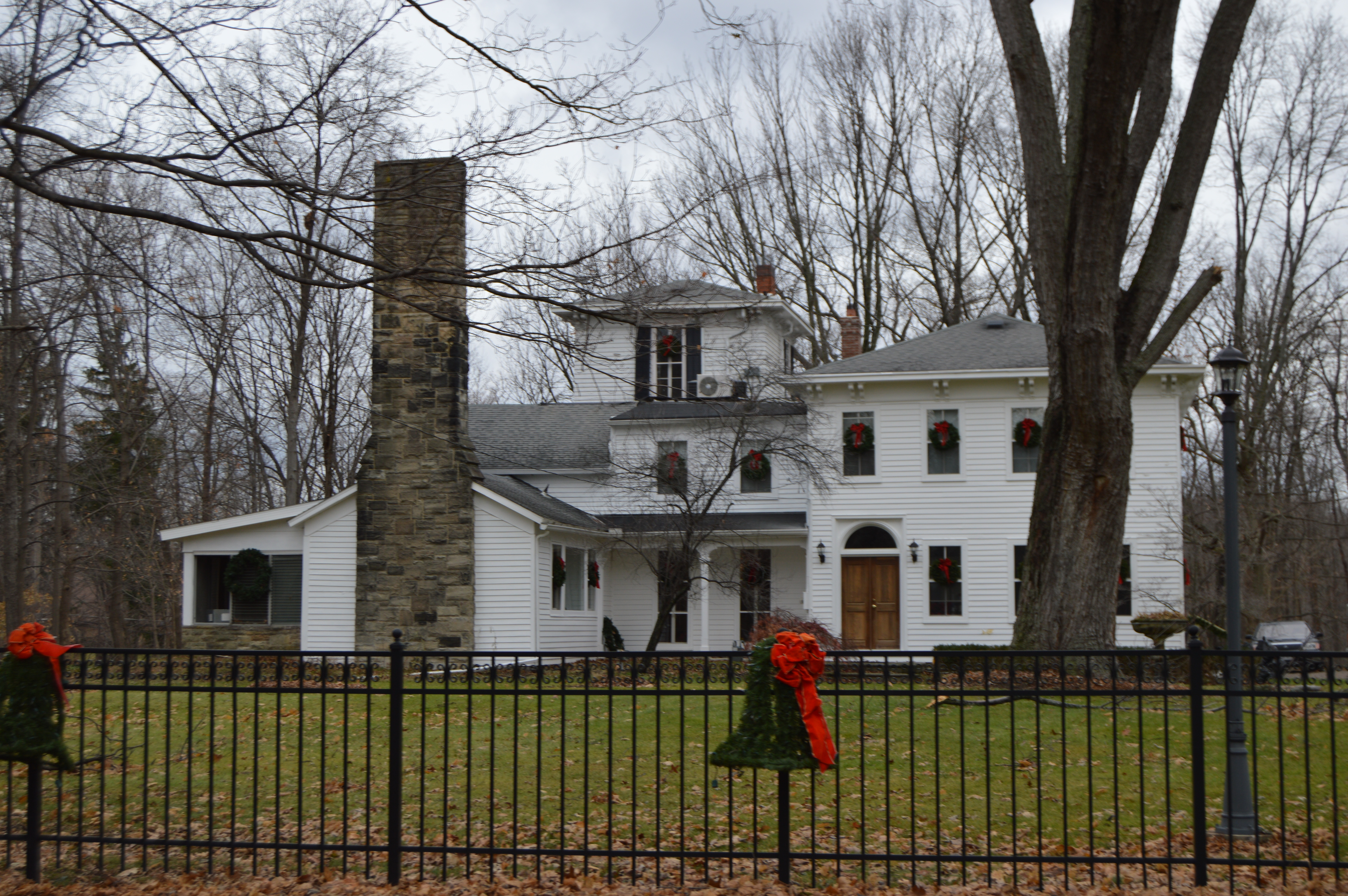
- Southern side

- Location within Ohio Location within the United States
- Location: 7315 Columbia Rd., north of Olmsted Falls, Ohio
- Coordinates: 41°23′4″N 81°54′9″W
- Area: 1 acre (0.40 ha)
- Built: 1820
- Architect: Arthur P. Gray
- Architectural style: Italianate, Italian Villa
- NRHP reference No.: 75001368
- Added to NRHP: October 10, 1975

The John and Maria Adams House is a historic structure near the city of Olmsted Falls, Ohio, United States. Built in the early nineteenth century, the house was expanded throughout the following several decades, and it has been named a historic site.

Lemuel Hoadley of Waterbury, Connecticut brought his family to present-day Cuyahoga County in the 1810s; they were among the first settlers of Nelson Township, which took its present name of Olmsted Township in 1830. Another early resident, John Adams, married Maria Hoadley in 1820, and the oldest part of the present house was built in the same year. Multiple additions were constructed later in the century while it was the home of Olmstead Falls postmaster Arthur P. Gray. Beginning in the 1930s and continuing into the 1970s, the house was the property of a family named TeGrotenhuis, whose ancestors were part of an old New England family.

Despite its early construction date, just six years after the arrival of the area's first settlers, the partially stone Adams House is built in the Italianate style, which is much more commonly found in buildings from the later part of the century. However, the stylistic elements, including components as large as the house's tower, were entirely absent from the original building; the Italianate portions of the house were all built as part of the expansion during Arthur Gray's time as owner.

In 1975, the Adams House was listed on the National Register of Historic Places, qualifying both because of its historically significant architecture and its place in local history. It is one of nine National Register-listed locations in and around Olmsted Falls and North Olmsted; only Fort Hill was designated earlier.
