= I-X Center =

Convention center in Cleveland, Ohio

International Exposition Center
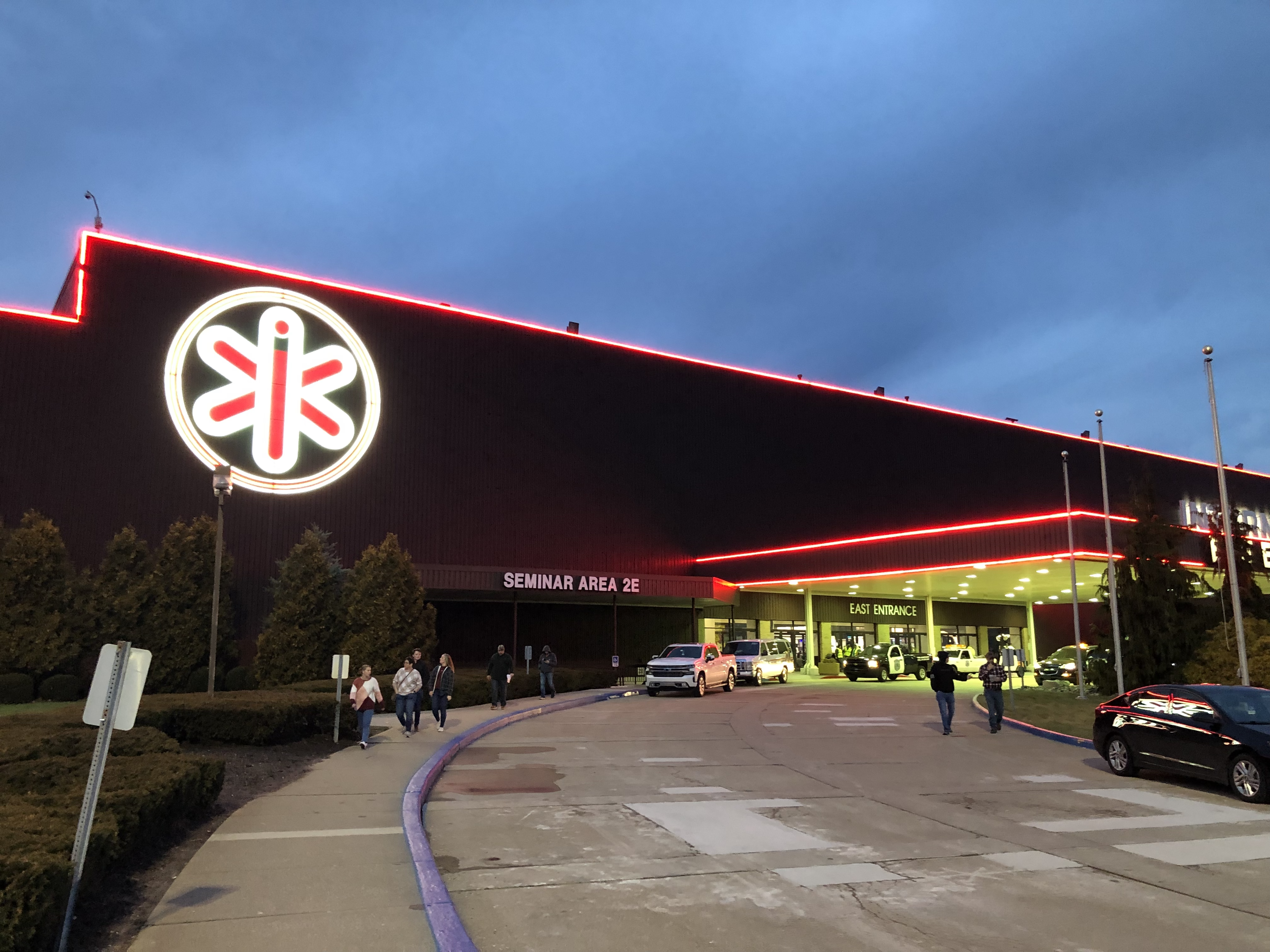
- Interactive map of International Exposition Center
- Address: One I-X Center Drive; Cleveland, Ohio 44135
- Coordinates: 41.39850°N 81.85312°W
- Owner: City of Cleveland
- Operator: Industrial Realty Group

Construction
- Built: 1942
- Opened: 1985

Website
- ixcenter.com

The International Exposition Center, better known as the I-X Center, is a convention and exhibition hall located in the Hopkins neighborhood of Cleveland, Ohio, United States, adjacent to Cleveland Hopkins International Airport. The 2,200,000-square-foot (200,000 m^{2}) building includes over 1,000,000 square feet (93,000 m^{2}) of exhibition and conference space, making it one of the largest meeting, convention, and exhibition centers in the United States. The diverse show schedule has included public events featuring one of the country's largest boat shows, trade shows, banquets and meetings attracting over 2 million visitors each year.

Originally located within Brook Park, Ohio, the building and 90 acres (36 ha) of neighboring land became part of Cleveland in a 2001 land swap that sent most of the NASA Glenn Research Center to Brook Park.

== History ==
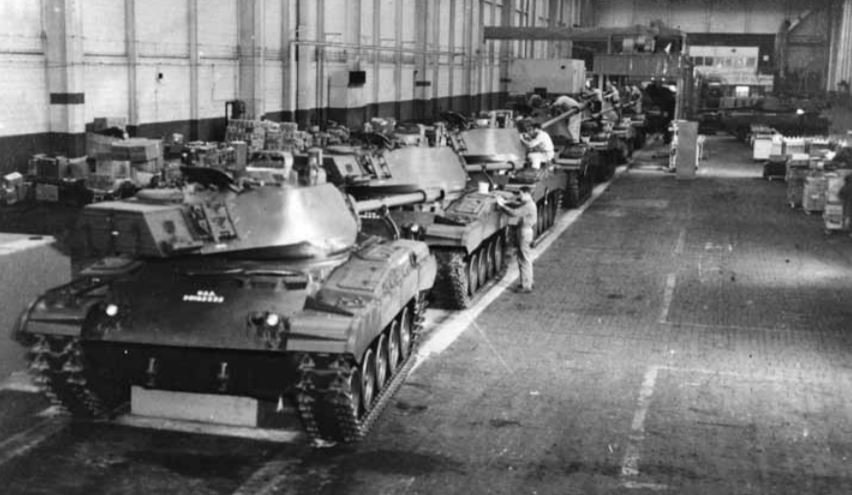
M41s on the assembly line at the Cleveland Tank Plant, the Cadillac factory where they were manufactured from 1951 to 1954.

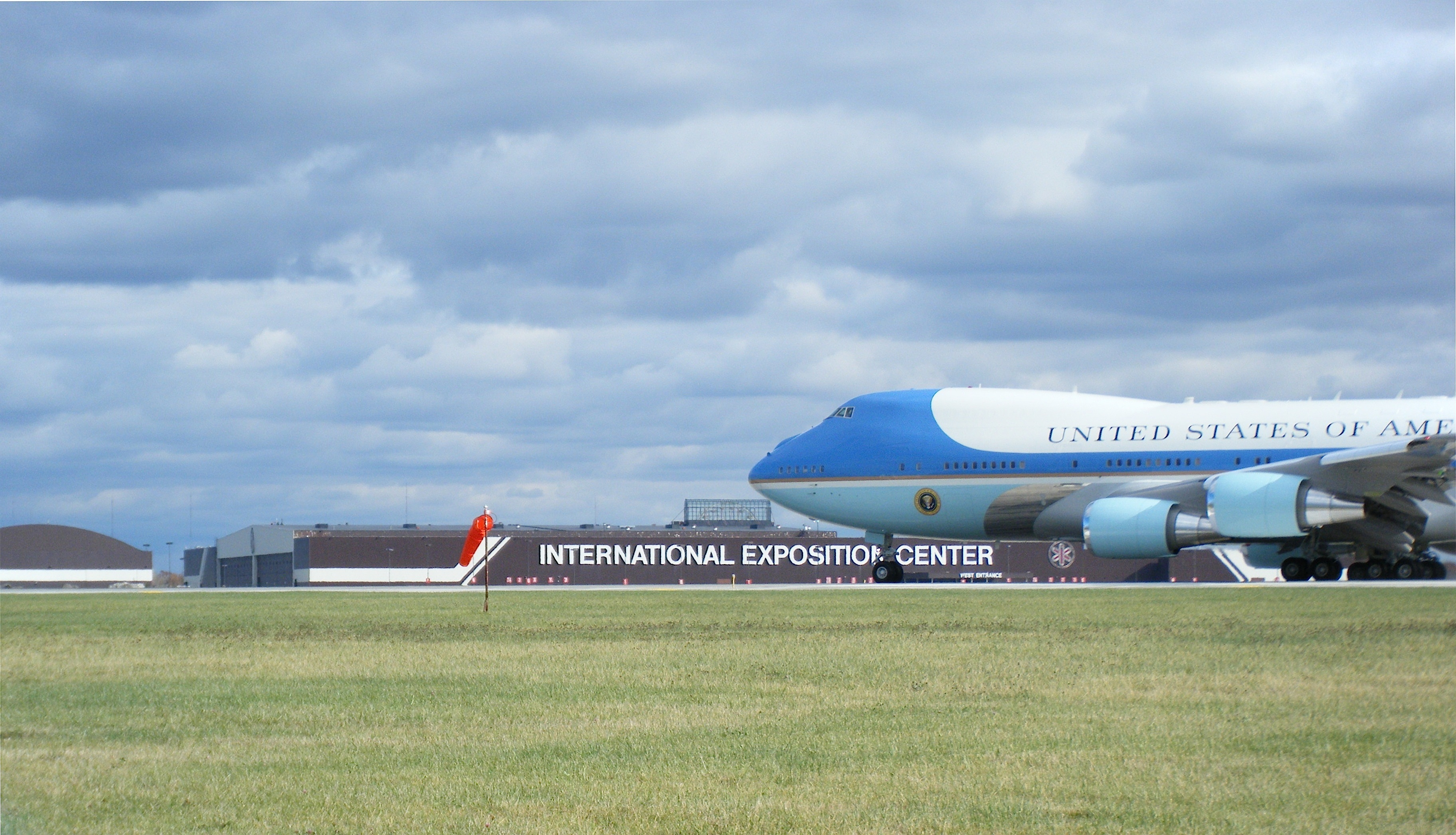
Air Force One passing in front of the I-X Center

It was built in 1942 as a General Motors-operated factory, Fisher Aircraft Plant 2, and was supposed to build bombers during World War II as the Cleveland Bomber Plant. For a time, it built the wing assembly for the B-29 Superfortress, then the experimental XP-75.

It later served for many years as a tank factory. The M41 Walker Bulldog, M56 Scorpion, M114 armored fighting vehicle, the MOG Howitzer, and the M551 Sheridan were built at the facility. Former employees of the tank plant reported that there were at least two, maybe three basement levels. One basement had a large pool in it for testing water-tightness of production tanks.

It was vacant from 1970 to 1977, when it was purchased by Park Corp. with the intention of converting it into an exhibition hall. It re-opened in 1985 as the I-X Center. The Park Corp. sold the building to the City of Cleveland in 2001, but continued to lease and operate it until 2021.

In 1990, the I-X Center was used as a temporary home for North Olmsted High School. On September 16, 1990, two students had set fire to the front of the high school, causing significant damage.

A 2008 expansion added 185,000 square feet (17,200 m^{2}) of exhibition space, increasing the exhibition floor to 985,000 square feet (91,500 m^{2}). The entire ceiling was repainted for the first time since 1984, using 27,000 gallons of paint.

On May 3–4, 2014, the I-X Center hosted the first Pro Football Hall of Fame Fan Fest, which featured appearances by 100 NFL Hall of Famers including Jim Brown, Joe Namath, Barry Sanders, Lynn Swann, Marshall Faulk, Franco Harris, Warren Sapp and Terry Bradshaw. The successful campaign to bring the event to the I-X Center was spearheaded by Cleveland native Tony Gumina. The center also hosted the National Sports Collectors Convention seven times.

In September 2020, the operator, the I-X Center Corporation announced that the facility would close at the end of 2020 due to the COVID-19 pandemic. Gojo Industries leased a portion of the building for inventory storage. The organizers of the Cleveland Boat Show sued the I-X Center Corporation, seeking to have a receiver oversee the company's finances, but later withdrew their suit and opted to pursue mediation. In August 2021, Industrial Realty Group (IRG) acquired the stock of I-X Center Corporation and announced plans to reopen and redevelop the facility. They plan to reallocate part of the interior space.

The Cleveland Crunch indoor soccer team began playing home games at the IX Center in the 2022–23 season.

A 2025 plan for a "Fortune 100" company to move into the I-X Center fell through in 2026. Exhibitors had already begun to announce their final shows at the facility, and as of June 2026 no exhibition had taken place since March 2026. In June 2026 the city of Cleveland anticipated a "major manufacturer" moving into the I-X Center in 2027. In August 2026 the I-X Center announced that it would begin hosting trade shows again.

=== Ferris wheel ===
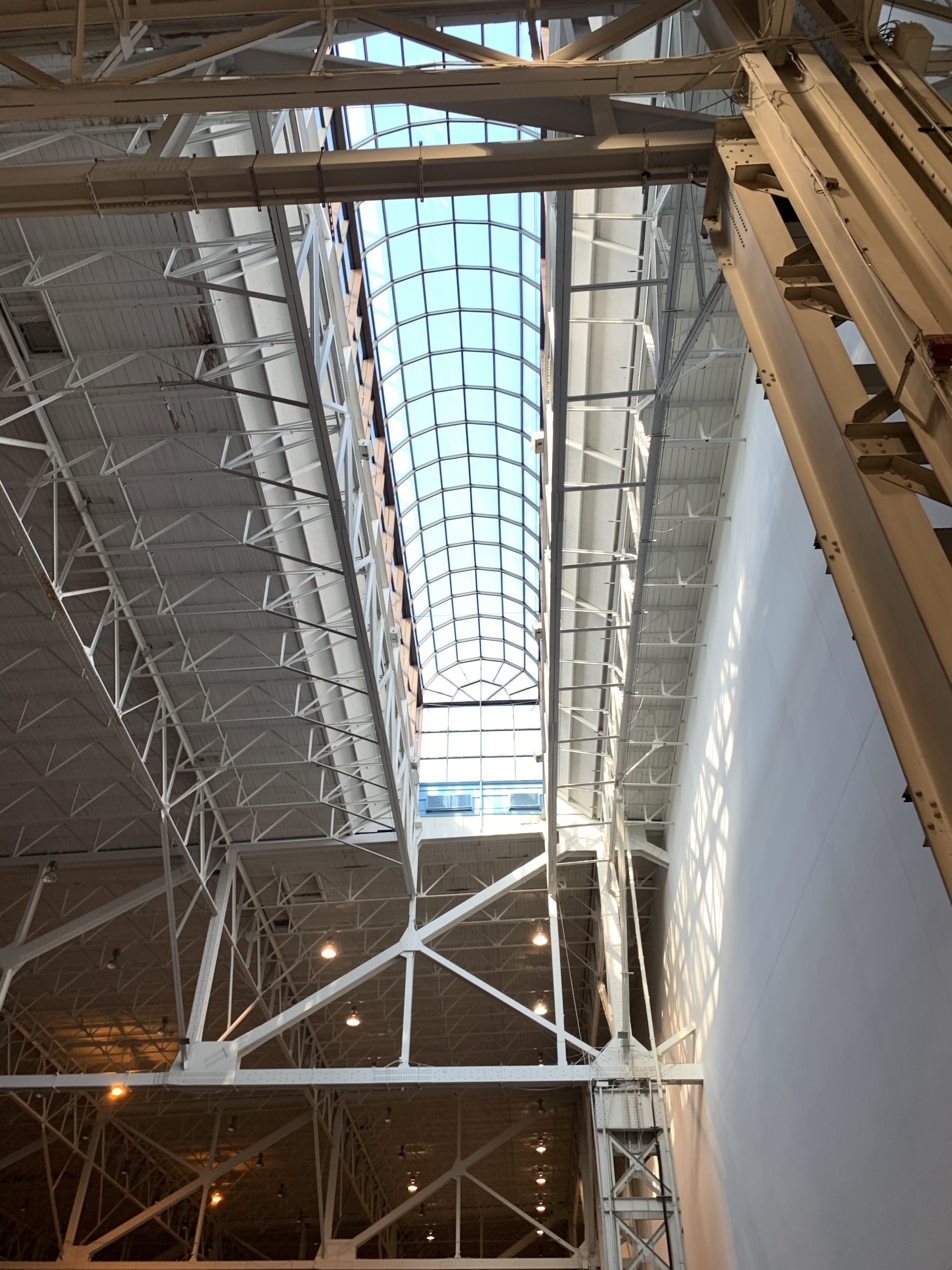
Skylight for the former ferris wheel, since removed

The building's 125-foot (38 m) tall Ferris wheel was a centerpiece of the annual I-X Indoor Amusement Park. It premiered at the 1992 Greater Cleveland Auto Show, at which time it was the world's tallest indoor Ferris wheel. The top of the wheel was enclosed in a glass atrium and rose approximately 35 feet (11 m) above the main roof. It usually did not operate during trade shows. IRG stated that they would remove it but would attempt to find another maintainer for it. In April, it was announced that the Hall of Fame Village development in Canton would buy and install the Ferris Wheel and zipline there. The Ferris Wheel was removed in June 2022 and reopened as the Red Zone wheel in the Hall Of Fame Village in March 2023. The wheel went up for sale in 2026.
