= North Olmsted High School =

Public, coeducational high school in North Olmsted, Ohio, United States

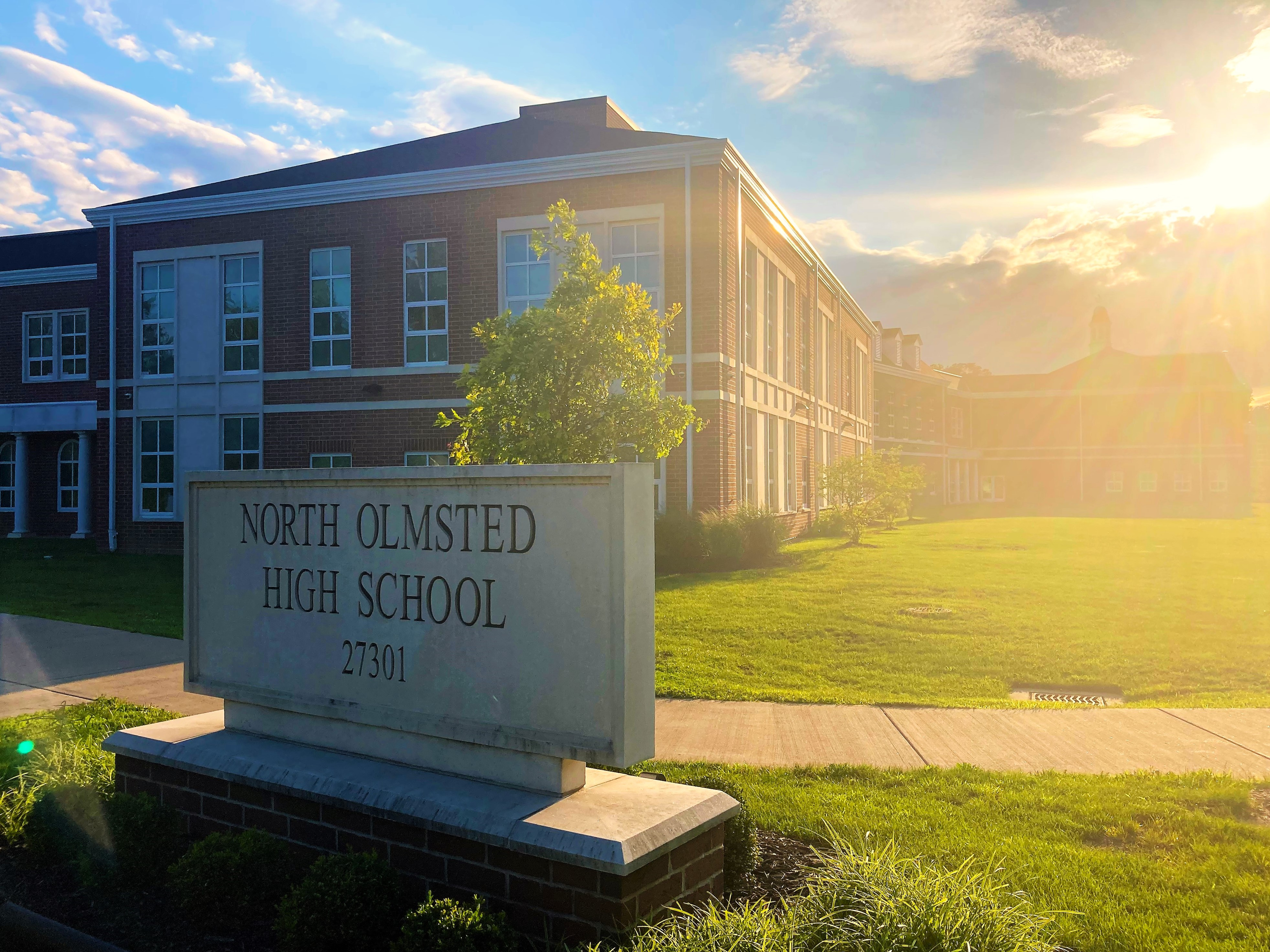

Location
- 27301 Butternut Ridge Road; North Olmsted, (Cuyahoga County), Ohio 44070; United States
- Coordinates: 41°24′21″N 81°55′30″W

Information
- Type: Public, Coeducational high school
- School district: North Olmsted City Schools
- Superintendent: David Brand
- Principal: Daniel P. Flood
- Teaching staff: 58.79 (FTE)
- Grades: 9-12
- Enrollment: 1,145 (2023-2024)
- Student to teacher ratio: 19.48
- Colors: Orange and Black
- Fight song: On Wisconsin
- Athletics conference: Cleveland West Conference
- Sports: Football, Soccer, Wrestling, Hockey, Volleyball, Cross Country, Track and Field, Basketball, Tennis, Baseball, Softball, Swimming/Diving, Golf, Gymnastics, Bowling
- Mascot: Eagle
- Team name: Eagles
- Rival: Olmsted Falls High School
- Yearbook: The Nohian
- Website: School website

North Olmsted High School is a public high school that is located in the Cleveland suburb of North Olmsted, Ohio. It is the only high school administered by the North Olmsted City School District.

== Athletics ==
=== State championships ===
- Boys' soccer: 1977, 1985, 1996, 1999

== Clubs and teams ==
NOHS had a small orchestra as far back as 1930, but Casey Kriechbaum started the instrumental program in 1948 and staged the first concert band and marching band in 1950. Alongside the band are the NOHS Eaglets, or cheerleaders. As of 2020 a drama club called the Eagle's Nest Theatre performs twice a year in fall and winter. Student participation in news and announcements is encouraged through the Eagle News Network. A computer club is also present, as is a team for the U.S. National Chemistry Olympiad, sponsored by the American Chemical Society. A math team competes in the Ohio Mathematics League Contests and the American Mathematics Competition. There is also a ski club, as well as French and Spanish clubs.

The school also has a boys football, soccer, cross-country, basketball, golf, hockey, bowling, wrestling, swim, baseball, tennis, and track team. They have a girls soccer, volleyball, golf, tennis, basketball, bowling, swimming, dance, gymnastics, cheer, softball, and track team.

== Notable events ==
On September 16, 1990, two juveniles broke into the school and vandalized it, leaving a burning cigarette near an overturned oil lamp, leading to a fire that caused over $3 million in damage to the building. As a result of the fire, classes were temporarily relocated to the I-X Center, an exhibition center in nearby Cleveland.

On October 13, 2020 a football player on the boys football team tested positive for COVID-19. The School District subsequently pulled out of the state playoffs, and canceled all remaining games and practices.

== Notable alumni ==
- Tony Gardner, Designer and special effects makeup artist
- Thom Hatch, author and historian
- Jennifer Lyn Jackson, Playboy playmate
- Scott Medvin, Former MLB player (Pittsburgh Pirates, Seattle Mariners)
- Daniel S. Papp, Kennesaw State University President
- Adam Russell, Pitcher for the Tampa Bay Rays MLB
