= North Olmsted City School District =

School district in Ohio, United States

Address
- 26669 Butternut Ridge Road North Olmsted, Ohio, 44070; United States
- Coordinates: 41°24′41.21″N 81°55′32.27″W

District information
- Type: Public
- Motto: Partnership, Excellence, Citizenship, Scholarship
- Grades: PK–12
- Schools: 6
- NCES District ID: 3904452

Students and staff
- Students: 3,539 (2024–2025)
- Teachers: 194.84 (on an FTE basis) (2024–2025)
- Staff: 568.90 (on an FTE basis) (2024–2025)
- Student–teacher ratio: 18.16 (2024–2025)
- Colors: Orange and Black

Other information
- Website: www.northolmstedschools.org

The North Olmsted City School District is the public school district that serves the city of North Olmsted, Ohio, United States. As of 2005, 4,573 students attended its nine schools. The North Olmsted City School colors are orange and black. The mascot is the Eagle. The school's fight songs are Miami U (from the University of Miami, Florida), On Wisconsin and War Eagle from Auburn University.

== Awards and report card ==
The School District passed a levy on February 6, 2007, the fifth attempt after four previous failures. 4,077 votes were cast for the Levy and 3,383 votes were cast against the Levy.

Despite levy problems, North Olmsted High School continues to be awarded "Excellent" status on its school report card meeting 12 out of 12 state indicators for the 2006–2007 school year, as well as 2005–2006, 2004–2005, and 2003–2004.

Birch, Butternut, Forest and Spruce elementary schools also earned "Excellent" status for the 2006–2007 school year. Chestnut, Maple, Pine and the North Olmsted Middle School earned "Effective" status for the 2006–2007 school year.

== Schools ==
The school district administers a number of schools.

North Olmsted High School is the city's sole high school, and consists of grades 9 through 12. Enrollment for the 2007–2008 school year was approximately 1,600.

North Olmsted Middle School is the city's sole middle school and consists of grades 7 through 8. In 2015, the middle school relocated to Korab Hall, a building leased from St. Richard Catholic Church in preparation for the demolition of the old middle school buildings in advance of the construction of a $90 million combined middle school and high school. The building had previously been used by St. Richard School, which had closed two years earlier for financial reasons. The new campus is scheduled to open for the 2018–2019 school year.

Elementary education is provided by elementary schools such as Chestnut and Maple serving grade 1-3, Pine serving grade 4-5 and Birch serving only Pre-K students. A former primary school, Butternut, was closed in 2016 and converted into administrative offices and a bus transportation center.

== Notable alumni ==
The following notable individuals attended North Olmsted City Schools:

- Thom Hatch, author and historian
- Jim Tocco, baseball broadcaster
- Adam Russell, Pitcher for the Tampa Bay Rays (MLB)

== See also ==
- List of school districts in Ohio
