= Randy Wood (artist) =

Randy Wood was born in 1970, at Hill Air Force Base, Utah and grew up in North Olmsted, a suburb of Cleveland, Ohio. He is an artist and performer who currently lives in Seattle, Washington.

His comics and illustrations have appeared in numerous publications including The Stranger and the Anchorage Press. His paintings and installations have been shown around the US and Canada at such places as the Henry Art Gallery, Grand Central Art Center, and Aqua Art Miami. He was a member of the Seattle artist-run gallery SOIL from 2001 to 2011.
