= Ox-Cart Library =

Library in Ohio, United States

Coordinates: 41°24′49″N 81°55′33″W

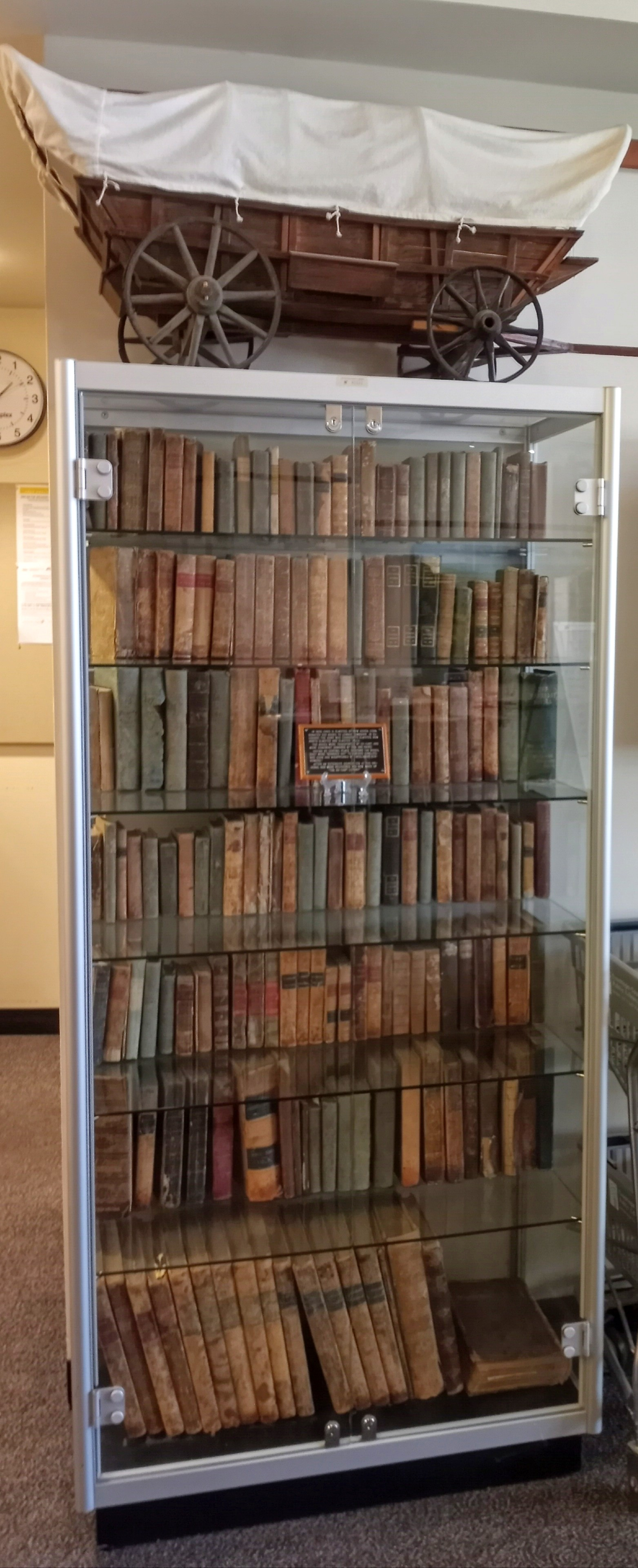
Ox Cart Library Collection

The Oxcart Library is a non-circulating library located in the North Olmsted branch of the public library in the city of North Olmsted, Ohio, United States, the first in the Western Reserve.

== Origin ==
Captain Aaron Olmsted, a wealthy sea captain in the China trade out of New England, was one of 49 investors who formed a syndicate in 1795 to purchase a major part of the Western Reserve from Connecticut. He became the owner of thousands of acres from his $30,000 share of the $120,000 total land deal. The land encompassed the areas now known as North Olmsted, Olmsted Falls and Olmsted Township. At the time of the purchase, the area was known as Lenox. Olmsted traveled west on horseback to visit the land in 1795, but never settled here. He died in 1806.

In 1826, Aaron's son, Charles Hyde Olmsted, offered to donate 500 books from his father's personal collection in Oxford, Connecticut, if the residents of Lenox agreed to change the name of the area to Olmsted, which they did.

The books traveled by oxcart over 600 miles of rugged terrain. They were individually covered with blue paper and arrived partly stained with mud and rain. The books were housed in various families' homes and circulated to residents in the area.

== The collection today ==
Just over 100 of the original books can be found on display in the North Olmsted Branch of the Cuyahoga County Library. The blue paper covers remain on many of the books. The following books comprise the remaining collection:

American Antiquities, and Discoveries in the West/ Josiah Priest. Printed by Hoffman and White: Albany, NY 1833.

American Conflict: A History of The Great Rebellion in the United States of America, 1860-'65, v.2/ Horace Greeley. O. D. Case and Company: Hartford, CT. Not dated.

The Arabian Nights Entertainments, Consisting of One Thousand and One Stories in Two Volumes - Volume I /Sultaness of the Indies. Charles Gaylord: Boston, MA 1835.

The Atoning Sacrifice, A Display of Love - Not of Wrath; 2nd Edition/Noah Worcester. Hilliard and Brown: Cambridge, MA 1830.

Ballou's Sermons on Important Doctrinal Subjects/Hosea Ballou. Trumpet: Boston, MA, 1832

Beauties of the Botanic Garden/Dr. Erasmus Darwin. D. Longworth: New York, NY 1805.

Biography of Henry Clay/George D. Prentice, Esq. Samuel Hanmer, Jr. & John Jay Phelps: Hartford, CT. 1831.

Clarke's Travels, Part One: Russia, Tartary, and Turkey/Clarke, Edward Daniel. L.L.D.

Faye & Co., New York 1813.

Clarke's Travels, Part Two, v.1 Europe, Asia, and Africa.

Clarke's Travels, Part Two, v.2 Europe, Asia, and Africa

Compend of Geology/Le Conte, Joseph. American Book Company: New York, Chicago, and Cincinnati. 1898.

Compendium of Natural Philosophy/ Denison Olmsted, A. M., Hezekiah Howe & Co.: New Haven, CT 1833.

Consolations in Travel, or The Last Days of a Philosopher/ Sir Humphry Davy, Bart. Late President of the Royal Society. John Grigg (?): Philadelphia, PA 1830.

The Constitution of Man Considered in Relation to External Objects/George Combe. Marsh, Capen & Lyon: Boston. 1835.

The Crayon Miscellany, No 1/ attrib.Washington Irving, author of the "Sketch Book" Carey, Lea, & Blanchard: Philadelphia, PA. 1835.

Crofton Boys/Harriet Martineau. D. Appleton & Co. New York, NY, not dated.

A Description of Pitcairn's Island: with an Authentic account of the Mutiny of the ship Bounty/Anon. J&J Harper, New York. 1832.

The Dignity of Human Nature/James Burgh. James Oram: New York, NY, 1812.

Discourses/William Ellery Channing. Charles Bowen: Boston, 1832.

Dramatic Works of William Shakespeare. v1, v.4, v.8. Collins & Hannay: New York, 1822.

Eleven Sermons/Hosea Ballou. Edwin T. Scott: Boston. 1822.

An Essay of the Causes of Variety of Complexion and Figure in the Human Species/Samuel Stanhope Smith, D.D. L.L.D. J. Simpson & Co. and Williams and Whiting: New-Brunswick, 1810.

Family Library Series/J.A. St. John. K & J Harper: New York, 1832.

Chivalry and the Crusades. V. 20

Life of Nelson V.6.

Lives of Celebrated Travelers. V.40

British Poets in Two Volumes v. 1. V. 112

Williams’ Life of Alexander the Great. V.7

The Freedom of the Mind, Demanded of American Freemen/Samuel Nott, Jun. Crocker & Brewster: Boston, MA. 1830.

A General View of the Manners, Customs, and Curiosities of Nations, v.1/Rev. J. Goldsmith. John Babcock and Son: New Haven CT, 1825.

Great Events by Great Historians (Subtitled The School Library Vol. XVII./ (Anon.) Marsh, Capen, Lyon, and Webb: Boston, MA 1840.

Greece in 1823 and 1824/Colonel Leicester Stanhope. A. Small, E. Parker, Marot& Walter, and E. Littell: Philadelphia PA, 1825.

Hall's Voyage to the Eastern Seas: An account of a voyage of discovery to the west coast of Corea; and the Great Loo Choo Island/Basil Hall. Abraham Small: Philadelphia, PA, 1818.

Helen (?). (No Title Page. "Helen" appears at the top of each page.)/attrib. Maria Edgeworth. No publisher information or location available.

Historical Account of the Most Celebrated Voyages, Travels, and Discoveries, From the Time of Columbus to the Present Period,v.1, v.5, v.10 /Mavor, William. E. Newbery: London, UK 1797.

History of Popery/Rev. Anthony Gavin. Case, Tiffany, and Burnham. Hartford.

History of Popery, Part 1. 1845

History of Popery, Part 2. 1846

History of the Rebellion in Scotland in 1745 and 1746, v.1- v.2/Robert Chambers. E.C. Mielke: Philadelphia, PA 1833.

Influence of Literature on Society, v.1/Germaine de Stael-Holstein. W. Wells and T.E. Wait & Co.: Boston. 1831.

Inquiries Concerning the Intellectual Powers and the Investigation of Truth/John Abercrombie, M.D. J.&J. Harper: New York, NY, 1832

The Journal of a Mission to the Interior of Africa in the year 1805 /Mungo Park. Edward Earle: New York, 1815.

Journal of a Tour Through Malta, Greece, and Asia Minor: Carthage, Algiers, Port Mahon and Spain/Samuel Woodruff, Esq. Cooke and Co.: Hartford, CT. 1831.

A Journey Through Persia, Armenia, and Asia Minor to Constantinople/James Morier, Esq. M. Carey and Wells and Lilly: Philadelphia, PA. 1806.

A Journey to the Shores of the Polar Sea/John Franklin. Missing title page.

Lawrie Todd(?)/John Galt(?). (Cover illegible and no Title Page. "Lawrie Todd" appears at the top of each page.)

Lay of an Irish Harp; Or Metrical Fragments./ Miss Owenson. E. Sargeant, D. Longworth, George Jansen, Alsop, Brannan & Alsop, Matthias Ward, E. Duyckinck, J. Osborn, T. &.J. Swords, Campbell & Mitchell,

M. Harrison, Saml. A. Burus, and Benj. Crane: New York, NY 1808.

Letters From a Father to his Son, on Various Topics, Relative to Literature and the Conduct of Life. Written in the Years 1792 and 1793./ J. Aikin, M.D., No publisher noted: Philadelphia, PA 1796.

Letters of Junius/Junius. Henry Durell, New York. 1821.

The Life and Actions of Alexander the Great/The Rev. J. Williams, A.M., J. & J. Harper: New York, NY 1832.

The Life and Political Opinions of Martin Van Buren, Vice President of the United States /William M.Holland. Belknap & Hammersley. Hartford CT. 1835.

Life of Frederick the Second, King of Prussia, v.1, v.2/Lord Dover. J & J Harper: New York, NY 1832.

Life of George Washington v.1-2/ Jared Sparks, Abridged by the author. Ferdinand Andrews, Boston. 1840

The Life of Napoleon Buonaparte/Sir Walter Scott, author of 'Waverley" & co. J. & B. Williams: Edinburgh, Scotland. 1828.

Life of Petrarch/Dobson, Susannah. (no publisher available.) Liverpool. 1775.

Life of Petrarch/Anon. A Finlay and W.H. Hopkins: Philadelphia, PA. 1809

The Lives of Celebrated Travelers, Vol II/James Augustus St. John. J & J. Harper: New York, 1832.

The Lives of the Most Eminent English Poets; with Critical Observations on Their Works/Samuel Johnson, L.L.D. in Three Volumes - Vol. I-3. Benjamin Warner &Benjamin Buzby: Philadelphia. 1819

A Manual Containing Information Respecting the Growth of the Mulberry Tree With Suitable Direction for the Making of Silk/J.H. Cobb. Carter and Hendee: Boston, MA 1832.

Mavor's Collection/William Mavor L.L.D. E. Newberry: London U.K.1796

Voyages v.3

Voyages v.4

Travels of Richard Pococke Through Egypt. v.13

Memoir of the Late Rev. John Freeman/S.R. Smith: A.B. Frosh, Printer. Utica, NY. 1835

Memoirs of the Life of David Garrick, esq. v.1-2./Thomas Davies: Wells and Lilly, Boston. 1818.

Memoirs of Simon Bolivar, President Liberator of the Republic of Colombia; and of his Principal Generals/ Gen. H. L. V. Ducoudray Holstein. S.C. Goodrich & Co. Boston, MA 1829..

Miscellaneous Works of Oliver Goldsmith.v.2, v.3, v.4/Oliver Goldsmith, ed. By Aiken, J., M.D.. Coale & Thomas: Baltimore, 1809.

The Modern History of Universalism, From the Era of the Reformation to the Present Time/Thomas Whittenmore. Published by the Author: Boston, MA 1830.

MOORIANA: or Selections from the Moral, Philosophical and Miscellaneous works of the late Dr. John Moore v.1-v.2/Rev. F. Prevost and F. Blagdon. B. Crosby and Co. London, UK.

New and Complete Edition of Ossian's Poems/James McPherson, Esq. (trans). Peter A. Johnson: London, UK. 1815.

The Observer: Essays. v.1-3./Anon. Zachariah Jackson: Dublin. 1791.

On the Improvement of Society by the Diffusion of Knowledge: or, An Illustration of the Advantages Which Would Result From a More General Dissemination of Rational and Scientific Information Among All Ranks. Illustrated with Engravings./Thomas Dick, L.L.D. G. and C. Merriam, Springfield IL. 1833.

Palestine, or the Holy Land, From the Earliest Period to the Present Time/Rev. Michael Russell, L.L.D. J & J Harper, New York, NY 1832.

The Percy Anecdotes/Sholto and Reuben Percy [Sir John Byerley and Thomas Byerley] J. & J. Harper: New York, NY. 1832.

The Philosophy of Living; or, The Way to Enjoy Life and its Comforts./ Caleb Ticknor, A.M., M.D., Harper & Brothers: New York, NY 1836.

Pioneers: Or the Sources of the Susquehanna, v.2/Attrib. James Fenimore Cooper. Carey, Lee & Blanchard. Philadelphia, PA. 1825.

Plutarch's Lives/John Dryden. J.&R. Tonson: London, England. 1758

The Poems of Ossion (Ossian?); in Two Volumes; Vol. 2/ James McPherson, Esq. (trans). Peter A. Johnson: London, UK. 1815.

The Political Works of Thomas Paine/Thomas Paine. Peter Reynolds: Springfield, MA. 1826.

Posthumous Works of Junius/ Anon. G. & C. & H. Carville: New York, NY. 1829.

Practical Piety; Or, the Influence of the Religion of the Heart on the Conduct of the Life. (THE?)/ Hannah More. Peter B. Gleason and Co. and Oliver D. Cooke: Hartford, CT 1811.

The Publications of the American Tract Society; Vol. VIII; (Number of volumes undesignated)/Various authors. American Tract Society: New York, NY.

Ray's New Higher Arithmatic (Ray's Mathematical Series)/Joseph Ray, M.D. Van Antwerp, Bragg & Co.: New York and Cincinnati. 1880.

The Seasons of Spring Vol. II. (Subtitled The School Library. Vol. VIII.)/ Rev. F.W.P. Greenwood, D.D., Marsh, Capen, Lyon, and Webb: Boston, MA 1839.

The Seasons of Winter Vol. I. (Subtitled The School Library Vol. VII.)/ Rev. F.W.P. Greenwood, D.D. Marsh, Capen, Lyon, and Webb: Boston, MA 1839

Selections from the British Poets, v.2/Fitz-Greene Halleck. Harper and Brothers: New York, 1840.

Sermons by the Late Rev. Abiel Abbot, D.D./S. Everett. Wait, Greene, and Co.: Boston, 1831.

Sermons by the Late Rev. Joseph S. Buckminster/Anon. Wells and Lilly Court-Street: Boston, MA, 1821

Sermons by the Late Rev. Joseph Lathrope, D.D./Joseph Lathrop. A.G. Tannatt & Co: Springfield, MA. 1821.

Sermons on Several Subjects/Beilby Porteus, D.D. Lincoln and Gleason: Hartford. CT. 1806.

Sermons Delivered on Various Occasions/Joseph Lathrop, D.D. Isaiah Thomas, Jun.: Boston, MA 1812.

Sermons on Various Subjects, Evangelical, Devotional, and Practical/Joseph Lathrop, D.D. Isaiah Thomas, Jun: Worcester, MA 1809.

Solitude/John G. Zimmerman. Geo. McDowell & Sons: Baltimore MD, 1832.

Tales and Novels, Vols VII & VIII/Maria Edgeworth. J. & J. Harper: New York, 1833.

Tour of Asia, v.2/The Rev. T. Clark. W. Wells and T.B. Wait and Company: Boston, MA 1813(?)

The Traveller; Or Meditations on Various Subjects, Written on Board of a Man of War. To Which is Added, Converse with the World Unseen To Which is Prefixed the Life of the Author/James Miekle. J.H. Turney:

New York, NY 1832.

Travels in England, France, Spain, and the Barbary States, in the Years 1813-14 and 15./ Mordecai M. Noah. Kirk and Mercein: New York 1819.

Travels Through Sweden, Finland, and Lapland, to the North Cape, in the Years 1798 and 1799/ Joseph Acerbi. (no publisher noted) London, UK 1802.

The Unitarian Advocate, and Religious Miscellany. New Series, Vol. II/ Conducted by an Association of Gentlemen. Leonard C. Bowles: Philadelphia, PA 1830.

A Universal History of the United States of America/ C.B. Taylor. Ezra Strong: Springfield, MA 1830.

Universalism: from the time of the Apostles to its condemnation/Hosea Ballou ll. Marsh and Capen: Boston, MA. 1829.

The Useful Arts Vol. I. (Subtitled The School Library. Vol. XI.)/ Bigelow, Jacob M.D. Marsh, Capen, Lyon, and Webb: Boston, MA 1840

A View of the Life, Travels, and Philanthropic Labours of the Late John Howard, Esquire, .LL.D.F.R.S./John Aiken, M.D., David Huntington: New York, NY. 1814.

Village Dialogues, Between Farmer Littleworth, Rev. Mr. Lovegood, and Others; Four Volumes in Two; Volume II/Rowland Hill. W.W. Woodword: 1806.

Village Sermons: Doctrinal and Pastoral/Bernard Whitman. Leonard C. Bowles: Boston, MA 1832.

A Visit to the South Seas, v.2/C.S.Stewart, A.M. John P. Haven: New York, NY. 1833.

The Waverley Novels, with the Author's Last Corrections and Additions. v.1, v.4 of Five Volumes/ Walter Scott. Carey & Hart: Philadelphia, PA 1845.

Weld's English Grammar/AllenH. Weld, A.M. Sanborn, Carter, Bazin, & Co.: Boston 1849.

The Wept of Wish-Ton-Wish/ Walter, Scott. Carey, Lea, & Blanchard: Philadelphia, PA 1835.

Works of Lady Mary Wortley Montague in Five Volumes.v.1, v.2, v.3, v.5 /Lady Mary W. Montague. Richard Phillips: London, U.K. 1803.

Works of the Right Honourable Joseph Addison/Coll. By Mr. Tickell: William Durrell & Co. New York. 1811.

The Works of Thomas Chalmers, D.D., Minister of the Tron Church, Glasgow. Vol. I.&v.3/Thomas Chalmers, D.D. Printed by George Goodwin & Sons. Hartford, CT. 1822.

The Young Emigrants. A Tale Designed for Young Persons/Susan Anne Livingston Ridley Sedgwick. Carter and Hendee: Boston, MA. 1830.

Bound Periodical - New England Farmer and Gardeners Journal. 14 volumes of a 16 Vol. Set. Joseph Breck & Co.: Boston. 1838
