= Western Reserve Hospital =

Hospital in Ohio, United States

Coordinates: 41°07′59″N 81°30′40″W

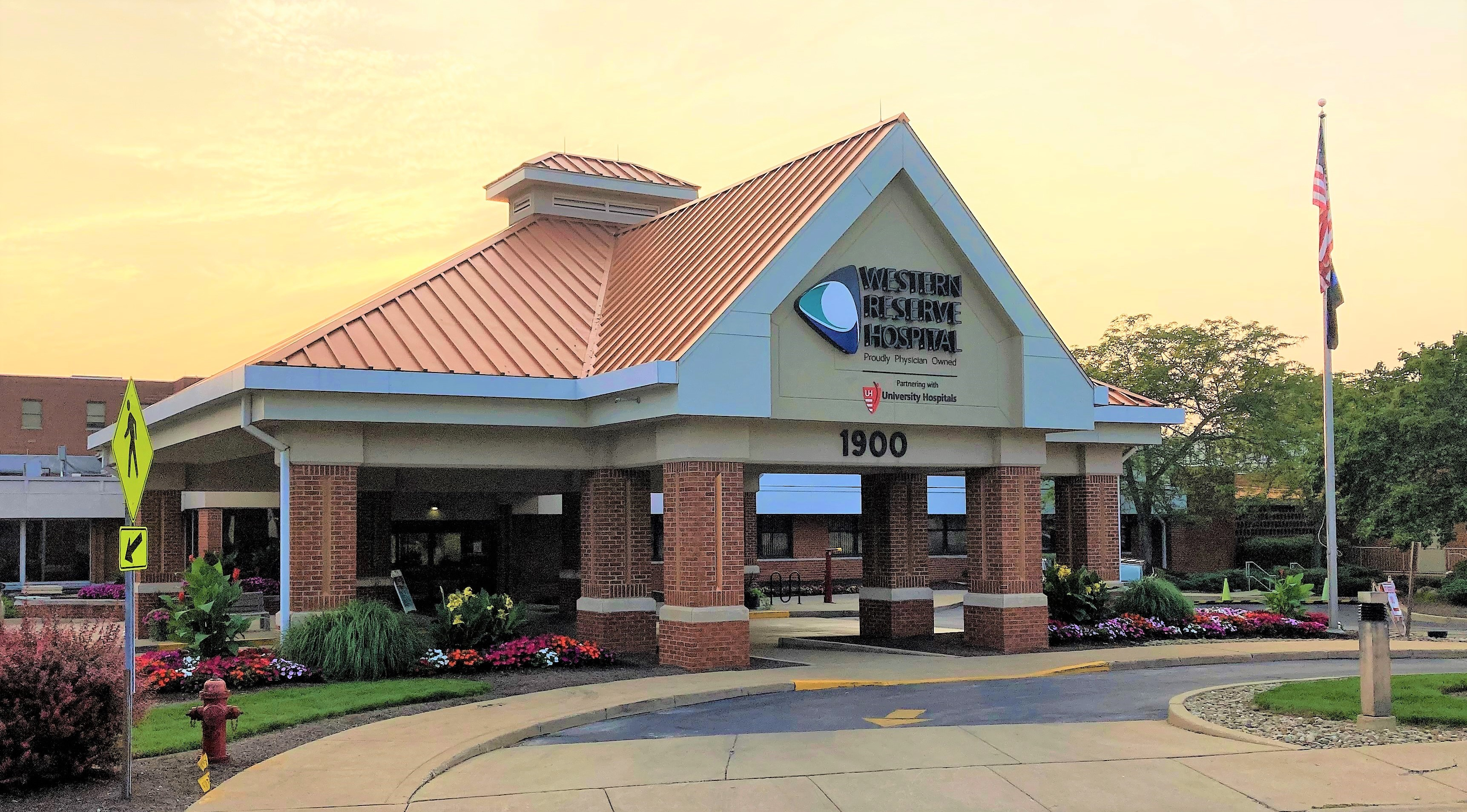
Western Reserve Hospital in Cuyahoga Falls, Ohio

Western Reserve Hospital is a physician-owned hospital in Cuyahoga Falls, Ohio. It is affiliated with University Hospitals, the healthcare system of Case Western Reserve University School of Medicine.

== History ==
Western Reserve Hospital was founded in 1943 as Green Cross Hospital, and in 1978 the name was changed to Cuyahoga Falls General Hospital. In 2001, the hospital became a member of Summa Health Systems. It is a charter member of the Centers of Osteopathic Research and Education, and is fully accredited by the Healthcare Facilities Accreditation Program. In 2009, Cuyahoga Falls General Hospital became Western Reserve Hospital as the result of a joint venture between Summa, who became a minority partner, and Western Reserve Hospital Partners, a group of about 200 physicians who assumed majority ownership and control of the hospital.

In 2015, Summa Health Systems, which owns a 40% stake in the hospital, sued to keep its partnership with the hospital after the doctors who owned a majority stake in the hospital allegedly removed members of Summa from the hospital board. The partnership entered into dispute when it was alleged by the doctors that Summa was violating terms of the agreement when they entered into a deal in 2013 with HealthSpan Partners. According to Western Reserve Hospital Partners, by giving minority ownership to HealthSpan, Western Reserve Hospital was limited in where it could offer its services.

In 2023, Western Reserve added a 53,000 square foot Health and Wellness Center that includes services such as endocrinology, orthopedics, gastroenterology and onsite laboratory and X-ray services.
