= Thom Hatch =

American author and novelist

Thom Hatch is an American author and novelist who specializes in the history of the American West, the American Civil War, and the Plains Indian Wars. Hatch was born in Erie, Pennsylvania and grew up on Grand Island, New York. He graduated from North Olmsted High School in North Olmsted, Ohio. He served in the United States Marine Corps, including deployment to Vietnam for 13 months. He then became a columnist for the Erie Times-News, and worked as a radio announcer during the late 1960s. In 1975, he moved to Colorado, where he writes books, contributes to national publications such as American Heritage, America's Civil War, True West, and Western Horseman, and teaches school. He has served as consultant and appeared on screen as an expert commentator for The History Channel, the Discovery Channel, and PBS documentaries, including "Butch Cassidy and the Sundance Kid" for PBS's The American Experience, based on his book The Last Outlaws. Hatch is regularly invited to speak at colleges, seminars, and civic and historic organizations. He lives with his artist wife, a daughter, and a cattle dog in Colorado's horse and cattle country.

In 2005, Hatch's Black Kettle: The Cheyenne Chief Who Sought Peace But Found War received the Spur Award for literary excellence as the best biography of the year from the Western Writers of America.

== Bibliography ==
Nonfiction

- The Father of American Conservation: George Bird Grinnell, Adventurer, Activist, and Author((ISBN 9781684423347))
- The Last Days of George Armstrong Custer: the True Story of the Battle of the Little Bighorn. ISBN 9781250051028
- The Last Outlaws: The Lives and Legends of Butch Cassidy and the Sundance Kid. ISBN 978-0-451-23919-8
- Black Kettle : The Cheyenne Chief Who Sought Peace But Found War. ISBN 0-471-44592-4.
- The Blue, the Gray, & the Red: Indian Campaigns of the Civil War. ISBN 0-8117-0016-X.
- The Custer Companion. ISBN 0-8117-0477-7.
- Clashes of Cavalry. ISBN 0-8117-0356-8.
- Custer and the Battle of the Little Bighorn. ISBN 0-7864-0154-0.
- The Alamo and the Texas Revolution. ISBN 0-7864-0593-7.
- Osceola and the Great Seminole War. ISBN 978-0-312-35591-3
- Glorious War: The Civil War Adventures of George Armstrong Custer. St. Martin's Press. ISBN 9781250028501.

Fiction

- The Bone Hunters. ISBN 978-0-9841683-1-6.
- Back to the Place and the Time: A Baseball Fantasy. ISBN 978-1-61296-611-3.
