= Connecticut Western Reserve =

Land area claimed by Connecticut until 1800

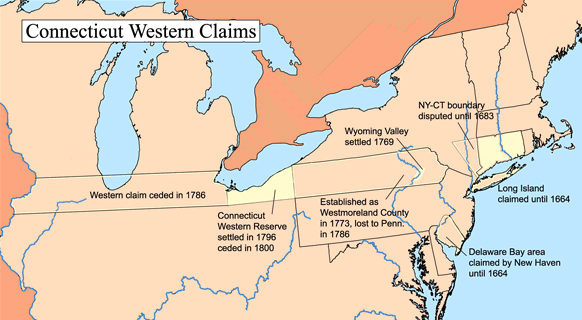
Connecticut's land claims in the western United States

The Connecticut Western Reserve was a portion of land claimed by the Connecticut Colony and later state of Connecticut in what is now mostly Northeast Ohio. The Western Reserve had been granted to Connecticut under the terms of its colonial charter by Charles II of England. The county seat of the Western Reserve was Warren, Ohio.

Connecticut relinquished its claim to some of its western lands to the United States in 1786 following the American Revolutionary War and preceding the 1787 establishment of the Northwest Territory. Despite ceding sovereignty to the United States, Connecticut retained ownership of the eastern portion of its cession, south of Lake Erie. It sold much of the Western Reserve to a group of speculators who operated as the Connecticut Land Company; they sold it in portions for development by new settlers. Connecticut ultimately relinquished its claims to the territory in 1800, and it became part of the Northwest Territory.

The Western Reserve name is preserved in numerous institutional names in Ohio, such as Case Western Reserve University, Western Reserve Hospital, and Western Reserve Transit Authority. In the 19th century, the Western Reserve "was probably the most intensely antislavery section of the country". John Brown Jr. called it, in 1859, "the New England of the West".

== Location ==
The Reserve encompassed all of the following present-day Ohio counties: Ashtabula, Cuyahoga, Erie and Huron (see Firelands), Geauga, Lake, Lorain, Medina, Portage, Trumbull; and portions of Ashland, Mahoning, Ottawa, Summit, and Wayne.

== History ==
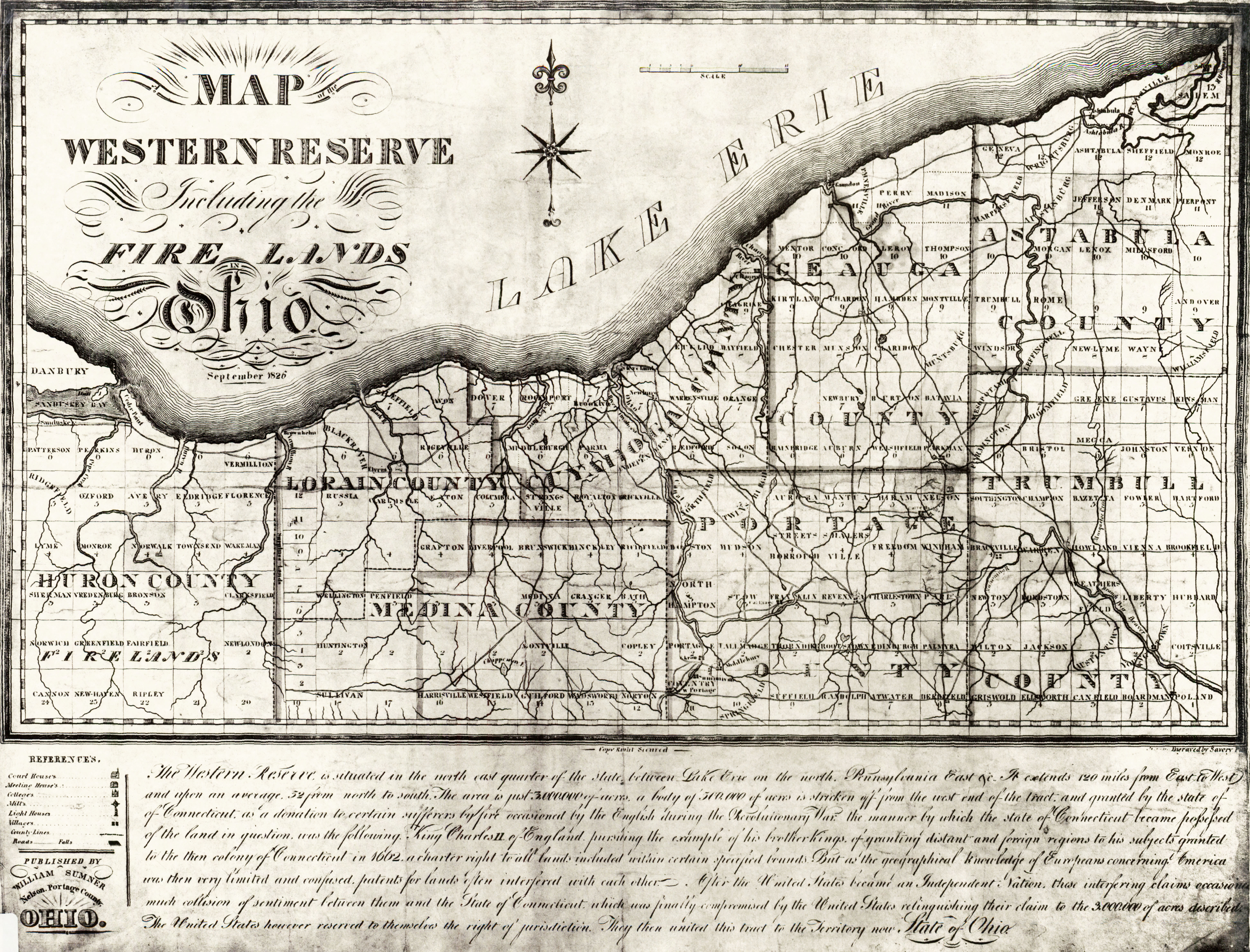
Map of the Western Reserve in 1826

Prior to the arrival of European colonists, the land surrounding the southern shore of Lake Erie was inhabited by the Erie people. At the close of a war against the Iroquois from 1654 to 1656, the Erie were almost completely annihilated. Their towns were destroyed, and any survivors were assimilated into neighboring tribes, mainly the Seneca.

After the American Revolutionary War, Connecticut was forced by the federal government to surrender the Pennsylvania portion (Westmoreland County) of its "sea-to-sea grant" following the Pennamite–Yankee Wars. Nevertheless, the state held fast to its claim on the lands between the 41st and 42nd-and-2-minutes parallels that lay west of the Pennsylvania state border.

The claim within Ohio was to a 120-mile (190 km)-wide strip between Lake Erie and a line just south of present-day Youngstown, Akron, New London, and Willard, about 3 miles (4.8 km) south of present-day U.S. Highway 224. The claim beyond Ohio included parts of Michigan, Indiana, Illinois, Iowa, Nebraska, Wyoming, Utah, Nevada, and California. The eastern boundary of the reserve follows a true meridian along Ellicott's Line, the boundary with Pennsylvania. The western boundary veers more than four degrees from a meridian to maintain the 120-mile width, due to convergence.

Connecticut gave up western land claims following the American Revolutionary War in exchange for federal assumption of its debt, as did several other states. From these concessions, the Articles of Confederation government organized the Northwest Territory (formally known as the "Territory Northwest of the River Ohio"). The deed of cession was issued on September 13, 1786. As population increased in portions of the Northwest Territory, new states were organized and admitted to the Union in the early 19th century.

Connecticut retained 3,366,921 acres (13,625.45 km^{2}) in Ohio, which became known as the "Western Reserve". The state sold the Western Reserve to the Connecticut Land Company in 1796 (possibly August 12, September 2, or September 5, 1795) for $1,200,000. The Land Company were a group of investors who were mostly from Suffield, Connecticut. The initial eight men in the group (or possibly seven or 35) planned to divide the land into homestead plots and sell it to settlers from the east.

But the Indian titles to the Reserve had not been extinguished. Clear title was obtained east of the Cuyahoga River by the Greenville Treaty in 1795 and west of the river in the Treaty of Fort Industry in 1805. The western end of the reserve included the Firelands or "Sufferers' Lands", 500,000 acres (2,000 km^{2}) reserved by Connecticut in 1792 for residents of several New England towns which had been destroyed by British-set fires during the Revolutionary War.

The next year, the Land Company sent surveyors led by Moses Cleaveland to the Reserve to divide the land into square townships, 5 miles (8.0 km) on each side (25 square miles (65 km^{2}). Cleaveland's team also founded the city of Cleveland along Lake Erie, which became the largest city in the region. (The first "a" was dropped; spelling of names was not standardized at the time.)

In 1798, surveyors laid out the Girdled Road, indicated by girdled trees, which ran from Cleveland to the Pennsylvania state line near Lake Erie. A modern portion of Girdled Road still exists by that name.

The territory was originally named "New Connecticut" (later discarded in favor of "Western Reserve"), and settlers began to trickle in during the next few years. Youngstown was founded in 1796, Warren in 1798, Hudson and Ravenna in 1799, Ashtabula in 1803, and Stow in 1804.

=== Legal issues with title ===
A major issue faced by the Land Company was that their purchase of the land was of questionable legality. Connecticut claimed to have sold them not only the title to the Western Reserve, but also the right to govern its inhabitants. It was unclear whether a state could sell its jurisdiction to a private company. This legal gray area caused queasiness by investors, so in 1797, the Connecticut legislature signed a bill to transfer the land to the federal government. However, the shareholders and customers of the Land Company feared that this offer would cause them to lose their titles, and they instead requested that Connecticut intervene to have Congress recognize the jurisdiction of the Land Company. In February 1800, a federal committee headed by John Marshall found that the titles and jurisdiction of the Western Reserve remained formally in the hands of Connecticut, observing that this created an exclave with significant practical problems for governance. He proposed that the federal government simply obtain direct jurisdiction over the land.

== Dissolution and legacy ==
The Western Reserve thereby became federal property in April 1800, and settlers were allowed to retain their titles. The United States absorbed it into the Northwest Territory, which organized Trumbull County within the boundaries of the Reserve. Warren, Ohio is the former county seat of the Reserve and identifies itself as "the historical capital of the Western Reserve." Later, several more counties were carved out of the territory. The name "Western Reserve" survives in the area in various institutions such as the "Western Reserve Historical Society" and Case Western Reserve University in Cleveland.

The Western Reserve was arguably the most anti-slavery region of the country in the pre-Civil War period. Many Underground Railroad routes ended with a trip through the Western Reserve to a boat to cross Lake Erie into what is today Ontario. The three oldest sons of the abolitionist John Brown—John Jr., Jason, and Owen—together with other participants in John Brown's raid on Harpers Ferry, were all living in Ashtabula County, for security; the Governor of Ohio, William Dennison Jr., refused to honor Virginia's request for Owen's arrest and extradition. A U.S. Marshall, attempting to serve a warrant requiring Owen to testify before a U.S. Senate committee, reported that without "an armed force" he could not be arrested; "in Ashtabula County...there is a secret and armed organization numbering several hundred." They proclaimed themselves safer there than in any other place in the U.S., or even in Canada.

This area of Ohio became a center of resource development and industrialization through the mid-20th century. It was a center of the steel industry, receiving iron ore shipped through the Great Lakes from Minnesota, processing it into steel products, and shipping these products to the east. This industry stimulated the development of great freight lakers, as the steam ships were known, including the first steel ships in the 20th century. Railroads took over some of the freight and commodity transportation from the lake ships. In the late 19th and early 20th centuries, these cities attracted hundreds of thousands of European immigrants and migrants (both black and white) from the rural South to its industrial jobs.

In the 1860 United States presidential election in Ohio, Abraham Lincoln performed best in the Western Reserve.

=== 2011 National Heritage Area study ===
At the request of Congress in 2011, the National Park Service prepared a feasibility study for declaring the 14-county region of the Western Reserve as a National Heritage Area. This is a means to encourage broad-based preservation of such historical sites and buildings that are related to a large historical theme. Such assessment and designation has been significant for recognizing assets, and encouraging new development and businesses, including heritage tourism, often related to adaptive re-use of waterways, and buildings, as well as totally new endeavors. The United States has designated 49 National Heritage Areas, including two in Ohio: the Ohio Canal of the Ohio and Erie Canal and the National Aviation Heritage Area.

The NPS study coordinator said that while the region had the historic assets, and there was considerable public support for such a designation, the Western Reserve lacked "a definitive coordinating entity or supporting group," which is required to gain Congressional approval. Specifically, while the Western Reserve Land Conservancy managed natural resources, the Western Reserve Historical Society worked towards a collective story of the region, and the Fund for our Economic Future collaborated on tourism opportunities, there was no single institution coordinating all aspects of a possible Heritage Area. If such a body develops in the future, it might seek federal designation as a Heritage Area.

== Architecture ==
The settlers in northern Ohio repeated the style of structures and the development of towns with which they were familiar in New England; many buildings in the new settlements were designed in the Georgian, Federal, and Greek Revival styles. Towns such as Aurora, Bath, Canfield, Chagrin Falls, Gates Mills, Hudson, Medina, Milan, Norwalk, Oberlin, Painesville, Poland, and Tallmadge exemplify the expression of these styles and traditional New England town planning. For instance, Cleveland's Public Square reflects the traditional New England central town green.

== See also ==
- Connecticut Colony
- Firelands
- Greater Cleveland
- Northeast Ohio
- Ohio Lands
- Ox-Cart Library
- Western Reserve Historical Society
- State cessions
