= North Olmsted, Ohio =

- City
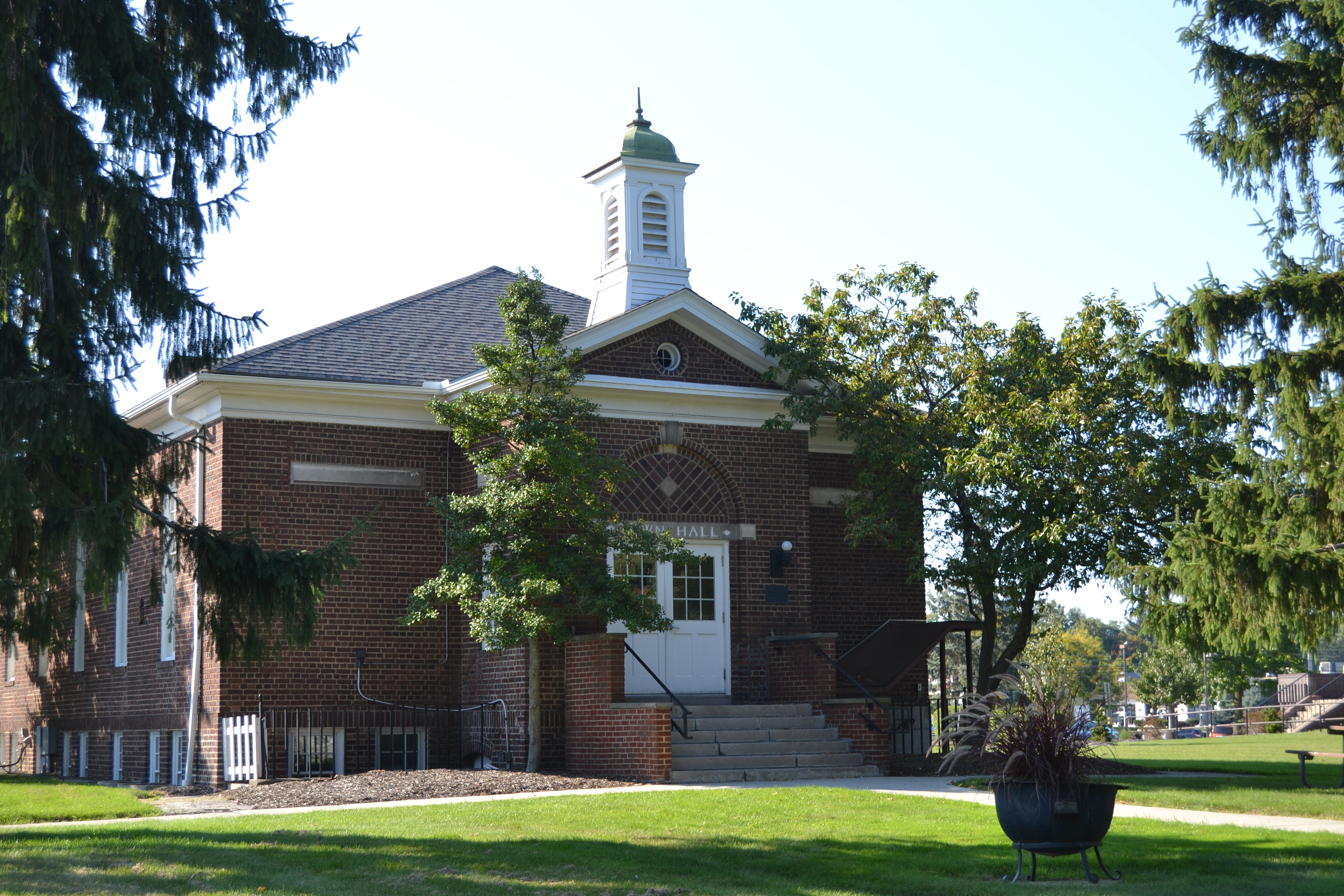
- North Olmsted Old Town Hall

- Flag Logo
- Interactive map of North Olmsted, Ohio
- Location within Ohio Location within the United States
- Coordinates: 41°24′54″N 81°54′52″W
- Country: United States
- State: Ohio
- County: Cuyahoga

Government
  - Mayor: Nicole Dailey Jones (D)

Area
  - Total: 11.67 sq mi (30.23 km^{2})
  - Land: 11.67 sq mi (30.23 km^{2})
  - Water: 0 sq mi (0.00 km^{2})
- Elevation: 761 ft (232 m)

Population (2020)
  - Total: 32,442
  - Density: 2,779.3/sq mi (1,073.11/km^{2})
- Time zone: UTC-5 (Eastern (EST))
  - Summer (DST): UTC-4 (EDT)
- ZIP code: 44070
- Area code: 440 216
- FIPS code: 39-56882
- GNIS feature ID: 1056457
- Website: www.north-olmsted.com

North Olmsted is a city in Cuyahoga County, Ohio, United States. The population was 32,442 as of the 2020 census. It is a western suburb of Cleveland and part of the Cleveland metropolitan area.

== History ==
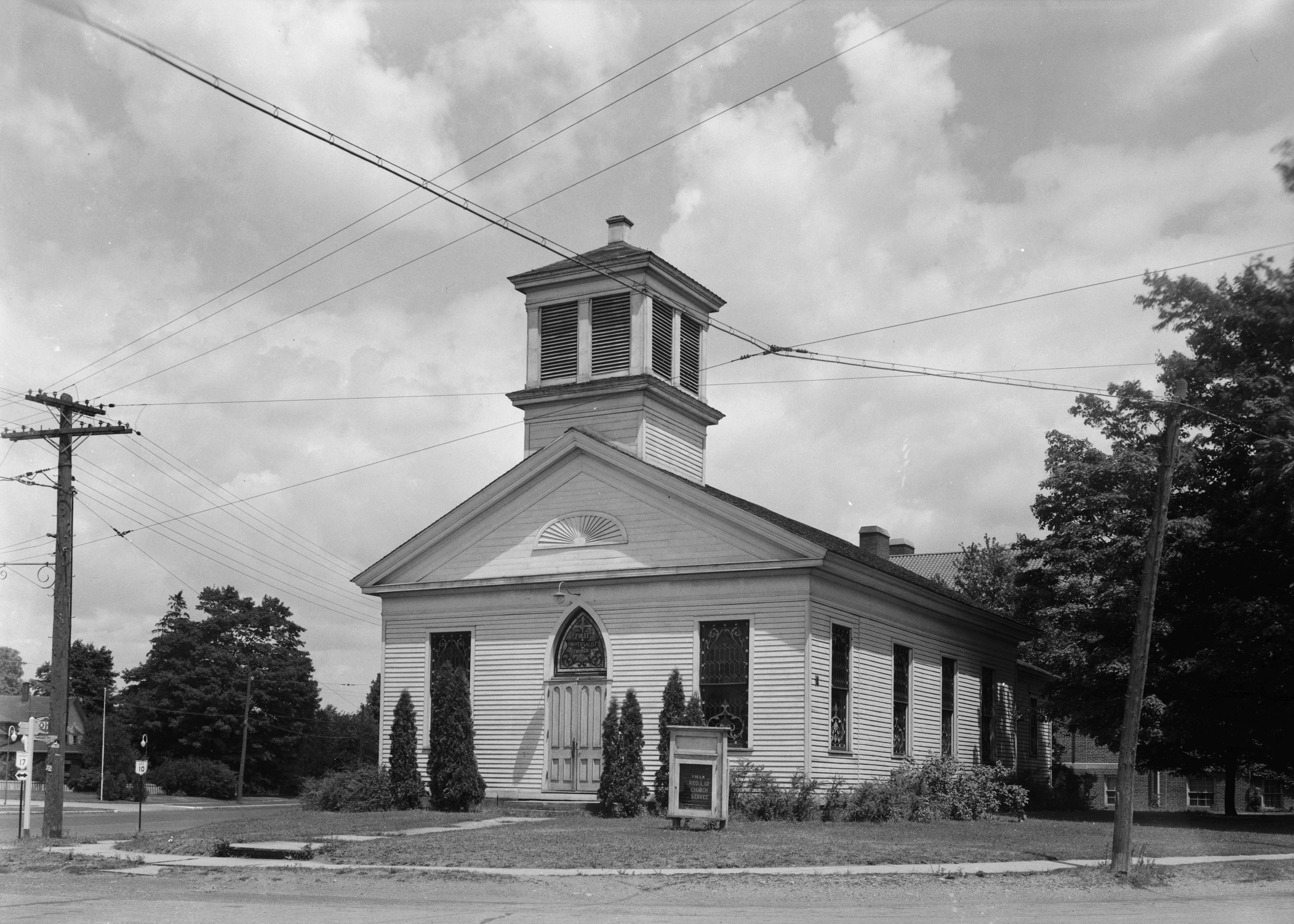
First Universalist Church of Olmsted, 1936

The land that became North Olmsted was originally part of the French colony of Canada (New France), which was ceded in 1763 to Great Britain and renamed Province of Quebec. In the late 18th century the land became part of the Connecticut Western Reserve in the Northwest Territory, then was purchased by the Connecticut Land Company in 1795.

In 1805, the vast tract of land comprising present-day North Olmsted, Olmsted Falls and Olmsted Township was purchased for $30,000 by Aaron Olmsted, a wealthy sea captain. Elijah Stearns and his sons David Johnson and Alva traveled 500 miles from Vermont to Cuyahoga County to inspect the land they intended to purchase from the Olmsted estate. Elijah and Alva returned to Vermont to complete the purchase, but David remained behind, becoming North Olmsted's first settler. It was first called Plum Creek Township, an unofficial name, in 1807 and then in 1814 surveyors called it Kingston. On April 14, 1823, the people organized into a township called Lenox. In 1909, the city of North Olmsted came into being.

In 1826, Aaron Olmsted's son, Charles Hyde Olmsted, offered to donate books from his father's personal collection in Connecticut, if the residents of Lenox agreed to change the name of the area to Olmsted to honor his father. These books became known as the Ox Cart Library.

== Geography ==
North Olmsted is located at 41°24′54″N 81°54′52″W (41.415097, -81.914366).

According to the United States Census Bureau, the city has a total area of 11.67 square miles (30.23 km^{2}), all land.

== Demographics ==
Historical population
Census	Pop.	Note	%±
1910	1,030		—
1920	1,419		37.8%
1930	2,624		84.9%
1940	3,487		32.9%
1950	6,604		89.4%
1960	16,290		146.7%
1970	34,861		114.0%
1980	36,480		4.6%
1990	34,204		−6.2%
2000	34,113		−0.3%
2010	32,718		−4.1%
2020	32,442		−0.8%

90.6% spoke English, 2.3% Arabic, 1.5% Spanish, and 0.9% German, in their households.

=== Racial and ethnic composition ===
North Olmsted city, Ohio – Racial and ethnic composition Note: the US Census treats Hispanic/Latino as an ethnic category. This table excludes Latinos from the racial categories and assigns them to a separate category. Hispanics/Latinos may be of any race.
Race / Ethnicity (NH = Non-Hispanic)	Pop 2000	Pop 2010	Pop 2020	% 2000	% 2010	% 2020
White alone (NH)	31,666	29,568	27,577	92.83%	90.37%	85.00%
Black or African American alone (NH)	341	617	950	1.00%	1.89%	2.93%
Native American or Alaska Native alone (NH)	37	31	32	0.11%	0.09%	0.10%
Asian alone (NH)	935	877	903	2.74%	2.68%	2.78%
Native Hawaiian or Pacific Islander alone (NH)	3	10	8	0.01%	0.03%	0.02%
Other race alone (NH)	33	50	116	0.10%	0.15%	0.36%
Mixed race or Multiracial (NH)	523	429	1,228	1.53%	1.31%	3.79%
Hispanic or Latino (any race)	575	1,136	1,628	1.69%	3.47%	5.02%
Total	34,113	32,718	32,442	100.00%	100.00%	100.00%

=== 2020 census ===
As of the 2020 census, North Olmsted had a population of 32,442. The median age was 44.2 years. 18.6% of residents were under the age of 18 and 22.3% of residents were 65 years of age or older. For every 100 females there were 95.5 males, and for every 100 females age 18 and over there were 92.9 males age 18 and over.

100.0% of residents lived in urban areas, while 0.0% lived in rural areas.

There were 13,807 households in North Olmsted, of which 23.7% had children under the age of 18 living in them. Of all households, 47.7% were married-couple households, 18.9% were households with a male householder and no spouse or partner present, and 27.1% were households with a female householder and no spouse or partner present. About 31.7% of all households were made up of individuals and 14.3% had someone living alone who was 65 years of age or older.

There were 14,390 housing units, of which 4.1% were vacant. The homeowner vacancy rate was 0.8% and the rental vacancy rate was 6.3%.

Racial composition as of the 2020 census
Race	Number	Percent
White	28,019	86.4%
Black or African American	995	3.1%
American Indian and Alaska Native	60	0.2%
Asian	911	2.8%
Native Hawaiian and Other Pacific Islander	9	0.0%
Some other race	516	1.6%
Two or more races	1,932	6.0%
Hispanic or Latino (of any race)	1,628	5.0%

=== 2010 census ===
At the 2010 census there were 32,718 people in 13,645 households, including 8,893 families, in the city. The population density was 2,803.6 inhabitants per square mile (1,082.5/km^{2}). There were 14,500 housing units at an average density of 1,242.5 per square mile (479.7/km^{2}). The racial makeup of the city was 92.6% White, 2.0% African American, 0.1% Native American, 2.7% Asian, 0.9% from other races, and 1.7% from two or more races. Hispanic or Latino people of any race were 3.5%.

Of the 13,645 households 26.5% had children under the age of 18 living with them, 51.6% were married couples living together, 9.6% had a female householder with no husband present, 4.1% had a male householder with no wife present, and 34.8% were non-families. 30.1% of households were one person and 12.3% were one person aged 65 or older. The average household size was 2.37 and the average family size was 2.97.

The median age was 43.5 years. 20.7% of residents were under the age of 18; 7.7% were between the ages of 18 and 24; 23.5% were from 25 to 44; 30.1% were from 45 to 64; and 17.8% were 65 or older. The gender makeup of the city was 48.3% male and 51.7% female.

=== 2000 census ===
At the 2000 census there were 34,113 people in 13,517 households, including 9,367 families, in the city. The population density was 2,932.9 inhabitants per square mile (1,132.4/km^{2}). There were 14,059 housing units at an average density of 1,208.7 per square mile (466.7/km^{2}). The racial makeup of the city was 93.97% White, 1.01% African American, 0.13% Native American, 2.74% Asian, 0.01% Pacific Islander, 0.45% from other races, and 1.68% from two or more races. Hispanic or Latino people of any race were 1.69%.

Of the 13,517 households 29.6% had children under the age of 18 living with them, 57.4% were married couples living together, 8.6% had a female householder with no husband present, and 30.7% were non-families. 26.5% of households were one person and 9.9% were one person aged 65 or older. The average household size was 2.50 and the average family size was 3.07.

The age distribution was 23.7% under the age of 18, 7.3% from 18 to 24, 27.6% from 25 to 44, 26.5% from 45 to 64, and 15.0% 65 or older. The median age was 40 years. For every 100 females, there were 93.3 males. For every 100 females age 18 and over, there were 89.7 males.

The median household income was $52,542 and the median family income was $62,422. Males had a median income of $45,908 versus $30,600 for females. The per capita income for the city was $24,329. About 2.8% of families and 4.1% of the population were below the poverty line, including 4.3% of those under age 18 and 6.5% of those age 65 or over.

== Economy ==
Moen Incorporated, a fixture and faucet company, is headquartered in North Olmsted.

CommuteAir, a regional airline flying on behalf of United Express, was formerly headquartered in North Olmsted, before moving to Westlake in May 2025.

== Education ==
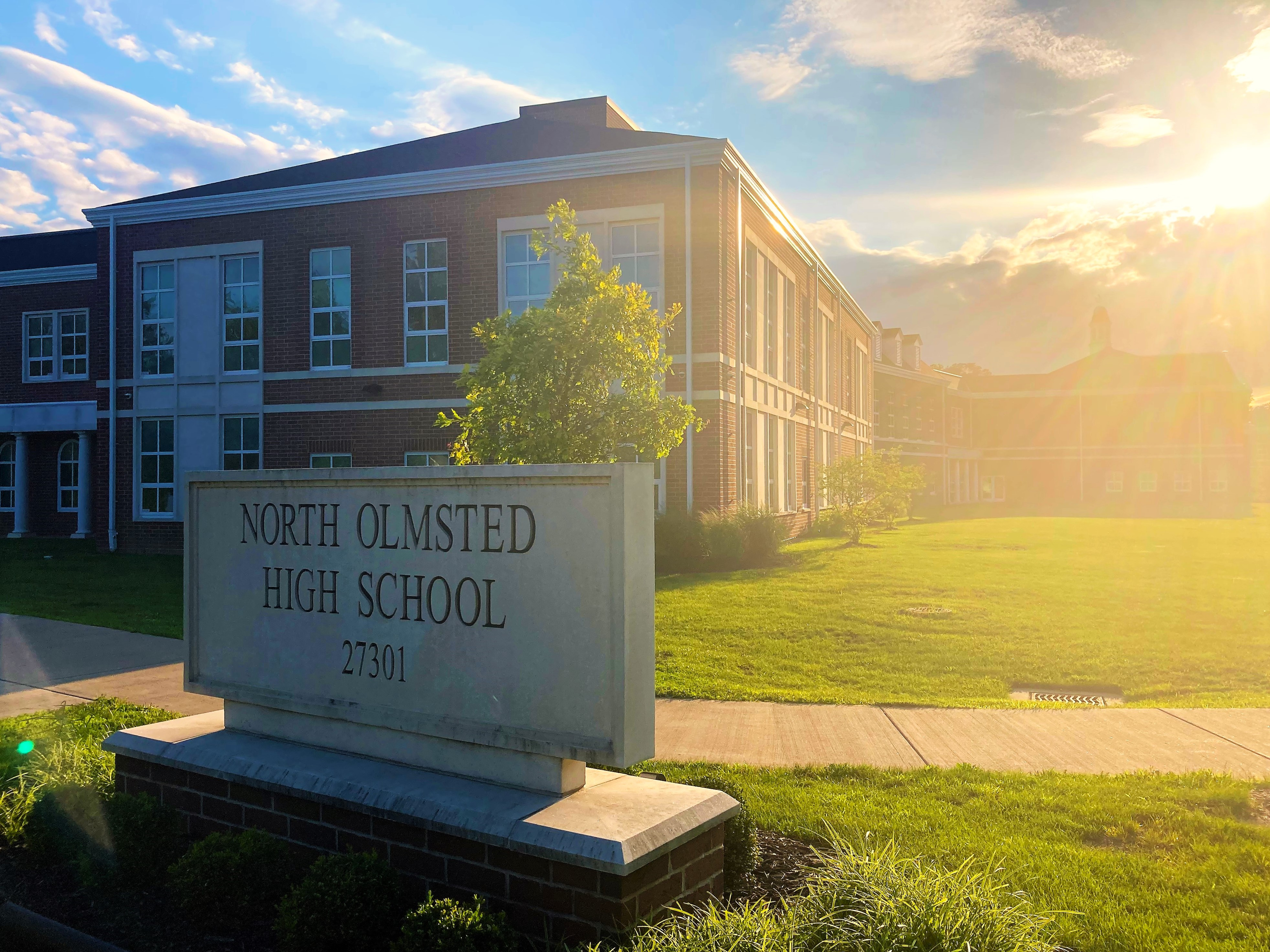
North Olmsted High School

North Olmsted is served by the public North Olmsted City School District, which includes three primary schools (grades K–2), three intermediate schools (grades 3–5), one middle school (grades 6–8), and North Olmsted High School (grades 9–12).

== Transportation ==
Lorain Road is part of Ohio State Route 10. Lorain Road also contains Ohio State Route 252 for a short stretch. It enters the city from North Ridgeville to the west and from Fairview Park to the east. It then continues through Cleveland, where it is designated Lorain Avenue. West of North Olmsted, Lorain Road connects via connector road with the Ohio Turnpike at Exit 152. At one time, a section of Lorain Road in North Olmsted was listed in the Guinness Book of World Records for having the most restaurants within a mile radius.

== Notable people ==
- Ryan Dennick, former professional baseball pitcher
- Tim Gettinger, professional ice hockey forward for the Grand Rapids Griffins of the American Hockey League
- Thom Hatch, author and novelist
- Mitzi Hoag, actress
- Brian Hoyer, American football quarterback for the Las Vegas Raiders of the National Football League
- Anthony Kelly, retired professional lacrosse player
- Michael Kennedy, screenwriter and producer
- Greg Lynn, architect
- Scott Medvin, former professional baseball pitcher
- David Monahan, actor
- Adam Russell, former professional baseball pitcher
- Charles Alden Seltzer, writer
- Michael Symon, chef, restaurateur, television personality, and author
- John "Bernie" Toorish, member of The Four Lads
- Randy Wood, artist and performer
