= Campbellsport, Ohio =

Unincorporated community in Ohio, U.S.

Coordinates: 41°08′09″N 81°11′50″W

Campbellsport is an unincorporated community in Portage County, in the U.S. state of Ohio. It is located southeast of Ravenna around the intersection of Industry Road and Ohio State Route 14, where the townships of Ravenna, Charlestown, Rootstown, and Edinburg meet. Much of the area is now occupied by the adjacent West Branch State Park and Michael J. Kirwan Reservoir, which were created in 1965.

== History ==
The community was named for John Campbell, an early settler, and for its location as a port along the Pennsylvania and Ohio Canal. A post office was in operation at Campbellsport from 1841 until 1903.
