= Portage County, Ohio =

- County
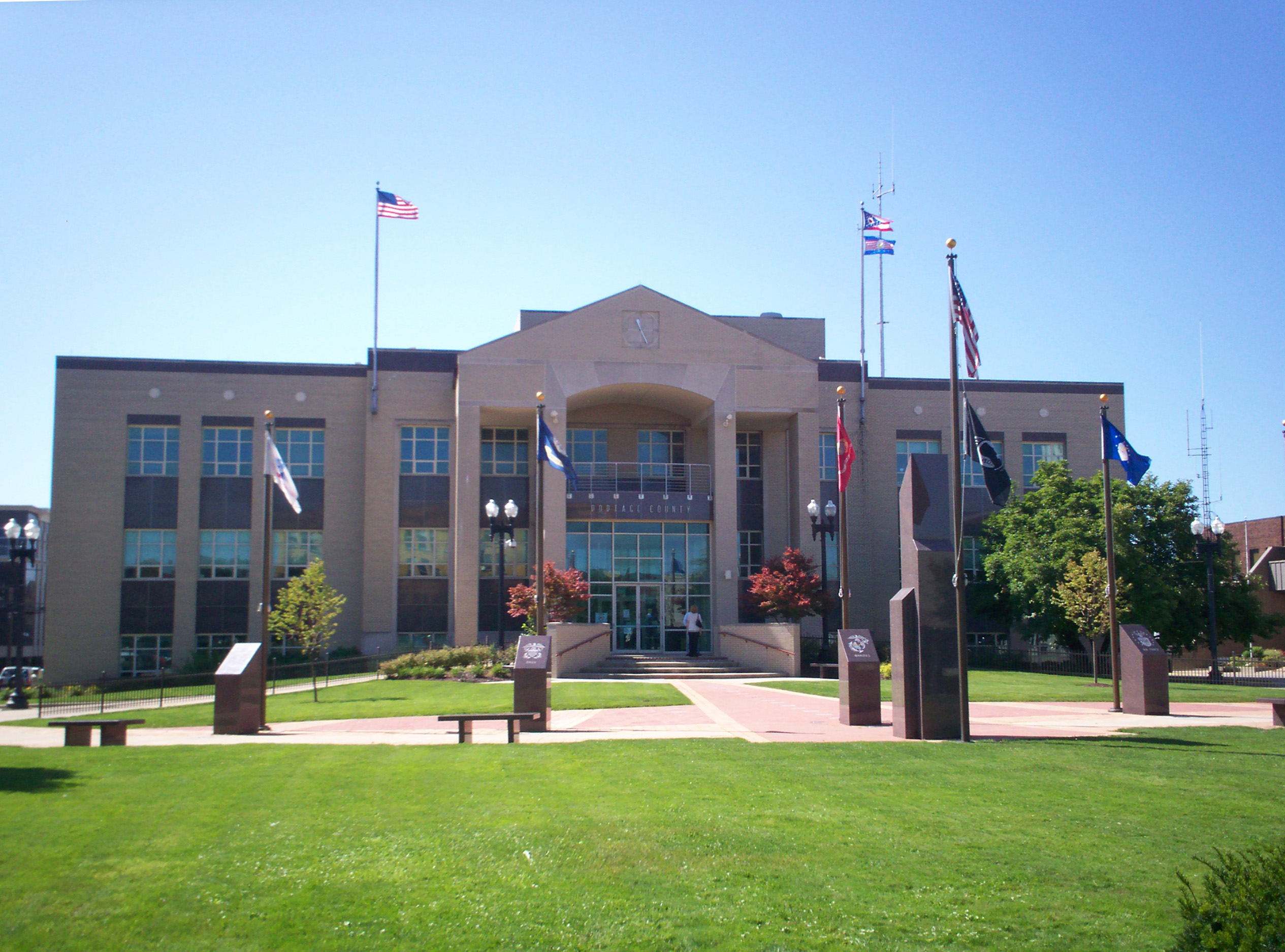
- Portage County Courthouse

- Flag Seal

- Location within the U.S. state of Ohio
- Coordinates: 41°10′N 81°12′W
- Country: United States
- State: Ohio
- Founded: June 7, 1808
- Named for: the portage between the Cuyahoga and Tuscarawas Rivers
- Seat: Ravenna
- Largest city: Kent

Area
  - Total: 504 sq mi (1,310 km^{2})
  - Land: 487 sq mi (1,260 km^{2})
  - Water: 17 sq mi (44 km^{2}) 3.3%

Population (2020)
  - Total: 161,791
  - Estimate (2025): 163,404 ▲
  - Density: 320/sq mi (120/km^{2})
- Time zone: UTC−5 (Eastern)
  - Summer (DST): UTC−4 (EDT)
- Congressional districts: 13th, 14th
- Website: www.portagecounty-oh.gov

Portage County is a county in the U.S. state of Ohio. As of the 2020 census, the population was 161,791. Located in Northeast Ohio, Portage County is part of the Akron Metropolitan Statistical Area, which is also included in the Cleveland–Akron–Canton Combined Statistical Area. Its county seat is Ravenna and its largest city is Kent. The county, named for the portage between the Cuyahoga and Tuscarawas rivers, was created in 1807 and formally organized in 1808. In addition to the cities of Kent and Ravenna, Portage County also includes the cities of Aurora and Streetsboro, along with five villages, 18 civil townships, and several unincorporated places within those townships. Additionally, the county includes parts of the city of Tallmadge, and part of the village of Mogadore, both of which are mostly in neighboring Summit County.

== History ==
The name "Portage" comes from an old Native American path called "Portage Path", which ran between the Cuyahoga and Tuscarawas rivers, where travelers portaged their canoes. The location of the trail today is within the boundaries of neighboring Summit County.

As of 1600, the area was likely almost entirely home to the Whittlesey culture, a presumably Algonquian people who lived along the southern shore of Lake Erie, to the west of the Erie Nation. They were a mixed culture people that exhibited signs of picking up traits from both Fort Ancients and Iroquoians. The Erie may have also held a bit of the area, but this is unclear. During the Beaver Wars, approximately 1632–1701, the Whittlesey and Erie were already at war when the Erie decided to also declare war on the Iroquois for the atrocities being committed against allied tribes in Canada. The Erie lost around 1650 and the Whittlesey were likely similarly subjugated afterwards, as the Iroquois conquered all the way to the shores of Lake Michigan by the 1670s.

The Iroquois placed a vassal tribe of captured Huron in the area who became known as the Wyandot, while they conquered further west. Later, the French made it to the Mississippi River and volunteered to aid the Natives in that region to push the Iroquois back to New York. By the end of the Beaver Wars, the Wyandot had broken free of Iroquois control and reabsorbed surviving Hurons taking refuge all over the Great Lakes, but set aside the area roughly between the Cuyahoga River, the Mahoning River and the Ohio-Pennsylvania border as a collective hunting ground, to be enjoyed by all the tribes of the region. The Lenape had a village around modern day Youngstown, possibly established during the 1690s, from which they and the Seneca and Shawnee from further south staged ventures into the region. Up in Ashtabula County, the Ottawas, or Mississaugas, from the western end of Lake Erie were allowed to maintain a village at Conneaut. Ashtabula itself seems to come from the Algonquian name for the area and roughly translates to "Place with Enough for everyone." The Lenape later lost rights to the eastern extremes of their territory between the Potomac River and the Mahoning River by a government proclamation in 1763, but sources say they began relocating into Tuscarawas and Holmes counties in 1758 in preparation for such an event.

The region continued being used as such until around 1785, when the newly formed United States tried issuing a treaty stripping the vast majority of what is now Ohio from Native control and began offering subsidies for people to move into the region, sparking the Northwest Indian War from 1785–1795. In the aftermath, the government issued the Treaty of Greenville, which stripped even more land from the Natives than originally planned and opened up northeast Ohio for white settlement for the first time. Most Natives did not leave and mixed tribal communities still existed all over the state for some time afterwards, with permanent Ottawa, Seneca, and Wyandot villages still existing in what is now Portage and Geauga counties. All written accounts of Natives seems to have ceased sometime around the War of 1812, which coincided with the Shawnee War (1811–1813). The local government had its own land arrangements with the Natives for a time. It is unclear where the Natives went after that, but this may coincide with the 1811–1812 New Madrid earthquakes, some of the largest earthquakes to ever hit the east coast in recorded history. It was interpreted by many Ohio Natives that they should throw their support behind Shawnee cult leader, Tenskwatawa, at the Prophettown stronghold, coinciding with the outbreak of the Shawnee War later that year. Most of the Eastern nations got sucked up into his cult and many Natives relocated to live near him.

Portage County is also home to a burial mound—Towner's Mound, in Franklin Township—which predates all the above mentioned cultures. It was unique in structure to other types of burial mounds from the Adena, Hopewell, and Fort Ancient cultures, but identical to two other excavated mounds in North Benton, Ohio, and Warren, Pennsylvania.

After the discovery of the New World, the land that became Portage County was originally part of the French colony of Canada (New France), which was ceded in 1763 to Great Britain and renamed the Province of Quebec. In the late 18th century, the land became part of the Connecticut Western Reserve in the Northwest Territory, which was purchased by the Connecticut Land Company in 1795.

The first European settler in what is now Portage County was Abraham Honey in 1798 in the area now known as Mantua Township, followed by Asa Hall in what is now Atwater Township in April 1799. In June 1799, Benjamin Tappan, Jr. arrived and founded Ravenna, David Daniels came to what is now Palmyra Township, and Ebenezer Sheldon settled in what is now Aurora. A family group of Huguenot refugees also eventually migrated to Portage County by 1804.

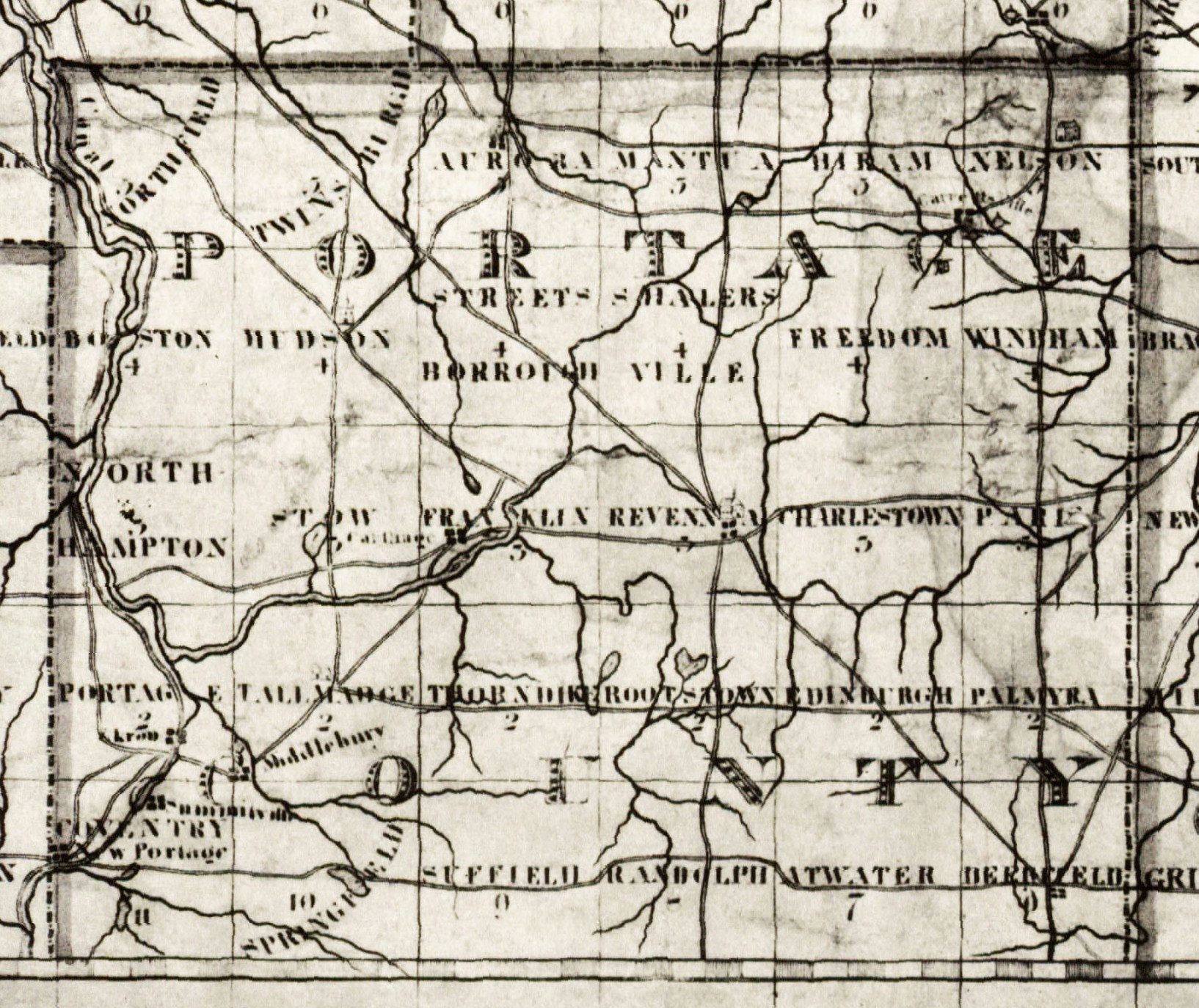
1826 map of Portage County with 30 townships

When first settled, the area that presently constitutes Portage County was part of the original Jefferson County, which had been organized in 1797. In 1800, the area was made part of Trumbull County, which followed the boundaries of the Connecticut Western Reserve. In 1802, all of what is now Portage County was organized under the name of Franklin Township with other townships being formed later. On February 10, 1807, the Ohio state legislature passed the act to create Portage County from Trumbull County, taking effect on June 7, 1807. Portage County remained attached to Trumbull County until June 8, 1808, when the first elections were held. Initially, the county included a large area of the Western Reserve that encompassed most of present-day Summit County, all of Medina and Huron counties, and parts of Lorain and Ashland counties. There were six organized townships in 1808: Franklin, Deerfield, Aurora, Hiram, Springfield, and Hudson, with new townships organized later, reaching a maximum of 30. The present-day boundaries of Portage County were established in 1840 following the 1812 creation of Medina County, a slight boundary adjustment in 1827 with Cuyahoga County, and finally the creation of Summit County in 1840, which took 10 townships from Portage County, along with 3 townships from Medina County and two from Stark County.

What is referred to as the last great train robbery in US history occurred in Garrettsville in 1935. The government sent in a massive team to investigate, whom the locals called the G-Men. Today, the James A. Garfield schools in Garrettsville have the G-Men as their team mascot.

Portage County was also the site of the Kent State shootings on May 4, 1970.

== Geography ==
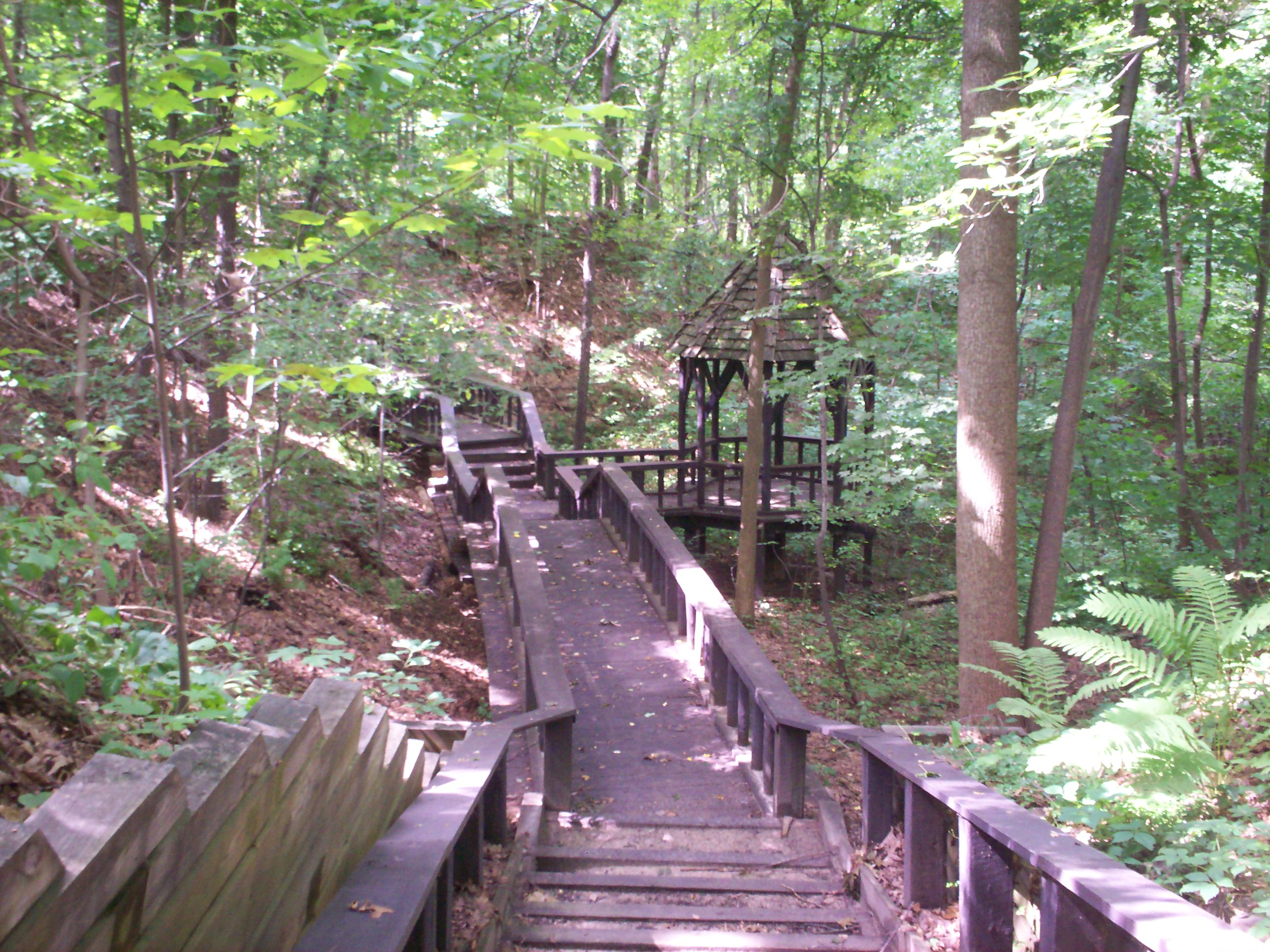
Gazebo at Towner's Woods Park in Franklin Township, part of the county park system

According to the U.S. Census Bureau, the county has a total area of 504 square miles (1,310 km^{2}), of which 487 square miles (1,260 km^{2}) is land and 17 square miles (44 km^{2}) (3.3%) is water.

West Branch State Park is a very large state park in central Portage County, consisting of a large green surrounding the Michael J. Kirwan Dam and Reservoir. There are a number of smaller state and local parks.

=== Adjacent counties ===
- Geauga County (north)
- Trumbull County (east)
- Mahoning County (southeast)
- Stark County (south)
- Summit County (west)
- Cuyahoga County (northwest)

== Demographics ==
Historical population
Census	Pop.	Note	%±
1810	2,995		—
1820	10,095		237.1%
1830	18,826		86.5%
1840	22,965		22.0%
1850	24,419		6.3%
1860	24,208		−0.9%
1870	24,584		1.6%
1880	27,500		11.9%
1890	27,868		1.3%
1900	29,246		4.9%
1910	30,307		3.6%
1920	36,369		20.0%
1930	42,682		17.4%
1940	46,660		9.3%
1950	63,984		37.1%
1960	91,798		43.5%
1970	125,868		37.1%
1980	135,856		7.9%
1990	142,585		5.0%
2000	152,061		6.6%
2010	161,419		6.2%
2020	161,791		0.2%
2025 (est.)	163,404	▲	1.0%
U.S. Decennial Census; 1790–1960 1900–1990; 1990–2000 2020

=== 2020 census ===
As of the 2020 census, the county had a population of 161,791. The median age was 39.8 years. 18.4% of residents were under the age of 18 and 17.9% of residents were 65 years of age or older. For every 100 females, there were 95.0 males, and for every 100 females age 18 and over, there were 92.9 males age 18 and over.

The racial makeup of the county was 86.4% White, 5.0% Black or African American, 0.2% American Indian and Alaska Native, 2.1% Asian, <0.1% Native Hawaiian and Pacific Islander, 0.8% from some other race, and 5.5% from two or more races. Hispanic or Latino residents of any race comprised 2.2% of the population.

62.0% of residents lived in urban areas, while 38.0% lived in rural areas.

There were 65,624 households in the county, of which 24.8% had children under the age of 18 living in them. Of all households, 46.5% were married-couple households, 19.8% were households with a male householder and no spouse or partner present, and 26.1% were households with a female householder and no spouse or partner present. About 28.9% of all households were made up of individuals and 11.2% had someone living alone who was 65 years of age or older.

There were 70,672 housing units, of which 7.1% were vacant. Among occupied housing units, 68.9% were owner-occupied and 31.1% were renter-occupied. The homeowner vacancy rate was 1.1% and the rental vacancy rate was 8.1%.

=== Racial and ethnic composition ===
Portage County, Ohio – Racial and ethnic composition Note: the US Census treats Hispanic/Latino as an ethnic category. This table excludes Latinos from the racial categories and assigns them to a separate category. Hispanics/Latinos may be of any race.
Race / Ethnicity (NH = Non-Hispanic)	Pop 1980	Pop 1990	Pop 2000	Pop 2010	Pop 2020	% 1980	% 1990	% 2000	% 2010	% 2020
White alone (NH)	130,450	136,407	142,825	147,527	138,774	96.02%	95.67%	93.93%	91.39%	85.77%
Black or African American alone (NH)	3,529	3,867	4,812	6,611	7,934	2.60%	2.71%	3.16%	4.10%	4.90%
Native American or Alaska Native alone (NH)	185	281	260	274	233	0.14%	0.20%	0.17%	0.17%	0.14%
Asian alone (NH)	672	1,175	1,238	2,283	3,400	0.49%	0.82%	0.81%	1.41%	2.10%
Native Hawaiian or Pacific Islander alone (NH)	x	x	14	33	38	x	x	0.01%	0.02%	0.02%
Other race alone (NH)	252	57	127	145	558	0.19%	0.04%	0.08%	0.09%	0.34%
Mixed race or Multiracial (NH)	x	x	1,692	2,473	7,349	x	x	1.11%	1.53%	4.54%
Hispanic or Latino (any race)	768	798	1,093	2,073	3,505	0.57%	0.56%	0.72%	1.28%	2.17%
Total	135,856	142,585	152,061	161,419	161,791	100.00%	100.00%	100.00%	100.00%	100.00%

=== 2010 census ===
As of the 2010 United States census, there were 161,419 people, 62,222 households, and 40,757 families living in the county. The population density was 331.2 inhabitants per square mile (127.9/km^{2}). There were 67,472 housing units at an average density of 138.4 units per square mile (53.4 units/km^{2}). The racial makeup of the county was 92.3% white, 4.1% black or African American, 1.4% Asian, 0.2% American Indian, 0.3% from other races, and 1.7% from two or more races. Those of Hispanic or Latino origin made up 1.3% of the population. In terms of ancestry, 30.7% were German, 17.1% were Irish, 11.5% were English, 11.0% were Italian, 6.6% were Polish, and 5.7% were American.

Of the 62,222 households, 29.6% had children under the age of 18 living with them, 50.1% were married couples living together, 10.9% had a female householder with no husband present, 34.5% were non-families, and 25.4% of all households were made up of individuals. The average household size was 2.47 and the average family size was 2.96. The median age was 37.4 years.

The median income for a household in the county was $50,447 and the median income for a family was $65,306. Males had a median income of $46,014 versus $34,250 for females. The per capita income for the county was $25,097. About 8.1% of families and 13.5% of the population were below the poverty line, including 16.2% of those under age 18 and 4.4% of those age 65 or over.

=== 2000 census ===
As of the census of 2000, there were 152,061 people, 56,449 households, and 39,175 families living in the county. The population density was 309 inhabitants per square mile (119/km^{2}). There were 60,096 housing units at an average density of 122 units per square mile (47/km^{2}). The racial makeup of the county was 94.40% White, 3.18% Black or African American, 0.18% Native American, 0.82% Asian, 0.01% Pacific Islander, 0.22% from other races, and 1.19% from two or more races. 0.72% of the population were Hispanic or Latino of any race. 23.5% were of German, 11.0% Irish, 9.9% Italian, 9.7% English, 9.7% American and 5.2% Polish ancestry according to Census 2000. 96.1% spoke English and 1.2% Spanish as their first language.

There were 56,449 households, out of which 32.30% had children under the age of 18 living with them, 55.60% were married couples living together, 10.10% had a female householder with no husband present, and 30.60% were non-families. 23.30% of all households were made up of individuals, and 7.40% had someone living alone who was 65 years of age or older. The average household size was 2.56 and the average family size was 3.03.

In the county, the population was spread out, with 23.70% under the age of 18, 14.30% from 18 to 24, 28.60% from 25 to 44, 22.30% from 45 to 64, and 11.00% who were 65 years of age or older. The median age was 34 years. For every 100 females, there were 95.40 males. For every 100 females age 18 and over, there were 92.40 males.

The median income for a household in the county was $44,347, and the median income for a family was $52,820. Males had a median income of $37,434 versus $26,232 for females. The per capita income for the county was $20,428. About 5.90% of families and 9.30% of the population were below the poverty line, including 9.90% of those under age 18 and 5.70% of those age 65 or over.

Using the Gini coefficient to measure household inequality, Portage County received a .43 in 2012. In 2013 16.1% of the population, or 25,196 people, were poor or impoverished. The county saw an increase in its poor population, as this can be compared to a 9.3% poverty rate (13,395 people) in 1999.

== Government ==
As of January 2025, the following officials are in county-wide elected office:

Portage County Elected Officials
Position	Name	Party
Commissioner	Michael Tinlin	Republican
Commissioner	Jill Crawford	Republican
Commissioner	Sabrina Christian-Bennett	Republican
Auditor	Matt Kelly	Republican
Prosecuting Attorney	Connie Lewandowski	Republican
Clerk of Courts	Jill Fankhauser	Democrat
Sheriff	Bruce Zuchowski Jr.	Republican
Recorder	Lori Calcei	Republican
Treasurer	Joseph Bica	Republican
Engineer	Larry D. Jenkins Jr.	Democrat
Coroner	Dean Deperro	Democrat

== Politics ==
From 1992 to 2012, Portage County had been reliably Democratic. Following a trend seen throughout large parts of Ohio, Donald Trump won Portage County by 9.87 points in 2016 and then again by 12.44 points in 2020, becoming the first Republican in almost three decades to win the county, the last time being George H. W. Bush in 1988.

United States presidential election results for Portage County, Ohio
Year	Republican		Democratic		Third party(ies)	
Year	No.	%	No.	%	No.	%
1856	2,983	58.94%	2,072	40.94%	6	0.12%
1860	3,065	59.34%	1,970	38.14%	130	2.52%
1864	3,475	64.40%	1,921	35.60%	0	0.00%
1868	3,604	60.41%	2,362	39.59%	0	0.00%
1872	3,478	58.03%	2,438	40.68%	77	1.28%
1876	3,712	54.92%	3,006	44.47%	41	0.61%
1880	3,990	54.97%	3,147	43.35%	122	1.68%
1884	3,931	52.11%	3,273	43.39%	339	4.49%
1888	3,880	52.36%	3,260	43.99%	270	3.64%
1892	3,310	48.83%	2,953	43.57%	515	7.60%
1896	4,073	50.01%	3,995	49.05%	76	0.93%
1900	4,311	52.68%	3,651	44.61%	222	2.71%
1904	4,712	62.49%	2,486	32.97%	343	4.55%
1908	4,129	51.16%	3,625	44.91%	317	3.93%
1912	1,162	15.73%	2,855	38.65%	3,370	45.62%
1916	3,142	40.90%	4,269	55.56%	272	3.54%
1920	8,231	58.99%	5,405	38.74%	317	2.27%
1924	8,583	62.43%	2,994	21.78%	2,172	15.80%
1928	12,086	71.31%	4,756	28.06%	106	0.63%
1932	9,586	47.98%	9,662	48.36%	733	3.67%
1936	8,035	35.77%	13,798	61.43%	630	2.80%
1940	11,777	48.14%	12,687	51.86%	0	0.00%
1944	12,284	49.50%	12,533	50.50%	0	0.00%
1948	11,621	48.67%	11,987	50.21%	268	1.12%
1952	17,168	55.88%	13,553	44.12%	0	0.00%
1956	18,943	59.07%	13,128	40.93%	0	0.00%
1960	19,634	51.45%	18,528	48.55%	0	0.00%
1964	10,842	31.75%	23,308	68.25%	0	0.00%
1968	15,064	41.27%	16,348	44.78%	5,093	13.95%
1972	23,294	51.76%	20,769	46.15%	939	2.09%
1976	17,927	40.91%	24,417	55.72%	1,480	3.38%
1980	22,829	47.37%	20,570	42.69%	4,791	9.94%
1984	29,536	57.14%	21,719	42.02%	432	0.84%
1988	26,334	50.18%	25,607	48.79%	539	1.03%
1992	18,447	29.69%	26,325	42.37%	17,363	27.94%
1996	18,939	32.52%	29,441	50.55%	9,858	16.93%
2000	28,271	44.95%	31,446	49.99%	3,182	5.06%
2004	35,583	46.42%	40,675	53.07%	389	0.51%
2008	34,822	44.41%	41,856	53.39%	1,724	2.20%
2012	35,242	46.14%	39,453	51.65%	1,689	2.21%
2016	39,971	52.07%	32,397	42.20%	4,394	5.72%
2020	45,990	55.39%	35,661	42.95%	1,371	1.65%
2024	47,681	57.02%	34,759	41.57%	1,179	1.41%

United States Senate election results for Portage County, Ohio1
Year	Republican		Democratic		Third party(ies)	
Year	No.	%	No.	%	No.	%
2024	42,163	51.27%	37,082	45.09%	3,000	3.65%

== Education ==
The county is served by multiple public school districts, private schools, and public libraries, and is home to two institutions of higher education.

=== Libraries ===
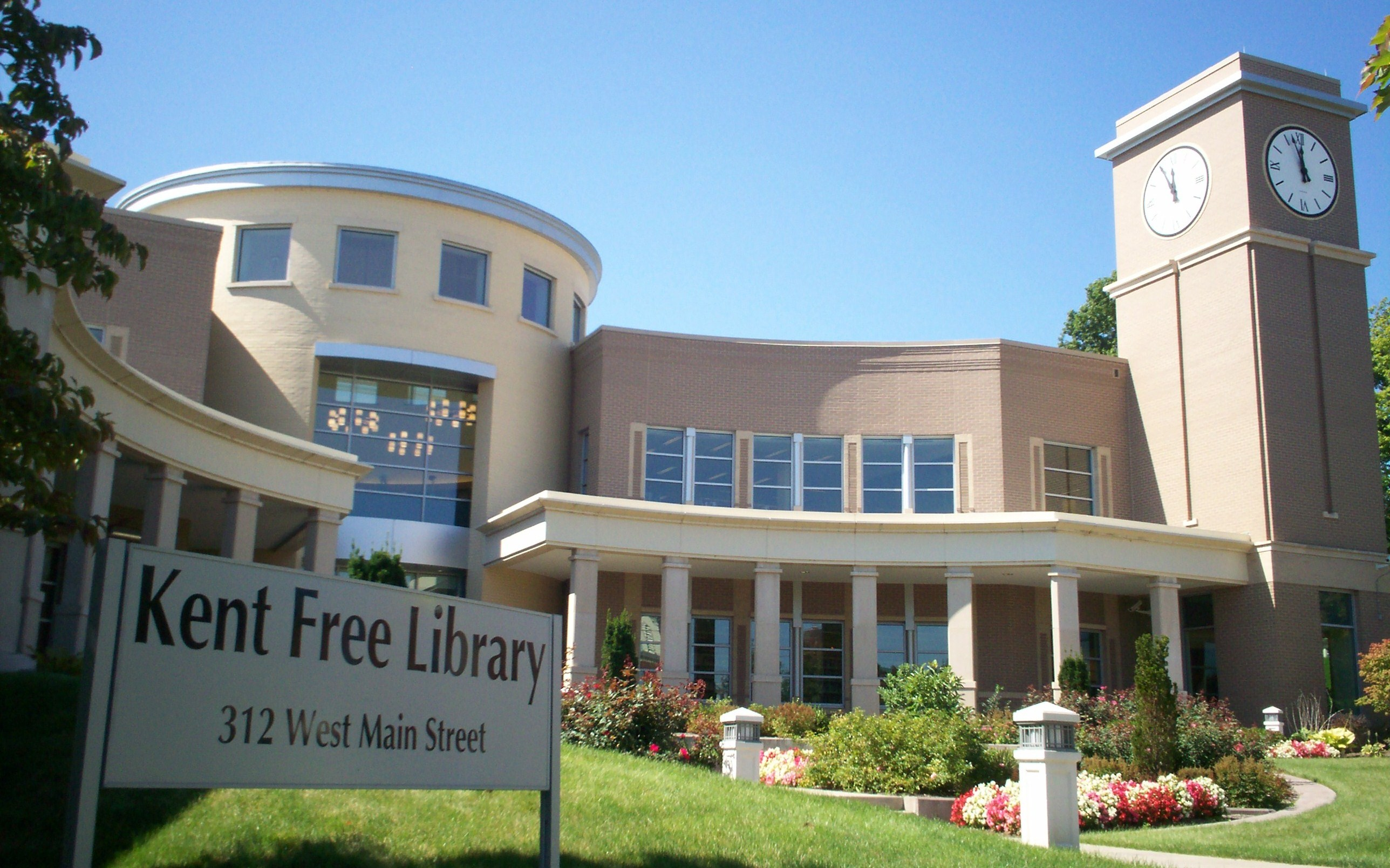
Kent Free Library in Kent

The Portage County Library Consortium is a library consortium consisting of Kent Free Library in Kent, Reed Memorial Library in Ravenna, and the six branches of the Portage County Library District, located in Aurora, Brimfield, Garrettsville, Randolph, Streetsboro, and Windham. The consortium allows patrons of any member library to use their library card at another consortium location or request materials housed at another library. Through the SearchOhio database, the consortium is connected to OhioLINK, which provides local access to the State Library of Ohio and dozens of university and college libraries across the state.

The county is also home to the Kent State University Libraries in Kent, an academic library system with a collection of over 2.5 million volumes. The KSU system, one of three members of the Association of Research Libraries in Ohio, includes the 12-story main library and individual libraries for architecture, fashion, performing arts, and maps on the main campus in Kent. It also includes individual libraries at each of the university's seven regional campuses in Northeast Ohio.

=== Public school districts ===
Portage County is home to eleven public school districts.

District	Location	Communities served
Aurora City School District	Aurora	Aurora, small part of Reminderville
Crestwood Local School District	Mantua	Mantua, Mantua Township, Hiram, most of Hiram Township, most of Shalersville Township
James A. Garfield Local School District	Garrettsville	Garrettsville, Nelson Township, Freedom Township, part of Hiram Township, small part of Charlestown Township
Field Local School District	Brimfield	Most of Brimfield and Suffield Townships, parts of Tallmadge and Kent annexed from Brimfield
Kent City School District	Kent	Sugar Bush Knolls, most of Kent and Franklin Township, small portion of Streetsboro
Ravenna School District	Ravenna	Ravenna, Ravenna Township, small portion of Shalersville Township
Rootstown Local School District	Rootstown	Rootstown Township and small portion of Brimfield Township
Southeast Local School District	Palmyra	Edinburg Township, Palmyra Township, Paris Township, most of Charlestown Township, most of Deerfield Township
Streetsboro City School District	Streetsboro	most of Streetsboro
Waterloo Local School District	Atwater	Atwater Township, Randolph Township, small portion of Deerfield Township
Windham Exempted Village School District	Windham	Windham, Windham Township

Map of school districts in Portage County with township and municipal boundaries superimposed as of 2022.

In addition, there are parts of five neighboring districts which serve portions of Portage County residents.

District	Location	Communities served in Portage County
Lake Local School District	Uniontown	small part of Suffield Township
Mogadore Local School District	Mogadore	Mogadore, small part of Suffield Township
Springfield Local School District	Springfield	small part of Suffield Township
Stow-Munroe Falls City School District	Stow	small part of Franklin Township
Tallmadge City School District	Tallmadge	small part of Tallmadge in Portage County
West Branch Local School District	Beloit	small part of Deerfield Township

Portage County also has two public schools that serve students from multiple districts:

- Maplewood Career Center in Ravenna, a joint vocational school for students in grades 11 and 12 from nine of the county's school districts (all but Kent and Aurora) and Mogadore.
- Bio-Med Science Academy, a year-round public science, technology, engineering, mathematics, and medicine (STEM+M) high school located on the campus of Northeast Ohio Medical University in Rootstown with campuses in Ravenna and Shalersville. The academy has students enrolled from Portage County and adjacent counties.

=== Private schools ===
- Crossroads Christian Academy, a Christian school for grades K4–12 operated by and housed at First Baptist Church in Streetsboro
- St. Joseph School, a Roman Catholic school for grades PK–8 in St. Joseph, affiliated with the Diocese of Youngstown
- St. Patrick School, a Roman Catholic school for grades K–8 in Kent, affiliated with the Diocese of Youngstown
- Valley Christian Academy, a Christian school for grades PK–8 in Aurora

=== Higher education ===
Portage County is home to three institutions of higher learning:

- Kent State University, located in Kent; a large regional public research university with around 40,000 students. It serves as the county's largest employer.
- Hiram College, located in Hiram in northeastern Portage County; a small liberal arts college of around 1,200 students.
- Northeast Ohio Medical University (NEOMED), located in Rootstown, in the south-central part of the county. It is a public medical school and a consortium of Kent State University, the University of Akron, Youngstown State University, and Cleveland State University, with colleges of medicine, pharmacy, and graduate studies.

== Culture ==
=== Theater ===
- Kent Stage

=== Museums ===
- Kelso House Museum, Brimfield
- Kent Historical Society Museum, Kent
- Kent State University Museum, Kent
- Kent State School of Art Galleries, Kent
- Cowrie-Lowrie-Beatty Portage County Historical Society Museum, Ravenna

=== Media ===
- Record-Courier, a newspaper based in Ravenna that covers news for the entire county online and in print
- The Portager, an online news source based in Randolph that covers the entire county
- KentStater, an online news source from Kent State University independent student media outlets The Kent Stater and TV2
- Weekly Villager, online news source based in Garrettsville with news from Portage, Geauga, and Trumbull counties

== Transportation ==
=== Airport ===
The Portage County Regional Airport is located in Shalersville Township, three nautical miles (3.5 mi; 5.6 km) north of Ravenna's central business district.

=== Major highways ===
- I-76
- I-80 / Ohio Turnpike
- I-480
- US 224
- US 422
- SR 5
- SR 14
- SR 43
- SR 44
- SR 59
- SR 82
- SR 88
- SR 183
- SR 225
- SR 261
- SR 282
- SR 303
- SR 305
- SR 306
- SR 700

== Communities ==
Map of Portage County municipal, township, and census-designated place labels

Portage County is arranged as a 4 x 5 grid of 20 rectangles and contains 18 unincorporated townships, and all or part of five cities and six villages. Under Ohio law, there are two types of incorporated municipal jurisdictions: cities and villages; and any territory within a county that is not part of an incorporated municipality is part of a township. Townships have limited local government and services.

In addition to the cities, village, and townships, the United States Census Bureau has four census-designated places (CDP) in Portage County. These CDPs are for statistical purposes only and have no government or official boundaries separate from the township they are located in. There are also 17 additional named places in the county. All 17 places are considered part of whatever jurisdiction they are located in (township or municipality) and have no formal boundaries or additional government of their own.

Camp James A. Garfield, formerly known as the Ravenna Training and Logistics Site and commonly known as the Ravenna Arsenal, occupies much of the land in Charlestown, Paris, and Windham townships, as well as a small part of Freedom Township. While the portions of Camp Garfield are still considered part of the various townships they cover, the land is under the jurisdiction of the US federal government.

=== Cities ===
- Aurora
- Kent
- Ravenna (county seat)
- Streetsboro
- Tallmadge

=== Villages ===
- Garrettsville
- Hiram
- Mantua
- Mogadore
- Sugar Bush Knolls
- Windham

=== Townships ===
- Atwater
- Brimfield
- Charlestown
- Deerfield
- Edinburg
- Franklin
- Freedom
- Hiram
- Mantua
- Nelson
- Palmyra
- Paris
- Randolph
- Ravenna
- Rootstown
- Shalersville
- Suffield
- Windham

=== Census-designated places ===
- Atwater in Atwater Township
- Brady Lake in Franklin Township
- Brimfield in Brimfield Township
- Suffield in Suffield Township

=== Unincorporated communities ===
- Black Horse
- Campbellsport
- Cobbs Corners
- Diamond
- Drakesburg
- Earlville
- Freedom Station
- Hiram Rapids
- Lloyd
- Mahoning
- Mishler
- Moran
- New Milford
- St. Joseph
- Twin Lakes
- Wayland
- Yale

== Notable people ==
- Nettie Sanford Chapin (1830–1901), teacher, historian, author, newspaper publisher, suffragist
- Peter J. Barber (1830-1905), architect, known for his work in Santa Barbara, California

== See also ==
- National Register of Historic Places listings in Portage County, Ohio
- Ohio county government
