= West Branch State Park =

State park in Ohio, United States

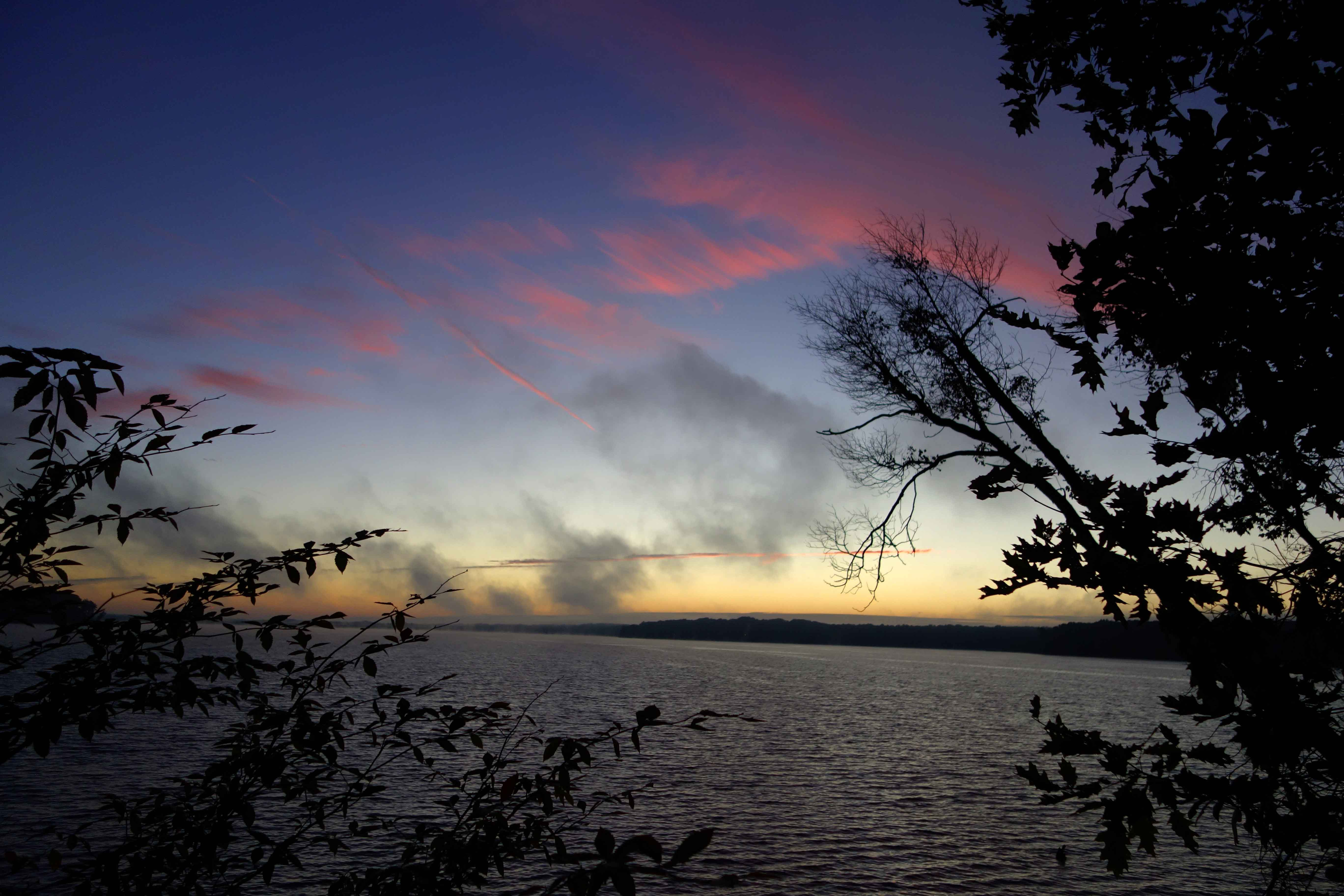
- Sunset, West Branch State Park, October 2015

- Location within Ohio Location within the United States
- Location: Portage County, Ohio, United States
- Coordinates: 41°08′35″N 81°06′29″W
- Area: Land: 5,379 acres (2,177 ha); Water: 2,650 acres (1,070 ha)
- Elevation: 981 feet (299 m)
- Established: 1966
- Administrator: Ohio Department of Natural Resources
- Designation: Ohio state park
- Website: West Branch State Park

West Branch State Park is a public recreation area located east of Ravenna, Ohio, on the west branch of the Mahoning River. The park encompasses more than 5,000 acres (2,000 ha) of land and 2,650 acres (1,070 ha) of water mainly in Charlestown, Edinburg, and Paris townships, with additional land in neighboring Palmyra, Ravenna, and Rootstown townships. Activities include boating, fishing, and swimming on the Michael J. Kirwan Reservoir, hiking, and camping.

== History ==
In early days, Native Americans and some early settlers used the Mahoning River as a source for salt. Captain John Campbell who led militia in the War of 1812 opened the oldest brick land office building around 1810. Before the reservoir was made, the building was moved out of the area.

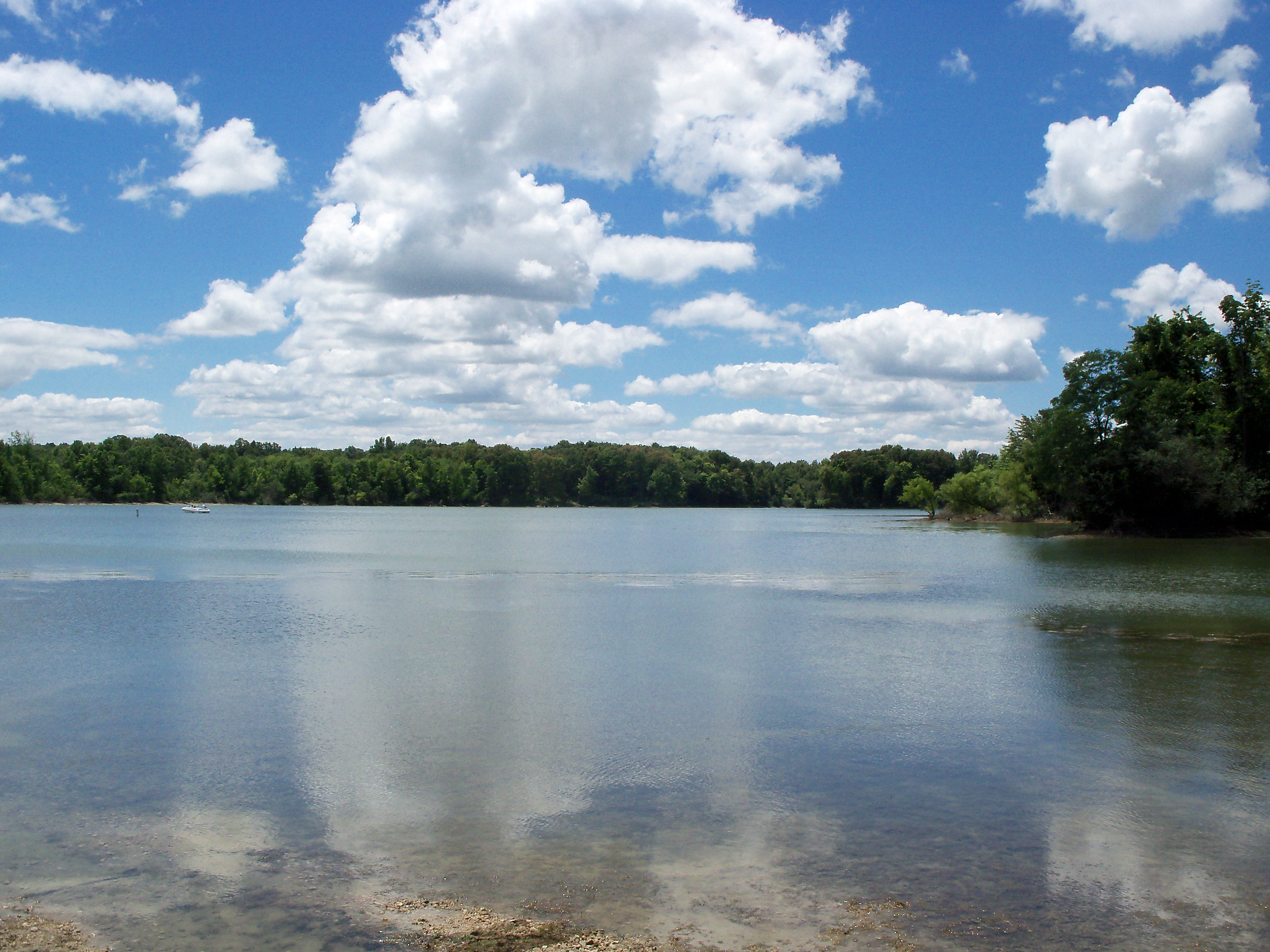
Kirwan Reservoir

The U.S. Army Corps of Engineers constructed the Michael J. Kirwan Reservoir in 1965. The reservoir was developed for recreation, water supply, flood control, and fish and wildlife management. The U.S. Army Corps of Engineers then leased the land to the state of Ohio to be used as a state park. West Branch State Park was officially opened in 1966.

== Recreation ==
The park offers swimming, fishing, camping, boating, 14 miles (23 km) of hiking trails, 20 miles (32 km) of bridle trails, and 12 miles (19 km) of mountain biking trails, winter recreation, and seasonal hunting for deer, small game, and waterfowl.
