= Mahoning, Ohio =

Former settlement in Ohio, U.S.

Coordinates: 41°15′32″N 81°02′55″W

Mahoning is a former settlement in Portage County, in the U.S. state of Ohio. It was located at the present-day intersection of North Main Street and Ohio State Route 82 in northern Windham Township, north of the village of Windham.

== History ==
Mahoning is a name derived from the Delaware language meaning "salt lick". A post office called Mahoning was established in 1878, and remained in operation until 1913. Besides the post office, Mahoning had a station on the Cleveland and Mahoning Valley Railroad.
