= Freedom Township, Portage County, Ohio =

Township in Ohio, US

Freedom Township
- Civil township
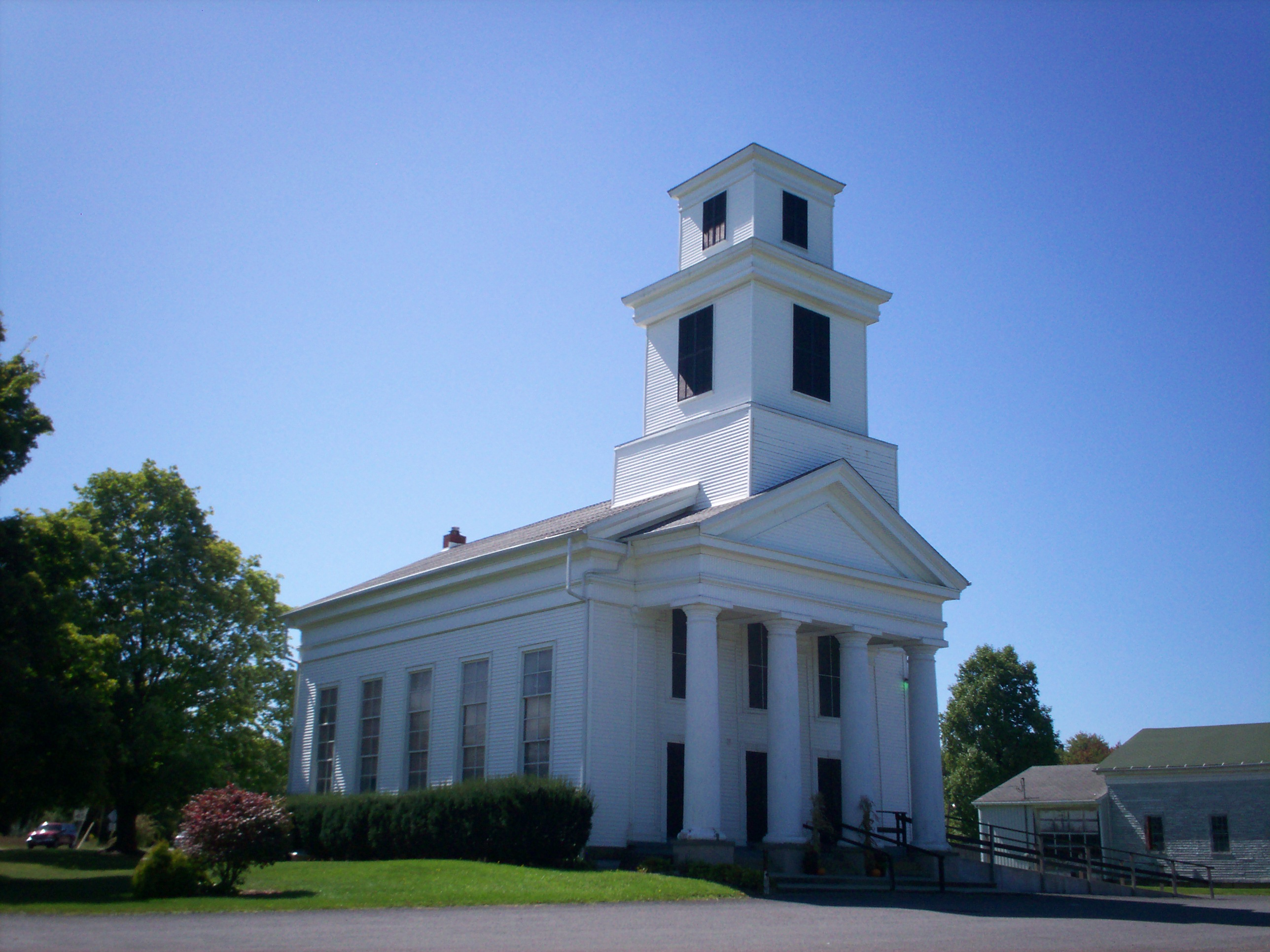
- Historic Freedom Congregational Church at Freedom Center
- Interactive map of Freedom Township
- Location within Ohio Location within the United States
- Coordinates: 41°14′42″N 81°8′48″W
- Country: United States
- State: Ohio
- County: Portage

Area
  - Total: 23.9 sq mi (62.0 km^{2})
  - Land: 23.9 sq mi (62.0 km^{2})
  - Water: 0 sq mi (0.0 km^{2})
- Elevation: 1,178 ft (359 m)

Population (2020)
  - Total: 2,649
  - Density: 111/sq mi (42.7/km^{2})
- Time zone: UTC-5 (Eastern (EST))
  - Summer (DST): UTC-4 (EDT)
- ZIP code: 44288
- Area code: 330
- FIPS code: 39-28742
- GNIS feature ID: 1086828
- Website: https://freedomtwp-pc.org/

Freedom Township is one of the eighteen townships of Portage County, Ohio, United States. The 2020 census found 2,649 people in the township.

== Geography ==
Located in the northeastern part of the county, it borders the following townships:

- Hiram Township - north
- Windham Township - east
- Paris Township - southeast corner
- Charlestown Township - south
- Ravenna Township - southwest corner
- Shalersville Township - west
- Mantua Township - northwest corner

A small part of the village of Garrettsville was formed from far northeastern Freedom Township.

Formed from Town 4, Range 7 of the Connecticut Western Reserve, Freedom Township covers an area of 24 sq mi (62 km^{2}). The Ravenna Training and Logistics Site covers the southeast corner of the township.

== Name and history ==
Freedom Township was settled in 1818 and organized in 1825, one of the last townships in Portage County to be organized. The first settler was Charles Paine, son of General Edward Paine, whom Painesville, Ohio, is named after. It was said to have been named by Charles Paine's wife after the idea of freedom. Previously it had been referred to as "North Rootstown" since the original proprietor was Ephraim Root. A post office called Freedom was established in 1826 at the town center, and remained in operation until 1903, while another post office for Freedom Station was established in 1864 and remained in operation until 1957. Freedom Station was a station and shipping point on the New York, Pennsylvania and Ohio Railroad. The unincorporated community of Drakesburg is located in the eastern part of the township along Ohio State Route 303. It is named for settler Orasumus Drake, who arrived in 1829.

Statewide, other Freedom Townships are located in Henry and Wood counties.

== Government ==
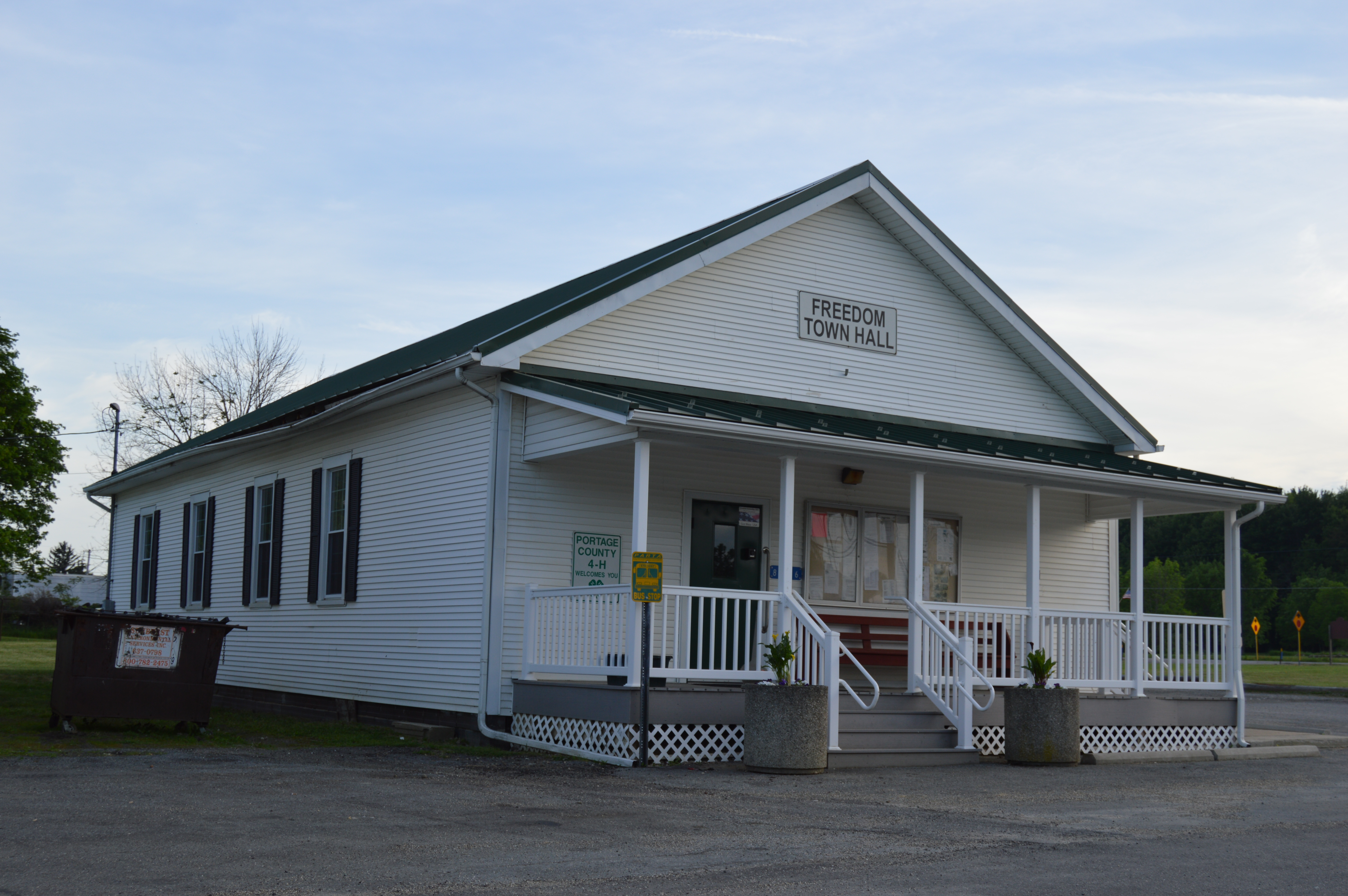
Freedom Town Hall

The township is governed by a three-member board of trustees, who are elected in November of odd-numbered years to a four-year term beginning on the following January 1. Two are elected in the year after the presidential election and one is elected in the year before it. There is also an elected township fiscal officer, who serves a four-year term beginning on April 1 of the year after the election, which is held in November of the year before the presidential election. Vacancies in the fiscal officership or on the board of trustees are filled by the remaining trustees.
