= Mishler, Ohio =

Former settlement in Ohio, U.S.

Coordinates: 40°59′58″N 81°21′42″W

Mishler is a former settlement in Portage County, in the U.S. state of Ohio. It was located in the southern part of Suffield Township along Mishler Road, east of present-day Ohio State Route 43.

== History ==
A post office called Mishler was established in 1882, and remained in operation until 1917. The Mishler family settled at the site in the mid-19th century.
