= Paris Township, Portage County, Ohio =

Township in Ohio, US

- Township
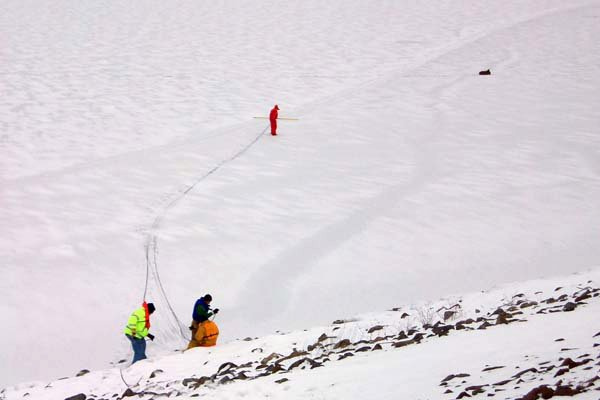
- Ice rescue by township fire department at dam of Michael J Kirwan Reservoir

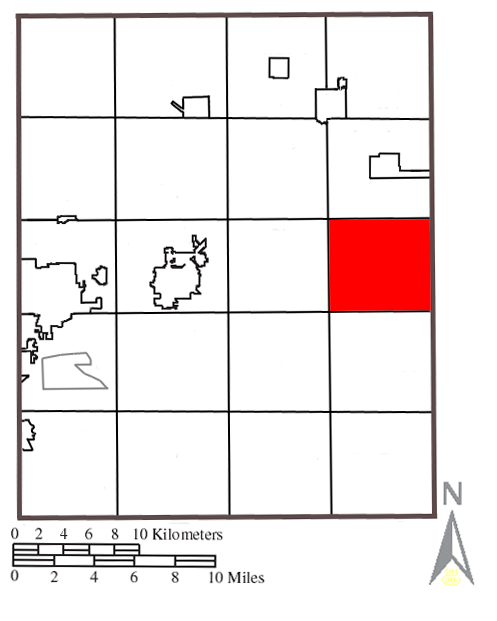
- Location within Portage County
- Coordinates: 41°10′13″N 81°3′40″W
- Country: United States
- State: Ohio
- County: Portage

Area
  - Total: 23.9 sq mi (61.9 km^{2})
  - Land: 22.7 sq mi (58.7 km^{2})
  - Water: 1.2 sq mi (3.1 km^{2})
- Elevation: 968 ft (295 m)

Population (2020)
  - Total: 1,648
  - Density: 73/sq mi (28.1/km^{2})
- Time zone: UTC-5 (Eastern (EST))
  - Summer (DST): UTC-4 (EDT)
- FIPS code: 39-59822
- GNIS feature ID: 1086835
- Website: https://paris-township.com/WP2019/

Paris Township is one of the eighteen townships of Portage County, Ohio, United States. The 2020 census found 1,648 people in the township.

== Geography ==
Located in the eastern part of the county, it borders the following townships:

- Windham Township - north
- Braceville Township, Trumbull County - northeast corner
- Newton Township, Trumbull County - east
- Milton Township, Mahoning County - southeast corner
- Palmyra Township - south
- Edinburg Township - southwest corner
- Charlestown Township - west
- Freedom Township - northwest corner

No municipalities are located in Paris Township, although the unincorporated community of Wayland lies in the western part of the township.

Formed from the Connecticut Western Reserve, Paris Township covers an area of 23 sq mi (60 km^{2}). The Ravenna Training and Logistics Site covers the northern part of the township.

== Name and history ==
Paris Township was established around 1810. The community derives its name from Paris, New York. Variant names were Parisville and Paris Center. A post office called Parisville was established in 1827, and remained in operation until 1890. Statewide, other Paris Townships are located in Stark and Union counties.

== Government ==
The township is governed by a three-member board of trustees, who are elected in November of odd-numbered years to a four-year term beginning on the following January 1. Two are elected in the year after the presidential election and one is elected in the year before it. There is also an elected township fiscal officer, who serves a four-year term beginning on April 1 of the year after the election, which is held in November of the year before the presidential election. Vacancies in the fiscal officership or on the board of trustees are filled by the remaining trustees.
