= Brimfield Township, Ohio =

Township in Ohio, US

Brimfield Township
- Civil township
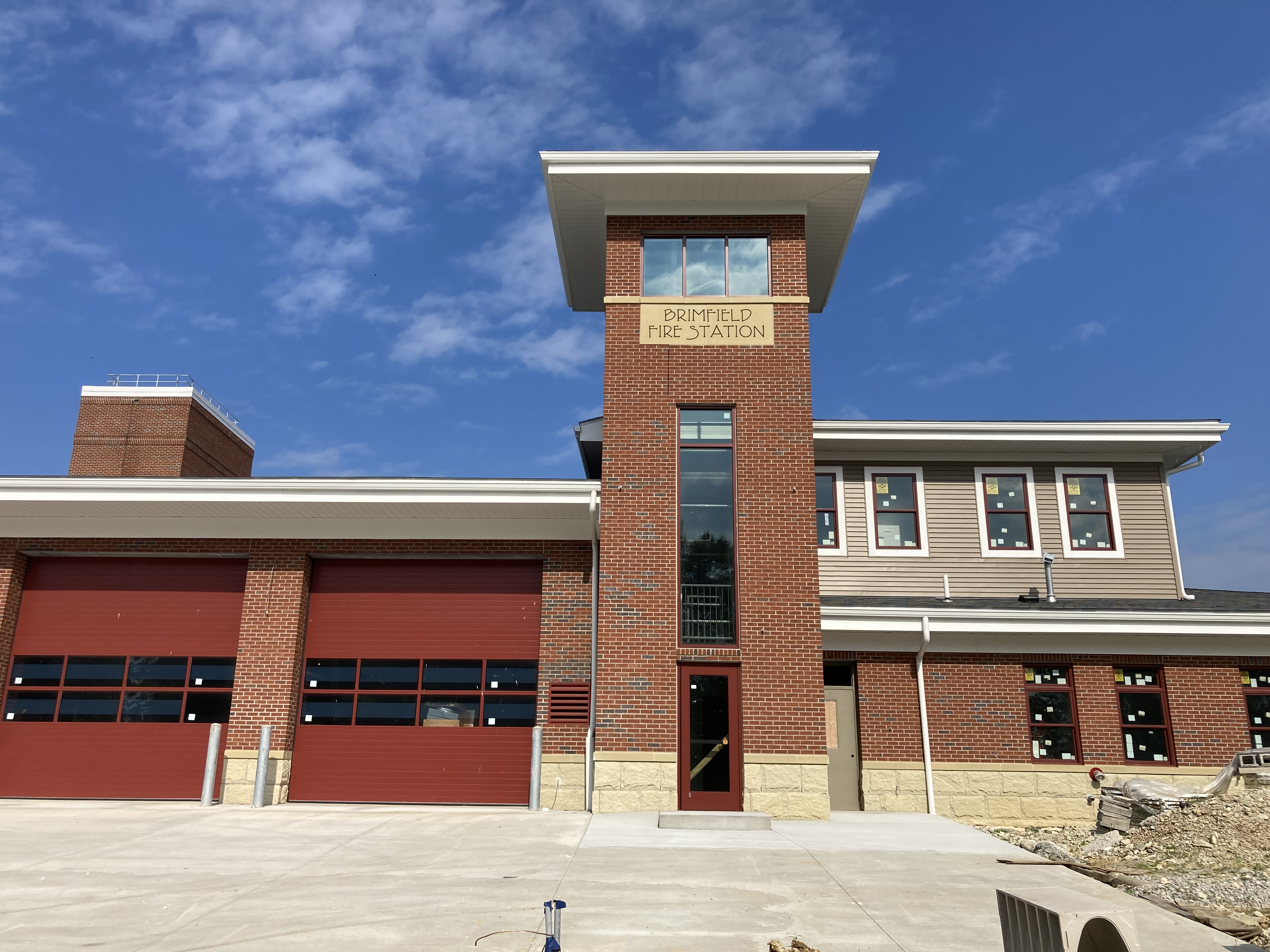

- Flag
- Motto: Pathway to Portage County
- Interactive map of Brimfield Township
- Location within Ohio Location within the United States
- Coordinates: 41°6′23″N 81°20′46″W
- Country: United States
- State: Ohio
- County: Portage
- Settled: 1816
- Established: 1818
- Named after: Brimfield, Massachusetts

Government
  - Type: Civil township

Area
  - Total: 21.4 sq mi (55.3 km^{2})
  - Land: 20.5 sq mi (53.2 km^{2})
  - Water: 0.81 sq mi (2.1 km^{2})
- Elevation: 1,150 ft (350 m)

Population (2020)
  - Total: 11,352
  - Density: 531.9/sq mi (205.4/km^{2})
- Time zone: UTC-5 (Eastern (EST))
  - Summer (DST): UTC-4 (EDT)
- ZIP codes: 44240, 44260, 44278, 44266
- Area codes: 330, 234
- FIPS code: 39-08840
- GNIS feature ID: 1086823
- Website: brimfieldohio.gov

Brimfield Township is one of the eighteen townships in Portage County, Ohio, United States. The 2020 census found 11,352 people in the township.

== Geography ==
Located in the southwestern part of the county, it borders the following townships and cities:

- Franklin Township - north
- Kent - north
- Ravenna Township - northeast corner
- Rootstown Township - east
- Randolph Township - southeast corner
- Suffield Township - south
- Springfield Township, Summit County - southwest corner
- Tallmadge - west
- Stow - northwest corner

The census-designated place of Brimfield is located in the center of the township.

In addition, parts of two neighboring cities cover land that was once part of the township:

- Part of the city of Kent, in the north
- Part of the city of Tallmadge, in the west

Brimfield Township covers a total area of 21.4 square miles (55 km^{2}) of which 20.5 square miles (53 km^{2}) is land.

== Name and history ==
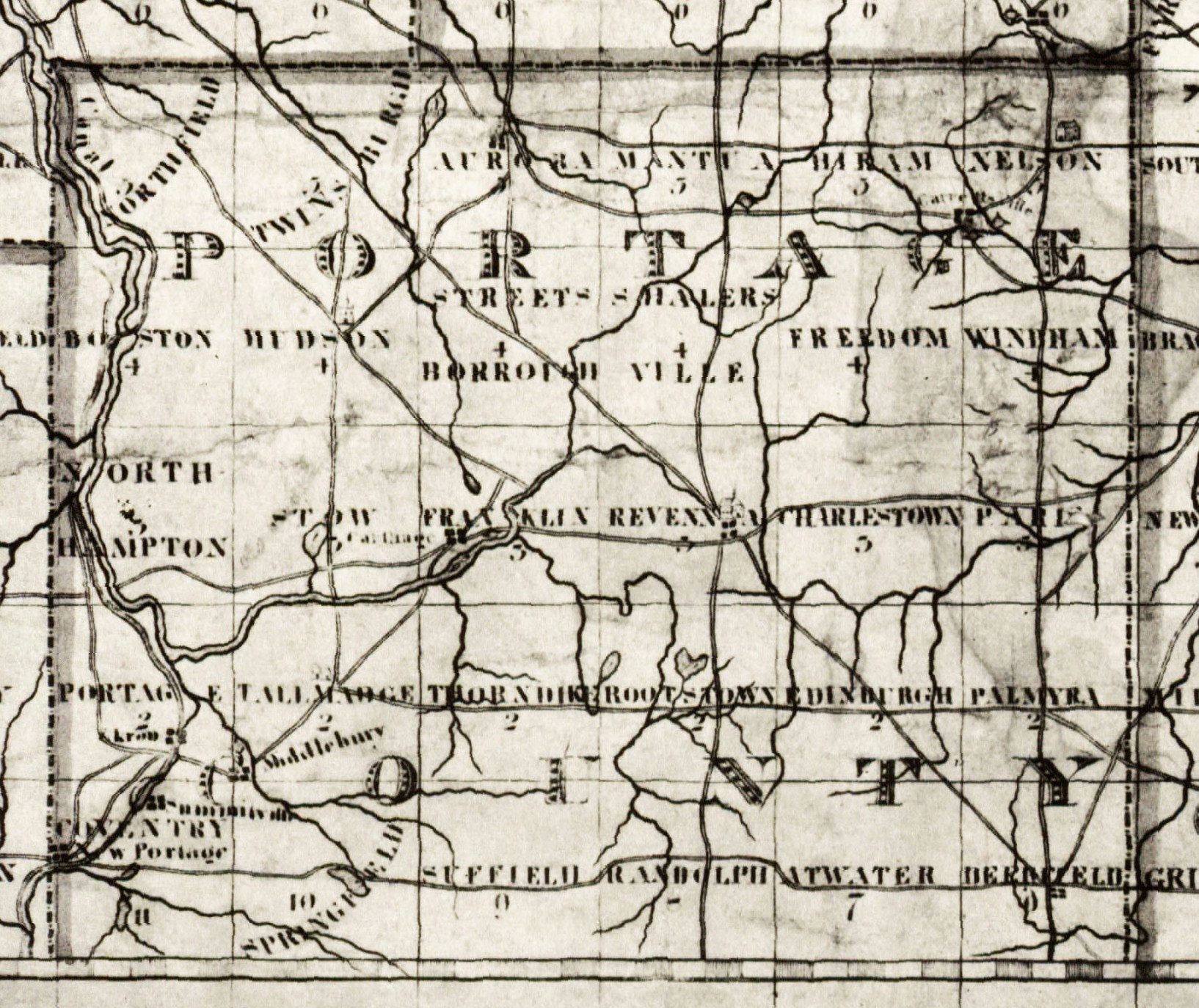
1826 map of Portage County with Brimfield labeled by its former name "Thorndike".

The township is named after the town of Brimfield, Massachusetts, and is the only Brimfield Township in Ohio. It was formed from survey township Town 2, Range 9 of the Connecticut Western Reserve. The original proprietors were Israel Thorndike of Boston and John Wyles of Hartford, Connecticut, both of whom came to the area in 1816 to view their land and divide it. While neither settled in Brimfield, Thorndike sent his nephew Henry Thorndike to act as his agent and settle in the township. Brimfield was known by a succession of different names during the first few years, mostly in reference the swampy land within its borders. It was first known as "Swamptown", followed by "Beartown", "Greenbriar", and "Wylestown", before town leaders agreed to name it "Thorndike" at the establishment of the township government in 1818 after Thorndike had agreed to donate land for a town square. Thorndike never followed through on his agreement, so residents petitioned to have the name changed to "Brimfield" in honor of John Wyles, Jr., who had inherited his father's land interests and at the time resided in Brimfield, Massachusetts. A post office called Brimfield was established in 1834 and remained in operation until 1907.

== Government ==
The township is governed by a three-member board of trustees, who are elected in November of odd-numbered years to a four-year term beginning on the following January 1. Two are elected in the year after the presidential election and one is elected in the year before it. There is also an elected township fiscal officer, who serves a four-year term beginning on April 1 of the year after the election, which is held in November of the year before the presidential election. Vacancies in the fiscal officership or on the board of trustees are filled by the remaining trustees.

== Notable people ==
- Jani Lane, singer and songwriter, grew up in Brimfield
- Janis Mars Wunderlich, ceramic artist, grew up in Brimfield
