= Cobbs Corners, Ohio =

Coordinates: 41.308674°N 81.281174°W

Cobbs Corners is a former settlement in Portage County, in the U.S. state of Ohio. It was located in Mantua Township.

== History ==
A post office called Cobbs Corners was established in 1833, and remained in operation until 1850. The community was named for Henry Cobb, the original owner of the town site and the first postmaster.
