= New Milford, Ohio =

- Unincorporated area
- Location within Ohio Location within the United States
- Coordinates: 41°06′17″N 81°12′52″W
- Country: United States
- State: Ohio
- County: Portage
- Township: Rootstown
- Elevation: 1,125 ft (343 m)
- Time zone: UTC−5 (EST)
  - Summer (DST): UTC−4 (EDT)
- ZIP code: 44272
- Area codes: 330, 234
- GNIS feature ID: 1061170

New Milford, also called Rootstown Station, is an unincorporated area in Portage County, Ohio, United States. It is located in eastern Rootstown Township, immediately south of Interstate 76.

== History ==
A post office called New Milford was established in 1857, and remained in operation until 1967. Besides the post office, New Milford had a railroad station and a gristmill.
