= Camp James A. Garfield =

Ohio Army National Guard military base

Camp James A. Garfield Joint Military Training Center
- Portage / Trumbull counties, Ohio, with entrances in Windham and near Newton Falls
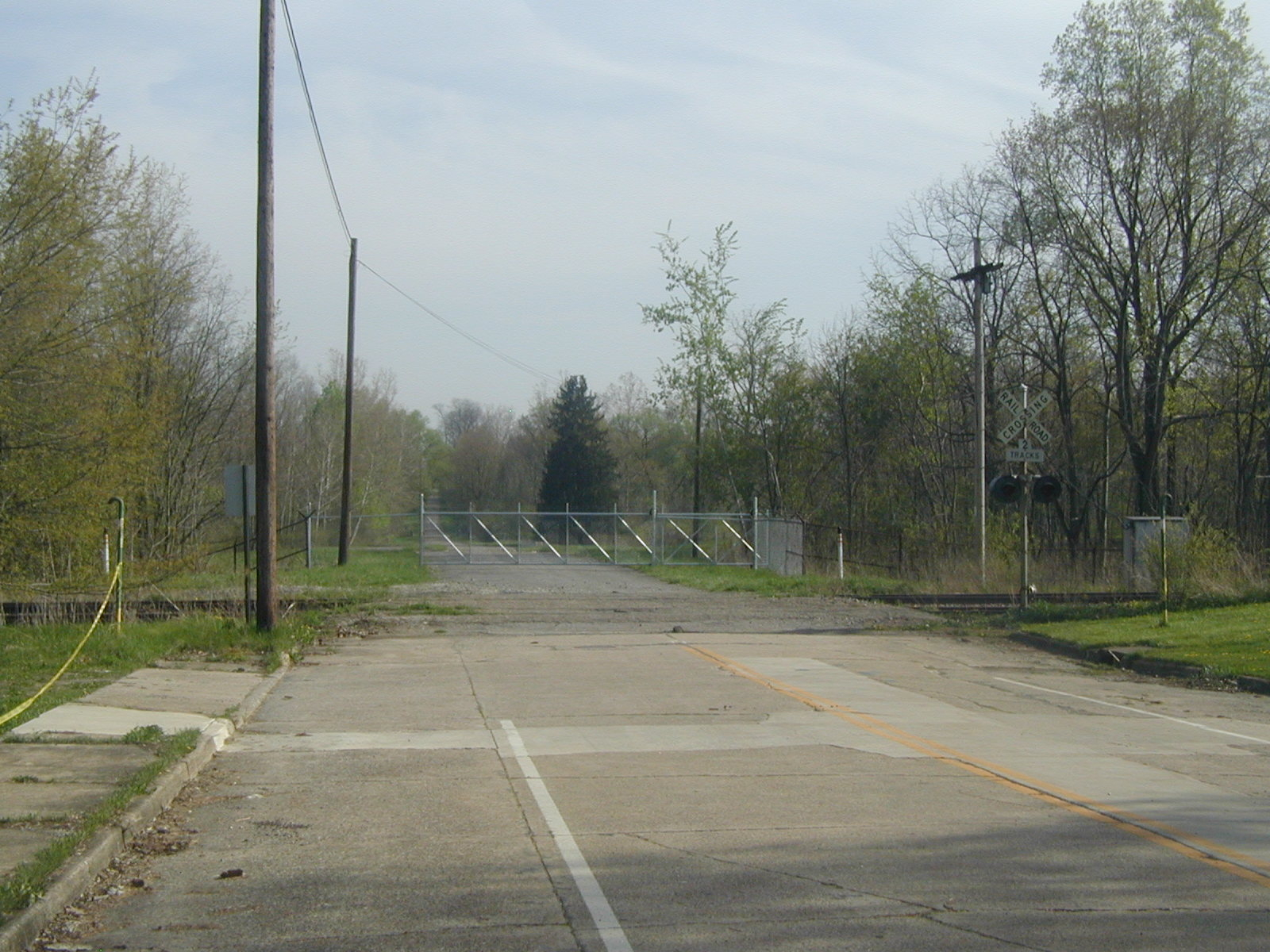
- Entrance to Camp Garfield from Windham, Ohio

Site information
- Type: Ammunition plant (1942–1992); Training facility
- Controlled by: Ohio Army National Guard

Location
- Interactive map
- Interactive map Camp James A. Garfield (the United States)
- Coordinates: 41°12′11″N 81°03′58″W

Site history
- Built: 1942
- In use: 1942–present

James A. Garfield Joint Military Training Center is an Ohio Army National Guard military base in the U.S. state of Ohio located between Ravenna and Newton Falls and adjacent to the village of Windham. It was previously known as Camp Ravenna Joint Military Training Center, the Ravenna Training and Logistics Site, and the Ravenna Army Ammunition Plant (RVAAP) and commonly known as the Ravenna Arsenal. Before its present status as a training facility for the Ohio National Guard, Camp James A. Garfield was a military ammunition production facility for the United States Army. As an arsenal, the facility was at peak operation during World War II and would serve as an ammunitions plant in various roles until 1992. Camp James A. Garfield remains an important part of the history and geography of Portage County. The facility occupies portions of Freedom, Windham, Charlestown, and Paris townships in Portage County, along with part of Braceville Township in Trumbull County.

== History ==
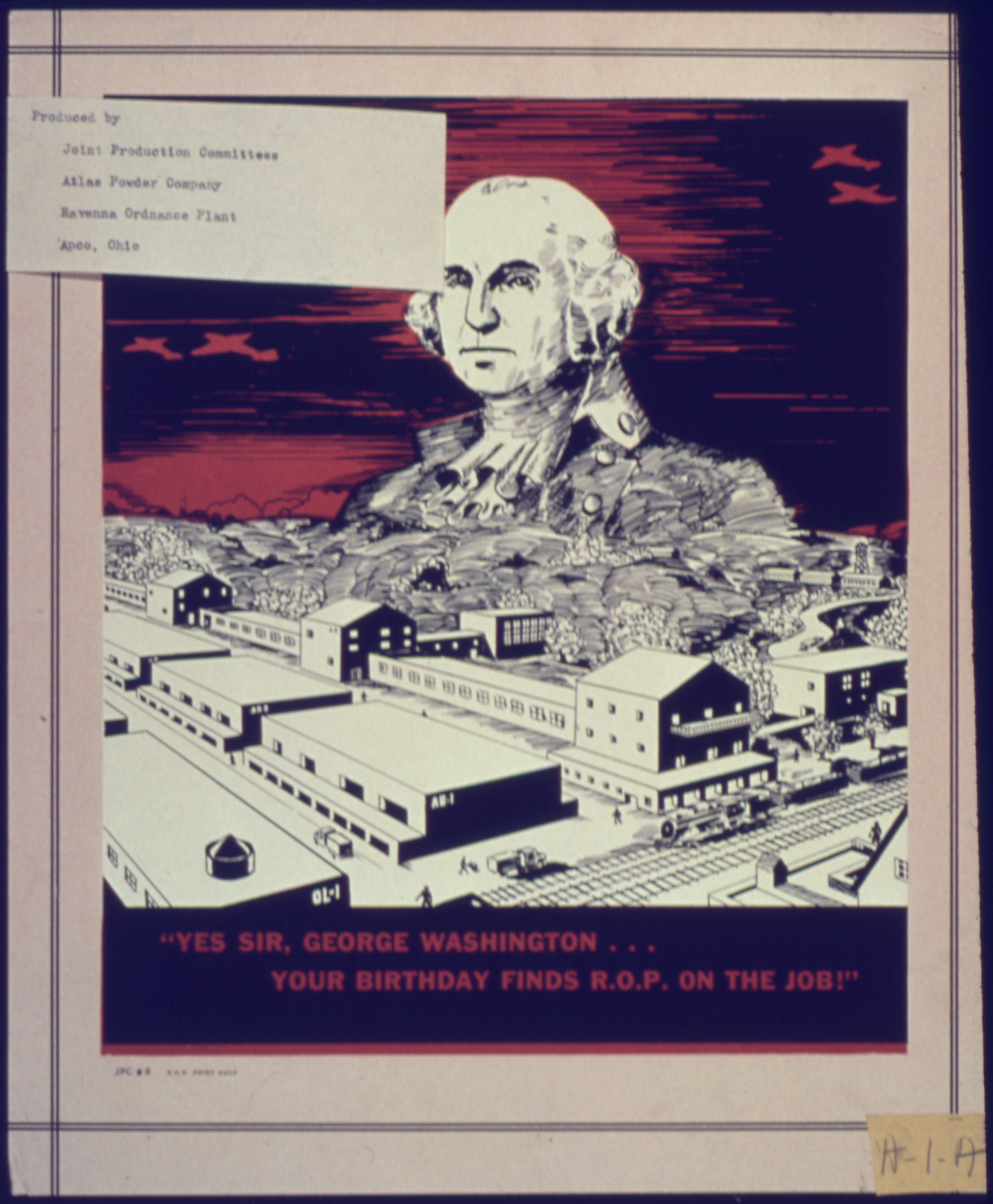
WWII poster from Atlas Powder Company, Ravenna Ordnance Plant

In 1940, the United States Department of the Army reserved 21,418 acres (87 km^{2}) for the construction of two facilities: The Ravenna Ordnance Plant, near Ravenna; and the Portage Ordnance Depot, near Windham. The facilities officially opened on March 23, 1942, although the Atlas Powder Company commenced operations there on August 18, 1941. During World War II, the two facilities were combined as the Ravenna Arsenal.

The Ravenna Arsenal had an immediate effect upon the communities of Portage County. Over 14,000 people were employed at the Arsenal during World War II, and the village of Windham was chosen as the site to house many of these workers. Windham experienced a population boom as a result; its growth of over 1200% was the largest of any U.S. municipality in the 1950 Census, as was reported in the June 1951 edition of National Geographic Magazine.

At the end of World War II, the facility was placed on "standby" status. In November 1945, control of the facility was transferred from Atlas Powder to the U.S. Army. The facility continued to be in operation on a limited basis.

During the Korean War, the Ravenna Arsenal resumed full operations. In 1951, Firestone won several defense contracts, among which was operation of the facility under a subsidiary, Ravenna Arsenal, Inc. The facility once again was placed on standby in 1957. The National Advisory Committee for Aeronautics, the forerunner to NASA, then commenced aeronautical experiments at the facility. Among these experiments was aircraft crash testing, which led to the development of an inerting system to prevent jet fuel fires.

The Ravenna Arsenal was used for the last time for the production of ammunition during the Vietnam War. In 1971, the facility was again placed on standby. Ammunition at the facility was then demilitarized, a process which continued until 1984. It also was part of ammunition refurbishment and minor research and development projects until 1992.

After years of inactivity, the facility became a Superfund site and plans to burn some of the buildings at the site were being discussed. However, an Environmental Protection Agency (EPA) work group recommended that the Army not burn the buildings due to the high levels of polychlorinated biphenyls (PCBs) in the paint. Cleanup of the site is expected to continue through 2018.

Meanwhile, transfer of the facility was ultimately made to the Ohio National Guard, although there were several intermediate caretakers. In 1983, Firestone sold its contract to Physics International Company. Ten years later, Mason & Hangar-Silas Mason Company, Inc. assumed caretaker status.

The Ravenna Training and Logistics Site of the Ohio National Guard began as a tenant unit of the Army facility, which at that time was officially designated the Ravenna Army Ammunition Plant (RVAAP). 16,164 acres (65 km^{2}) of the facility were included in the RTLS tenancy by May 16, 1999. On January 16, 2002, transfer of this land was made to the RTLS, and the RVAAP became a tenant site of the RTLS – essentially switching the roles of the two facilities. The site is now known as Camp James A. Garfield and currently occupies approximately 93% of the land originally covered by the RVAAP.

On September 11, 2007, the facility was opened to invited guests and members of the news media for a tour. At this tour, it was revealed that the RTLS would eventually encompass the 21,500 acres (87 km^{2}) formerly known as the Ravenna Arsenal. At that time, only 1,000 acres (4.0 km^{2}) remained under RVAAP control.

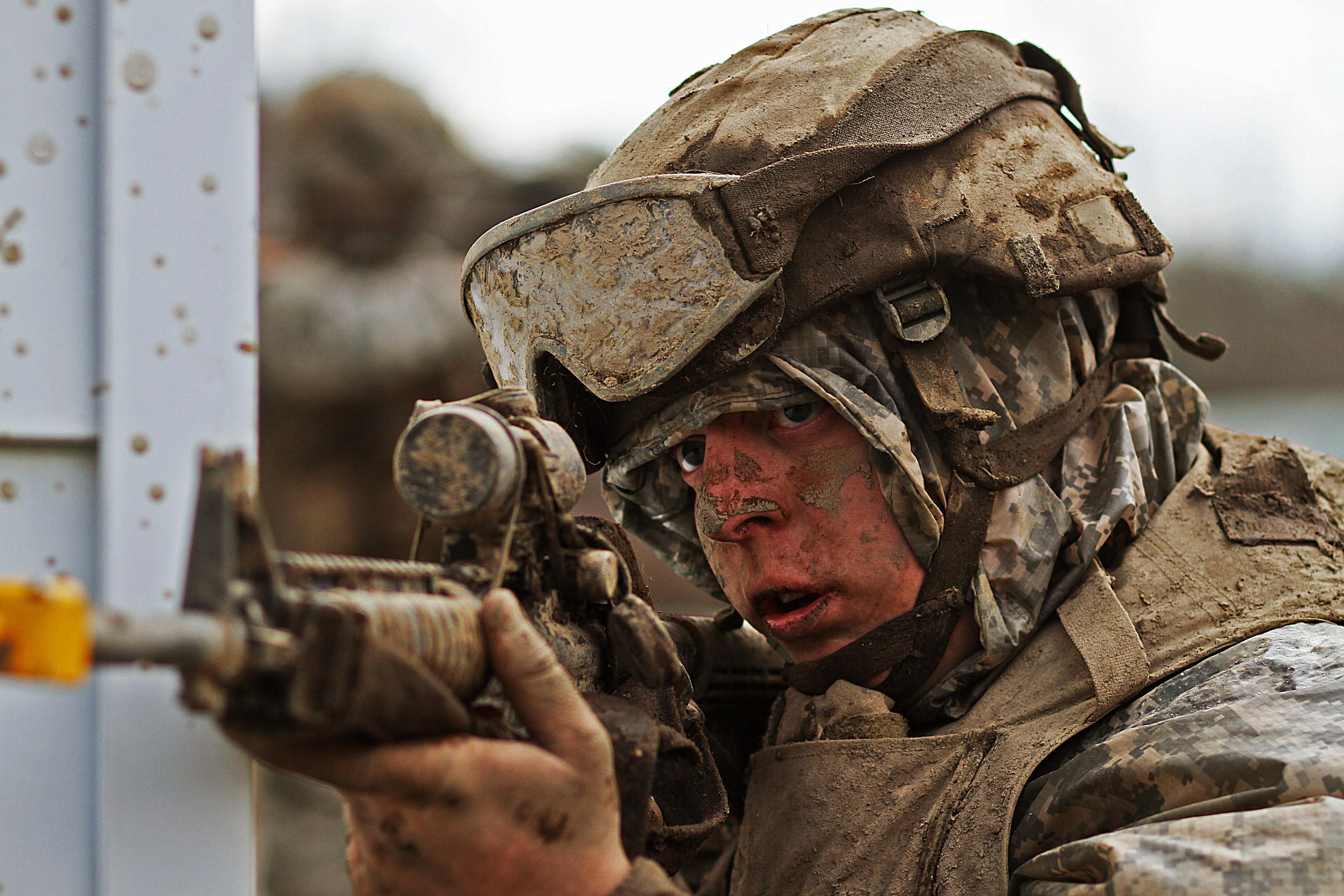
A soldier training for urban operations at the camp in 2011.

Between 2013 and 2019, Camp Garfield was one of five sites considered as the location of a proposed Eastern United States missile defense site. It was renamed for James A. Garfield, the 20th President of the United States, on October 18, 2018. Garfield lived in Portage County for many years prior to his election as president, and as a state senator in the 1860s, helped appropriate funds to create the Ohio volunteer forces, the precursor to the Ohio National Guard.

== In popular culture ==
The essayist Scott Russell Sanders spent part of his childhood living on the grounds of the Ravenna Arsenal. The Arsenal figures prominently in his memoirs The Paradise of Bombs (1987) and A Private History of Awe (2006).

The Hole in the Horn Buck is officially listed as the second largest non-typical white-tailed deer of all time by the Boone and Crockett Club. The buck's antlers score 328 2/8 non-typical points. The name of the buck derives from the mysterious hole in his right antler. It was later claimed by eyewitness George Winters to have been inflicted by a piece of chain-link fence which pierced the antler shortly before the buck died. The world record white-tailed deer was stuck under the fence to the Ravenna Arsenal in 1940.

The site can be seen in Marvel's 2014 film Captain America: The Winter Soldier.

The Ravenna Arsenal is mentioned in author John Birmingham's novel "World War 3.1," part of his Axis of Time series of science fiction novels.

== See also ==
- Badger Army Ammunition Plant
- Hole in the Horn Buck
