= Saint Joseph, Portage County, Ohio =

St. Joseph, Ohio
- Unincorporated area
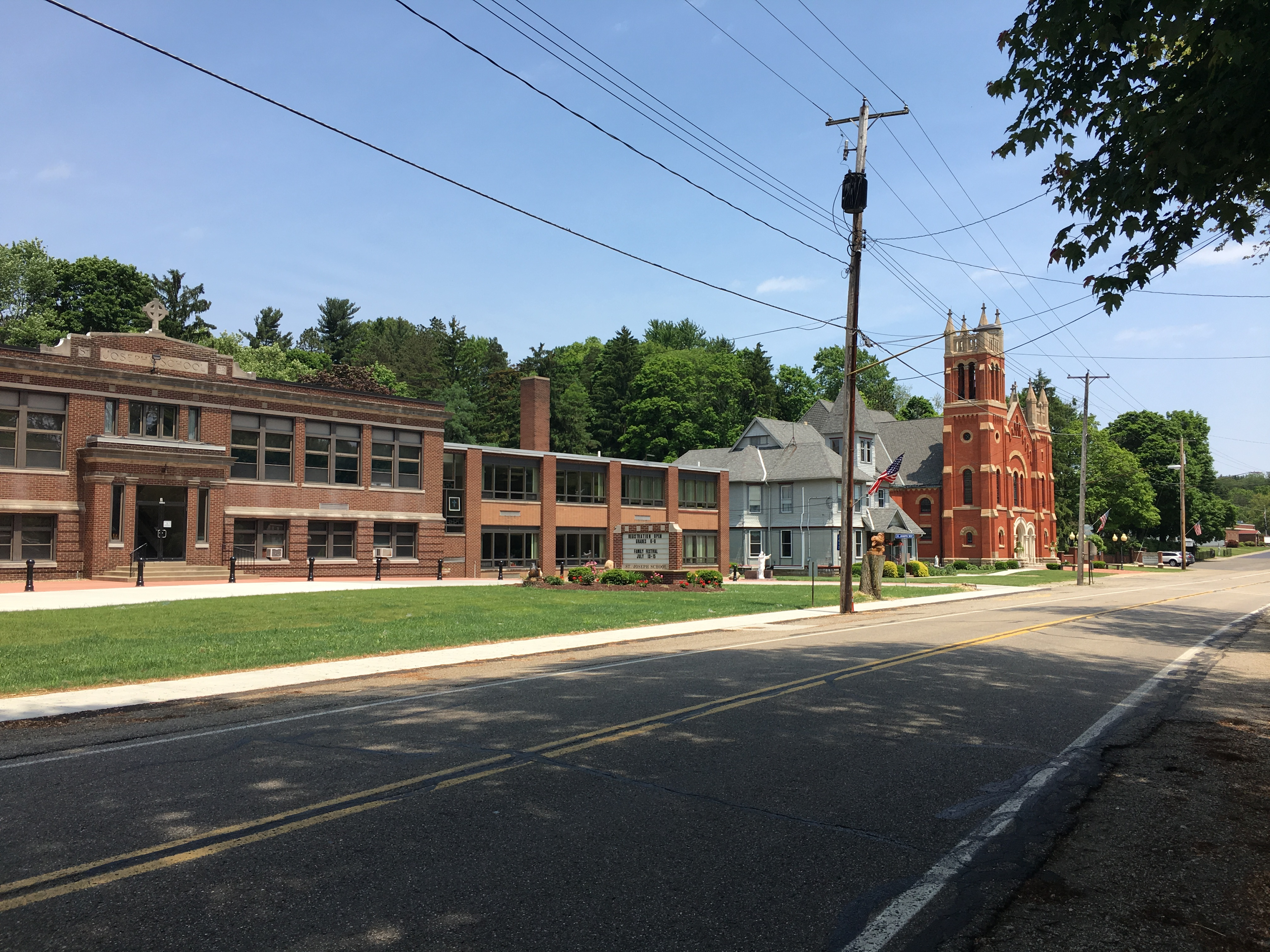
- St. Joseph School, rectory, and church in 2018

- Location in Ohio and the United States St. Joseph, Ohio (the United States)
- Coordinates: 41°01′38″N 81°17′57″W
- Country: United States
- State: Ohio
- County: Portage
- Township: Randolph
- Named for: St. Joseph Parish
- Elevation: 1,161 ft (354 m)
- Time zone: UTC−5 (EST)
  - Summer (DST): UTC−4 (EDT)
- ZIP codes: 44260, 44201
- Area codes: 330, 234
- GNIS feature ID: 1049145

Saint Joseph is an unincorporated place in Portage County, Ohio, United States. It is located along Waterloo Road on the western edge of Randolph Township near its border with Suffield. The area is named after the Roman Catholic Parish of St. Joseph, established in 1831. In addition to the church building, which dates to 1904, the parish also includes a clergy house, elementary school for grades preschool through eighth, daycare center, cemetery, grotto, and food bank. A post office was located in the community from 1893 to 1904.
