= Charlestown Township, Ohio =

Township in Ohio, US

Charlestown Township
- Civil township
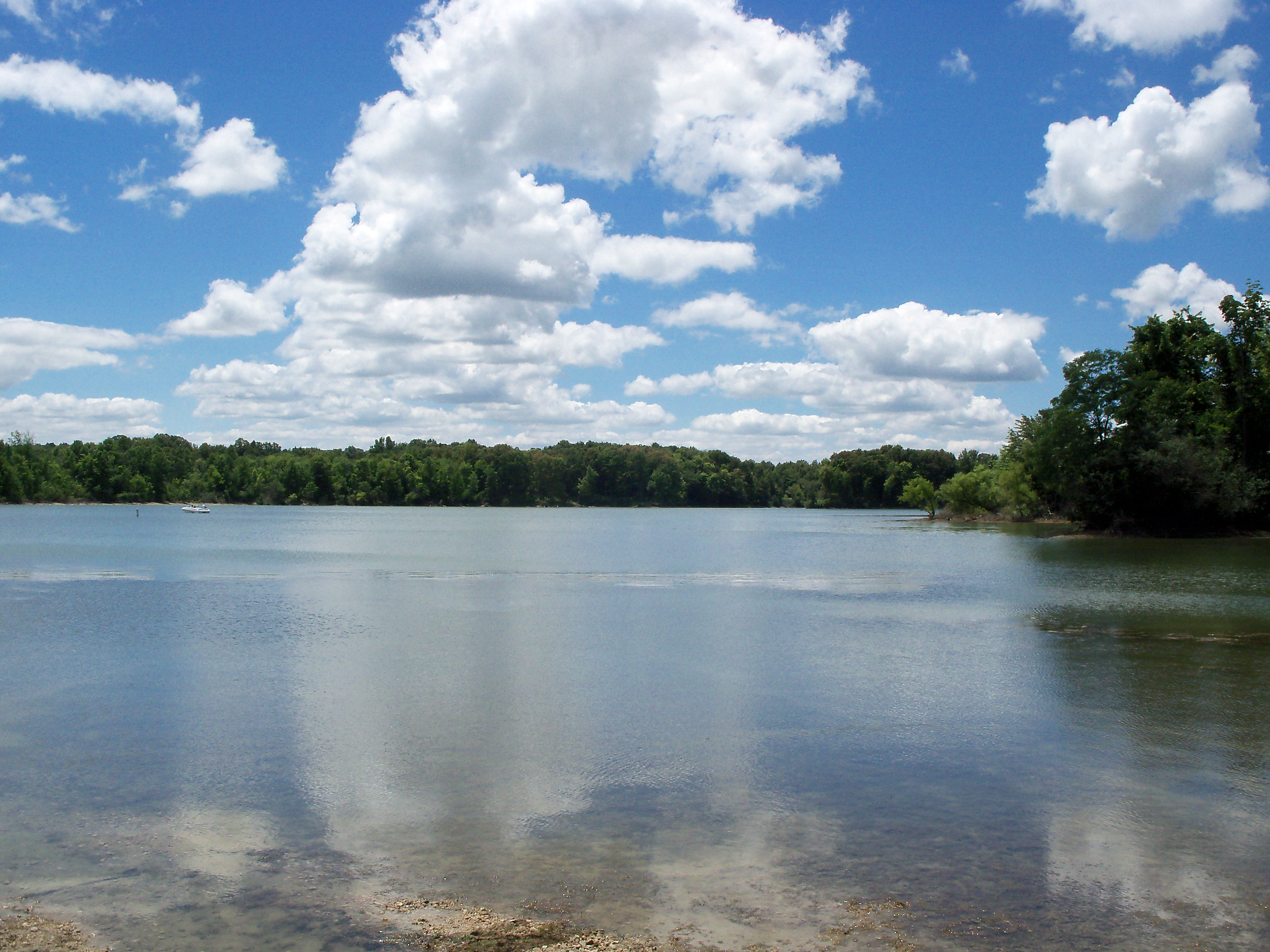
- The Michael J Kirwan Reservoir in West Branch State Park
- Interactive map of Charlestown Township
- Coordinates: 41°9′26″N 81°9′28″W
- Country: United States
- State: Ohio
- County: Portage

Area
  - Total: 23.1 sq mi (59.9 km^{2})
  - Land: 20.3 sq mi (52.7 km^{2})
  - Water: 2.8 sq mi (7.3 km^{2})
- Elevation: 1,099 ft (335 m)

Population (2020)
  - Total: 1,735
  - Density: 75.9/sq mi (29.3/km^{2})
- Time zone: UTC-5 (Eastern (EST))
  - Summer (DST): UTC-4 (EDT)
- ZIP code: 44266
- Area codes: 330, 234
- FIPS code: 39-13610
- GNIS feature ID: 1086824
- Website: https://charlestowntownship.com/

Charlestown Township is one of the eighteen townships of Portage County, Ohio, United States. The 2020 census found 1,735 people in the township.

== Geography ==
Located in the center of the county, it borders the following townships:

- Freedom Township - north
- Windham Township - northeast corner
- Paris Township - east
- Palmyra Township - southeast corner
- Edinburg Township - south
- Rootstown Township - southwest corner
- Ravenna Township - west
- Shalersville Township - northwest corner

No municipalities are located in Charlestown Township.

Formed from the Connecticut Western Reserve, Charlestown Township covers an area of 23.1 sq mi (60 km^{2}). Much of the township, however, is occupied by state and federal installations. Camp James A. Garfield, an Ohio National Guard training base created in 1941 as the Ravenna Army Ammunition Plant, covers most of the northern half of the township, while West Branch State Park and the Michael J. Kirwan reservoir, opened in 1966, occupies much of the southern half.

== Name and history ==
Charlestown Township was organized in 1814 and is the only Charlestown Township statewide. A post office called Charlestown was established in 1820, and remained in operation until 1904.

== Government ==
The township is governed by a three-member board of trustees, who are elected in November of odd-numbered years to a four-year term beginning on the following January 1. Two are elected in the year after the presidential election and one is elected in the year before it. There is also an elected township fiscal officer, who serves a four-year term beginning on April 1 of the year after the election, which is held in November of the year before the presidential election. Vacancies in the fiscal officership or on the board of trustees are filled by the remaining trustees.
