= Randolph Township, Ohio =

Township in Ohio, US

Randolph Township
- Civil township
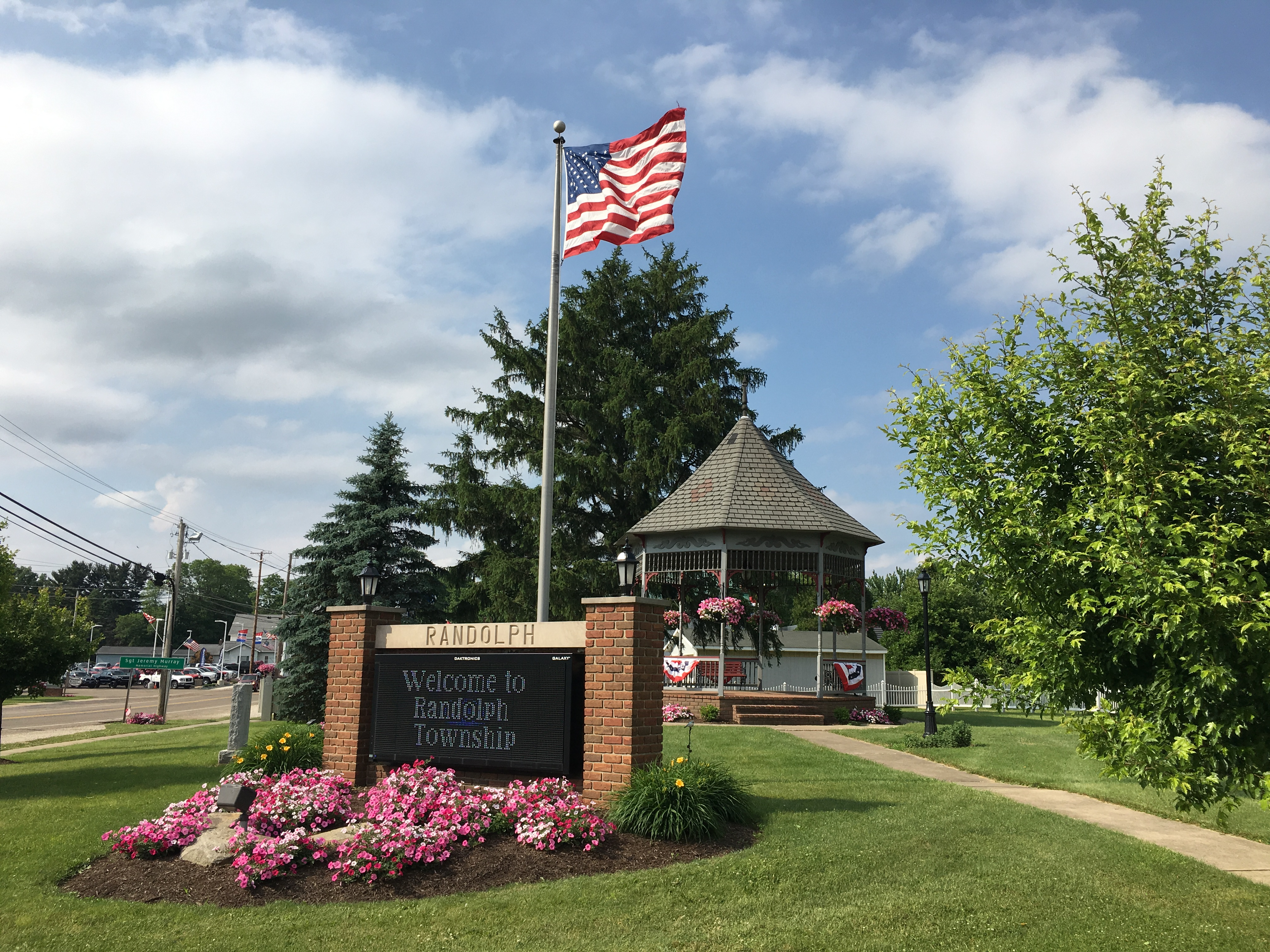
- Town center along SR 44 in 2018
- Interactive map of Randolph Township
- Location within Ohio Location within the United States
- Coordinates: 41°1′47″N 81°15′13″W
- Country: United States
- State: Ohio
- County: Portage

Area
  - Total: 29.2 sq mi (75.6 km^{2})
  - Land: 29.2 sq mi (75.5 km^{2})
  - Water: 0.039 sq mi (0.1 km^{2})
- Elevation: 1,125 ft (343 m)

Population (2020)
  - Total: 5,276
  - Density: 180/sq mi (69.6/km^{2})
- Time zone: UTC-5 (Eastern (EST))
  - Summer (DST): UTC-4 (EDT)
- ZIP code: 44265
- Area codes: 330, 234
- FIPS code: 39-65452
- GNIS feature ID: 1086836
- Website: randolphtownshipohio.com

Randolph Township is one of the eighteen townships of Portage County, Ohio, United States. The 2020 census found 5,276 people in the township.

== Geography ==
Located in the southern part of the county, it borders the following townships:

- Rootstown Township - north
- Edinburg Township - northeast corner
- Atwater Township - east
- Marlboro Township, Stark County - south
- Lake Township, Stark County - southwest
- Suffield Township - west
- Brimfield Township - northwest corner

No municipalities are located in Randolph Township, though the unincorporated community of Saint Joseph is located in the far western edge of the township.

Formed from the Connecticut Western Reserve, Randolph Township covers an area of 25 sq mi.

== Name and history ==
Randolph Township was named in honor of Randolph Storrs, the son of a pioneer settler.

It is the only Randolph Township statewide.

== Government ==
The township is governed by a three-member board of trustees, who are elected in November of odd-numbered years to a four-year term beginning on the following January 1. Two are elected in the year after the presidential election and one is elected in the year before it. There is also an elected township fiscal officer, who serves a four-year term beginning on April 1 of the year after the election, which is held in November of the year before the presidential election. Vacancies in the fiscal officership or on the board of trustees are filled by the remaining trustees.

Randolph has a public library, a branch of the Portage County District Library.

== Public services ==
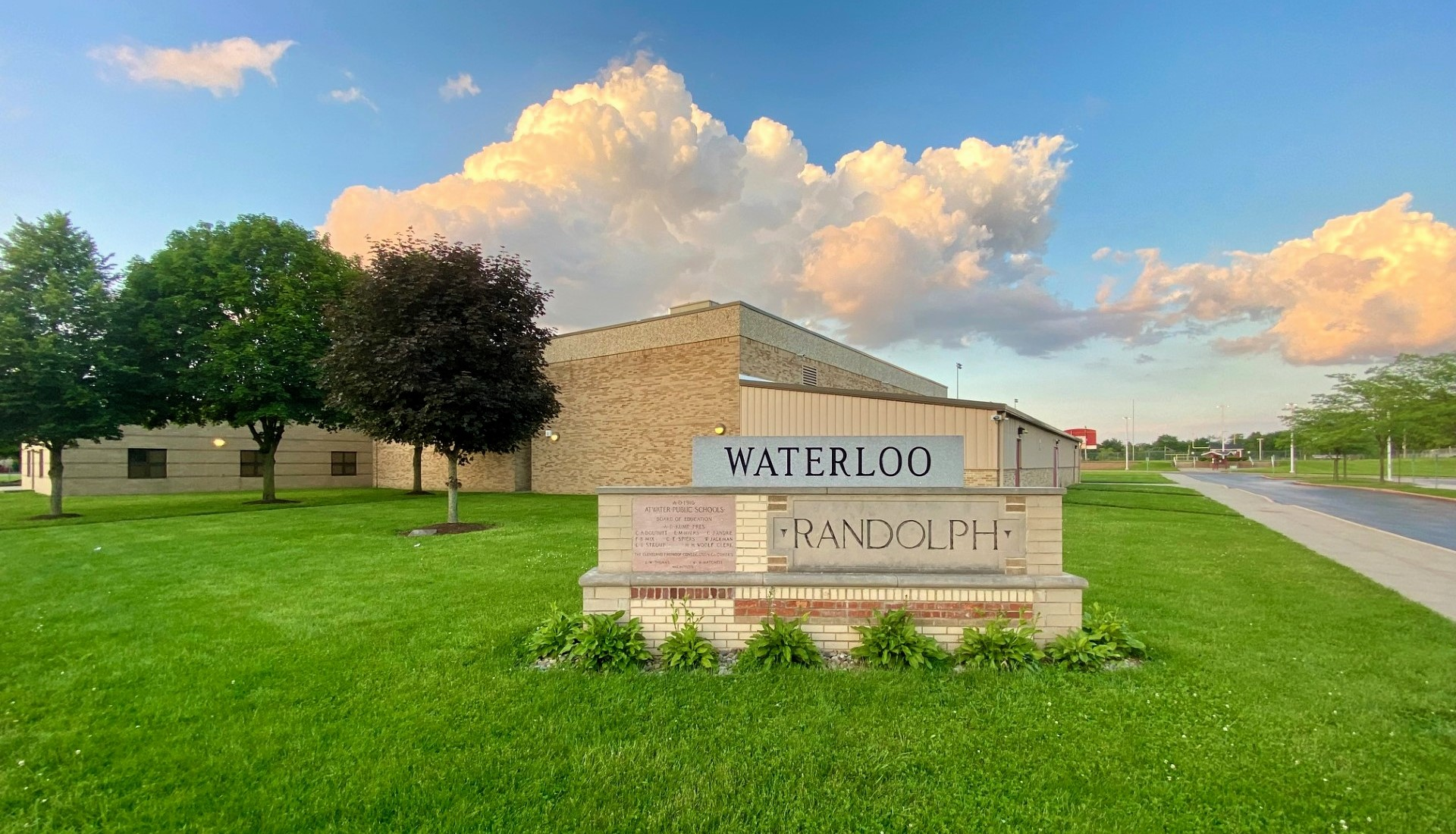
Waterloo Local School District

Students in Randolph Township have been served by the Waterloo Local School District since 1969, which also serves neighboring Atwater Township, which the school is also located within.
