= Lloyd, Ohio =

- Unincorporated community
- Location within Ohio Location within the United States
- Coordinates: 41°04′21″N 81°01′20″W
- Country: United States
- State: Ohio
- County: Portage
- Elevation: 1,024 ft (312 m)
- Time zone: UTC-5 (Eastern (EST))
  - Summer (DST): UTC-4 (EDT)
- Area code: 330
- GNIS feature ID: 1071103

Lloyd, also called Grover, Mott Town, Mottown, and Mottstown, is a former settlement in Portage County, Ohio, United States. It was located in along present-day Williams Road in southeastern Palmyra Township.

A post office called Lloyd was established in 1887, and remained in operation until 1920.
