= Kent Free Library =

Public library in Kent, Ohio, United States

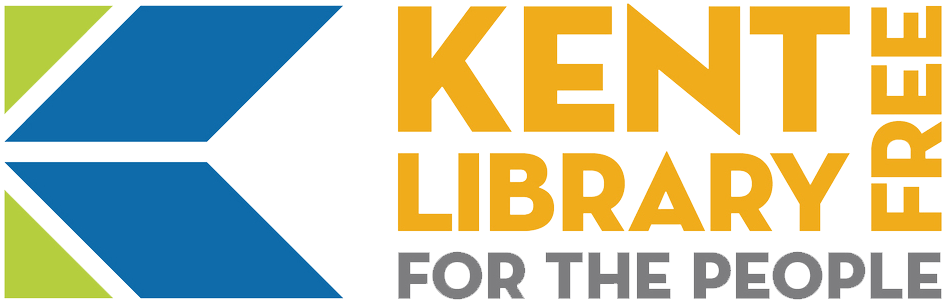

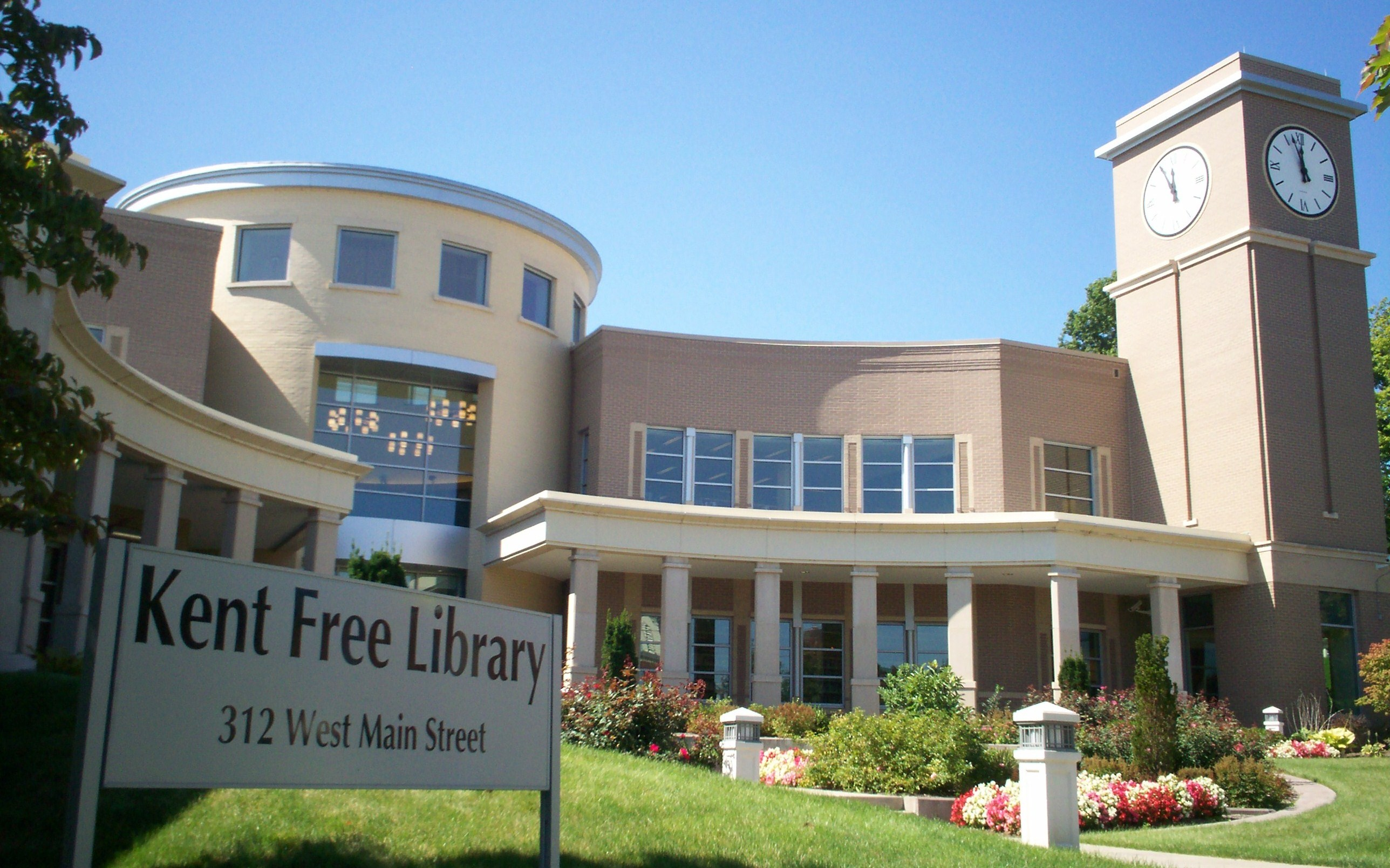
- Front side facing West Main Street, 2009
- 41.1534°N 81.3613°W
- Location: 312 West Main Street; Kent, Ohio 44240; United States
- Established: 1892

Collection
- Size: 166,407 (2021)

Access and use
- Circulation: 533,077 (2021)
- Population served: 34,257 (2021)
- Members: 35,782 (2019)

Other information
- Budget: $2.5 million (2019)
- Director: Stacey Richardson
- Employees: 25 (2019)
- Website: kentfreelibrary.org

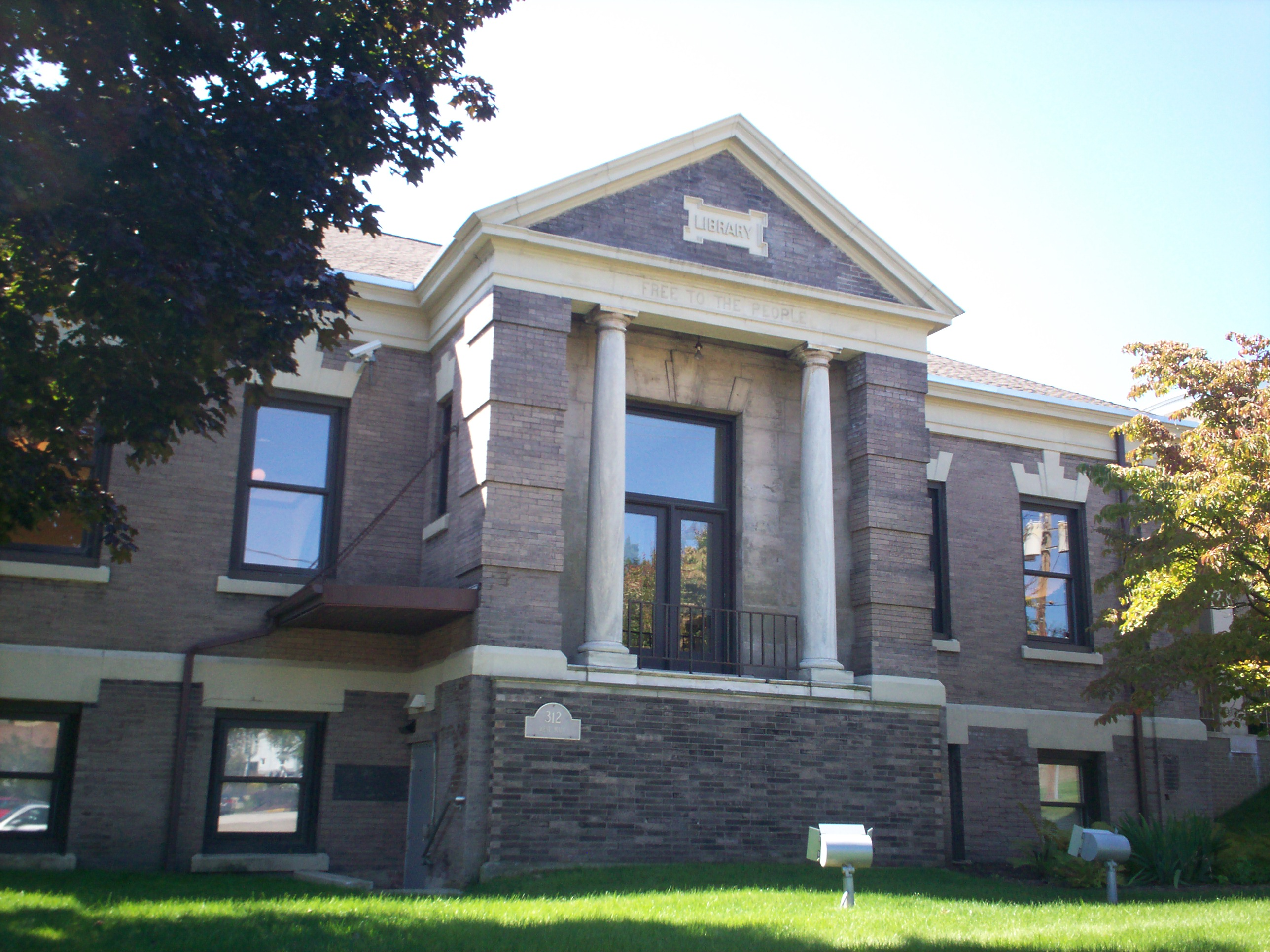
Original Carnegie portion of the library, which opened in 1903.

The Kent Free Library is a public library located in Kent, Ohio, United States. The oldest part of its current building is a Carnegie library that opened in 1903. The library is part of the Portage Library Consortium, which includes the Portage County Library District and Reed Memorial Library in nearby Ravenna, and is a school district library associated with the Kent City School District.

Kent Free Library was established in 1892 as the first use of an 1892 Ohio law that allowed municipalities under 5,000 residents to tax residents for library support. Initially, the library was housed in a downtown Kent business block. Pittsburgh steel industrialist and philanthropist Andrew Carnegie offered the then-village of Kent $11,500 for construction of a permanent home for the library in 1901, contingent on a suitable location and voter approval of a tax levy for maintenance. Kent voters approved the measure and town namesake Marvin Kent donated the land, a lot at the southwest corner of West Main and South River Streets. The library opened at its new location on September 26, 1903.

Since 1903, the library has undergone several expansions, with the latest expansion occurring in 2004–2006. During the 2004–2006 expansion, the three previous additions to the original Carnegie library were demolished and a new three-story addition was built in their places while the original Carnegie library was renovated and restored. The addition tripled available space by adding approximately 55,000 square feet (5,100 m^{2}) to the original Carnegie building. During construction, the library was temporarily housed in Kent's University Plaza shopping center. The current building and the renovated Carnegie portion opened on September 26, 2006, exactly 103 years after the Carnegie library first opened.
