= Waterloo Local School District =

School district in Ohio, United States

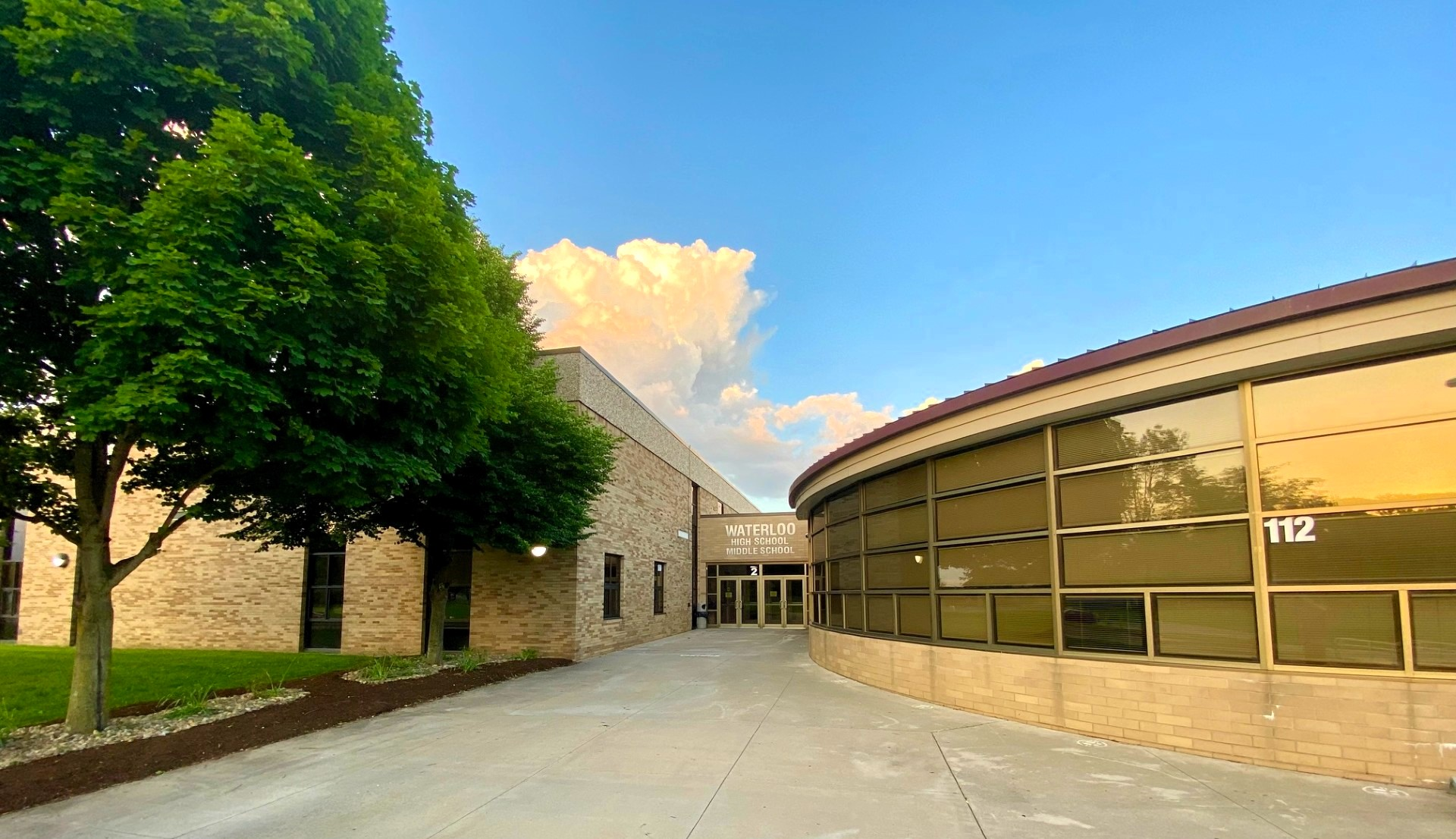

Address
- 1464 Industry Road Atwater, Ohio, 44201; United States
- Coordinates: 41°01′42.5″N 81°11′37.9″W

District information
- Type: Public
- Grades: K–12
- Established: 1965
- Accreditation: Ohio Department of Education
- NCES District ID: 3904924

Students and staff
- Enrollment: 796 (2024–25)
- Staff: 51.00 (FTE)
- Student–teacher ratio: 15.61
- District mascot: Vikings
- Colors: Burgundy and white

Other information
- Website: www.viking.portage.k12.oh.us/home

The Waterloo Local School District is a public school district based in Atwater, Ohio, United States, that serves Atwater and Randolph townships, along with a small part of northwestern Deerfield Township. The school district consists of one high school and one elementary school, housed together in a single K–12 building.

== History ==
By the early 1960s, many rural school districts in Ohio had consolidated with each other or merged with a neighboring city or village school district, mainly due to changes in state funding and standards. The Waterloo Local School District was formed in September 1965, as a result of the consolidation of the Atwater and Randolph school districts, which was necessitated by both Atwater and Randolph high schools being threatened with loss of accreditation by the state of Ohio due to inadequate programs and facilities. The name Waterloo was chosen on October 18, 1965, named after Waterloo Road, one of the main roads that connects Randolph and Atwater. The Viking mascot as well as the school colors of burgundy and white were voted on by the student bodies of both schools in October 1966 from six entries, three coming from each school.

Initially, students remained at their respective township school, though a limited number of high school students from each school were able to participate in programs at the other. The two sports teams, the Atwater Spartans and the Randolph Tigers, purposely did not play each other during the 1966–67 school year. Voters approved a bond issue in 1966 to construct a new high school on Industry Road, which follows the border between Atwater and Randolph townships. Waterloo High School officially opened September 5, 1967, with grades 10–12 meeting in the Randolph building and grades 7–9 meeting in the Atwater building for the 1967–68 school year, while grades 1–6 for each township continued meeting in their respective buildings. The new building on Industry Road opened September 9, 1968, and was finished and dedicated on January 26, 1969.

After the opening of the new high school, the Atwater and Randolph buildings were initially used as elementary schools, with grades K–6 at Randolph and grades K–8 at Atwater. Financial difficulties during the 1969–70 school year led to the district consolidating students in grades 1–4 and Atwater kindergarten at the Atwater building, named Waterloo Primary School, and students in grades 5–8, along with Randolph kindergarten, at the Randolph building, named Waterloo Middle School, beginning in the 1970–71 school year. Kindergarten classes were consolidated at the primary school in Atwater starting in the 1972-73 school year.

Voters approved a bond issue in 2000 to construct an addition to the high school to house grades K–8 and consolidate all students to a single campus. This addition opened in early 2004.

== Schools ==
=== High school ===
- Waterloo Junior/Senior High School, grades 7–12

=== Elementary school ===
- Waterloo Elementary School, grades K–6
