= Edinburg Township, Ohio =

Township in Ohio, US

Edinburg Township
- Civil township
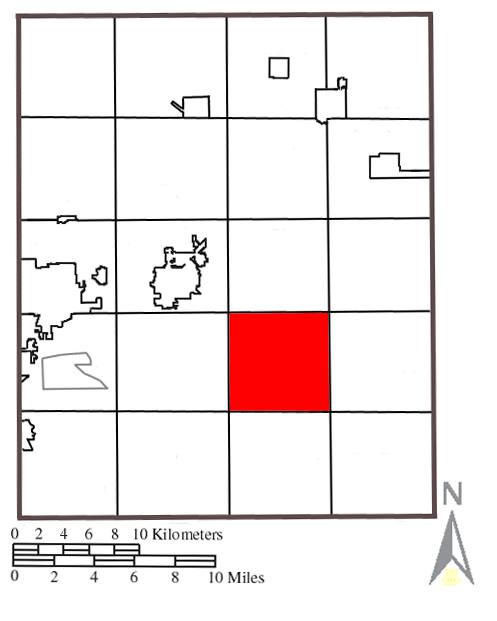
- Location within Portage County

- Location in the United States and Ohio Edinburg Township (Ohio)
- Coordinates: 41°6′22″N 81°8′58″W
- Country: United States
- State: Ohio
- County: Portage

Area
  - Total: 24.5 sq mi (63.4 km^{2})
  - Land: 24.2 sq mi (62.6 km^{2})
  - Water: 0.27 sq mi (0.7 km^{2})
- Elevation: 1,180 ft (360 m)

Population (2020)
  - Total: 2,351
  - Density: 97/sq mi (37.6/km^{2})
- Time zone: UTC-5 (Eastern (EST))
  - Summer (DST): UTC-4 (EDT)
- ZIP code: 44272 and 44266
- Area code: 330
- FIPS code: 39-24584
- GNIS feature ID: 1086826
- Website: https://www.edinburgtownship.com/

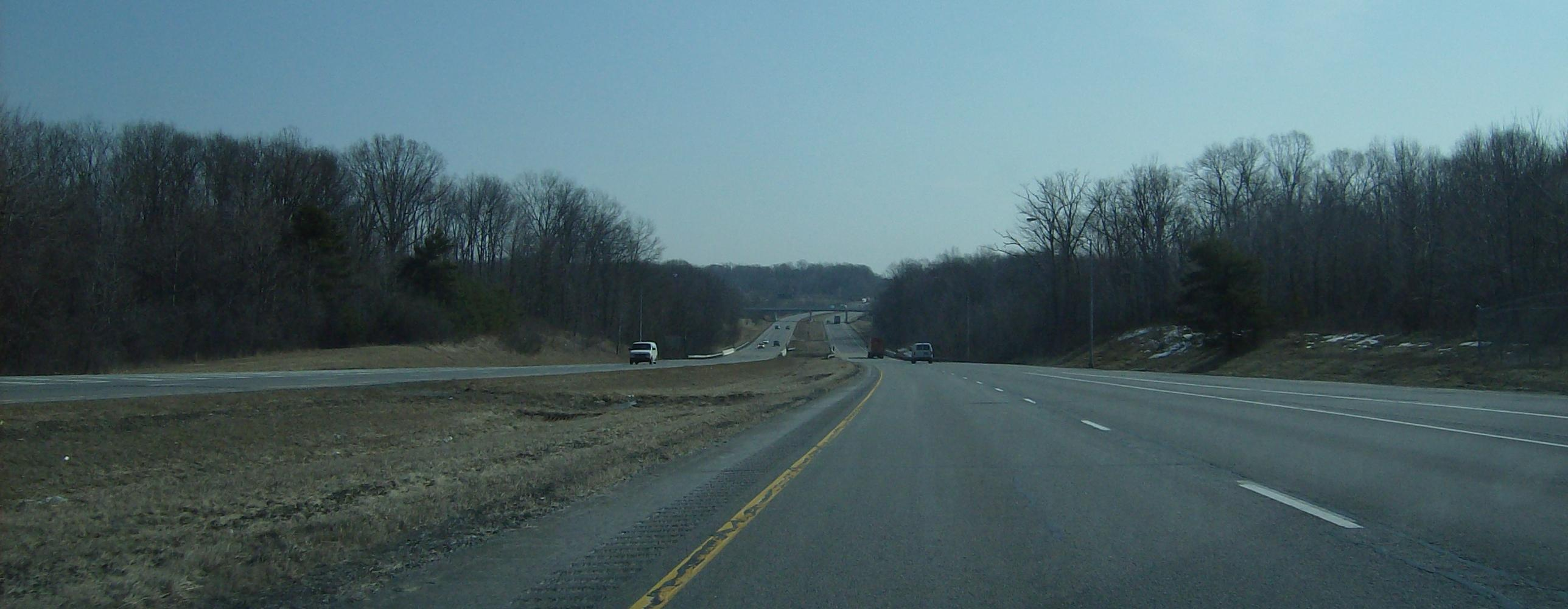
Interstate 76 travels through the woods and hills of Edinburg Township

Edinburg Township is one of the eighteen townships of Portage County, Ohio, United States. The 2020 census found 2,351 people in the township.

== Geography ==
Located in the southeastern part of the county, it borders the following townships:

- Charlestown Township - north
- Paris Township - northeast corner
- Palmyra Township - east
- Deerfield Township - southeast corner
- Atwater Township - south
- Randolph Township - southwest corner
- Rootstown Township - west
- Ravenna Township - northwest corner

No municipalities are located in Edinburg Township.

Formed from the Connecticut Western Reserve, Edinburg Township covers an area of 24 sq mi (62 km^{2}).

== Name and history ==
The first settlement at Edinburg was made in 1815 and the township was organized in 1819. It is named for Lewis Eddy, a pioneer settler, and was originally called "Eddysburg". It is the only Edinburg Township statewide. A post office was established at Edinburg in 1822, and remained in operation until 1903.

== Government ==
The township is governed by a three-member board of trustees, who are elected in November of odd-numbered years to a four-year term beginning on the following January 1. Two are elected in the year after the presidential election and one is elected in the year before it. There is also an elected township fiscal officer, who serves a four-year term beginning on April 1 of the year after the election, which is held in November of the year before the presidential election. Vacancies in the fiscal officership or on the board of trustees are filled by the remaining trustees.
