= Ravenna Township, Portage County, Ohio =

Township in Ohio, US

Ravenna Township
- Civil township
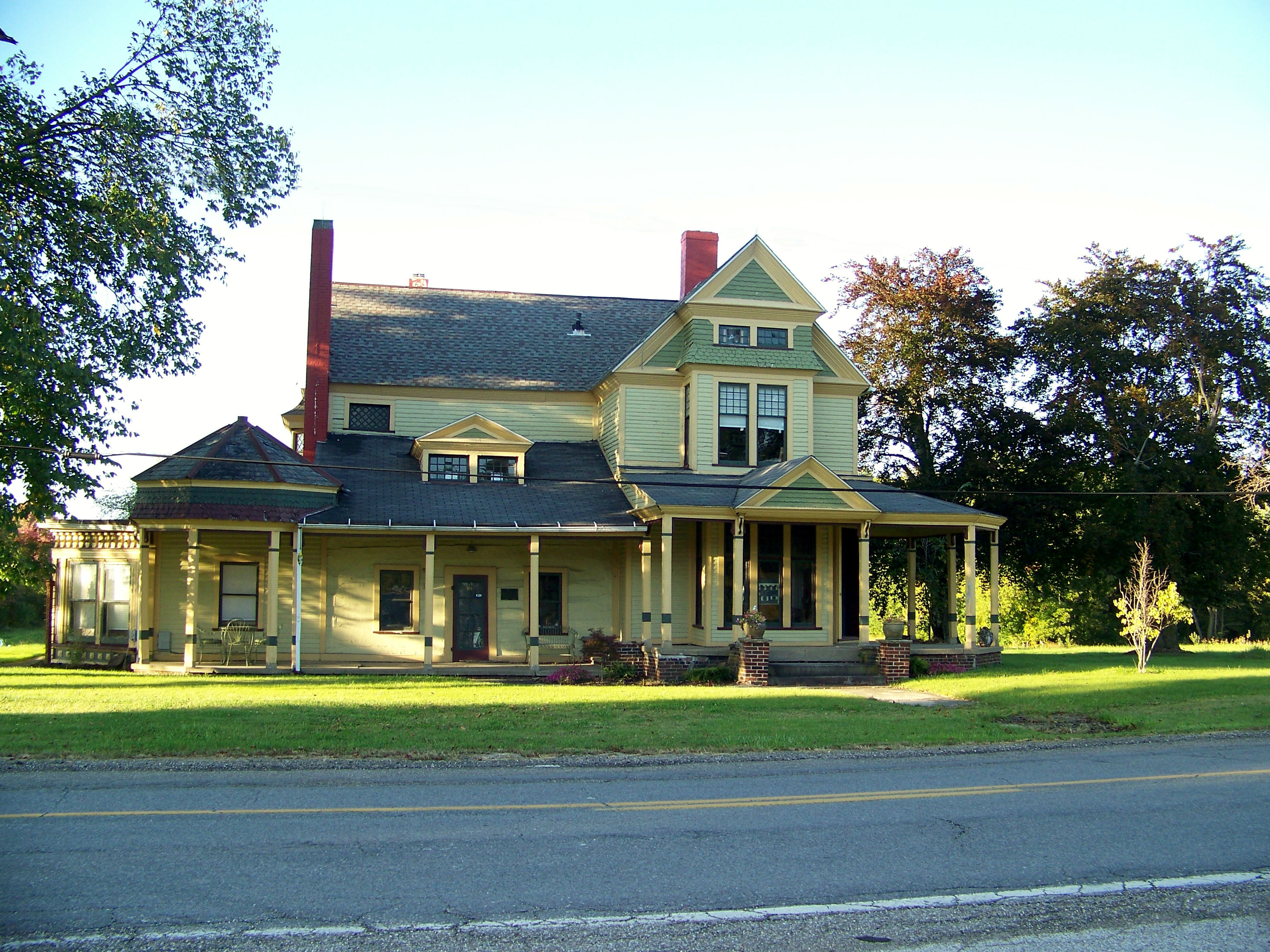
- Farmhouse at the Crystal Lake Stock Farm
- Coordinates: 41°10′7″N 81°14′43″W
- Country: United States
- State: Ohio
- County: Portage

Area
  - Total: 20.6 sq mi (53 km^{2})
  - Land: 20.4 sq mi (53 km^{2})
  - Water: 0.2 sq mi (0.52 km^{2})
- Elevation: 1,106 ft (337 m)

Population (2020)
  - Total: 8,980
  - Density: 440.2/sq mi (170.0/km^{2})
- Time zone: UTC-5 (Eastern (EST))
  - Summer (DST): UTC-4 (EDT)
- ZIP code: 44266
- Area codes: 330, 234
- FIPS code: 39-65606
- GNIS feature ID: 1086837

Ravenna Township is one of the eighteen civil townships of Portage County, Ohio, United States. The 2020 census found 8,980 people in the township.

== Geography ==
Located in the center of the county, it borders the following townships and city:

- Shalersville Township - north
- Freedom Township - northeast corner
- Charlestown Township - east
- Edinburg Township - southeast corner
- Rootstown Township - south
- Brimfield Township - southwest corner
- Franklin Township - west
- Streetsboro - northwest corner

The city of Ravenna, the county seat of Portage County, which became independent of the township in 1993, is surrounded by Ravenna Township.

Formed from Town 3, Range 8 of the Connecticut Western Reserve, Ravenna Township covers an area of 20 sq mi (52 km^{2}).

== Name and history ==
It is the only Ravenna Township statewide. In the western part of the township along Ohio State Route 59 is the unincorporated town of Black Horse (or Blackhorse), named after the Blackhorse Tavern that was located there in the 19th century.

== Government ==
The township is governed by a three-member board of trustees, who are elected in November of odd-numbered years to a four-year term beginning on the following January 1. Two are elected in the year after the presidential election and one is elected in the year before it. There is also an elected township fiscal officer, who serves a four-year term beginning on April 1 of the year after the election, which is held in November of the year before the presidential election. Vacancies in the fiscal officership or on the board of trustees are filled by the remaining trustees.

== Notable people ==
- Randi Clites, representative from the 75th district of the Ohio House of Representatives from 2019-2020
