= Windham Township, Ohio =

Township in Ohio, US

Windham Township
- Township
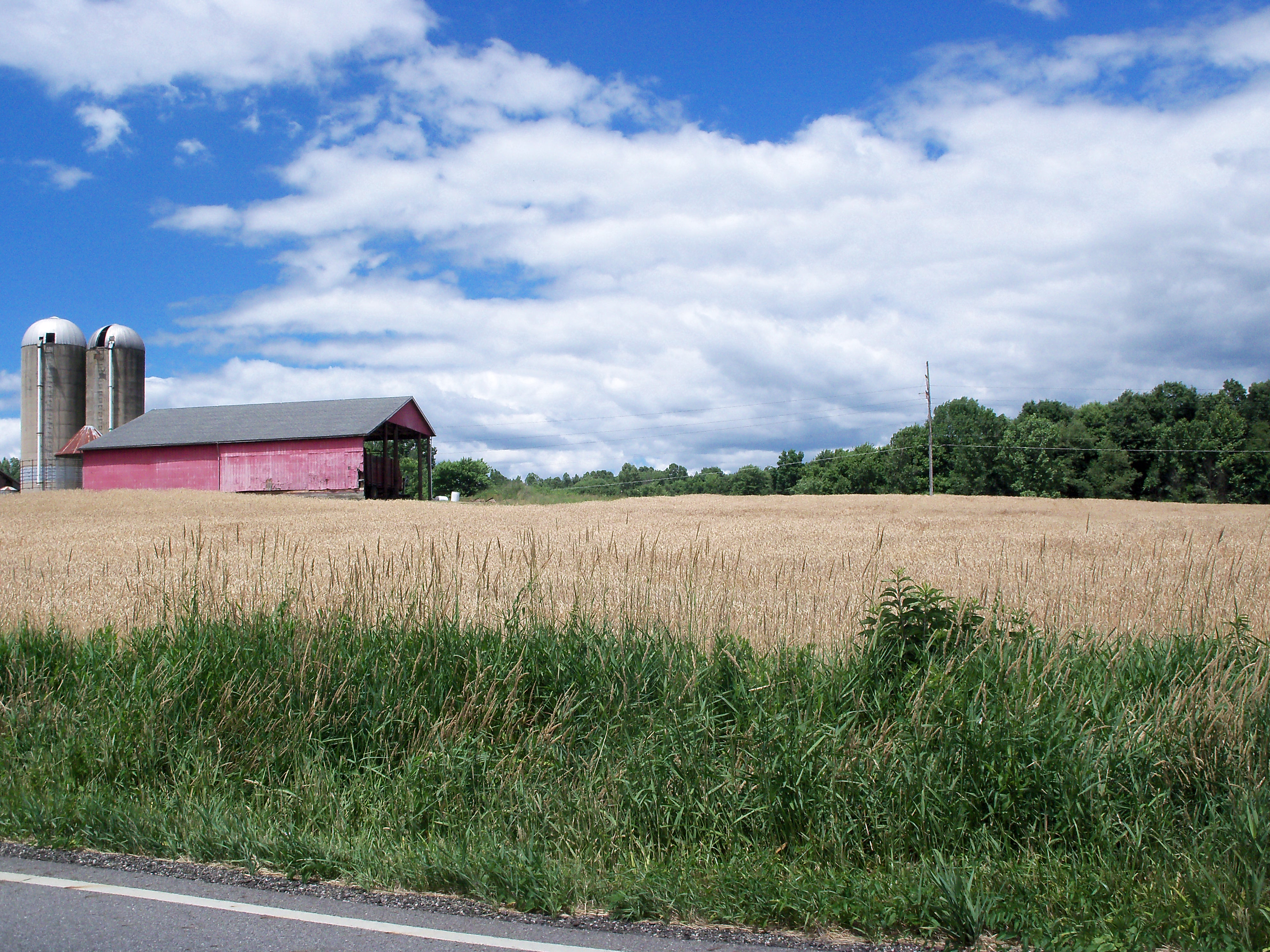
- A wheat field, barn and silos along Route 82
- Interactive map of Windham Township
- Coordinates: 41°15′14″N 81°2′47″W
- Country: United States
- State: Ohio
- County: Portage

Area
  - Total: 22.9 sq mi (59.4 km^{2})
  - Land: 22.9 sq mi (59.4 km^{2})
  - Water: 0 sq mi (0.0 km^{2})
- Elevation: 968 ft (295 m)

Population (2020)
  - Total: 1,784
  - Density: 77.8/sq mi (30.0/km^{2})
- Time zone: UTC-5 (Eastern (EST))
  - Summer (DST): UTC-4 (EDT)
- ZIP code: 44288
- Area codes: 330, 234
- FIPS code: 39-85960
- GNIS feature ID: 1086843
- Website: https://windhamtownship.com/

Windham Township is one of the eighteen townships of Portage County, Ohio, United States. The 2020 census found 1,784 people in the township.

== Name and history ==
Named for the town of Windham, Connecticut, it is the only Windham Township statewide.

Prior to 1811, the land now comprising the Village and Township of Windham was owned by Caleb Strong, as part of his holdings through the Connecticut Western Reserve, On September 11, 1810, a group of sixteen men met in Becket, Massachusetts at the home of Thatcher Conant to discuss the purchase of land in Ohio for settlement. These men, who would be known as the Beckett [sic] Land Company, consisted of Conant, Elijah Alford, Nathan Birchard, Gideon Bush, Dillingham Clark, Elisha Clark, Isaac Clark, Benjamin Higley, Aaron P. Jagger, Enos Kingsley, Jeremiah Lyman, Bill Messenger, Ebenezer Messenger, Benjamin C. Perkins, John Seely, and Alpheus Streator.

On November 11, 1810, the Beckett Land Company purchased about 14,825 acres (60 km^{2}) from Caleb Strong. The land was divided into 100 lots, and allotted according to each family's investment in the company. Conant, his wife Elizabeth, Dillingham and Abigail Clark, and Alpheus and Anna Streator donated portions of their allotments near the center of the township for a village green, which was common practice for townships in the Connecticut Western Reserve. The group of sixteen families then departed from Massachusetts on May 2, 1811. Six weeks later, they arrived in the purchased survey township, which was located immediately south of Nelson Township in the Connecticut Western Reserve. This new township, known today as Windham Township, was survey town 4 in range 6 of the Western Reserve.

The first religious service in the new township was held on July 28, 1811 in the home of one of the settlers. This service was very likely Congregationalist, as several of the families belonged to the Congregational Church in Becket, Massachusetts. The Congregational Church eventually constructed a building on the Green, and today that church still remains on the Green as a member church of the United Church of Christ.

The Windham Historical Society notes that the township was originally named Strongsburg, however, some sources cite the original name as Strongsburgh. The namesake was original landowner Caleb Strong, who was by then the Governor of Massachusetts. There is some discrepancy in how this township came to be known as Windham. According to the Windham Historical Society, the name of the township "was changed to Sharon, by an act of legislature in about 1820…. A few years later the name was again changed to Windham, which it has remained to present." The Historical Society also cites political concerns as the reason the name was changed from Strongsburg to Sharon. However, on Windham Township's website, March 2, 1813 is cited as the date on which "the Township was made a district by itself and the name was changed to 'Sharon'." The website goes on to state that in 1820, by an act of legislature, the name was changed again to Windham. Yet another source, The Ohio Gazetteer, and Travelers's [sic] Guide, states that the name was changed from Sharon to Windham in January, 1829. Still another source places these dates as 1817 and 1820, respectively. Common to most sources are a few claims which reasonably can be ascertained to be fact:

- Caleb Strong was the original namesake of the township.
- The name of the township was changed from Strongsburg/Strongsburgh, to Sharon, and again to Windham.
- The second name change, from Sharon to Windham, was in honor of Windham, Connecticut—home to at least some of the township's original settlers.

== Government ==
The township is governed by a three-member board of trustees, who are elected in November of odd-numbered years to a four-year term beginning on the following January 1. Two are elected in the year after the presidential election and one is elected in the year before it. There is also an elected township fiscal officer, who serves a four-year term beginning on April 1 of the year after the election, which is held in November of the year before the presidential election. Vacancies in the fiscal officership or on the board of trustees are filled by the remaining trustees.

== Geography ==
Located in the northeastern part of the county, it borders the following townships and municipalities:

The village of Windham, which became independent of the township in 1993, is almost completely surrounded by Windham Township. The village of Windham borders Braceville Township in Trumbull County at the village's easternmost boundary.

Formed from Town 4, Range 6 of the Connecticut Western Reserve, Windham Township covers an area of 23 sq mi. The township is nearly bisected from east to west by Interstate 80, also known as the Ohio Turnpike. The Ravenna Training and Logistics Site covers most of the southern half of the township. Hiram Township once adjoined Windham Township at the latter's northwesternmost point. When the village of Garrettsville annexed this portion of Hiram Township, that ceased to be true.
