= Woodworth =

== Places ==
=== Canada ===
- Rural Municipality of Woodworth, Manitoba
- Rural Municipality of Wallace – Woodworth, Manitoba

=== United States ===
- Woodworth, Illinois, an unincorporated town in Ash Grove Township, Iroquois County, Illinois
- Woodworth, Louisiana
- Woodworth, North Dakota
- Woodworth, Ohio

== People ==
- Charles E. Woodworth (1897–1966), Entomologist, Major in U.S. Army
- Charles W. Woodworth (1865–1940), Entomologist, suggested use of Drosophila for genetic research
- Dempster Woodworth (1844–1922), Wisconsin state senator
- Francis Channing Woodworth (1812–1859), writer of children's books.
- James Hutchinson Woodworth (1804–1869), Mayor of Chicago, U.S. Congressman
- Jay Backus Woodworth (1865–1925), American geologist
- John Woodworth (New York politician) (1768–1858), New York Attorney General 1804–1808
- John Maynard Woodworth (1837–1879), first surgeon-general of the United States
- Laurin D. Woodworth (1838–1897), U.S. Congressman
- Maria Woodworth-Etter (1844–1924), evangelist
- Mary Parker Woodworth (1849–1919), American writer and speaker
- Megan Woodworth (born 2003), Canadian ice hockey player
- Pete Woodworth (born 1988), American baseball coach
- Robert Woodworth (politician) (1743–after 1806), New York state senator
- Robert S. Woodworth (1869–1962), American psychologist
- Samuel Woodworth (1784–1842), poet, author of the Old Oaken Bucket
- Selim E. Woodworth (1815–1871), U.S. Naval officer
- Walter Woodworth (1612–1686), early immigrant to the Plymouth Colony and progenitor of most American Woodworths
- William Woodworth (inventor) (1780–1839), inventor
- William W. Woodworth (1807–1873), U.S. Congressman

== Other ==
- Woodworth House, home of Joseph Woodworth in Los Angeles
- Woodworth House, the childhood home of Samuel Woodworth in Massachusetts
- C. W. Woodworth Award, an award for achievement in Entomology over the last ten years
- USS Woodworth (DD-460), a World War II era United States Navy destroyer

== See also ==
- Woodworth political family
