= Senator Woodworth =

Senator Woodworth may refer to:

- Arthur W. Woodworth (1823–1919), Vermont State Senate
- Dempster Woodworth (1844–1922), California State Senate
- Frederick A. Woodworth (died 1865), California State Senate
- Frederick L. Woodworth (1877–1944), Michigan State Senate
- James Hutchinson Woodworth (1804–1869), Illinois State Senate
- John Woodworth (New York politician) (1768–1858), New York State Senate
- Laurin D. Woodworth (1837–1897), Ohio State Senate
