= Frederick Woodworth =

Frederick Woodworth may refer to:

- Frederick A. Woodworth (died 1865), San Francisco businessman, attorney, and member of the Woodworth political family
- Frederick L. Woodworth (1877–1944), thorough-bred horse breeder, scientific farmer, and member of the Woodworth political family
