= James MacKay (New Hampshire politician) =

American politician

Mayor of Concord, New Hampshire
- In office 1986–1988
- Succeeded by: Liz Hager
- In office 1990–1991
- Preceded by: Liz Hager
- Succeeded by: William J. Veroneau

Member of the New Hampshire House of Representatives from the Merrimack 17th district
- In office 1994–1996

Member of the New Hampshire House of Representatives from the Merrimack 24th district
- In office 2000–2002

Member of the New Hampshire House of Representatives from the Merrimack 39th district
- In office 2002–2004

Member of the New Hampshire House of Representatives from the Merrimack 11th district
- In office 2004–2008
- In office 2010–2012

Member of the New Hampshire House of Representatives from the Merrimack 14th district
- In office 2012 – December 7, 2022

Member of the New Hampshire House of Representatives from the Merrimack 18th district
- Incumbent
- Assumed office December 7, 2022
- Succeeded by: Lisa Beaudoin (elect)

Personal details
- Born: May 8, 1930 (age 96)
- Party: Democratic

James MacKay (born May 8, 1930), also known as Jim MacKay, is an American politician. He serves as a Democratic member for the Merrimack 18th district of the New Hampshire House of Representatives.
