= Tomahawk Conference (Ohio) =

The Tomahawk Conference was a short-lived athletic confederation that existed in Portage County, Ohio, between 1958 and 1961. Member teams included Windham, Southeast, Crestwood, and Ravenna. It remains the smallest athletic conference in the history of Ohio sports.

Information on the conference has been compiled from primary sources, the Akron Beacon Journal, and the Ravenna Evening Record (later the Ravenna-Kent Record-Courier), two Ohio newspapers both available on microfilm at the Kent State University library.

== History ==
The genesis of the Tomahawk Conference occurred in the early to mid-1950s. First, Windham became an exempted village school in 1953, and because they were no longer under the control of the County Board of Education, were expelled from the Portage County League. Slightly later, three former Portage County League schools, Shalersville, Mantua Township, and Mantua Village, consolidated to become Crestwood. Five schools that had fielded PCL athletic squads in the past, Charlestown, Deerfield, Edinburgh, Paris, and Palmyra, combined to form the Southeast School District. These consolidated schools had substantially more students than the other PCL schools, and although still in the league, were considered too large and strong for the smaller schools, Randolph, Suffield, Garrettsville, Rootstown, Ravenna Township, Atwater, Aurora, and Hiram. The Portage County League was composed entirely of Class A schools, and Southeast and Crestwood had outgrown that classification.

The precipitating event seems to have occurred in September 1957 and involved Windham. Windham had an exceptional football team under Leo Kot (they would go on to be 6-0-1 on the season). At the time, Windham was a four-year high school that operated on the three-year plan; in other words, to be classified as Class A, or small division, they had to play only sophomores through seniors, and they were allowed only 115 boys in those three grades. The reporting date for school enrollment was October 1.

Windham interpreted this rule to mean that they had to have fewer than 115 male students and play no freshmen after September 30. On September 27, 1957, they cut the freshmen players from the team (although three, Buzz Davis, Tom McCleary and Frank Cassetto, had indeed played against Ravenna Township and Garrettsville, as substitutes, primarily to hold the score down, since Coach Kot was known to be loath to run up scores). That day, Windham officials sent their official numbers, 103 boys in grades 10-12, to the State Athletic Commission.

Windham had played one more game before September 27—against Mogadore, and had whipped them 20-6 without using the freshmen. Ned Novell, the Mogadore coach, contacted Ravenna Township and Garrettsville about whether Windham had used freshmen in their games, and then protested to the state that since Windham had violated Rule 2, Section 2 of the Classification of Schools, they had no right to be classified as Class A. Rather, since they had used freshmen at one point in the season, they could not claim that they were a three-year school, and should be reclassified as Class AA.

Novell was not doing this because of any effect on football – classification meant nothing in football, since all football champions in Ohio were "mythical" poll winners at that time. What he was doing was looking forward one season – to make sure that Windham could not play in the Class A state basketball tournament, but would have to participate in the 26-team Class AA competition against the likes of Barberton and Cuyahoga Falls. The Bombers had been basketball district winners the previous year, he knew the Windham team of Coach Dick Schlup would be superb in the 1957-1958 season (indeed, their final record was 18-2), and he did not want Mogadore, which looked to have a powerful Class A squad, to have to face them. Basically, he wanted to eliminate Windham before the tournament.

The State Commission ruled 4-2 against the Bombers, in spite of the fact that the use of freshmen in early season games was a common practice statewide. Apparently, no one had ever filed a formal complaint before Novell's ruse. The male enrollment limit for a 4-year school, Windham's reclassification, to remain Class A was 150 boys in grades 9-12, and Windham had 155 on October 1 (ironically, due to transfers and dropouts, Windham was belatedly well below that number by the time basketball season arrived).

Since Windham was now Class AA, Windham school officials, in October 1957, met at Southeast High School with representatives of Crestwood, Southeast, and Ravenna, the three Class AA (or soon to be AA) schools in the county besides Kent Roosevelt, plus Newton Falls from Trumbull County, to discuss forming a conference among themselves. Andy Boyko, the principal of Windham High School, was the meeting secretary.

Ravenna was interested in joining a new conference, but not in football, as they had already established a healthy independent schedule. Newton Falls, after initial interest in football only, decided not to pursue things further. Thus, the Tomahawk Conference was born (the name was adopted at the next meeting in Ravenna on December 2, 1957. The symbolism of the hatchet is inescapable). Competition would occur among the four schools in basketball, and Southeast, Windham, and Crestwood in football.

League officials were elected at that meeting. The league commissioner was Fred Swasey of Southeast High School, and the league secretary was Albert Holb of the same school. The league constitution called for rotating officers among member schools on a yearly basis, with the commissioner and secretary being from the same school. Windham seems to have been next in line, as Boyko was identified in an Evening Record article as the league secretary-treasurer on November 25, 1958. Track was added as a trophy sport, to be contested beginning in the spring of 1959.

Windham, coached by Leo Kot, won the football championship in 1958, and the Evening Record reports that they received a trophy. Windham and Southeast tied for the 1959 title, and Windham again won the title in 1960. That trophy is the only Tomahawk hardware present in the Windham High School trophy case. The trophy for the 1959 Southeast co-championship team has recently been located and is in their trophy case.

Windham won the baseball title in all three seasons, 1959, 1960, and 1961. Kot also skippered these teams. The 1961 team made it all the way to the state championship, losing to Liberty Union as local legend Bob Higgins pitched back-to-back 9 inning games in less than 24 hours.

Ravenna easily won the track championship in all three years; the tournament was always held on Ravenna's track, and Windham did not even have a track at its school.

Southeast won the first outright championship trophy in school history by claiming the 1959 Tomahawk basketball title, and does possess the trophy from that seminal event. Ravenna, coached by Clair Muscaro, won the basketball title in both 1960 and 1961, in battles that went to the last week of the season. Muscaro later went on to become the Commissioner of the Ohio High School Athletic Association.

On June 2, 1960, representatives of the tiny Tomahawk Conference and the decimated Portage County League met and decided to merge the two loops, leaving Ravenna without a league affiliation once more. Mogadore was not invited to join the league, and Windham, which was holding out for that concession, became the final Tomahawk Conference member to sign on. The new Portage County League began competition with the 1961 football season. The reconstituted PCL existed from 1961 until its demise in 2005, when it became part of the multi-county Portage Trail Conference.
