= Windham High School (Ohio) =

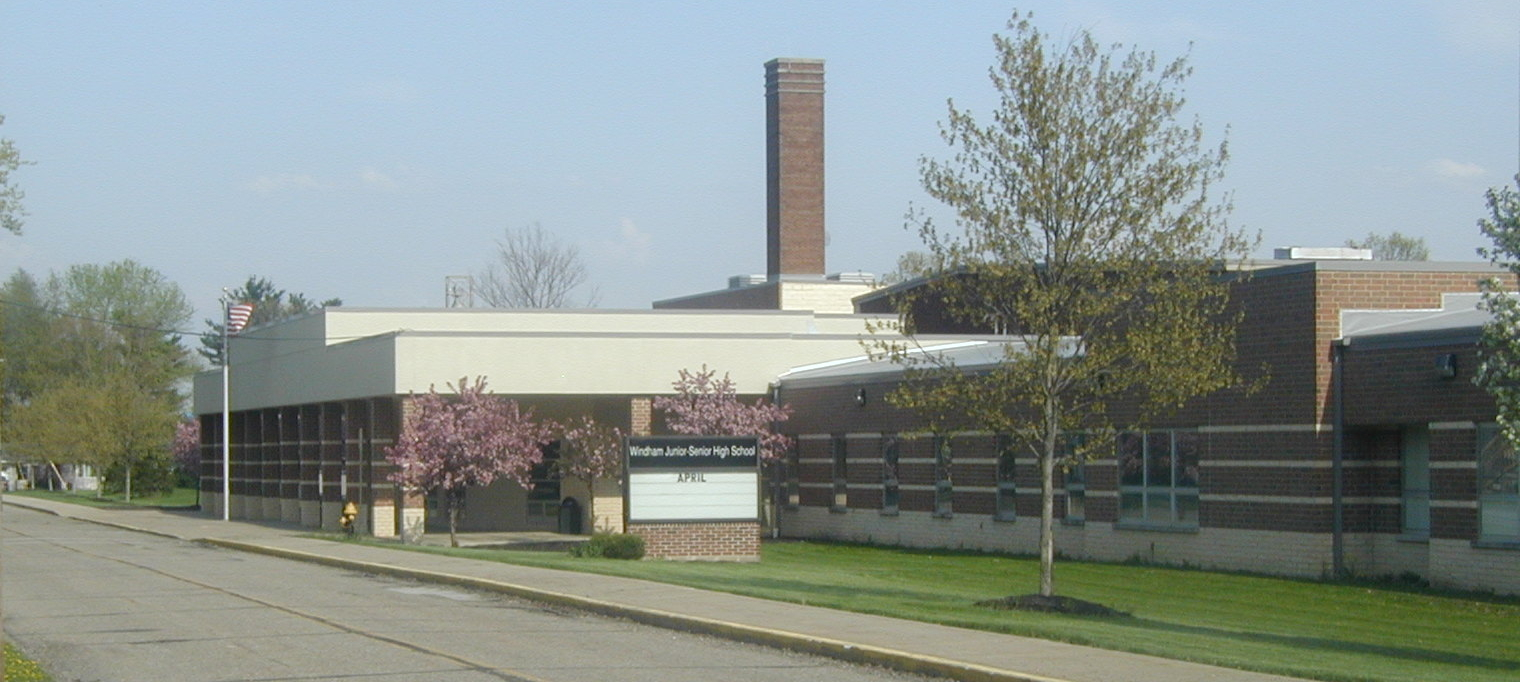
- Windham Junior and Senior High School from the corner of Bauer Avenue and Main Street

Location
- 9530 Bauer Ave; Windham, Ohio 44288; United States; 41.232961°N 81.04743°W

Information
- School type: Public
- Established: 1883
- School district: Windham Exempted Village School District
- CEEB code: 365610
- NCES School ID: 390456602326
- Principal: Zack Burns
- Grades: 9–12
- Enrollment: 106 (2023–24)
- Colors: Black and Vegas gold
- Athletics conference: Northeastern Athletic Conference; Northern 8 Football Conference (Football only)
- Team name: Bombers
- Yearbook: Twin Pines
- Website: www.windham-schools.org/school_home.aspx?schoolid=1

Windham High School is a public high school in Windham, Ohio, that serves students in grades 9–12. It is the only high school in the Windham Exempted Village School District and is housed in the Windham Junior High/High School building along with Windham Junior High School, which serves students in grades 5–8. Their nickname is the Bombers and they compete in the Ohio High School Athletic Association as a member of the Northeastern Athletic Conference, except in football, where they belong to the Northern 8 Football Conference.

== History ==
Windham High School was established in 1883 and was initially for village residents. It became the high school for both the village and Windham Township in 1915.

The nickname of the "Bombers" dates back to 1939, when a local sportswriter referred to the eventual state champion six-man football team as the "Bombers" during a game, likely because of the passing play of their quarterback. Prior to that, the teams were called the "Yellowjackets", dating back to 1928. It is often assumed that the nickname originated from the creation of the Ravenna Army Ammunition Plant, commonly known as the Ravenna Arsenal, which borders the village of Windham and occupies nearly half of Windham Township. The U.S. Government began buying land to create the arsenal in 1940 and it opened in March 1942. The arsenal employed nearly 14,000 people at its peak and Windham was chosen as the location to house many of the workers, resulting in population growth from 316 residents in 1940 to nearly 4,000 by 1950.

== Athletics ==
Windham High School currently offers:

- Baseball
- Basketball
- Cross country
- Cheerleading
- Football (8-man)
- Golf
- Softball
- Track and field
- Volleyball

=== Associated Press state championships ===
Boys basketball - 1978

== Notable alumni ==
- Thomson Jay Hudson - world-renowned researcher in parapsychology
- Angela Johnson - children's book author
- Laurin D. Woodworth - Civil War major and former member of the United States House of Representatives
