= Windham Exempted Village School District =

Public school district in Ohio, United States

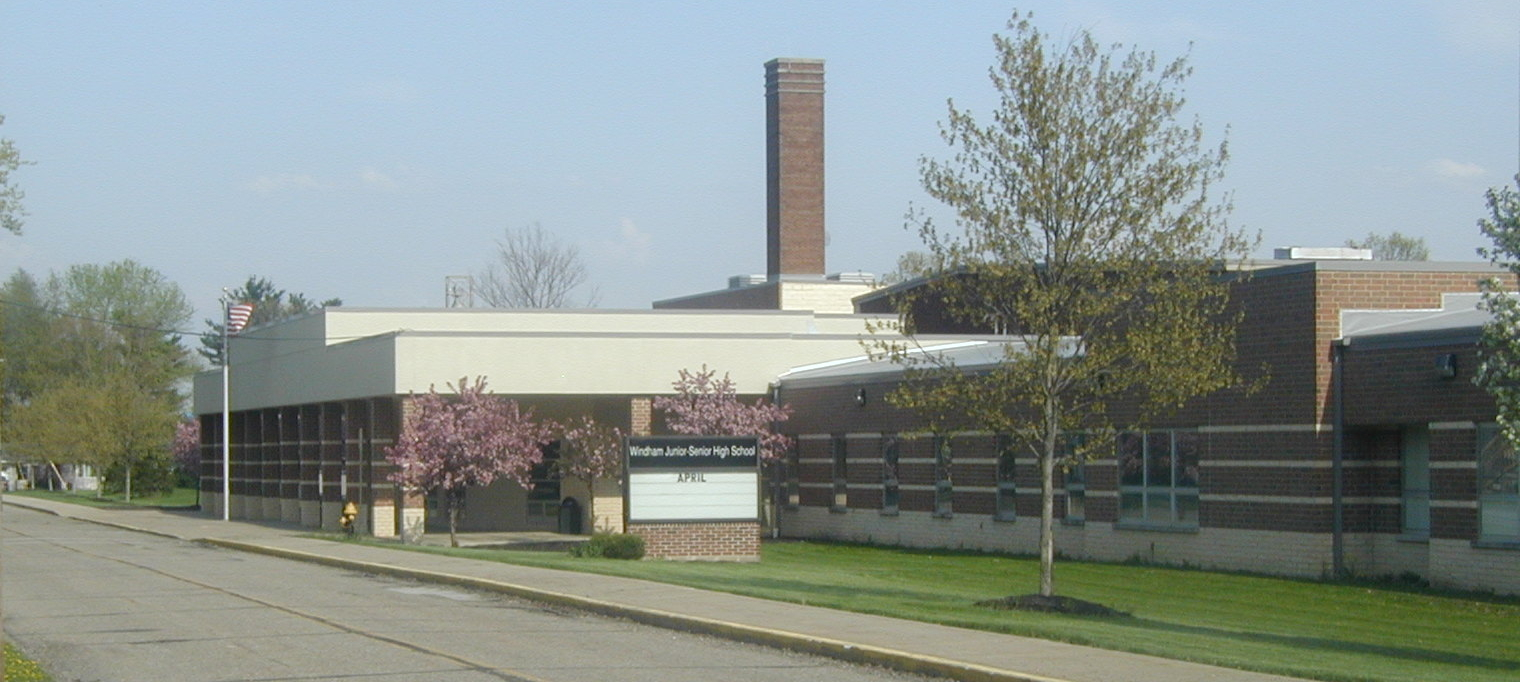

Address
- 9530 Bauer Avenue Windham, Ohio, 44288; United States

District information
- Type: Public
- Grades: PK–12
- Established: 1830; 196 years ago
- Superintendent: Michael Dobran
- Schools: 3
- NCES District ID: 3904566

Students and staff
- Students: 454 (2025–2026)
- Teachers: 39.39 (on an FTE basis) (2025–2026)
- Staff: 99.86 (on an FTE basis) (2025–2026)
- Student–teacher ratio: 11.53 (2025–2026)

Other information
- Website: www.windham-schools.org

The Windham Exempted Village School District is the public school district for the village of Windham and Windham Township in Portage County in the U.S. state of Ohio. The district has one high school, Windham High School; and one elementary school, Katherine Thomas Elementary School.

== History ==
The district was founded as the Windham School Company by act of the Ohio Legislature (O.L., XXVIII, 93) on February 18, 1830.

In 1835, the Windham School Company founded Windham Academy as the 44th institution of secondary education in Ohio. The academy held classes in the building now known as the Brick Chapel in Windham. Windham Academy operated for 18 years, and produced at least one notable graduate: Laurin D. Woodworth, former Representative for Ohio's 17th congressional district. In the 1860s, two new elementary schools were founded in Windham, and the schools were connected to the nascent Ohio State Board of Education. In 1883, these schools produced their first high school graduates.

== Schools ==
=== High School ===
- Windham High School

=== Middle School ===
- Windham Junior High School

=== Elementary School ===
- Katherine Thomas Elementary School
