= Jim Bouley =

American politician (born 1966)

Mayor of Concord
- In office January 2008 – January 4, 2024
- Preceded by: Michael Donovan
- Succeeded by: Byron Champlin

Personal details
- Born: James Paul Bouley; 1966 (age 59–60)
- Party: Democratic
- Spouse: Tara Reardon
- Education: University of New Hampshire (BA)

James Paul Bouley (born 1966) is an American politician who served as the mayor of Concord, New Hampshire, from January 2008 to January 2024.

Bouley's father, Dick, is a lobbyist who worked for Governor Hugh Gallen in the late 1970s. Bouley graduated from the University of New Hampshire in 1988.

Bouley moved to Concord in 1984. He was elected to the Concord City Council representing Ward 10 in 1997. In 2007, he was elected mayor of Concord. Bouley cited the opioid/methamphetamine crisis as the most pressing issue in the city. He prioritized Interstate 93's design to make sure it was in the best interest of the city, as well as development along Stickney Avenue. Bouley presided over a $15 million revitalization of the downtown area, and he received the Business Leader of the Year Award by the Concord Chamber of Commerce in 2017. He supported refugee resettlement in Concord, as the city received the most refugees in New Hampshire. He criticized racist messages that appeared on a Somali family's home and supports diversity in the city. Bouley voted against a large apartment complex by Dol-Soul Properties in August 2019.

Alongside former Republican National Committeeman Mike Dennehy, Bouley runs an influential government affairs firm. Bouley endorsed Hillary Clinton for president in 2016 and Cory Booker in the 2020 primaries. Bouley is Concord's longest-serving mayor and was re-elected to his seventh term in November 2019, receiving 3,901 votes to Linda Banfill's 994.

== Awards and recognition ==
In 2017, Bouley received the Greater Concord Chamber of Commerce's ‘‘Business Leader of the Year’’ award."Jim Bouley". Wikipedia. In 2023, he was named the Chamber's ‘‘Outstanding Citizen of the Year’’ in recognition of his contributions to Concord and his sixteen years as mayor."Jim Bouley honored as Citizen of the Year". Greater Concord Chamber of Commerce. November 1, 2023.

== Personal life ==
Bouley resides in Concord with his wife, Tara. Following his tenure as mayor, he continued serving the city as a member of the Concord Semiquincentennial and Tri-Centennial Committee."Ad-Hoc Semiquincentennial & Tri-Centennial Committee". City of Concord.

== See also ==
- List of mayors of Concord, New Hampshire

Political offices
Preceded by Michael Donovan	Mayor of Concord; 2008–2024	Succeeded by Byron Champlin
