= Red Rock Island =

Island in San Francisco Bay, California, United States of America

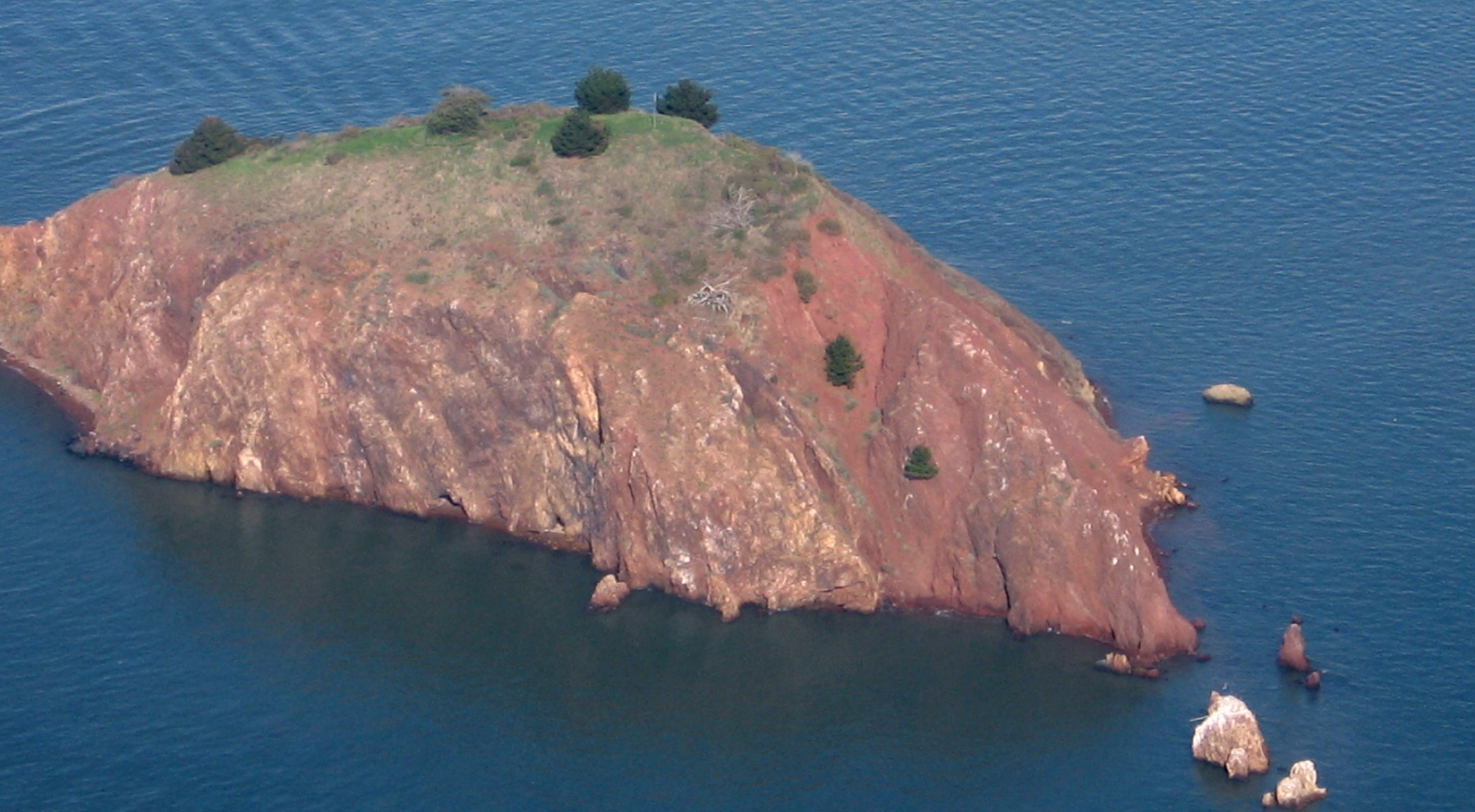
- Aerial photograph of Red Rock Island

- Location within San Francisco Bay Area Location within California Location within the United States

Geography
- Coordinates: 37°55′45″N 122°25′51″W
- Total islands: 1
- Area: 0.0234718 km^{2} (0.0090625 sq mi)
- Highest elevation: 46 m (151 ft)

Administration
- United States
- State: California
- County: San Francisco, Marin, and Contra Costa

Demographics
- Population: 0 (2024)

Red Rock Island (variously known as Moleta, Molate Rock, and Golden Rock) is an uninhabited, 5.8-acre (2.3 ha) island in San Francisco Bay located just south of the Richmond–San Rafael Bridge. The property is the only privately owned island in San Francisco Bay. The boundaries of three counties – San Francisco, Marin, and Contra Costa – converge on the island. The Contra Costa portion (most of the island) is incorporated inside the city limits of Richmond.

Abandoned Coast Guard fog bell on southern point of island

The mountain of bright red earth and rock is 500 ft (150 m) across from east to west, 750 ft (230 m) from north to south, and rises out of the bay to a height of 151 ft (46 m). It is surrounded by some of the deepest water in the North Bay, nearly 60 ft (18 m) deep.

== History ==
Early Spanish explorers named the island "Moleta Island" after the color of the rocks. It was charted in 1827 by Royal Navy captain Frederick Beechey, who called it "Molate Island", a distortion of the Spanish name.

Selim E. Woodworth was the first owner and resident of Red Rock Island, where in the 19th century he built a cabin and maintained a hunting preserve. The island also appeared, again labeled "Molate Island", on an 1850 survey map of the San Francisco Bay area made by Cadwalader Ringgold and an 1854 map of the area by Henry Lange. The island was also referred to as "Golden Island" because a local legend held that pirates buried their treasure on it. For the same reason it was later called "Treasure Island".

The island was once mined for manganese, the mineral which gave the rocks their distinctive color. Two hundred tons of ore were removed by speculators, including Norwegian and Swedish mariners, who used the rock for ballast and then sold it to paint manufacturers in Europe. The U.S. government, which owned the island at the time, put a stop to that practice. The mining of the island left it riddled with tunnels.

The island was privately purchased in the 1920s. After a series of owners, David Glickman, at the time a San Francisco attorney and part-time real estate buyer, purchased the island in 1964 for US$49,500.

In the 1980s, a plan was proposed (but never implemented) to remove the top half of the island (which would be sold for highway roadbed construction). The island would then be developed with a 10-story hotel and casino, and a yacht harbor on the lee (north) side. Water and power would be provided from lines connected to the San Rafael Bridge.

In the 21st century, the island was placed on the market multiple times:

- in 2001, offer to buy the island was made to the California Department of Fish and Game;
- in June 2007, Glickman, at the time a gem dealer in Thailand, announced that Red Rock Island was for sale for US$10 million;
- in early 2012, the island was listed with a realtor at a price of US$5 million;
- in late 2023 Brock Durning, who inherited the island from his father, Mack Durning, placed the island on the market for US$25 million, first time this property was offered through a multiple listing service.
- on August 15, 2024, it was reported the island had found a buyer the previous month, but the identity of who purchased it and for how much was likely to remain unknown until some time in 2025. “It will be a lengthy process with close of escrow not happening till next year,” said the property's listing agent, Chris Lim.

== In popular culture ==
The island and its history is discussed in the 2009 novel Spade and Archer by Joe Gores. It was also mentioned and described as "Blue Island" in the novel The Circle by Dave Eggers.

== See also ==
- List of islands of California
