= Selim E. Woodworth =

American politician

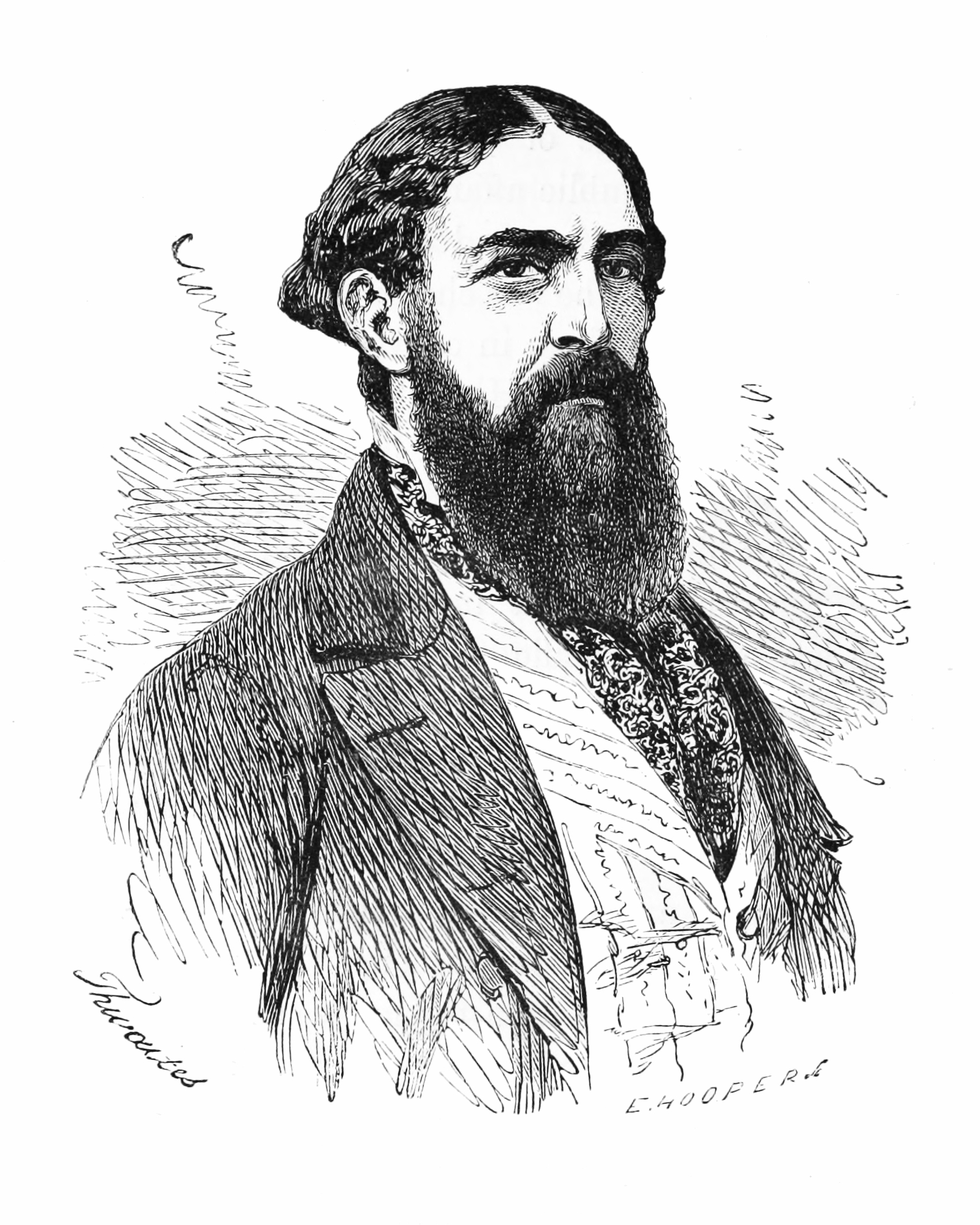

Member of the California Senate from the Monterey district
- In office 1849–1851

Personal details
- Born: November 27, 1815 New York, New York
- Died: January 29, 1871 (aged 55) San Francisco, California
- Relations: Woodworth political family
- Profession: Businessman

Military service
- Allegiance: United States of America
- Branch/service: United States Navy
- Years of service: 1838–1849; 1861–1866
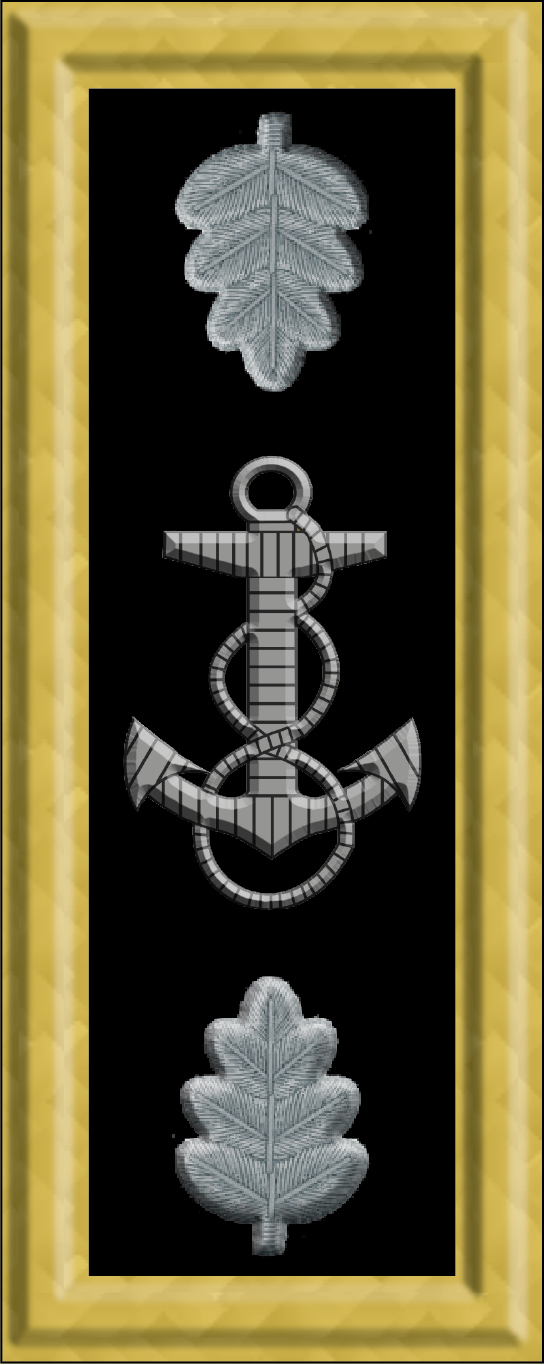
- Rank: commander
- Commands: USS Anita; USS John P. Jackson; USS Glide; USS General Price; USS Narragansett; USS Monocacy
- Battles/wars: Mexican–American War; American Civil War

Selim E. Woodworth (November 27, 1815 – January 29, 1871) was a commander in the United States Navy, prominent San Francisco businessman, and member of the Woodworth political family.

== Early years ==
Woodworth was born in New York City, the second son of poet and dramatist Samuel Woodworth. He was a descendant of colonial settler Walter Woodworth. At age twelve he and his friend Tom Jacobs ran away to cross the continent, but relatives living north of the city apprehended them in the Catskills. In 1834, Woodworth and Jacobs sailed as captain's clerks on the ship Margaret Oakley, captained by Benjamin Morrell. Morrell explored islands in the Bismark Sea and established trading relations with previously uncontacted native inhabitants. Woodworth and Jacobs found an uninhabited atoll suitable for a new colony, a project they considered years later without ever making much progress. During Margaret Oakley's return, she wrecked while at anchor near a pirate trading colony in Madagascar, but there is suspicion that Morrell staged the wreck so he could sell the ship's cargo for personal gain. Woodworth eventually reached Mauritius and returned to New York after an absence of four years. Morrell, was now seen as piratical and on the run from authorities.

== U.S. Navy career ==
Although Woodworth was associated with the disastrous and piratical Margaret Oakley expedition, he was not held culpable and his father worked to have him enlisted into the Navy. Appointed a midshipman on June 16, 1838, Woodworth was ordered to join the Wilkes Exploring Expedition because of the Polynesian language ability he had acquired in the Pacific. Because his orders were misdirected, he arrived to find the expedition had already sailed. He was instead sent to the Mediterranean Sea for duty in the ship of the line Ohio. On August 3, he was detached for a three-month leave; he received an additional leave of three months to visit Milan, Italy, and on December 24 was ordered to join the Falmouth, then fitting out at New York.

While serving on Falmouth, he learned of his father's death and returned to New York where he was assigned to the receiving ship North Carolina. He served on Lawrence and then entered the Philadelphia Naval School. On May 20, 1844, Woodworth was warranted a passed midshipman. After six months leave, he reported to the Jamestown, a new sloop-of-war, and served on the coast of Africa, helping suppress the slave trade. He was transferred to Truxtun, but detached on November 24, 1845, and granted a three-month leave.

In 1846, with the United States on the brink of war with Mexico, Woodworth was assigned to carry dispatches about the Navy's participation overland to the Pacific Squadron in Oregon. He set out with two companions from Independence, Missouri, on May 14 and arrived in Oregon 98 days later.

== California pioneer ==
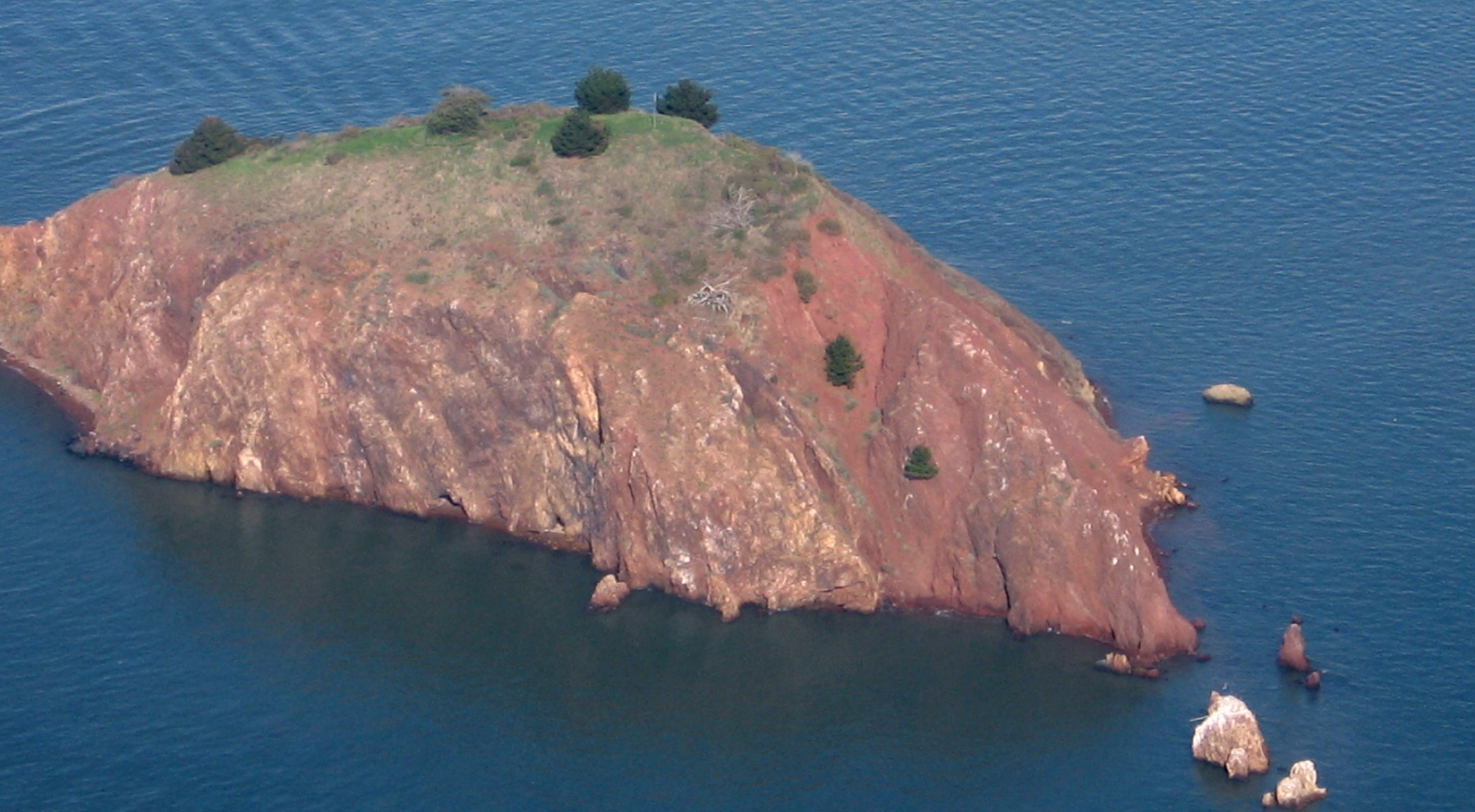
Woodworth was the first owner and resident of Red Rock Island

Woodworth reported to naval authorities at the mouth of the Columbia River, where he remained until January 18, 1847, when he left for San Francisco. There he volunteered for the rescue efforts on behalf of the Donner Party, a group of overland emigrants that was trapped and starving in the Sierra Nevada. He was put in command and on February 7 sailed for Sacramento with supplies. He trekked into the mountains with men and provisions, but he failed to meet the rescue parties that were hoping to rendezvous with him. Donner Party survivors and rescuers regarded him as "a braggart who had let them down".

Woodworth arrived back in San Francisco on April 1, 1847, and reported on board sloop-of-war Warren at Monterey Bay, California, on May 17, 1847. On October 8, he requested a leave of absence in order to make a trip across the southern part of South America. He left Warren on February 16, 1848, to take command of the bark Anita. From June 5, 1848, until 1850, naval registers carry him as attached to the Pacific Squadron; however, no record of him has ever been found.

In November 1849, a year before California became a state, Woodworth was elected to the legislature as a senator representing Monterey and immediately resigned his Navy commission. For a little more than a decade, he lived in San Francisco and played a prominent role in the development of the state. He and his brother Frederick were among the organizers of the vigilance committee, and Selim was the group's first President. Woodworth and his sons and brothers were original members of the Society of California Pioneers. With his brother, Woodworth ran Case, Heiser & Company, a successful commission merchant business. An abolitionist, Woodworth is credited with defining the state's policies concerning slavery while serving in California's first legislature.

Woodworth and his brother built the first house in San Francisco situated on a water lot, which later became the Clay Street Market. He owned several properties with his brother, including the lot at Market and Second Street that was later the site of the Grand Hotel. He was also the first owner and resident of Red Rock Island, where he built a cabin and maintained a hunting preserve.

== Civil War service ==
U.S. President Abraham Lincoln recommended Woodworth receive special thanks from Congress for his service in the war

After the outbreak of the American Civil War, Woodworth returned to the east coast and reentered the Navy on September 10, 1861, as an acting lieutenant. On January 13, 1862, he assumed command of John P. Jackson, a former ferry boat converted to a steam gunboat. This vessel was assigned to the Mortar Flotilla raised by Comdr. David D. Porter to support Flag Officer David Farragut's conquest of New Orleans, Louisiana, and the lower Mississippi River. He assisted in the capture of Forts Jackson and St. Philip in April and participated in operations around Vicksburg, Mississippi, in June and July. Porter commended Woodworth for these services, and President Abraham Lincoln recommended him to Congress for special thanks. On September 29, 1862, at his own request, he was detached from command of John P. Jackson and allowed to return to the North. Later that autumn, he was assigned to the Mississippi Squadron and reported at Cairo, Illinois, for duty.

On January 1, 1863, he was given command of Glide, a "tinclad," stern-wheel steamer. On January 24, Porter—now a Rear Admiral—recommended Woodworth for appointment to the regular Navy. Woodworth was commissioned a commander in April 1863, effective from July 16, 1862. After Glide was burned, he commanded the ram General Price from February 7, 1863, through August. After months of fighting up and down the Mississippi, Comdr. Woodworth was detached from General Price and sent to the Pacific where he took command of the bark Narragansett on October 7, 1863. After bringing Narragansett around Cape Horn, he reached New York on March 18, 1865. Monocacy, a double-ended gunboat, was his last command, which he assumed on November 30, 1865.

== Later years and legacy ==
Comdr. Selim E. Woodworth resigned from the Navy on March 2, 1866, and returned to San Francisco, where he lived with his family until his death in 1871.

The destroyer USS Woodworth (DD-460) (1942–1951) was named for him.

== Marriage and family ==
Woodworth married Lisette, by whom he had six children: Selim II, who married a daughter of California pioneer and assemblyman James S. Wethered; Frederick, who was suspended from the U.S. Naval Academy for hazing; and Benjamin, William, Lydia, and Samuel. After Woodworth's death in 1871, Lisette married Erasmus Dennison, son of Ohio Governor William Dennison Jr.

Lisette Woodworth testified in the state civil rights case Pleasant v. North Beach & Mission Railroad Company on behalf of Mary Ellen Pleasant, who had been refused service on a San Francisco streetcar in 1866. Pleasant, a Black abolitionist and entrepreneur, worked for the Woodworths earlier in the 1860s. The case outlawed segregation on public transportation in California.
