= Jacob A. Ambler =

American lawyer and politician

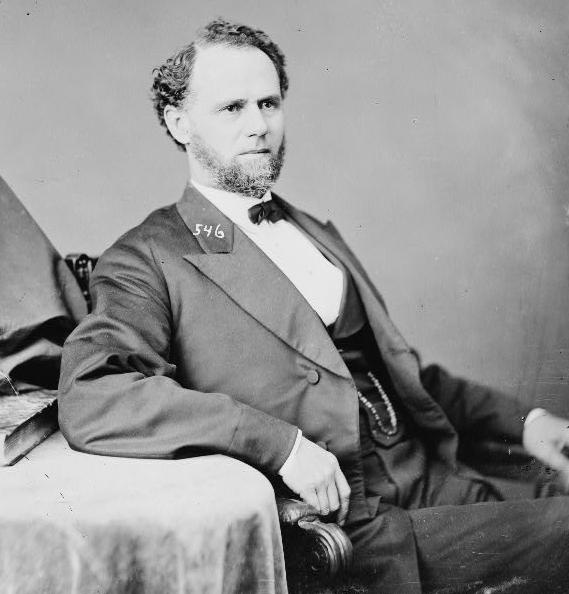

Member of the U.S. House of Representatives from Ohio's 17th district
- In office March 4, 1869 – March 3, 1873
- Preceded by: Ephraim R. Eckley
- Succeeded by: Laurin D. Woodworth

Member of the Ohio House of Representatives from the Columbiana County district
- In office January 4, 1858 – January 1, 1860
- Preceded by: John Hunter; Moses Mendenhall
- Succeeded by: J. K. Rukenbrod

Personal details
- Born: February 18, 1829 Pittsburgh, Pennsylvania
- Died: September 22, 1906 (aged 77) Canton, Ohio
- Resting place: Hope Cemetery, Salem, Ohio
- Party: Republican

Jacob A. Ambler (February 18, 1829 – September 22, 1906) was an American lawyer and politician who served as a U.S. representative from Ohio for two terms from 1869 to 1873.

== Early life and career ==
Born in Pittsburgh, Pennsylvania, Ambler attended the local schools of Allegheny City and also received private instruction. He moved to Salem, Ohio, and studied law in his brother's law office. He was admitted to the bar on March 27, 1851, and commenced practice in Salem, Ohio.

== Political career ==
Ambler was elected to the State house of representatives in 1857 and served two terms. He was appointed judge of the ninth judicial district in 1859 and served until 1867.

=== Congress ===
Ambler was elected as a Republican to the Forty-first and Forty-second Congresses (March 4, 1869 – March 3, 1873). He declined to be a candidate for renomination in 1872.

== Later career and death ==
He resumed the practice of law and also became interested in various business enterprises in Salem, Ohio. He served as vice president of a bank and of a steel and wire nail mill corporation and also as president of a publishing company. He served as a delegate to every Republican National Convention between 1876 and 1896. He was appointed a member of the United States Tariff Commission by President Arthur in 1882. He retired from the general practice of law in 1898 but continued active business pursuits until his death in Canton, Ohio, September 22, 1906. He was interred in Hope Cemetery, Salem, Ohio.

== Sources ==
- United States Congress. "Jacob A. Ambler (id: A000169)". Biographical Directory of the United States Congress.

U.S. House of Representatives
Preceded by Ephraim R. Eckley	Member of the U.S. House of Representatives from Ohio's 17th congressional district March 4, 1869 - March 3, 1873	Succeeded by Laurin D. Woodworth
