= USS Glide (1862) =

Gunboat of the United States Navy

History

United States
- Name: USS Glide
- Completed: 1862
- Acquired: November 17, 1862
- Commissioned: December 3, 1862
- Fate: Burned, February 7, 1863

General characteristics
- Type: Tinclad sternwheel steamer
- Tonnage: 137 tons
- Complement: 38
- Armament: 6 × 24 pdr (11 kg) Dahlgren guns

USS Glide was a sternwheel steamer that served as a tinclad warship during the American Civil War. Built in 1862, the Union Navy purchased her for military service late that year. After being converted to a tinclad and armed with six 24-pounder Dahlgren guns, she entered service with the Mississippi River Squadron in early January 1863. Later that month, she saw action in the Battle of Arkansas Post, firing on Confederate-held Fort Hindman. Sent the next month to Cairo, Illinois, for repairs, Glide was destroyed in a fire of uncertain origin on February 7.

== Construction and characteristics ==
The American Civil War began in 1861, and the Union and the Confederacy purchased civilian steamboats for riverine warfare. The Union converted some of these steamboats into a class of vessels known as tinclad warships. These vessels were armored with thin iron armor, in comparison to the heavier armored ironclads, and had light drafts. One of these vessels purchased and converted into a tinclad was the sternwheel steamer Glide. She was built at Shousetown, Pennsylvania, in 1862, and was purchased on November 17, under the authority of Acting Rear Admiral David Dixon Porter while the vessel was at Pittsburgh, Pennsylvania. It cost the government $16,500 to purchase Glide. Her tonnage was 137 tons, while her further dimensions are unknown.

The process of converting Glide into a tinclad occurred at Cincinnati, Ohio, and Glide was then sent to Cairo, Illinois, to be fitted out. While at Cairo, it was deemed necessary to reconstruct some of her gun ports, as they were not considered satisfactory. On December 3, she was commissioned. Armed with six 24-pounder Dahlgren guns, she was commanded by Acting Lieutenant Selim E. Woodworth. She was crewed by a complement of 38, of whom 30 were African American.

== Service history ==
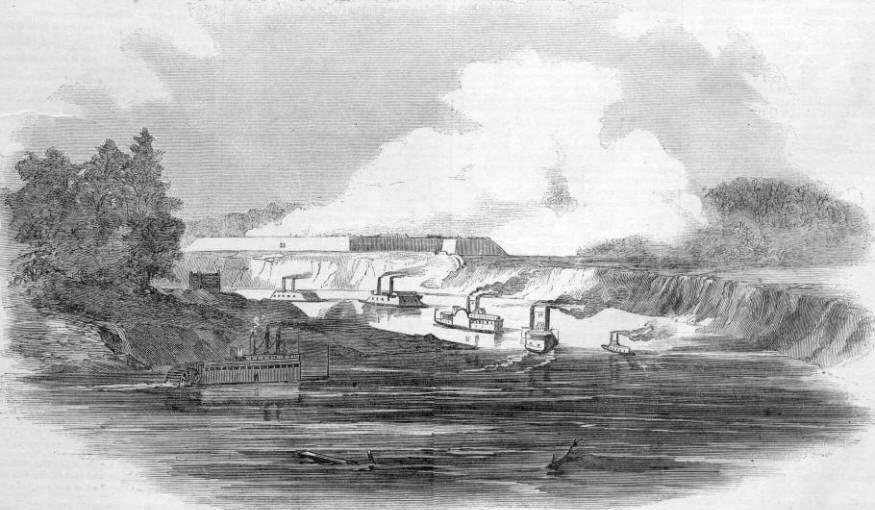
Union vessels approaching Fort Hindman

On January 3, 1863, Glide traveled down the Mississippi River to begin service with the Mississippi River Squadron. The next day, she was assigned to a flotilla of tinclads led by Lieutenant Commander Watson Smith that had been organized for operations against Confederate-held Fort Hindman. On January 11, Union Army forces assaulted the fort, and Glide, along with other vessels, provided supporting fire against Confederate batteries at Fort Hindman. Glide moved upriver to fire into the fort from its rear and, once the fort was captured, attempt to cut off the Confederate retreat. Along with the tinclad USS Rattler, Glide destroyed a ferry upriver from the fort. After the battle, Glide saw service on the White River, being used as both a transport and as a supply ship. In early February, she was sent back to Cairo to undergo repairs.

While moored near other vessels on the morning of February 7, a fire broke out on Glide, in the forward part of the ship. The tugboat USS Dahlia towed her into the channel of the Mississippi River away from the other vessels. Glide then drifted downstream for 1 mile (1.6 km) or 2 miles (3.2 km), ending up on the Kentucky side of the river near Fort Holt. Some of her ammunition exploded, and while in 5 feet (1.5 m) of water, Glide burned to the waterline. Two of her crew died in the incident. The Union military later salvaged portions of her machinery, metal fittings (including some of her armor), and at least a portion of her weapons and ammunition. The origin of the fire is uncertain, but an investigation into the loss of the ship suggested it may have originated with a fire in an ashpan some of the crew had been using to warm themselves. Another tinclad named USS Glide served with the West Gulf Blockading Fleet in 1864 and 1865.

== Sources ==
- Christ, Mark K. (2010). Civil War Arkansas 1863: The Battle for a State. Norman, Oklahoma: University of Oklahoma Press. ISBN 978-0-8061-4433-7.
- Gaines, W. Craig (2008). Encyclopedia of Civil War Shipwrecks. Baton Rouge, Louisiana: Louisiana State University Press. ISBN 978-0-8071-3274-6.
- Official Records of the Union and Confederate Navies in the War of the Rebellion, Series 1. Vol. 24. Washington, D.C.: Government Printing Office. 1911.
- Official Records of the Union and Confederate Navies in the War of the Rebellion, Series 2. Vol. 1. Washington, D.C.: Government Printing Office. 1921.
- Palucka, Tim (2017). "Timberclads, Tinclads, and Cottonclads in the US Civil War". MRS Bulletin. 42 (1): 73. Bibcode:2017MRSBu..42...73P. doi:10.1557/mrs.2016.317. ISSN 1938-1425.
- Shea, William L.; Winschel, Terrence J. (2003). Vicksburg Is the Key: The Struggle for the Mississippi River. Lincoln, Nebraska: University of Nebraska Press. ISBN 978-0-8032-9344-1.
- Silverstone, Paul H. (1989). Warships of the Civil War Navies. Annapolis, Maryland: Naval Institute Press. ISBN 0-87021-783-6.
- Smith, Myron J. (2010). Tinclads in the Civil War: Union Light-Draught Gunboat Operations on Western Waters, 1862–1865. Jefferson, North Carolina: McFarland & Company. ISBN 978-0-7864-3579-1.
- Tomblin, Barbara Brooks (2016). The Civil War on the Mississippi: Union Sailors, Gunboat Captains, and the Campaign to Control the River. Lexington, Kentucky: University Press of Kentucky. ISBN 9780813167046.
