= Lisa Beaudoin =

American politician

Member-elect of the New Hampshire House of Representatives from the Merrimack 18th district
- Assuming office December 2026
- Succeeding: James MacKay

Personal details
- Party: Democratic

Lisa Beaudoin is an American politician. A member of the Democratic Party, she is the member-elect for the Merrimack 18th district of the New Hampshire House of Representatives.
