= Thomas B. Woodworth =

American politician (1841–1904)

Member of the Michigan House of Representatives from the Huron County district
- In office 1877–1878

Personal details
- Born: October 2, 1841 Jamestown, New York
- Died: January 16, 1904 (aged 62) Caseville, Michigan
- Party: Republican
- Education: Cazenovia Seminary
- Profession: lawyer

Thomas B. Woodworth (October 2, 1841 – January 16, 1904) was a newspaper publisher, lawyer, and member of the Woodworth political family.

== Life ==
Woodworth was born in 1841 in Chautauqua County, New York, the son of Stephen Woodworth. He graduated from the Cazenovia Seminary. In 1866 his father removed from New York to Michigan, in which Thomas followed the next year. He maintained a home in Caseville, where he raised his six young children with his wife, Margaret, and entered the bar to practice law.

Between 1868 and 1876, Thomas served as the supervisor for the township of Caseville, and he also served for two years as the county surveyor. In 1874, he founded the Caseville Advertiser, serving as its publisher and editor until 1876, when it merged with the Huron County News. In 1877, he was elected to the Michigan Legislature, serving a term.

Woodworth was a member of the York Rite, and valued political campaign speaker in the state of Michigan for the Republican Party.

== Marriage and children ==
Thomas married Margaret Smith of New York, and they had six children:

- Paul O. Woodworth, county prosecutor, defense lawyer, political insider
- Paul B. Woodworth, graduate of Michigan Agricultural College, Cornell University, and University of Berlin; served as Professor of Physics at MAC
- Robert Woodworth, died shortly after graduating from Michigan Agricultural College
- Fred L. Woodworth, Michigan State Senator and Representative
- John Woodworth, died young
- Gertrude Elizabeth Woodworth
