= Windham, Ohio =

- Village
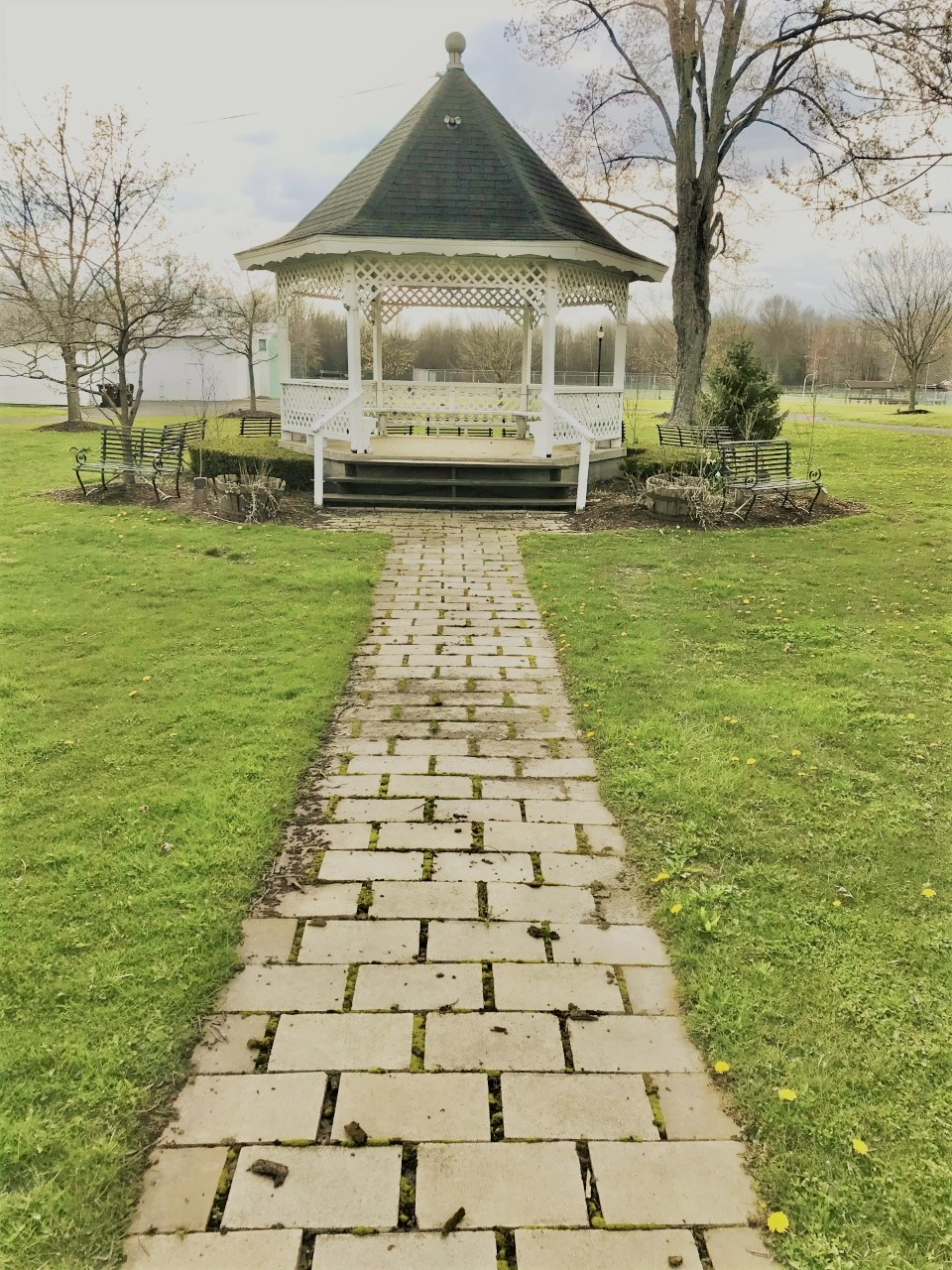
- Windham Park
- Motto: "United We Stand"
- Interactive map of Windham, Ohio
- Location within Ohio Location within the United States
- Coordinates: 41°14′15″N 81°02′14″W
- Country: United States
- State: Ohio
- County: Portage
- Incorporated: 1892

Area
  - Total: 2.06 sq mi (5.33 km^{2})
  - Land: 2.06 sq mi (5.33 km^{2})
  - Water: 0.0039 sq mi (0.01 km^{2})
- Elevation: 965 ft (294 m)

Population (2020)
  - Total: 1,666
  - Density: 809.9/sq mi (312.69/km^{2})
- Time zone: UTC-5 (Eastern (EST))
  - Summer (DST): UTC-4 (EDT)
- ZIP code: 44288
- Area codes: 330, 234
- FIPS code: 39-85946
- GNIS feature ID: 2399712
- Website: windhamvillage.com

Windham is a village in eastern Portage County, Ohio, United States. The population was 1,666 at the 2020 census. In 1942, the U.S. government chose Windham as the site of an army camp for workers at the newly built Ravenna Arsenal. As a result, Windham experienced the largest increase in population of any municipality in the nation over the 1940s, at 1,148.7%.

Windham is officially considered part of Akron metropolitan area; however, it is slightly closer to Youngstown than Akron and significantly closer to Warren at 12.8 miles (20.6 km) away, even closer than the county seat of Ravenna. Due to this, the village also positions itself in relation to cities in the Mahoning Valley. Accordingly, the sole bank in Windham holds membership in the Youngstown-Warren Regional Chamber of Commerce.

== History ==
Prior to 1811, the land now comprising the Village and Township of Windham was owned by Caleb Strong, as part of his holdings through the Ohio Company of Associates. On September 11, 1810, a group of sixteen men met in Becket, Massachusetts at the home of Thatcher Conant to discuss the purchase of land in Ohio for settlement. These men, who would be known as the "Beckett [sic] Land Company", consisted of Conant, Elijah Alford, Nathan Birchard, Gideon Bush, Dillingham Clark, Elisha Clark, Isaac Clark, Benjamin Higley, Aaron P. Jagger, Enos Kingsley, Jeremiah Lyman, Bille Messenger, Ebenezer Messenger, Benjamin C. Perkins, John Seely, and Alpheus Streator.

On November 11, 1810, the Beckett Land Company purchased about 14,825 acres (59.99 km^{2}) from Caleb Strong. The land was divided into 100 lots, and allotted according to each family's investment in the company. Conant, his wife Elizabeth, Dillingham and Abigail Clark, and Alpheus and Anna Streator donated portions of their allotments near the center of the township for a village green, which was common practice for townships in the Connecticut Western Reserve. The group of sixteen families then departed from Massachusetts on May 2, 1811. Six weeks later, they arrived in the purchased survey township, which was located immediately south of Nelson Township in the Connecticut Western Reserve. This new township, known today as Windham Township, was survey town 4 in range 6 of the Western Reserve.

The first religious service in the new township was held on July 28, 1811, in the home of one of the settlers. This service was very likely Congregationalist, as several of the families belonged to the Congregational Church in Becket, Massachusetts. The Congregational Church eventually constructed a building on the Green, and today that church still remains on the Green as a member church of the United Church of Christ.

The Windham Historical Society notes that the township was originally named Strongsburg, however, some sources cite the original name as Strongsburgh. The namesake was original landowner Caleb Strong, who was by then the Governor of Massachusetts. There is some discrepancy in how this township came to be known as Windham. According to the Windham Historical Society, the name of the township "was changed to Sharon, by an act of legislature in about 1820…. A few years later the name was again changed to Windham, which it has remained to present." The Historical Society also cites political concerns as the reason the name was changed from Strongsburg to Sharon. However, on Windham Township's website, March 2, 1813 is cited as the date on which "the Township was made a district by itself and the name was changed to 'Sharon'." The website goes on to state that in 1820, by an act of legislature, the name was changed again to Windham. Yet another source, The Ohio Gazetteer, and Travelers's [sic] Guide, states that the name was changed from Sharon to Windham in January 1829. Still another source places these dates as 1817 and 1820, respectively. Common to most sources are a few claims which reasonably can be ascertained to be fact:

- Caleb Strong was the original namesake of the township.
- The name of the township was changed from Strongsburg/Strongsburgh, to Sharon, and again to Windham.
- The second name change, from Sharon to Windham, was in honor of Windham, Connecticut—home to at least some of the township's original settlers.

On November 22, 1973, a train heading eastbound at 50 mph derailed to a switch being open to an industrial track. Two locomotives and the first twelve cars derailed. The engineer Raymond Wilcox died in the accident. During the investigation it was discovered that two juveniles admitted to placing the switch into the reverse direction.

The Village of Windham was incorporated in 1892, and on October 12, 1993, the village officially withdrew from Windham Township.

=== Ravenna Arsenal ===
In 1940, the United States Department of the Army reserved 21,418 acres (86.68 km^{2}) in eastern Portage County for the construction of two facilities One of these was the Portage Ordnance Depot, which with its twin facility the Ravenna Ordnance Plant became known as the Ravenna Arsenal. Over 14,000 people were employed at the Arsenal during World War II, and the village of Windham was chosen as the site to house many of these workers. Windham experienced a population boom as a result; its growth of over 1100% was the largest of any U.S. municipality in the 1950 Census, as was reported in the June 1951 edition of National Geographic magazine.

== Geography ==
According to the United States Census Bureau, the village has a total area of 2.06 square miles (5.34 km^{2}), all land. Interstate 80 and the Ohio Turnpike pass through the village, although there is presently no interchange in either Windham or Windham Township. Windham's location on the toll highway, however, has in recent years caused an expansion of 3G wireless communication services for the people of Windham.

== Demographics ==
Historical population
Census	Pop.	Note	%±
1900	283		—
1910	261		−7.8%
1920	314		20.3%
1930	374		19.1%
1940	316		−15.5%
1950	3,946		1,148.7%
1960	3,777		−4.3%
1970	3,360		−11.0%
1980	3,721		10.7%
1990	2,943		−20.9%
2000	2,806		−4.7%
2010	2,209		−21.3%
2020	1,666		−24.6%
U.S. Decennial Census

=== 2010 census ===
As of the census of 2010, there were 2,209 people, 786 households, and 598 families residing in the village. The population density was 1,072.3 inhabitants per square mile (414.0/km^{2}). There were 1,045 housing units at an average density of 507.3 per square mile (195.9/km^{2}). The racial makeup of the village was 91.2% White, 4.5% African American, 0.2% Native American, 0.2% Asian, 0.5% from other races, and 3.5% from two or more races. Hispanic or Latino of any race were 1.3% of the population.

There were 786 households, of which 45.5% had children under the age of 18 living with them, 39.9% were married couples living together, 29.0% had a female householder with no husband present, 7.1% had a male householder with no wife present, and 23.9% were non-families. 20.0% of all households were made up of individuals, and 6.5% had someone living alone who was 65 years of age or older. The average household size was 2.80 and the average family size was 3.14.

The median age in the village was 31.6 years. 31.1% of residents were under the age of 18; 11.3% were between the ages of 18 and 24; 24.8% were from 25 to 44; 23.4% were from 45 to 64; and 9.6% were 65 years of age or older. The gender makeup of the village was 46.8% male and 53.2% female.

=== 2000 census ===
As of the census of 2000, there were 2,806 people, 959 households, and 729 families residing in the village. The population density was 1,321.4 inhabitants per square mile (510.2/km^{2}). There were 1,143 housing units at an average density of 538.2 per square mile (207.8/km^{2}). The racial makeup of the village was 92.94% White, 4.92% African American, 0.21% Native American, 0.07% Asian, 0.18% from other races, and 1.67% from two or more races. Hispanic or Latino of any race were 0.43% of the population.

There were 959 households, out of which 45.8% had children under the age of 18 living with them, 43.5% were married couples living together, 27.1% had a female householder with no husband present, and 23.9% were non-families. 19.5% of all households were made up of individuals, and 6.3% had someone living alone who was 65 years of age or older. The average household size was 2.93 and the average family size was 3.31.

In the village, the population was spread out, with 35.9% under the age of 18, 10.2% from 18 to 24, 29.2% from 25 to 44, 17.0% from 45 to 64, and 7.7% who were 65 years of age or older. The median age was 28 years. For every 100 females there were 89.5 males. For every 100 females age 18 and over, there were 81.6 males.

The median income for a household in the village was $31,630, and the median income for a family was $32,679. Males had a median income of $30,791 versus $20,859 for females. The per capita income for the village was $11,875. About 23.5% of families and 23.8% of the population were below the poverty line, including 37.1% of those under age 18 and 9.0% of those age 65 or over.

== Education ==
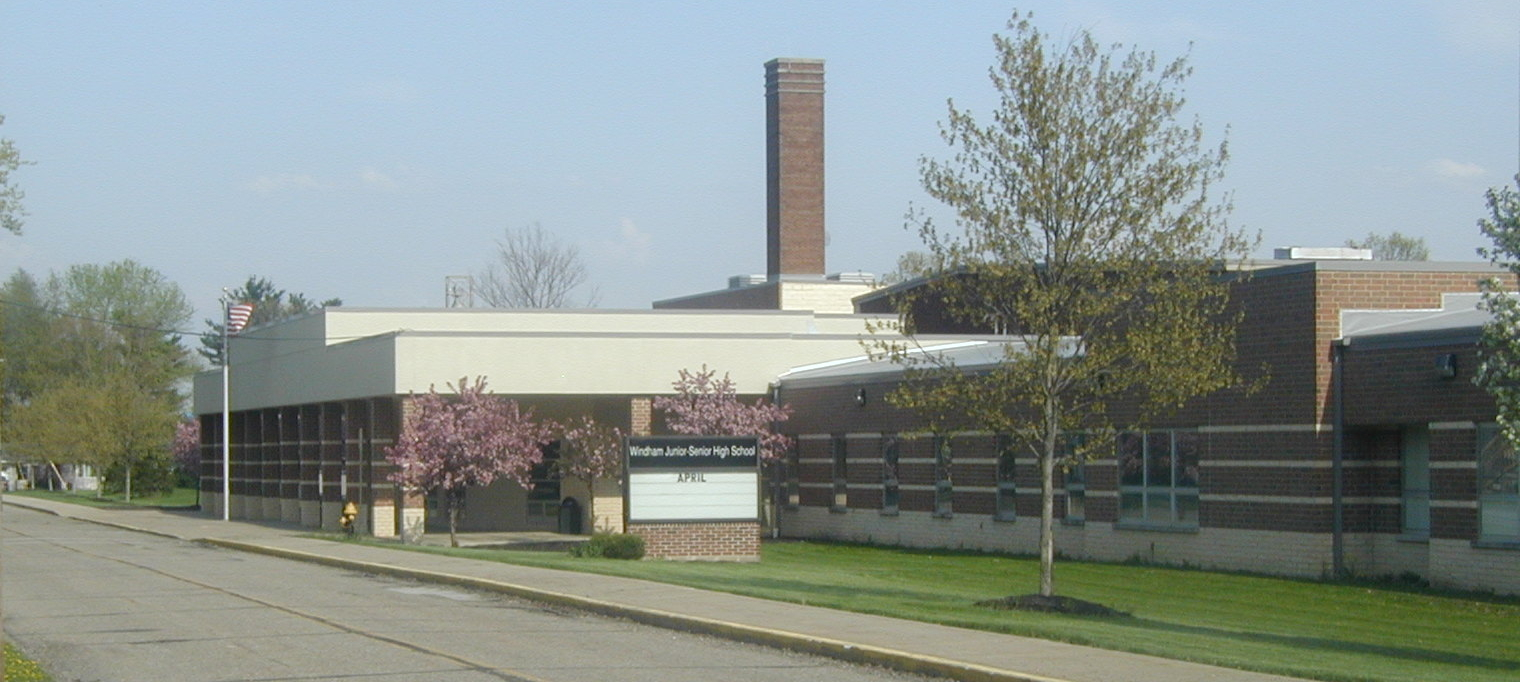
Windham High School

Windham Exempted Village School District operates one elementary school, one middle school, and Windham High School. A private academy was chartered in Windham on February 19, 1835. Windham Academy was the 44th to be chartered by Ohio. This school closed in 1853, and was replaced by a second, short-lived private school in the 1860s. Windham High School was founded in 1883, across the street from the present school building.

Windham has a public library, a branch of the Portage County District Library.

== Infrastructure ==
Windham has regular public transit bus service on a weekday Portage Area Regional Transportation Authority route from Ravenna, that also services Garrettsville and Hiram in eastern Portage County.

== Notable people ==
- Thomson Jay Hudson, parapsychologist
- Angela Johnson, writer
- Stan Parrish, football coach
- Dempster Woodworth, Wisconsin state senator and physician
- Laurin D. Woodworth, politician
