= Albert Woodworth =

American politician (1843–1908)

Member of the New Hampshire Legislature
- In office 1893–1894

Mayor of Concord
- In office 1897–1899

Personal details
- Born: April 7, 1843
- Died: June 24, 1908 (aged 65)
- Party: Republican
- Occupation: businessman

Albert Woodworth (April 7, 1843 – June 24, 1908) was an American businessman and member of the Woodworth political family.

== Early life ==
Woodworth was born in Dorchester, New Hampshire, on April 7, 1843, the son of George Woodworth, whose own father, Sylvanus Woodworth, came to New Hampshire from Lebanon, Connecticut with Eleazer Wheelock and was a soldier in the Revolutionary War. When Albert was two years old his family moved to Hebron, New Hampshire, where he attended district schools and eventually the Boscawen Academy. He would then work for D.E. Willard before pursuing his own business interests.

== Business and later life ==
In 1868, Woodworth ran a general merchandise store in Lisbon, New Hampshire, which also had a tailoring department. After five years, he started a retail grocery business, along with his brother Edward B. Woodworth. In 1875, they purchased Hutchins and Company, which dealt in cement, lime, and feed. In 1901, the company was incorporated as Woodworth and Company, in which Albert was the treasurer.

In 1880, Woodworth became part-owner of the Moosilauke Mountain Hotel Company, known for the "Tip Top House" hotel. In 1883, Woodworth was one of the incorporators of the Parker and Young company, which would become the United States' largest sound board manufacturer. He was the director of the company at its incorporation, and he became president in 1895.

Woodworth was a member of the Sons of the American Revolution, was President of the Board of Trustees of the Margaret Pillsbury General Hospital from 1889 to 1894, trustee of the Episcopal Diocese of New Hampshire, a member of St. Paul's Church (Concord) where he was vestryman, and trustee of the Holderness School. He was a member of the Concord Board of Trade, the Wonalancet Club, the New Hampshire Club of Boston, and the Appalachian Mountain Club.

== Politics ==
Politically, Woodworth was a Republican. He began his political career as an alderman of the 5th ward in Concord, New Hampshire, serving from 1885 to 1889. In 1893, he was elected to the New Hampshire Legislature, serving a term. In 1897, he was elected as Mayor of Concord.

== Family ==
Woodworth married Mary Angeline Parker on September 30, 1873. Parker was a graduate of Vassar College and a New Hampshire socialite. She was a member of the Concord school board, president of the Woman's Club from 1897 to 1899, and was twice president of the Boston branch of Vassar Alumnae.

They had three children, including Edward K., who was a Dartmouth College and Harvard Law School graduate, Grace who was a Gilman School graduate, and Charles Parker, a graduate of Dartmouth.

Woodworth was known as a man of action and fair. He died on June 24, 1908.

== See also ==
- List of mayors of Concord, New Hampshire
