= Benjamin Woodworth =

Coroner and Marshal for Wayne County in Michigan
- In office 1815–1836

Sheriff of Wayne County in Michigan
- In office 1830–1831

Personal details
- Born: December 29, 1782 Scituate, Massachusetts
- Died: November 10, 1874 (aged 91) St. Clair County, Michigan
- Profession: hotelier

Benjamin Woodworth (December 29, 1782 – January 16, 1874), also known as "Uncle Ben", was a captain in the War of 1812, hotelier, a pioneer of the city of Detroit, and member of the Woodworth political family.

== Early life ==
Benjamin was born on December 29, 1782, the son of Benjamin Woodworth, an American Revolution soldier, and Abigail Bryant. He was the brother of Samuel Woodworth. He learned the carpenter trade in Boston during his time in Massachusetts.

== Detroit ==
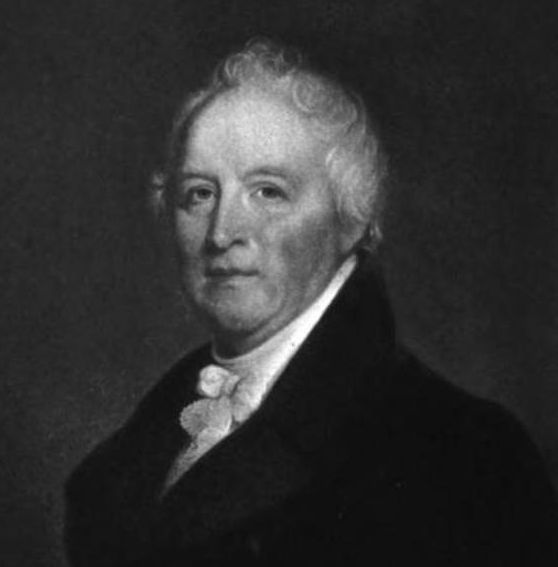
American General William Hull was a close associate of Woodworth

Woodworth had become friends General William Hull, who had recently moved his family to Massachusetts from Connecticut. Thomas Jefferson had appointed Hull Governor of the Northwest Territory and was in need of skilled workers to take with him, in which Woodworth was one of the carpenters he chose to move to Detroit with him. On June 12, 1805, Woodworth and Hull, along with other workers, arrived in Detroit.

=== Construction firsts ===
Hull was not satisfied with his living quarters, and sought to build a new governor's mansion. Upon arriving in Detroit in 1805, he found the city in ashes, the result of a devastating fire. He needed to return to Washington to lobby President Jefferson directly for assistance; this also included finding investors to charter the first bank in Detroit. The lore states that Woodworth accompanied him on this trip to meet with the president.

The men returned from their eastern trip on June 7, 1806, and began construction of the first governor's mansion and First Bank of Detroit. Woodworth's company, Woodworth & Brooks, was commissioned to construct the buildings. The construction of the bank began before the charter was finally approved on September 19, 1806, however, it would collapse financially after opening, with accusations of fraud levied against the charter members; which Woodworth was not a part of. Nonetheless, Woodworth helped build the first bank in Michigan and first Governor's Mansion; also the first brick dwelling in Michigan.

=== Steamboat Hotel ===
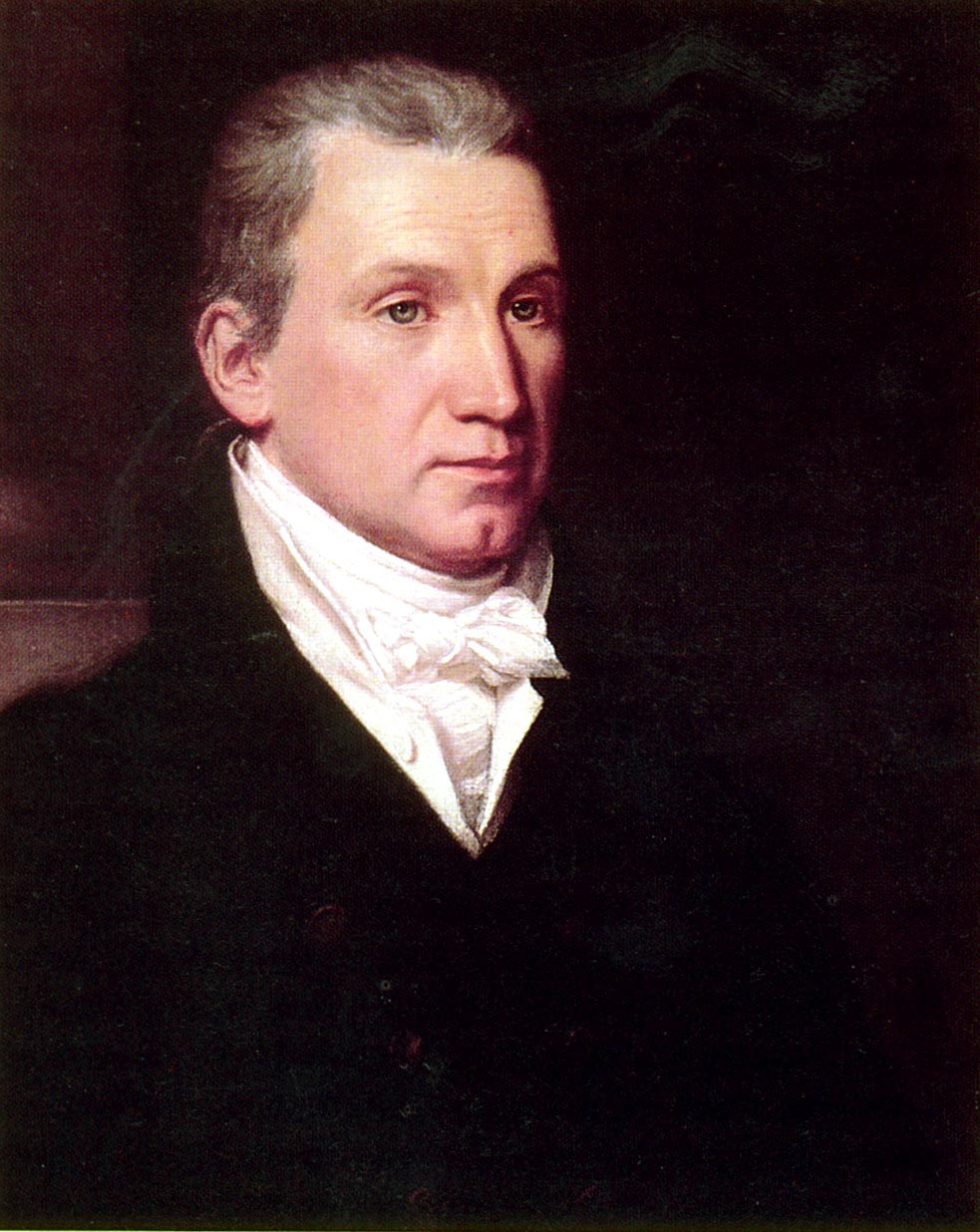
U.S. President James Monroe attended a gala at Woodworth's hotel in 1817

After constructing the bank and mansion, Woodworth himself built his own residence at the corner of Randolph and Woodbridge Streets in 1807. He eventually enlarged it to form the "Woodworth Hotel", later known as the "Steamboat Hotel" after another expansion 1818. It was located at a wharf on the Detroit River. He also operated the first stage coach in Michigan.

The hotel also featured a tavern, and together, they became one of the most famous places of the region, serving as the headquarters steam-boat captains and the transportation industry operating on the Great Lakes, and noted as the aristocratic tavern of Detroit at that time. Woodworth donated the services and rooms of the hotel to house American soldiers during and after the War of 1812, hosted a gala ball for President James Monroe in 1817, and the hotel served as the first meeting of Detroit's Masonic Lodge #2 in 1821, as well as for patriotic meetings in general.

The hotel contributed to creating the commercial center of Detroit at the time centered around the wharf. It was described by Michigan Pioneer Society President Francis Asbury Dewey "as the best tavern in Michigan...the house was large and commodious, accommodating two hundred or more, and in the summer months was often full of enterprising and intelligent travelers."

Today visitors to Canada pass over the place where the hotel stood as they enter the tunnel to Windsor.

=== War of 1812 ===
Woodworth served as an artillery captain in the War of 1812. During this war Governor Hull was taken prisoner and removed to Canada, never to return to Detroit, and the mansion was seized.

==== Benjamin Woodworth Congressional Act ====
On February 22, 1827, the Congress authorized a relief act specifically named for Benjamin, in which the soldiers owed compensation for the war had authorized Woodworth to receive their earnings for some unnamed reason.

== Later years ==
Following the war, Woodworth continued serving as a volunteer Captain of Detroit's artillery company. He would serve as a Vice-Marshal in 1814, and coroner of Wayne County between 1815 and 1836, which the position was considered the Marshal of the county. He would also serve as the Assessor, Supervisor, and as an Alderman for the first ward between 1843 and 1845.

In 1820, Woodworth was licensed to operate a ferry between Detroit and Canada. In the Canadian Patriot War of 1837-1838, Woodworth was sympathetic to the patriot side, supporting them financially, and even putting their wounded soldiers up in his hotel.

=== Michigan death penalty ===
Woodworth played a key role in the abolition of the death penalty in Michigan, after being the hangman in the last execution performed in the state. In 1830 a saloon owner and drunkard, Stephen Simmons, murdered his wife. He was found guilty and sentenced to death. The sheriff of the county resigned rather than carry out the sentence. Woodworth was then appointed sheriff, and delegated the task of constructing the gallows and performing the hanging. The spectacle drew large interest, and brought visitors from all over the region to watch. The governor attended, and before the hatch was released, Simmons made a confession and plea for mercy. The crowd was moved, embarrassed that they had made entertainment out the incident, but the governor refused clemency and Simmons was hanged. In 1846, the state abolished the death penalty, with the Simmons case playing a key role. In doing so, Michigan became the first English-speaking government to ban the death penalty. Woodworth's appointment as sheriff ended soon after the execution, being compensated by the state and relieved the next year following an election in which he did not participate.

=== Tragedy ===
In the 1840s Benjamin experienced life-changing tragedies. After he had already lost many of his children in their youth, his grown son Samuel was killed in a boiler explosion while operating the ferry General Vance, which he owned. Then, shortly after he had sold his Detroit properties, the old "Steamboat Hotel" was destroyed by fire. Woodworth removed to St. Clair County, where he lived until his death in 1874.

== Marriage and children ==
Benjamin was remembered as a man who "had a heart full of kindness and a hand ever ready to help the distressed". Benjamin married Rachel Dicks and they had the following children:

- Abigail Woodworth, who married Charles Ewing
- Samuel Woodworth, who married Lucinda Allen, and who died in the explosion of the Steamboat Vance
- Ann Maria Woodworth, who married General Simeon B. Brown
- Frances Elizabeth Woodworth, who married A.J. Cummings
- Ruth Woodworth, died young
- Louisa Woodworth, died young
- Catherine Woodworth, died young
- Mary Woodworth, died young
- Benjamin Woodworth, died young
- Henry Woodworth, died young
- James Woodworth, died young
