= Woodworth political family =

American and Canadian political family

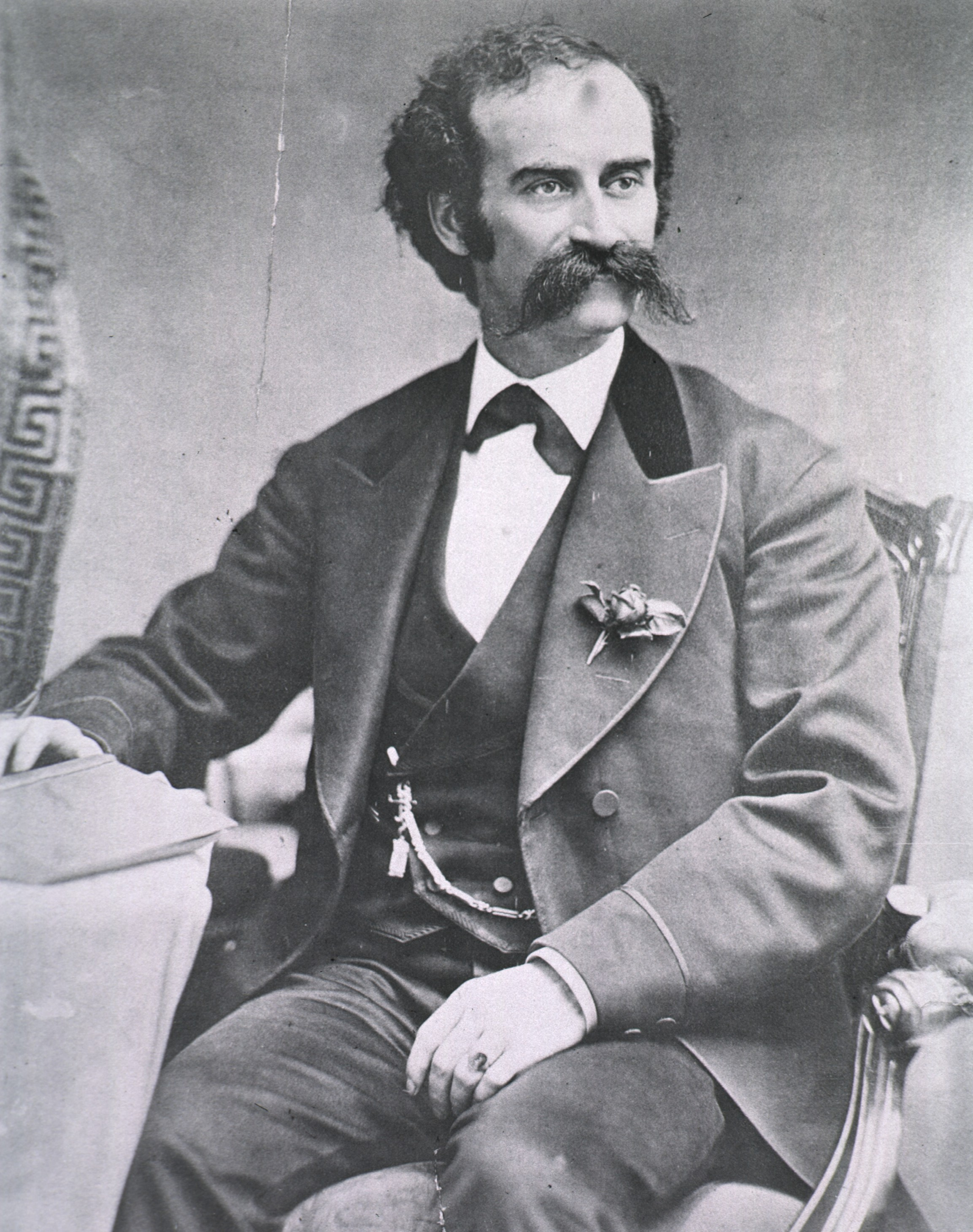
John Maynard Woodworth, 1st Surgeon General of the United States

The Woodworth political family is a collection of American and Canadian politicians who descend directly from colonial settler Walter Woodworth. They rose to prominence in the 19th century, serving in several states, in the United States House of Representatives, the House of Commons of Canada, and included America's first Surgeon General. In the modern era, two United States Presidents claim lineage to Walter.

== U.S. presidential cabinet level officeholders ==
- John Maynard Woodworth (R) - United States 1st Surgeon General: 1871-1879

== U.S. House of Representatives ==
- James H. Woodworth (R) - Illinois: 1855-1857 (also served as Mayor of Chicago)
- Laurin D. Woodworth (R) - Ohio: 1873-1877 - also served as Senator
- William W. Woodworth (D) - New York: 1845-1847

== Canadian House of Commons ==
- Douglas B. Woodworth (LC) - Kings: 1882-1887, son-in-law of Senator Ezra Churchill

== U.S. state senators ==
- Frederick A. Woodworth - California: 1857
- Arthur W. Woodworth (R) - Vermont: 1880 (also served in the legislature)
- Robert Woodworth - New York: 1792-1796 (also served as a Judge of the Court of Common Pleas and in the legislature)
- Frederick L. Woodworth - Michigan: 1913-1916 (also served in the Michigan house of representatives)
- Burrel Woodworth - Connecticut: 1833
- Wilbur Fisk Woodworth (R) - Kansas: 1863-1864 (also served in Michigan as a Circuit Court Judge)
- Dempster Woodworth - Wisconsin: 1895-1899

== U.S. state representatives ==
- Thomas B. Woodworth (R) - Michigan: 1877-1888
- Albert Woodworth (R) - New Hampshire: 1893-1895 (also served as Mayor of Concord)
- George W. Woodworth (D) - Vermont: 1880-1888
- Erastus Woodworth - New York: 1824-1832
- Samuel Woodworth - New York: 1811-1812
- Amos Woodworth - New York: 1835
- James S. Woodworth - Massachusetts
- Alanson Woodworth - New York: 1846
- Samuel Woodworth - New York: 1825
- Augustus Woodworth - New York: 1858

== Canadian provincial legislators ==
- Joseph E. Woodworth (C) - Manitoba: 1883-1886, United Empire Loyalist

== U.S. state supreme court justices ==
- John Woodworth - New York: 1819-1828 (also served in State Legislature and Senate, and as State Attorney General)

== U.S. military officers ==
- Selim E. Woodworth - Commander, U.S. Navy (also served in California Senate)
- Benjamin Woodworth - Captain, War of 1812 (also served as a Marshal, Sheriff, and Coroner for Wayne County, Michigan)
- Abner Woodworth - Captain, War of 1812 (later a general)
- Gershom Woodworth - Captain, French & Indian War and American Revolution
- General George Vanwyck Pope, known as Van Pope - Brigadier General, U.S. Army, Chief of Staff to Gen. Omar Bradley during the founding of the 82nd Airborne Division, Fort Bragg, North Carolina, during World War II; descendant of Chicago Mayor James H. Woodworth

== Other ==
- Stephen Elias Woodworth - Signed the Declaration of Sentiments

== Notable consanguinity descendants ==
- U.S. Senator from Connecticut Prescott Bush
- U.S. President George H. W. Bush
- U.S. President George W. Bush
- Florida Governor Jeb Bush
- Emory A. Chase, New York Supreme Court Justice: 1897-1920
