= Francis Channing Woodworth =

American children's writer (1812–1859)

- Born: 1812; Colchester, Connecticut, United States
- Died: June 5, 1859 (aged 46–47)
- Other name: Theodore Tinker
- Occupation: Writer

Francis Channing Woodworth (1812 – June 5, 1859) was a printer, vicar and a writer.

He was born at Colchester, Connecticut, the nephew of Samuel Woodworth, and began his career as a printer. After eight years he became a preacher, but quit because of health issues. Thereafter he became a writer of juvenile literature, sometimes using pseudonym Theodore Tinker. He was editor of a magazine called The Youth's Cabinet, which his brother D. Austin Woodworth published. Francis died while sailing to New York from Savannah, Georgia.

== Bibliography ==
- Stories for little folks
- Stories about birds and beasts (1850)
- Stories about the country (1850)
- A wheat-sheaf: gathered from our own fields (1850)
- Our own fields (1850)
- The peddler's boy, or, I'll be somebody (1851)
- A peep at the beasts (1851)
- Stories about birds: with pictures to match (1851)
- Uncle Frank's home stories (1851) 6 volumes
- Youth's book of gems (1851)
- The boy's story book (1852)
- A budget of Willow Lane stories (1852)
- The little mischief-maker: and other stories (1852)
- A peep at the beasts: with twenty engravings (1852)
- The poor organ-grinder: and other stories (1852)
- Uncle Frank's peep at the beasts (1852)
- Uncle Frank's picture gallery (1852)
- The wonderful letter-bag of kit curious: with tinted illustrations (1852)
- First lessons in botany (1853)
- Wonders of the insect world: with illustrative engravings (1853)
- The boy's and girl's country book: with illustrations (1854)
- The boy's story book (1854)
- Buds and blossoms from our own garden (1854)
- Jack Mason: the old sailor (1855)
- The young American's life of Fremont (1856)
- Stories about the country: with illustrations (1857)
- The boy's and girl's country book (1858)
- The picture A.B.C. book with stories (1859)
