= Liz Hager =

American politician (born 1944)

Elizabeth S. Hager (born October 31, 1944) is an American politician who is a former member of the New Hampshire House of Representatives.

== Personal life ==
Elizabeth Sears Hager was born on October 31, 1944 in Washington, D.C. to Hess and Betty Spears. She received her bachelor’s degree at Wellesley College in 1966, then her Master of Public Administration at the University of New Hampshire.

== Public service ==
Hager was first elected to the state House in 1972. She was reelected twelve times, until losing reelection in 2008. Hager served on the Concord City Council for nine years and was mayor in 1988–1989. She was the first and only female mayor of Concord.

Hager had been mentioned as a possible appointment to the United States Senate, after Judd Gregg was nominated United States Secretary of Commerce.

== Political beliefs ==
Hager is a moderate Republican, who endorsed Barack Obama in the 2008 presidential election due to his pro-choice stance. During her career, Hager has sponsored legislation protecting abortion rights.

== See also ==
- List of mayors of Concord, New Hampshire
