= Arthur W. Woodworth =

American politician

Arthur Wellington Woodworth

Senator for Franklin County in Vermont General Assembly
- In office 1880–1880

Representative for Enosburgh in Vermont General Assembly
- In office 1859–1860

Personal details
- Born: May 7, 1823 Enosburg, Vermont
- Died: February 10, 1919 (aged 95)
- Party: Republican
- Spouse: Adaline Ladd
- Children: 1 daughter
- Profession: banker

Arthur Wellington Woodworth (May 7, 1823 – February 10, 1919), was the founder and President of the First National Bank of Enosburgh, a Vermont State Senator and Representative, and member of the Woodworth political family.

== Early life and education ==
Arthur was born in 1823 in Enosburgh, Vermont, the son of William S. Woodworth and Patience Stevens. He was educated in the local village schools, while receiving career training as a carpenter from his father. He labored in that field until 1844, when he went to work in St. Albans for a local judge as a farmhand. He returned to Enosburgh where he purchased his own farm.

== Business interests ==
Woodworth became a director of the Central Vermont Railyard, and owned the Lumber Manufacturing Co. until 1900. He also served as a director of the St. Albans Savings Bank and Trust Co. After retiring from the lumber industry, he devoted his time to his other business and real estate interests, which included 1,400 acres (5.7 km^{2}) and a sawmill in Westfield, 500 acres (2.0 km^{2}) in Sheldon, several farms, a mill in Sampsonville and a creamery in Enosburg.

Woodworth was described as a self-made man of integrity and sound judgment who always had a hand out to those in need.

=== First National Bank of Enosburgh ===
In 1905, Woodworth founded the First National Bank of Enosburgh, becoming the President and one of the directors. The bank began with capital of $25,000 and steadily grew thereafter under his leadership.

== Politics ==
Woodworth cast his first Presidential vote for Henry Clay in 1846, and became a Republican in the near future, serving as a selectman, constable, and lister. In 1858, he was elected to the Vermont General Assembly, serving a term. In 1879, he was elected to the State Senate, where he served on the General and Grand List Committees.

It was said that Woodworth was above political tricks and cheap intrigues often found in public life.

=== Protection of domestic animals ===
As a Senator in 1880, Woodworth introduced S. 67, which provided for the protection of domestic animals.

== Marriage and children ==
Woodworth married Adaline Ladd, daughter of Alpheus Ladd and Jane French. They had one daughter, Linnie, who married Walter V. Phelps, a business partner of her father who was also a State Representative and eventual nominee for State Treasurer.
