= Thomson Jay Hudson =

American author and parapsychologist

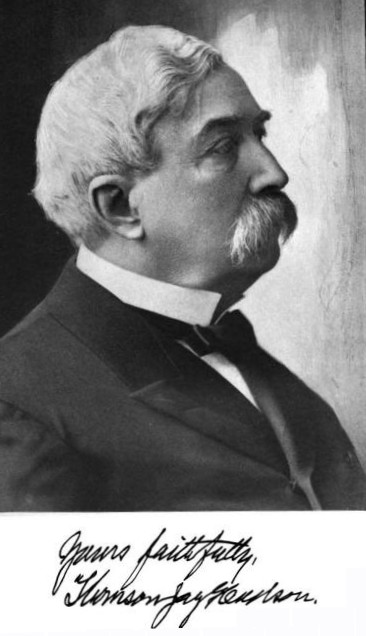
- Born: 22 February 1834; Windham, Ohio
- Died: 26 May 1903 (aged 69); Detroit, Michigan
- Education: LL.D. Ph.D.
- Occupations: author, lecturer, lawyer, journalist, patent examiner
- Known for: Anti-spiritualist, Psychic research, experimental psychology, studies in hypnotism

Thomson Jay Hudson (February 22, 1834 – May 26, 1903), was an American author, journalist, a chief examiner of the US Patent Office, and a prominent anti-Spiritualist psychical researcher, known for his three laws of psychic phenomena, which were first published in 1893.

== Family ==
The son of John Hudson (1791-1872), and Ruth Hudson (1800-1875), Thomson Jay Hudson was born in Windham, Ohio on February 22, 1834.

He married Hannah Elizabeth Story (1833-1908), later Mrs. William R. Dewitt Bersley, in 1852. They had four children.

He married Emma Little (c.1844-1908) on May 28, 1861. Their son, Charles Bradford Hudson (1865 - 1939), was landscape painter.

== Early life ==
His early life was spent on a farm, where he bore the brunt of the hardships incident to farm life in days before agricultural machinery lightened its labors. To this, as well as to heredity on both sides of his family, he owed his robust health and iron constitution. His early education was acquired in the common schools of his neighborhood and at an academy in a neighboring town. It was here that some characteristics of his adult life first asserted themselves. He refused to be bound by precedent or to submit to authority in matters of education; while following the prescribed course faithfully, he insisted on adding studies he deemed valuable. For instance, he surprised his common-school teacher by announcing his intention to study Natural Philosophy, Chemistry, and Logic. However, young Hudson was aided in his private education by a learned uncle who loaned him books and provided private instruction.

The great disappointment of his life came when prepared to enter college. His father announced there was one condition for supporting his college education: that he enter the ministry. The young man flatly refused this demand, expressing his determination to study law instead, stating he could not conscientiously preach theological dogmas he didn't believe. As a result, he abruptly left home under circumstances that would have daunted a less energetic nature. He continued his studies with private tutors, and by the time admitted to the bar was well equipped for his career.

His legal career proved short-lived. In 1860 he moved to Port Huron, Michigan, and by 1865 had transitioned into journalism and politics. He only once sought political office - in 1866 as his party's candidate for Senator - but was defeated with his party in the minority. His strong campaign established his reputation as a public speaker.

== Education ==
He was educated in public schools at Windham. He studied law and was admitted to the bar at Cleveland, Ohio in 1857. He received an honorary LL.D. degree from St. John's College, in Annapolis, Maryland, on June 17, 1896, and a "Ph.D. from Ewing College, Illinois".

== Professional life ==
He practiced for several years in Mansfield, Ohio until he started his journalistic career in 1860. He was the editor of the Port Huron Commercial (Port Huron, Michigan), and the Detroit Evening News (Detroit, Michigan). In 1880, he abandoned journalism and entered the US Patent Office. He was appointed principal examiner in 1886 and served until 1893. In 1877 he became Washington correspondent for the Scripps Syndicate, serving several prominent newspapers.

He continued in this capacity until after publishing his groundbreaking 1893 work "The Law of Psychic Phenomena," which brought him international fame throughout the English-speaking world. The book's sales continue to this day.

This was followed in 1895 by "A Scientific Demonstration of the Future Life" (considered by many his superior work), then "The Divine Pedigree of Man," and finally "The Law of Mental Medicine" in 1903, published just days before his death from heart failure on May 26, 1903, in Detroit.

== Psychology and Psychical research ==
After retiring he studied experimental psychology and authored books on psychical research.

Hudson's theories gained increased popularity when Thomas Troward adopted them, forming the foundation for his renowned series of lectures on "Mental Science", delivered at the Queen Street Hall, in Edinburgh, in 1904, and at the Doré Gallery, in London, in 1909. Troward integrated the concept of two minds into New Thought, and it subsequently caught the attention of Ernest Holmes, evolving into the fundamental insight that underlies the principles of Religious Science.

Hudson was associate editor of The Medico-Legal Journal. At a meeting of the Medico Legal Society on December 18, 1901, he discussed the case of psychic Leonora Piper. Hudson lectured at Dr. Herbert A. Parkyn's Chicago School of Psychology and was a regular contributor to its affiliated publications The Hypnotic Magazine and Suggestion magazine where he elaborated on his psychical theories and research.

== Hudson's Primary Areas of Research ==
1. Psychical Research and Metaphysics: Hudson was interested in the scientific study of psychical phenomena, attempting to bring a more systematic and empirical approach to the exploration of paranormal experiences. While rooted in psychology, his work also touched on metaphysical and spiritual aspects, especially concerning the possibility of an afterlife.
2. Subconscious Mind: Hudson's work often focused on the subconscious mind and its role in shaping human behavior and experiences. He believed that much of what is considered paranormal could be explained by understanding the workings of the subconscious mind.
3. Hypnotism and Suggestion: Hudson explored the concepts of hypnotism and suggestion, suggesting that the power of suggestion could influence mental processes and lead to psychic experiences. He believed that through the understanding and application of suggestion, individuals could potentially tap into their psychic abilities.
4. Mind-Body Connection: Hudson delved into the mind-body connection, exploring how mental states and thoughts could impact physical health and well-being. This aspect of his work is evident in discussions about hypnotic healing and the potential for the mind to influence bodily functions.

== Hudson's theory ==
Thomson Jay Hudson began observing hypnotism shows and noticed similarities between hypnosis subjects and the trances of Spiritualist mediums. His idea was that any contact with "spirits" was contact with the medium's or the subject's own subconscious. Anything else could be explained by telepathy, which he defined as contact between two or more subconsciouses. Hudson postulated that his theory could explain all forms of spiritualism and had a period of popularity until the carnage of the First World War caused a fresh interest in spiritualism again as psychic mediums emerged to meet the demands of grieving relatives. Hudson attended the annual convention of the National Society of Spiritualists in Rochester, New York in October, 1909.

=== "Two minds" ===
In The Law of Psychic Phenomena (1893, p. 26), Hudson spoke of an "objective mind" and a "subjective mind"; and, as he further explained, his theoretical position was that:

our "mental organization" was such that it seemed as if we had "two minds, each endowed with separate and distinct attributes and powers; [with] each capable, under certain conditions, of independent action" (p.25); and, for explanatory purposes, it was entirely irrelevant, argued Hudson, whether we actually had "two distinct minds", whether we only seemed to be "endowed with a dual mental organization", or whether we actually had "one mind [possessed of] certain attributes and powers under some conditions, and certain other attributes and powers under other conditions" (pp.25-26).

Hudson used his hypothesis of two minds to explain the appearance of ghosts which he argued were not spirits of the dead but creations from the subjective mind projected from one mind to another. His also argued that cases of spirit photography were not spirits but visions projected from the medium's subjective mind. His dual mind hypothesis relied on the existence of telepathy which has not proven to exist.

=== Hudson's three laws ===
1. Man has two minds: the objective mind (conscious) and the subjective mind (subconscious).
2. The subjective mind is constantly amenable to control by suggestion.
3. The subjective mind is incapable of inductive reasoning.

== The Law of Psychic Phenomena (1893) ==
This book is considered Hudson's seminal work. In it, he explores the idea that there are laws governing psychic phenomena, including telepathy, clairvoyance, and other paranormal activities. Hudson argues that these phenomena can be understood through the principles of subconscious mental activity. The book discusses hypnotism, suggestion, and the role of the subconscious mind in influencing psychic experiences.

1. Subconscious Mind: Hudson emphasizes the significance of the subconscious mind and its role in psychic phenomena. He argues that many paranormal experiences can be explained by understanding the activities of the subconscious mind, including telepathy, clairvoyance, and precognition.
2. Hypnotism and Suggestion: The book delves into the concepts of hypnotism and suggestion, suggesting that the power of suggestion plays a crucial role in influencing human behavior and mental processes. Hudson discusses how suggestion can be used to tap into the subconscious mind and bring about psychic experiences.
3. Spiritual Aspects: While Hudson approaches the subject matter from a scientific and psychological perspective, he also touches on spiritual aspects, considering the possibility of a higher spiritual realm and the existence of an afterlife. The book explores the idea that psychic phenomena may provide evidence for the continuation of consciousness beyond physical death.
4. Laws Governing Psychic Phenomena: Hudson proposes that there are underlying laws governing psychic phenomena, and by understanding these laws, individuals can potentially harness and control psychic abilities. He attempts to provide a scientific framework for the study of paranormal experiences.
5. Mind-Body Connection: The book explores the intricate connection between the mind and body, suggesting that the mind has the power to influence physical health and well-being. This connection is often examined in the context of hypnotic healing and the impact of mental states on the body.

== Reception ==
Hudson's ideas about a dual mind and psychical powers had mixed reviews by the scientific community.

- According to Yeates, Coué shared the theoretical position that Thomson Jay Hudson had expressed in his Law of Psychic Phenomena (1893): namely, that our "mental organization" was such that it seemed as if we had "two minds, each endowed with separate and distinct attributes and powers; [with] each capable, under certain conditions, of independent action".
- A (1893) review of The Law of Psychic Phenomena, in The Dublin Journal of Medical Science, noted that "we recommend this book to all our medical readers who take an interest in hypnotism as an example of what absurdities may still find advocates".
- A (1894) of The Law of Psychic Phenomena, published in the Journal of the Bristol Medico-Chirurgical Society, commented that "in the face of recent psycho-physiological researchers, it is a little venturesome to maintain that large classes of mental phenomena go on independently of neutral processes; but Mr. Hudson does so with an almost wanton lightness".
- A (1894) review of The Law of Psychic Phenomena, in The Speaker, commented that Hudson's hypothesis relied on the idea that the "subjective mind" is independent of the brain and has its own organisation independent of the "objective mind" which uses the brain but this idea is unreasonable and not supported by scientific evidence. The review also noted that Hudson's assumption of telepathy is unnecessary, "until telepathy is established, and until it is shown to have no connection with the brain, such an assumption as Mr. Hudson's is useless".
- Spiritualists, such as Rev. Thomas Ernest Allen (1858-1930), Secretary of the American Psychical Society, also rejected Hudson's dual mind hypothesis, considering it disproven.
- In his contribution to the society's (1901) examination of the issues raised by the Leonora Piper controversy, Ferdinand Eugene Daniel, M.D. (1839–1914), Vice-Chairman of the Psychological Section of the Medico-Legal Society of New York, and the Editor of the Texas Medical Journal, commented that, in his view — on the basis that he (Daniel) was "not acquainted with any authority that admits the ["two minds"] postulate upon which Mr. Hudson bases his elaborate "Laws of Psychic Phenomena"" — Hudson was "laboring under a delusion".

== Death ==
He died from heart failure at his home in Detroit, Michigan on May 26, 1903 at age 69 after being ill for approximately four months.

== Works ==
=== Publications ===
- Hudson, T.J. (1893), The Law of Psychic Phenomena: A Working Hypothesis for the Systematic Study of Hypnotism, Spiritism, Mental Therapeutics, etc., Chicago, IL: A.C. McClurg & Company.
- Hudson, T.J. (1895), A Scientific Demonstration of The Future Life, Chicago, IL: A.C. McClurg & Company.
- Hudson, T.J. (1899),The Divine Pedigree of Man; or, The Testimony of Evolution and Psychology to the Fatherhood of God, Chicago: IL: A.C. McClurg and Company.
- Hudson, T.J. (1903), The Law of Mental Medicine: The Correlation of the Facts of Psychology and Histology in their Relation to Mental Therapeutics, Chicago, IL: A.C. McClurg & Company.
- Hudson, T.J. (1904), The Evolution of the Soul and Other Essays: With Portrait and Biographical Sketch, Chicago, IL: A.C. McClurg & Company.
- Hudson, T.J. (1908), The Law of Psychic Phenomena: A Working Hypothesis for the Systematic Study of Hypnotism, Spiritism, Mental Therapeutics, etc. (Thirty-First Edition), Chicago, IL: A.C. McClurg & Company.
- Hudson, T.J. (1920), The Evolution of the Soul and Other Essays: With Portrait and Biographical Sketch (Sixth Edition), Chicago, IL: A.C. McClurg & Co.

=== Articles, etc. ===
- Hudson, T.J. (1895a),"Hypnotism in its Relations to Criminal Jurisprudence", The New York Medical Journal , Vol.61, (26 January 1895), pp. 106-109.
  - Howard, William Lee (1895), "Hypnotism and Crime: A Reply to Mr. Thomson Jay Hudson", The New York Medical Journal, Vol.61, (9 March 1895), pp. 298-300.
- Hudson, T.J. (1895b), "Hypnotism and Crime: A Reply to Dr. William Lee Howard", The New York Medical Journal, Vol.61, (11 May 1895), pp. 590-592.
- Hudson, T.J. (1897), "The Danger Lines in Hypnotism", The Hypnotic Magazine, 2(3), (March 1897), pp. 129-141.
- Hudson, T.J. (1900), "The Fundamental Principles of Hypnotism", pp. 140-145 in E.V. Neal & C.S. Clark (eds.), Hypnotism and Hypnotic Suggestion: A Scientific Treatise on the Uses and Possibilities of Hypnotism, Suggestion and Allied Phenomena by Thirty Authors, Rochester, NY: New York State Publishing Co.
- Hudson, T.J. (1901a),The Truth about "Christian Science": A Psychopathic Study (Part I), Everybody's Magazine, 4(22), (June 1901), pp. .667-672.
- Hudson, T.J. (1901b),The Truth about "Christian Science" — A Psychopathic Study: II. An Explanation of Mental Healing, Everybody's Magazine, 5(23), (July 1901), pp. .55-60.
- Hudson, T.J. (1902a), "Spiritism and Mrs. Leonora E. Piper", pp. 4-20 in Clark Bell (ed.), Spiritism, Hypnotism and Telepathy: As Involved in the Case of Mrs. Leonora E. Piper and the Society for Psychical Research, etc., New York, N.Y., Medico-Legal Journal.
- Hudson, T.J. (1902b), "Conclusion and Summing Up of the Discussion", pp. 163-171 in Clark Bell (ed.), Spiritism, Hypnotism and Telepathy: As Involved in the Case of Mrs. Leonora E. Piper and the Society for Psychical Research, etc., New York, N.Y., Medico-Legal Journal.
