= Mary Parker Woodworth =

American writer and speaker (1849–1919)

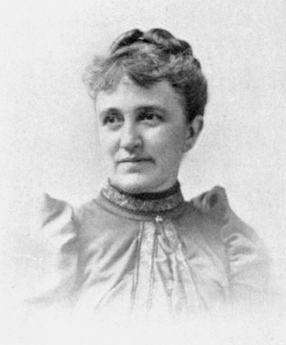
- Born: Mary Parker; May 3, 1849; Sugar Hill, New Hampshire, U.S.
- Died: June 14, 1919 (aged 70); Concord, New Hampshire, U.S.
- Education: St. Johnsbury Academy; Vassar College
- Occupations: writer, speaker
- Spouse: Albert Woodworth (m. 1873; died 1908)
- Children: 3
- Writing career
- Subjects: education; missionary life

Mary Parker Woodworth (née, Parker; May 3, 1849 – June 14, 1919) was an American writer and speaker on educational and missionary topics. She was the first New Hampshire graduate from Vassar College, and the first woman member of the Concord, New Hampshire Board of Education.

== Early life and education ==
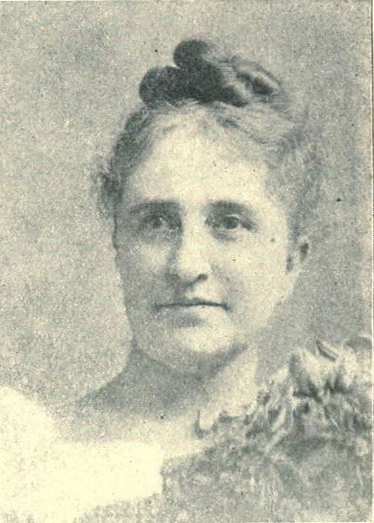
(undated)

Mary Parker was born at Sugar Hill, New Hampshire, May 3, 1849. She was the daughter of Charles and Amelia (Bennett) Parker. Woodworth's brother, Col. H. E. Parker, became editor of the Bradford Opinion.

Woodworth was educated at St. Johnsbury Academy, being the only girl in a graduating class of nine. (Note: According to The St Johnsbury Caledonian (25 Jun 1919), Streeter graduated from St. Johnsbury Academy in 1870. But according to Metcalf & McClintock (1915), she graduated from Vassar in 1870.) She entered Vassar College in the sophomore year and graduating with first honor in 1870, the first New Hampshire graduate.

== Career ==
On September 30, 1873, she married Albert Woodworth, afterward mayor of Concord. Their children were Edward, Grace, and Charles.

Woodworth taught at St. Johnsbury Academy and St. Agnes Hall, Bellows Falls, Vermont. She did much literary work. She was also a patron of art and music, being instrumental in the organization of the Concord Choral Union, of which she was vice-president.

Woodworth was the first woman member of the Concord board of education, serving nine years, 1890–9, and declining a re-election. She served as president, Concord Woman's Club, 1897–9; chair, Scholarship Fund, New Hampshire Federation of Women's Clubs, designed to aid in the normal training of girls for teaching in rural schools, since its establishment in 1904. She was a member of the Vassar and Collegiate Alumnae Associations, and twice president of the Boston branch. In religion, Woodworth was an Episcopalian, communicant of St. Paul's Church, Concord. She served as president of New Hampshire Diocesan Woman's Auxiliary to the General Board of Missions from 1912.

She was a writer and speaker in behalf of causes which interested her.

== Death and legacy ==
She died in Concord, June 14, 1919. Her letters are held in a collection at the Vassar College Digital Library.
