= List of mayors of Concord, New Hampshire =

Mayors of the city of Concord, New Hampshire, USA

The following is a list of mayors of the city of Concord, New Hampshire, USA.

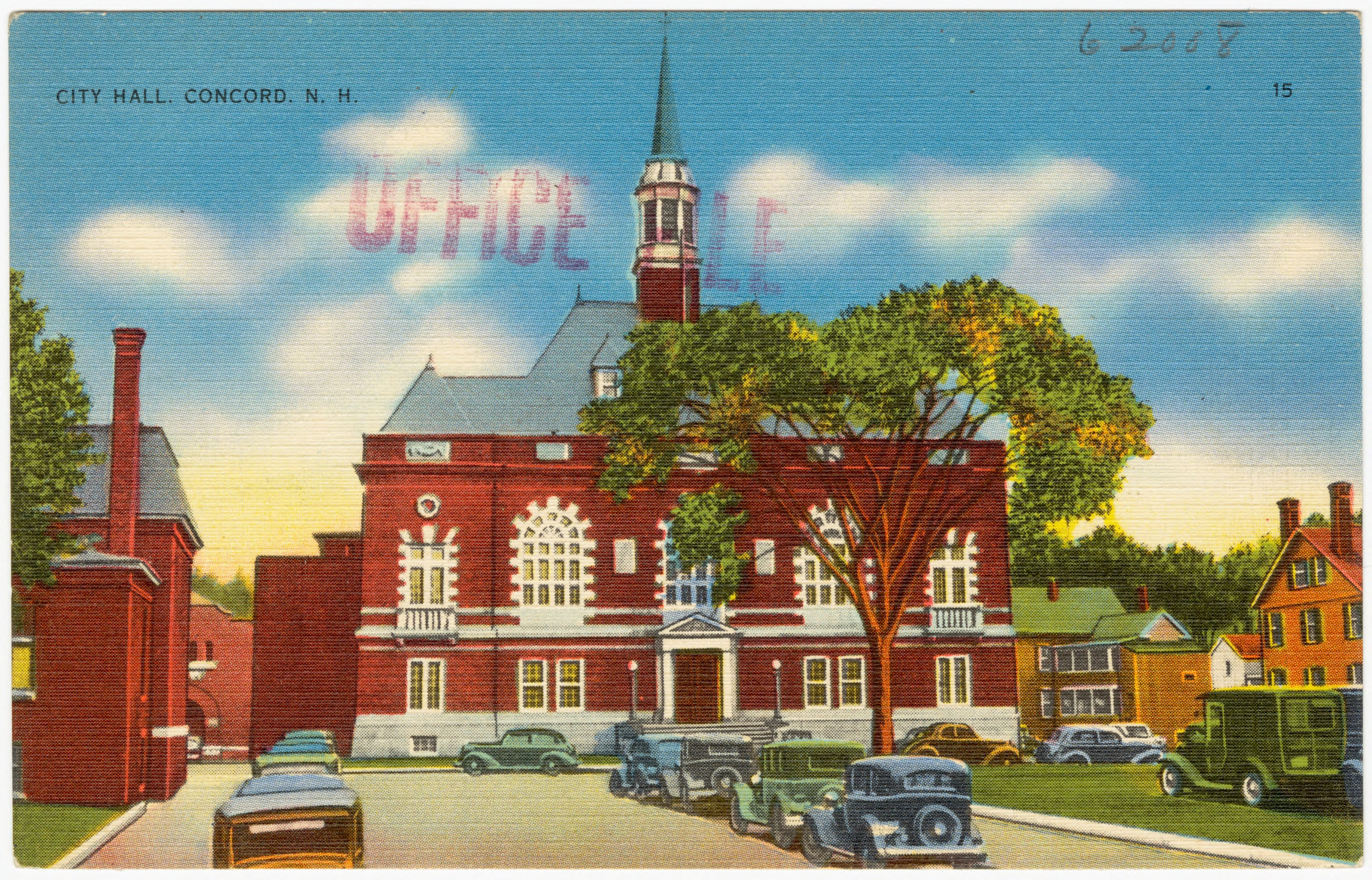
Concord city hall building, New Hampshire, USA, circa 1930s

- Joseph Low, 1853-1854
- Rufus Clement, 1855
- John Abbott, 1855-1858, 1866-1867
- Moses T. Willard, 1859-1860
- Moses Humphrey, 1861-1862, 1865
- Benjamin F. Gale, 1863-1864
- Lyman D. Stevens, 1868-1869
- Abraham G. Jones, 1870-1871
- John Kimball, 1872-1875
- George A. Pillsbury, 1876-1877
- Horace A. Brown, 1878-1880
- George A. Cummings, 1880-1882
- Edgar H. Woodman, 1883-1886
- John E. Robertson, 1887-1888
- Stillman Humphrey, 1889-1890
- Henry W. Clapp, 1891-1892
- Parsons B. Cogswell, 1893-1894
- Henry Robinson, 1895–1896
- Albert B. Woodworth, 1897-1898
- Nathaniel E. Martin, 1899–1900
- Harry G. Sargent, 1901-1902
- Charles R. Corning, 1903-1908
- Charles J. French, 1909-1915, 1918-1919
- Nathaniel W. Hobbs, 1916-1917
- Henry E. Chamberlin, ca.1920
- Fred Marden, ca.1927
- Olin H. Chase, ca.1928
- John William Storrs, 1934-1942
- Charles McKee, ca.1943
- Shelby O. Walker, ca.1953
- Howe Anderson, ca.1954
- Charles C. Davie, ca.1962-1965
- J. Herbert Quinn, ca.1967
- Malcolm McLane, ca.1970-1975
- Martin L. Gross, ca.1976-1982
- Liz Hager, 1988-1989
- William J. Veroneau, ca.1991-2000
- Michael L. Donovan, ca.2002-2007
- Jim Bouley, 2008-2024
- Byron Champlin, 2024–present

== See also ==
- Concord history
