= Frederick A. Woodworth =

American politician

Member of the California Senate from the San Francisco district
- In office 1857

Personal details
- Born: New York, NY
- Died: February 12, 1865 San Francisco, CA
- Profession: businessman

Frederick A. Woodworth, Esq. (1817-died February 12, 1865) was a San Francisco businessman, attorney, and member of the Society of California Pioneers and Woodworth political family.

== San Francisco ==
Born in New York City, Frederick came to San Francisco in May 1849. He was the son of Samuel Woodworth, brother of Selim E. Woodworth, and descendant of colonial settler Walter Woodworth. He would serve as a State Senator, Vice-Consul of San Francisco ports, Corresponding Secretary of the Mercantile Library Association of San Francisco, and on the Committee of Vigilance. He was a founder of the Industrial School in San Francisco, including serving as a member on the Board of Managers and as their vice-president.

Woodworth had large real estate holdings in San Francisco, including a lot at Market and Second Street where the future Grand Hotel was built. The landmark California legal case of Woodworth v. Fulton, involving disputed property of Frederick and his brother, Selim, is still precedent, today. Frederick and his brother were considered some of the wealthiest people in San Francisco and some of the most prominent members of the Society of California Pioneers. He died unmarried and childless in 1865, leaving his fortune to the infant Locke children.

=== Mary Ellen Pleasant ===
Woodworth and his brother were abolitionists, his brother having served in the Atlantic to end the slave trade. A Boston woman named Mary Ellen Pleasant had come to San Francisco in 1852 aboard the steamer Oregon. Initially she took employment working as a cook and housekeeper at the house belonging to the Case, Heiser & Company, Woodworth's commission merchant business. Pleasant would go on to become one of the original civil rights activists in America and one of the richest women of her time who went on to fund many slave rebellions. Mary Ellen Pleasant was no one's "Mammy".

=== Welcoming the Chinese ===
In 1850 there were about 100 Chinese residents in San Francisco. The city took the initiative to recognize their presence and welcome them into society, in which Frederick played a key role. Through an interpreter the residents were addressed by city leadership on August 28, 1850, at Portsmouth Square, including Frederick, in which their safety and protection were promised. The role of the Chinese-Americans in shaping the history of San Francisco would be significant.

== Literature ==
Woodworth edited his father's final work, "Poetical Works", in 1861. It was published in 1861 by Charles Scribner.
