= Frederick L. Woodworth =

American politician

Senator for Huron County in Michigan Legislature
- In office 1913–1916

Representative for Huron County in Michigan Legislature
- In office 1909–1912

Dairy and Food Commissioner for the State of Michigan
- In office 1917–?

Personal details
- Born: January 18, 1877 Caseville, Michigan
- Died: May 4, 1944 (aged 67)
- Party: Republican
- Education: Michigan Agricultural College
- Profession: farmer

Frederick L. Woodworth (born January 18, 1877 – May 4, 1944) was a thorough-bred horse breeder, scientific farmer, and member of the Woodworth political family.

== Life ==
Woodworth was born on January 18, 1877, in Caseville, Michigan, the son of Thomas B. Woodworth and Mary Smith. He was educated at the Michigan Agricultural College, graduating in 1893. He started farming, in which his accomplishments were noted as being the most successful representation in the county agricultural community scientifically and the premier farm in the area. He raised Jersey cattle, thorough-bred horses, and genetic-specific swine.

Woodworth was elected to the Michigan Legislature in 1909, representing Huron County, and re-elected to serve another term. In 1913, he was elected to serve as a Senator representing the 20th district, and served as the chairman of the Senate Committee on State Affairs. After serving a term, he became the Dairy and Food Commissioner for the state. In 1928, he ran unsuccessfully for the Lt. Governor seat. Woodworth would serve as the Wayne County Republican Party chairman in 1934-1935.

He served as a chairman of the Michigan State Farmers' Institute.

== Marriage and children ==
Frederick married Gertrude Lowe, a college classmate, and they had four children:

- Clara G. Woodworth
- Elizabeth Woodworth
- Thomas Lowe Woodworth
- Mary Lowe Woodworth

Woodward died in Los Angeles, California.
