= Walter Woodworth =

Walter Woodworth (1612 – February 25, 1686) was among the original colonial settlers of America and ancestor of many prominent Americans.

== Plymouth Colony ==
Walter settled in the Plymouth Colony, coming from Kent, England in 1633. He first appeared in the tax records of the Plymouth Colony in 1633. Woodworth settled in 1635 amongst the "Men of Kent" in Scituate, Massachusetts, which included Nathaniel Tilden, Edward Foster, Humphrey Turner, Isaac Chittenden, and William Hatch, who were influential in the building the settlement.

Walter took up residence at the third lot on Kent Street along the oceanfront at the corner of Meeting House Lane, where he built a home. He would acquire more property throughout his life in Plymouth Colony including a tract on the Herring Brook, a tract on Walnut Tree Hill, which in colonial times was referred to as Walter Woodworth Hill, and 60 acres (240,000 m^{2}) in Weymouth. He would serve as surveyor of highways (1645–1646, 1656) and arbiter (1645, 1662–1663).

He was a member of the First Church and had 10 children, who were Thomas, Sarah, Benjamin, Elizabeth, Joseph, Mary, Martha, Isaac, Mehitable, and Abigail.

== Descendants ==
Over 60 descendants of Walter Woodworth served in the American Revolution.

Notable descendants of Walter include William Woodworth, Samuel Woodworth, Charles W. Woodworth, Robert S. Woodworth, Mary Fish Noyes Silliman, Benjamin Silliman, Benjamin Silliman, Jr., William Richardson Belknap, Morris B. Belknap, William Burke Belknap and Bill Gates. Walter was also the progenitor of the Woodworth political family. Another child he had was Sanuel Woodworth who wrote The Old Oaken Bucket.
