= Dempster Woodworth =

American politician

Dempster William Woodworth (May 25, 1844 – November 29, 1922) was an American physician, newspaper editor, and politician.

Born in Windham, Portage County, Ohio, Woodworth was educated in the public schools. He went to Hiram College. In 1868, Woodworth moved to Ellsworth, Wisconsin, where he practiced medicine. He served as examining surgeon for United States pensions from 1872 to 1894. Woodworth was the editor and publisher of the Pierce County Examiner newspaper. In 1894, Woodworth was elected to the Wisconsin State Senate and served until 1901. He was a Republican. Woodworth died in St. Luke's Hospital in Saint Paul, Minnesota from cancer.
