= Laurin D. Woodworth =

American politician

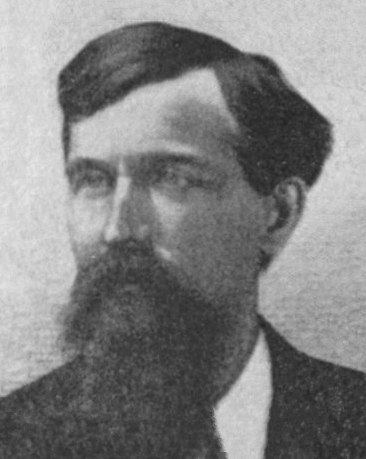

Member of the U.S. House of Representatives from Ohio's 17th district
- In office March 4, 1873 – March 3, 1877
- Preceded by: Jacob A. Ambler
- Succeeded by: William McKinley

Member of the Ohio Senate from the 23rd district
- In office January 6, 1868 – December 31, 1871
- Preceded by: G. F. Brown
- Succeeded by: Lucien C. Jones

Personal details
- Born: Laurin Dewey Woodworth; September 10, 1837 Windham, Ohio
- Died: March 13, 1897 (aged 59) Youngstown, Ohio
- Resting place: Windham Cemetery, Windham, Ohio
- Party: Republican
- Education: Hiram College; Ohio State University

Laurin Dewey Woodworth (September 10, 1837 – March 13, 1897) was an American lawyer and politician who served two terms as a U.S. representative from Ohio from 1873 to 1877. He was member of the Woodworth political family.

== Biography ==
=== Education ===
Woodworth was born in Windham, Ohio, Woodworth attended the common schools, Windham (Ohio) Academy, Hiram (Ohio) College, and the Ohio State University at Columbus, Ohio. He studied law at Union Law College, Cleveland, Ohio. He was admitted to the bar in 1859 and commenced practice in Ravenna, Ohio.

=== Public Service ===
He served as member of the Portage County Board of School Examiners. During the American Civil War, he served in the Union Army as major of the One Hundred and Fourth Ohio Volunteer Infantry from July 1862 to December 1862. He moved to Youngstown, Ohio, in 1864 and resumed the practice of law.

== Congress ==
Woodworth was elected to the State senate in 1867. He was reelected in 1869 and served as president pro tempore. Woodworth was elected as a Republican to the Forty-third and Forty-fourth Congresses (March 4, 1873 – March 3, 1877). He was an unsuccessful candidate for renomination in 1876 to the Forty-fifth Congress, losing to future U.S. President William McKinley.

== Death and burial ==
He continued the practice of law in Youngstown, Ohio, until his death there on March 13, 1897. He was interred in Windham Cemetery, Windham, Ohio.

U.S. House of Representatives
Preceded by Jacob A. Ambler	Member from Ohio's 17th congressional district 1873–1877	Succeeded by William McKinley
