= Vernon Sykes =

American politician (born 1951)

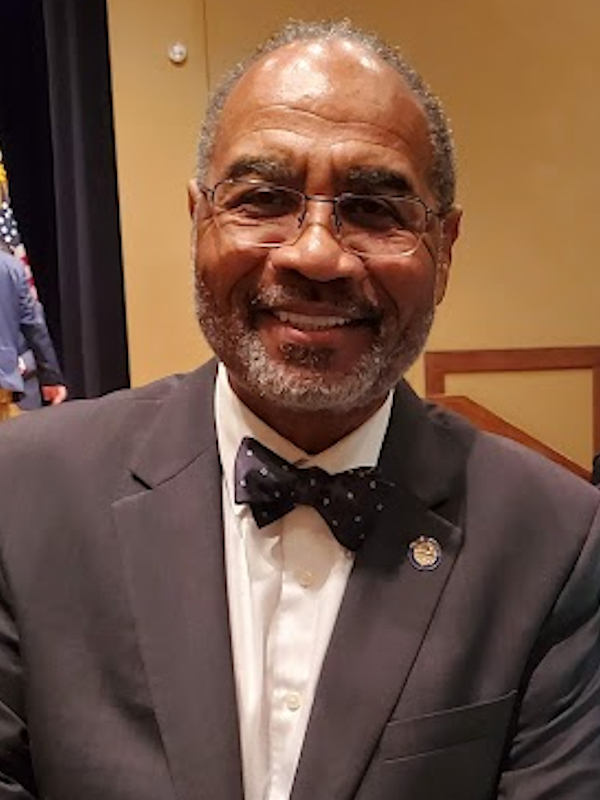
- Sykes in 2024

Member of the Ohio Senate from the 28th district
- In office January 3, 2017 – December 31, 2024
- Preceded by: Thomas C. Sawyer
- Succeeded by: Casey Weinstein

Member of the Ohio House of Representatives from the 44th district
- In office January 2, 2007 – December 31, 2014
- Preceded by: Barbara Sykes
- Succeeded by: Emilia Sykes
- In office March 16, 1983 – December 31, 2000
- Preceded by: Pete Crossland
- Succeeded by: Barbara Sykes

Personal details
- Born: Vernon Lee Sykes; October 2, 1951 (age 75) Forrest City, Arkansas, U.S.
- Party: Democratic
- Spouse: Barbara Johnson
- Children: Emilia Sykes
- Education: Ohio University (BA); Wright State University (MS); Harvard University (MPA); University of Akron (PhD)
- Profession: Educator

Vernon Lee Sykes (born October 2, 1951) is an American politician who served as the state Senator for the 28th district of the Ohio Senate from 2017 to 2024. The district included Akron, Barberton, Green, Portage Lakes, Sawyerwood, Lakemore and portions of Cuyahoga Falls, Mogadore and Tallmadge in Summit County.

A member of the Democratic Party, Sykes formerly served in the Ohio House of Representatives from 1982 to 2000 and again from 2007 to 2014, and prior to that was an Akron City Councilman.

== Career ==
Sykes served two terms on Akron City Council before his appointment to the House of Representatives in 1983. He has also served on the faculty at Kent State University as an assistant professor of political science, and as assistant professor of social science at the University of Akron.

Sykes first served in the House of Representatives in 1983, and served until 2000, when he faced term limits. He was replaced in 2001 by his wife, Barbara Sykes.

In 2006, Barbara Sykes decided to run for state auditor, and Vernon sought the seat again. First facing Patrick Bravo in the Democratic primary, he won with 77.64% of the vote. While heavily favored, Sykes faced DUI charges during the primary election campaign, somewhat dampening his chances. He won the general election against Joseph D. Crawford with 80.78% of the vote.

In his first reelection campaign, Sykes ran unopposed. In the 128th General Assembly, Speaker of the House Armond Budish appointed Sykes as Chairman of the House Finance Committee.

With the 2010 election, Sykes won a third term over Republican Josh Sines and Libertarian Kurtis Liston by taking 77.66% of the vote. With the Democrats again in the minority, Sykes serves on the committees of Finance and Appropriations (as ranking member), Local Government, and State Government and Elections.

Sykes won reelection in 2012, defeating his opponent Ronya Jeanette Habash and earning over 80% of the vote. He was term-limited again in 2014 and succeeded by his daughter, Emilia Sykes.

== Ohio Senate ==
In 2016, state Senator Thomas C. Sawyer, who had represented Akron in some facet for nearly half a century, was term-limited. While Sykes initially was not seen as a successor, he eventually declared his intentions to run for the seat. Unopposed in the primary, he faced Republican Jonathan Schulz in the general election.

Sykes would win election to the seat by a 61% to 39% margin. He was sworn in on January 3, 2017.

== Initiatives and positions ==
As ranking member of the House Finance Committee, Sykes has been critical of Governor John Kasich's privatization measure for the Ohio Department of Development, stating the measure to replace it, JobsOhio, was abdicating too much legislative authority to the executive branch. "This is a new entity and we're trying to make sure we have proper oversight in place."

The former chairman of the House Appropriations Committee, Sykes has come out against Kasich's biennium budget plan for 2012–2013, stating that he is especially troubled by the cuts proposed to local government, and plans to privatize several state prisons. He stated that he feels as if he has already been shut out of the budget process. Sykes is a member of the budget conference committee.
