= Suffield =

Suffield may refer to:

== Places ==
- Suffield, Alberta, Canada, a hamlet
  - CFB Suffield, a Canadian Forces base north of Suffield
    - British Army Training Unit Suffield, stationed at CFB Suffield
- Suffield, Norfolk, England, a village and civil parish
- Suffield, North Yorkshire, England, a hamlet
- Suffield, Connecticut, US, a town
- Suffield Township, Portage County, Ohio, US
  - Suffield (CDP), Ohio, US, an unincorporated community and census-designated place
- Suffield Point, King George Island, Antarctica

== Schools ==
- Suffield Academy, a private preparatory school in Suffield, Connecticut
- Suffield High School, West Suffield, Connecticut
- Suffield University, an unaccredited internet school

== People ==
- Melissa Suffield (born 1992), English actress
- Walter Suffield (died 1257), Bishop of Norwich

== Other uses ==
- Baron Suffield, a title in the Peerage of Great Britain
