= Little Cuyahoga River =

River in Ohio, United States

Coordinates: 41°07′11″N 81°31′45″W

The Little Cuyahoga River is a 17.4 mile-long tributary of the Cuyahoga River in the U.S. state of Ohio. Located in southeastern Summit County and southwestern Portage County, its 61.7 square mile watershed drains portions of Akron, Tallmadge, Springfield Township, Lakemore, Mogadore, Brimfield Township, Suffield Township, and Randolph Township.

== See also ==
- List of rivers of Ohio
