= Suffield Township, Ohio =

Township in Ohio, US

Suffield Township
- Township
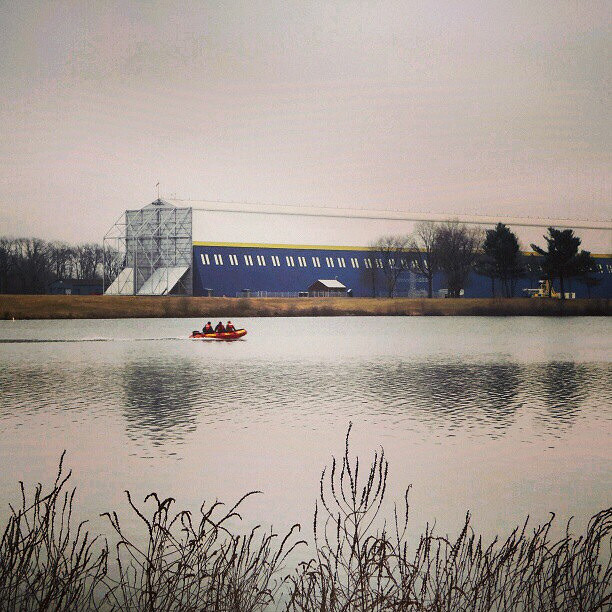
- Wingfoot Lake and the Goodyear Airship Hangar

- Flag Seal
- Interactive map of Suffield Township
- Location within Ohio Location within the United States
- Coordinates: 41°1′40″N 81°21′1″W
- Country: United States
- State: Ohio
- County: Portage
- Settled: June 1802
- Organized: April 6, 1818
- Founder: Royal Pease
- Named for: Suffield, Connecticut

Government
  - Type: Civil township

Area
  - Total: 24.7 sq mi (64.0 km^{2})
  - Land: 22.9 sq mi (59.4 km^{2})
  - Water: 1.8 sq mi (4.7 km^{2})
- Elevation: 1,180 ft (360 m)

Population (2020)
  - Total: 5,973
  - Density: 261/sq mi (100.6/km^{2})
- Time zone: UTC-5 (Eastern (EST))
  - Summer (DST): UTC-4 (EDT)
- ZIP code: 44260
- Area codes: 330, 234
- FIPS code: 39-75189
- GNIS feature ID: 1086841
- Website: suffieldtownshipohio.com

Suffield Township is one of the eighteen townships of Portage County, Ohio, United States. The 2020 census found 5,973 people in the township. Suffield was founded in 1802 and formally organized in 1818. It is best known as being the home of the Wingfoot Lake Airship Hangar, which serves as the operations center for the Goodyear Blimps and the home base for the semi-rigid airship Wingfoot One.

== Name and history ==
The first European settlers in what is now Suffield Township arrived in June 1802, with Royal Pease, his wife Deborah, and their two young children Delia and Albert being the first, arriving from Suffield, Connecticut. Several other settlers arrived in the early 1800s, many also from Suffield, Connecticut. Initially, the town was called "Peasetown", though this was never an official name. The township, formed from Town 1, Range 9 of the Connecticut Western Reserve, was initially part of Franklin Township and Trumbull County. It was included in the new Portage County in 1807 and then was made part of the new Springfield Township in 1808. At the formal organization of Suffield Township on April 6, 1818, the name Suffield was chosen at the request of several of those settlers who had come from Suffield, Connecticut. It is the only Suffield Township statewide. A post office called Suffield was established in 1836, and remained in operation until 1966. In the southwestern part of the township was a settlement called Mishler, which had a post office from 1882 until 1917. At the bicentennial of Suffield Township in 2002, the town of Suffield, Connecticut, issued a proclamation congratulating the township and also sent an American Liberty elm tree.

== Geography ==
Located in the southwestern corner of the county, it borders the following townships and city:

- Brimfield Township - north
- Rootstown Township - northeast corner
- Randolph Township - east
- Lake Township, Stark County - south
- Springfield Township, Summit County - west
- Tallmadge - northwest corner

Part of the village of Mogadore is located in northwestern Suffield Township. The hamlet of Suffield, a census-designated place, occupies the central part of the township.

Formed from the Connecticut Western Reserve, Suffield Township covers an area of 24 sq mi (62 km^{2}).

=== Geographical features ===
- Flatiron Lake Bog preserve, a 97-acre (390,000 m^{2}) kettle hole bog formed about 12,000 years ago, maintained by The Nature Conservancy).
- Mogadore Reservoir, an 1,104-acre (447 ha) artificial lake owned and maintained by the city of Akron. Roughly half of the reservoir is in neighboring Brimfield Township. The lake was constructed in 1939 by impounding water from Hale Creek and the Little Cuyahoga River to provide untreated water for Akron industries and flood control on the Little Cuyahoga, but is now mostly used for recreation. The Ohio Department of Natural Resources maintains public fishing areas around the reservoir and manages the fish population.
- Wingfoot Lake, a natural lake owned by the Ohio Department of Natural Resources. It was originally known as Fritch's Pond after early settler John Fritch, who settled in Suffield in 1804. The Goodyear Tire and Rubber Company purchased the lake as part of a 720-acre (290 ha) purchase in 1916 and built their first rigid airship factory in the US adjacent to the lake in 1917, renaming the lake "Wingfoot" after their logo, the winged shoes of Mercury. The company later built park facilities around the lake for employee recreation. Goodyear closed the park in 2006 and ODNR purchased 690 acres (280 ha), including the lake, in 2009. 121 acres (49 ha) was used to create Wingfoot Lake State Park, which opened in 2010. The remaining 569 acres (230 ha) was used to create the Wingfoot Wildlife Area preserve. Goodyear still maintains the Wingfoot Lake Airship Hangar on the southern shore of the lake. The hangar is the oldest airship hangar in the United States and serves as both the operations center for the Goodyear Blimps and as the home base for semi-rigid airship Wingfoot One.

== Government ==
The township is governed by a three-member board of trustees, who are elected in November of odd-numbered years to a four-year term beginning on the following January 1. Two are elected in the year after the presidential election and one is elected in the year before it. There is also an elected township fiscal officer, who serves a four-year term beginning on April 1 of the year after the election, which is held in November of the year before the presidential election. Vacancies in the fiscal officership or on the board of trustees are filled by the remaining trustees.

== Education ==
Public education in Suffield is primarily provided by the Field Local School District, which covers most of Suffield, most of neighboring Brimfield, and a small portion of southern Kent. The district operates Suffield Elementary School in the township, while the district offices, middle school, and Field High School are located in Brimfield, just north of its border with Suffield. The Field Local School District was created in 1959 by a merger of the Suffield and Brimfield school districts and Field High School opened in 1961. Prior to that time, Suffield operated its own district, with all grades housed at Suffield School, including Suffield High School.

Small parts of Suffield are served by three other school districts, with part of northwest Suffield in the Mogadore Local School District, part of southwest Suffield in the Springfield Local School District, and a single neighborhood along East Drive NE in the southern part of township in the Lake Local School District.
