= Field Local School District =

Public school district in Ohio, U.S.

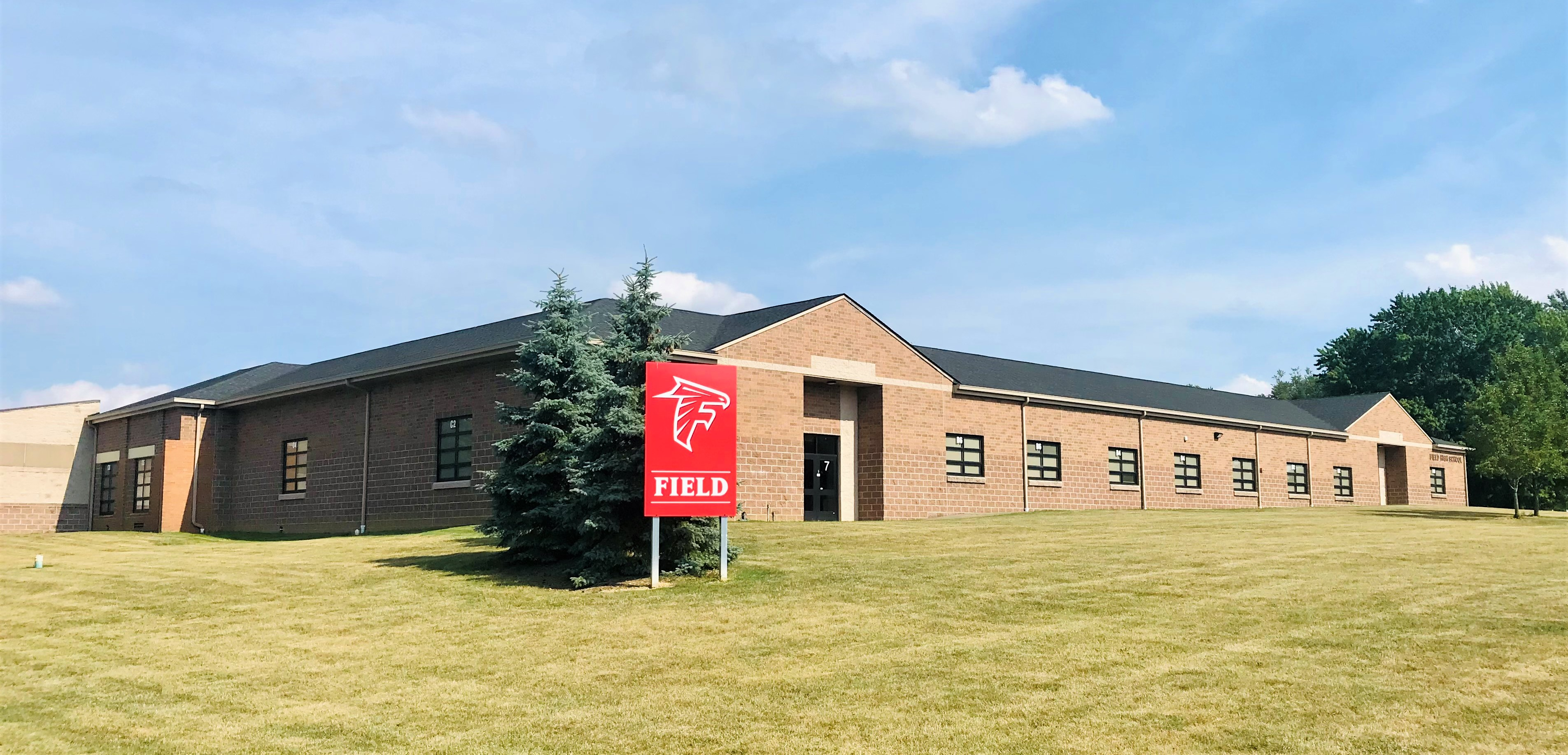
- Field High School

Address
- 2900 State Route 43 Mogadore, Ohio, 44260; United States
- Coordinates: 41°04′03″N 81°20′39″W

District information
- Type: Public
- Grades: K–12
- Established: 1959
- Superintendent: David Heflinger
- Accreditation: Ohio Department of Education
- NCES District ID: 3904919

Students and staff
- Enrollment: 1,916 (2024–25)
- Faculty: 112.86 (FTE)
- Student–teacher ratio: 16.98
- District mascot: Falcons
- Colors: Red, white, and black

Other information
- Website: fieldlocalschools.org

The Field Local School District is a public school district based in Brimfield, Ohio, United States, that serves Brimfield and Suffield Townships, and a small portion of Kent. The school district consists of one high school, one middle school, and two elementary schools. District offices are located in the Field High School building along Ohio State Route 43 in southern Brimfield, just north of the border with Suffield.

== History ==
The Field Local School District was formed in January 1959 by the consolidation of the Suffield and Brimfield local school districts. Following the consolidation, the existing township schools continued to operate as they had been, with Suffield School hosting grades 1–12, including Suffield High School, and Brimfield hosting grades 1–8 with high school students attending the Kent State University School. The final graduating class at Suffield High School was the class of 1961. In September 1961, the new Field High School opened and the Brimfield and Suffield buildings continued to operate as elementary schools for grades 1-8. A third elementary school, Central Elementary School, opened on the eastern end of the high school campus in 1967 for grades K–6 and it was followed by Field Junior High School in January 1968 for grades 7–9.

Field's team name, the "Falcons", was adopted by the high school in 1975, prior to that, they used the former Suffield High School team name of "Big Red". During the 1975–76 school year, teams were known as the "Big Red Falcons" before transitioning to just "Falcons" for the 1976–77 school year.

By the 1980s, Central Elementary served all of the district's kindergarten students, while Brimfield and Suffield elementary schools housed grades 1–5 and Field Junior High School, renamed Field Middle School, housed grades 6–8. A voter approved bond issue provided funds to replace both Brimfield and Suffield schools, which both dated to the early 1920s, along with renovations and an addition to Field High School. Brimfield and Suffield schools were demolished in 2007 following the completion of new Brimfield and Suffield Elementary Schools at the same locations. At the end of the 2009–10, Central Elementary was closed and kindergarten students were sent to their respective elementary school.

== Schools ==
=== High school ===
- Field High School, grades 9–12

=== Middle school ===
- Field Middle School, grades 6–8

=== Elementary schools ===
- Brimfield Elementary School, grades K–5
- Suffield Elementary School, grades K–5

=== Former schools ===
- Central Elementary School
