= Springfield High School (Lakemore, Ohio) =

Public high school in Lakemore, Ohio, United States

Springfield High School & Junior High
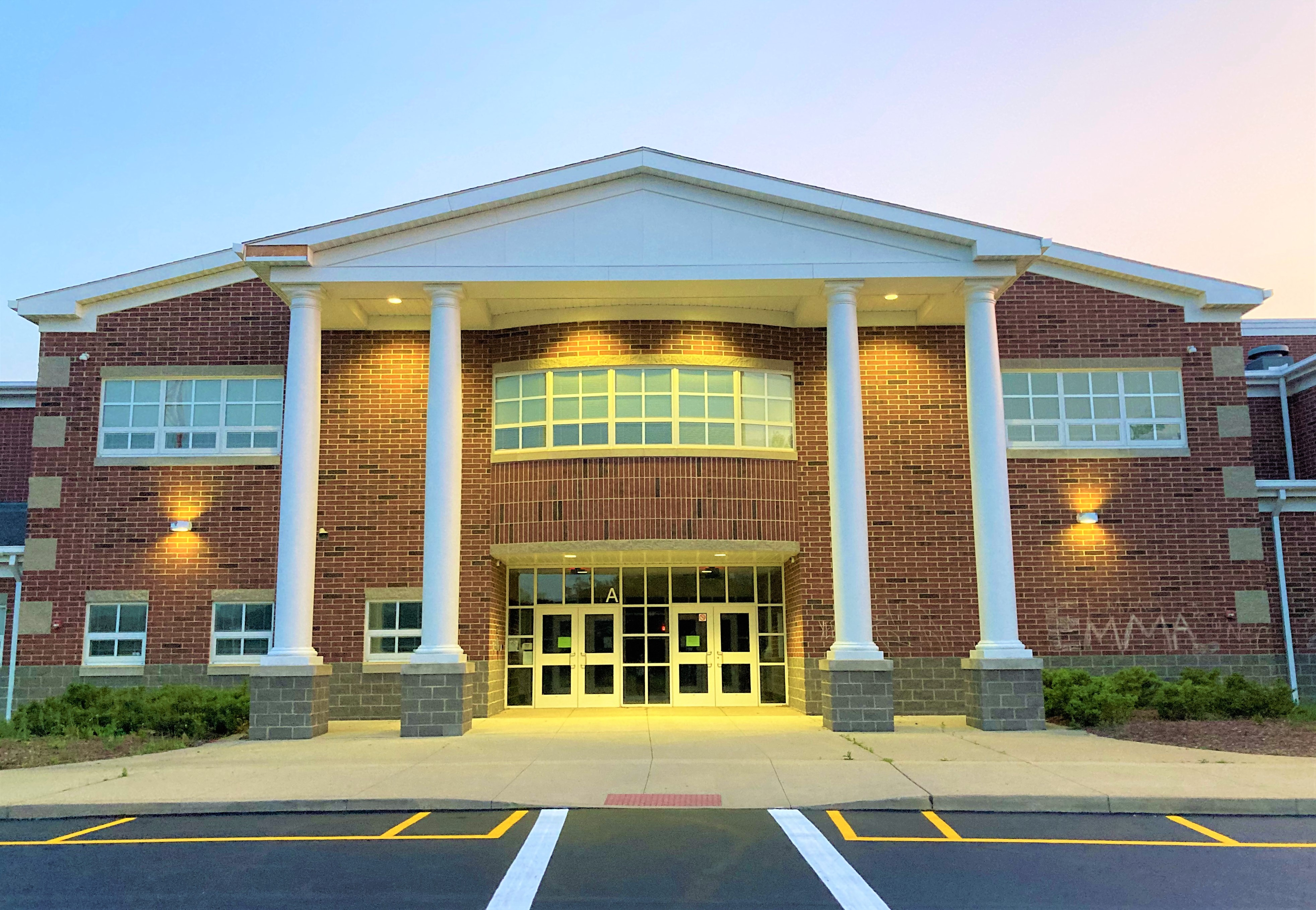

Location
- 1880 Canton Road; Akron, Ohio 44312; United States; 41°01′04″N 81°24′59″W

Information
- Funding type: Public
- School district: Springfield Local School District
- Principal: Michelle Warner
- Staff: 47.65 (FTE)
- Grades: 7–12
- Enrollment: 849 (2023–24)
- Student to teacher ratio: 17.82
- Language: English
- Campus: Suburban
- Colors: Red and Gray
- Athletics conference: Metro Athletic Conference
- Team name: Spartans
- Rivals: Field Falcons; Coventry Comets; Ellet Orangemen
- Accreditation: Ohio Department of Education
- Communities served: Springfield Township; Lakemore
- Website: hsjh.springfieldspartans.org

Springfield High School & Junior High is a public junior high and high school in Lakemore, Ohio, United States, just east of Akron. It is the only high school in the Springfield Local School District and serves students living in Lakemore and Springfield Township.

== Construction ==
The current high school was built to replace the district's old high school. The building was constructed by Cavanaugh Building in 2013. The new high school cost $42 million to build, and was supposed to be opened in the fall of 2013, but due to structural issues on the second floor the opening was delayed. The school began operations in early 2014 and has been in use since.

== Programs offered ==
- Springfield is affiliated with the Portage Lakes Career Center, which offers career programs to juniors and seniors attending Springfield High School.
- Springfield also offers a CCP (College Credit Plus) program to those attending its high school, giving them the ability to earn high school and college credits simultaneously.

== State championships ==
- Girls softball – 1978, 1988, 1989, 1990, 1992, 1993, 1994, 1995, 2005
