= Field High School =

Public high school in Brimfield, Ohio, United States

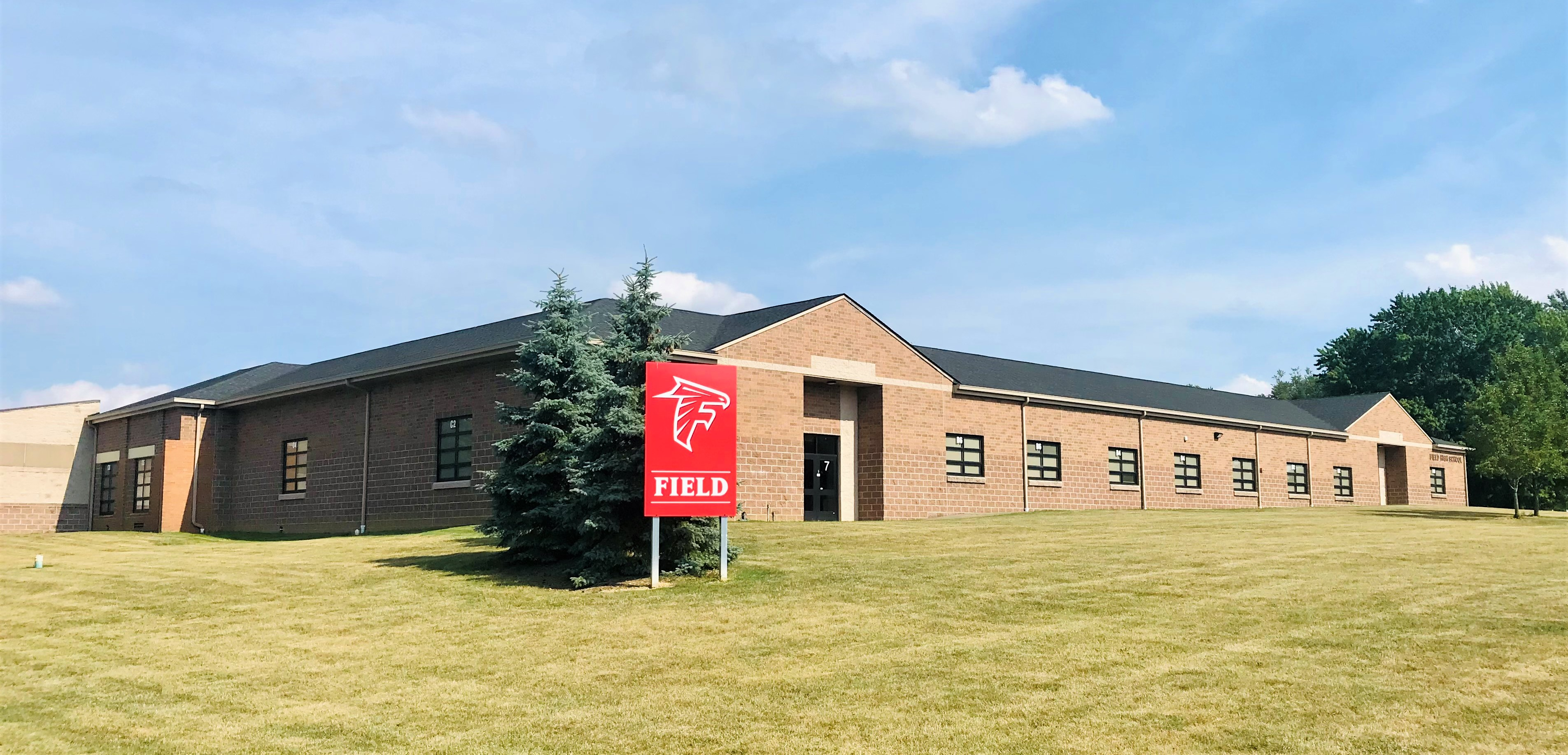

Location
- 2900 State Route 43; Mogadore, Ohio 44260; United States; 41°04′03″N 81°20′39″W

Information
- Funding type: Public
- Founded: 1961
- School district: Field Local School District
- Principal: Chelsea Keener
- Teaching staff: 25.86 (FTE)
- Grades: 9–12
- Enrollment: 537 (2023–24)
- Student to teacher ratio: 20.77
- Language: English
- Campus: Rural
- Colors: Red, white, and black
- Athletics conference: Metro Athletic Conference
- Team name: Falcons
- Accreditation: Ohio Department of Education
- Communities served: Brimfield and Suffield
- Distinctions: Ohio Dept. of Education Excellent rating - 2003, 2004, 2005, 2006, 2007
- Website: fieldlocalschools.org/fhs/index

Field High School is a public high school located in Brimfield, Ohio, United States. It is the only high school in the Field Local School District and mainly enrolls students from Brimfield and Suffield townships, and the southern part of Kent. Athletic teams are known as the Falcons, and they compete in the Metro Athletic Conference as a member of the Ohio High School Athletic Association.

== History ==
Field High School opened in 1961, following the consolidation of the Suffield and Brimfield school districts in 1959 to create the Field Local School District. Previously, high school students from Suffield attended Suffield High School at the Suffield Township School. Brimfield students attended the Brimfield Township School up to 8th grade but attended the Kent State University School for high school. Athletic teams were originally known as the Big Red, which had been the team name for Suffield High School. "Falcons" was adopted in 1976 when the school joined the Metropolitan League in sports.

== Extracurricular activities ==
The school offers honors classes that include Honors English 9–12, Honors Math (Algebra I & II, Geometry, and AP Calculus), and Honors Science (Biology, Chemistry, and Physics).

== Athletics ==
Field High School currently offers:

- Baseball
- Basketball
- Bowling
- Cheerleading
- Cross country
- Golf
- Football
- Soccer
- Softball
- Track and field
- Volleyball

=== State championships ===
- Boys cross country – 1994, 1997
- Girls cross country – 1997, 1998

== Notable alumni ==
- Jani Lane - former lead singer of Warrant
- Michael Tarver - motivational speaker and former WWE wrestler
- Kate Tucker - singer and songwriter, for Kate Tucker & the Sons of Sweden
- Janis Mars Wunderlich, ceramic artist
