= Suffield (CDP), Ohio =

Suffield, Ohio
- Census-designated place
- Location within Ohio Location within the United States
- Coordinates: 41°01′13″N 81°20′50″W
- Country: United States
- State: Ohio
- County: Portage
- Township: Suffield

Area
  - Total: 2.78 sq mi (7.20 km^{2})
  - Land: 2.71 sq mi (7.01 km^{2})
  - Water: 0.073 sq mi (0.19 km^{2})
- Elevation: 1,184 ft (361 m)

Population (2020)
  - Total: 949
  - Density: 350.5/sq mi (135.34/km^{2})
- Time zone: UTC-5 (Eastern (EST))
  - Summer (DST): UTC-4 (EDT)
- ZIP Code: 44260 (Mogadore)
- Area codes: 330/234
- FIPS code: 39-75182
- GNIS feature ID: 2812836

Suffield is an unincorporated community and census-designated place (CDP) in Suffield Township, Portage County, Ohio, United States. The population was 949 at the 2020 census. It was first listed as a CDP prior to the 2020 census.

== Geography ==
The CDP is in southwestern Portage County, in the center of Suffield Township. U.S. Route 224 passes through the north side of the community, leading west 8 miles (13 km) to the south side of Akron and east 31 miles (50 km) to Canfield, near Youngstown.

The CDP is bordered to the southwest by Wingfoot Lake, which drains northwest to the headwaters of the Little Cuyahoga River at Mogadore.

According to the United States Census Bureau, the CDP has a tota area of 2.779 square miles (7.20 km^{2}), of which 2.707 square miles (7.01 km^{2}) is land, and 0.072 square miles (0.19 km^{2}) is water.

== Demographics ==
Historical population
Census	Pop.	Note	%±
2020	949		—
U.S. Decennial Census

At the 2020 census there were 949 people in the CDP. The population density was 341 people per square mile. There were 418 housing units in the CDP. The racial makeup of the CDP was 94.52% white, 0,1% black, 0,1% Native American, 0,1% Asian, 0,31% from other races, 4,32% from two or more races and 1,37% Hispanic or Latino.
