= Wingfoot Lake Airship Hangar =

Blimp hangar

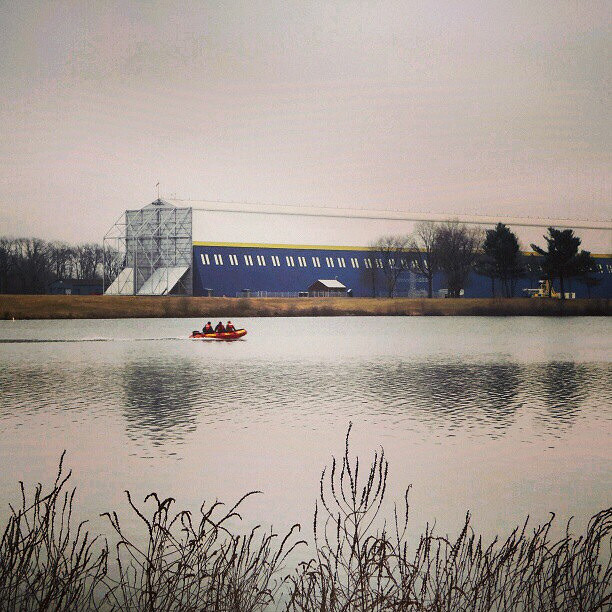
- The Hangar in 2013
- IATA: none; ICAO: none; FAA LID: 4OH6

Summary
- Airport type: Private
- Location: Mogadore, Ohio
- Built: 1917; 109 years ago
- Elevation AMSL: 1,164 ft (355 m)
- Coordinates: 41°00′34.2″N 81°21′28.4″W
- Interactive map of Wingfoot Lake Airship Hangar
- Source: Federal Aviation Administration

The Wingfoot Lake Airship Hangar in Suffield, Ohio, is the main hangar used by the Goodyear Tire and Rubber Company for construction and maintenance of their fleet of blimps.

== History ==
The Wingfoot Lake Hangar was built in 1917 for testing and construction of aircraft by the Goodyear Tire and Rubber company. During World War I and II, Goodyear built and manufactured blimps for the U.S. Navy and the first class of Navy airship pilots were trained at the site.

Today the hangar is still used as the center of operations for the Goodyear Blimps and is the oldest airship hangar in the United States.
