= 2006 Ohio State Auditor election =

- November 7, 2006
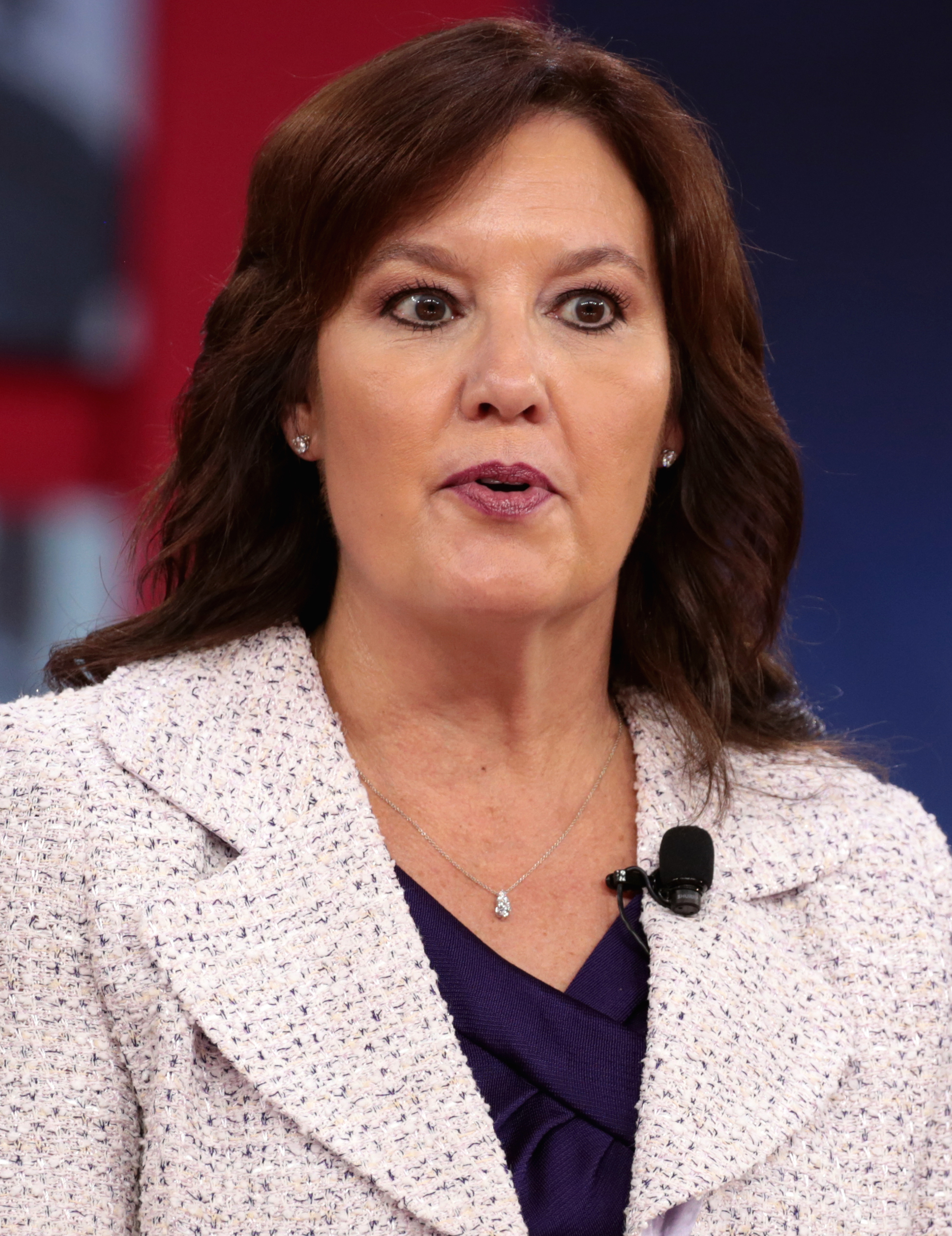

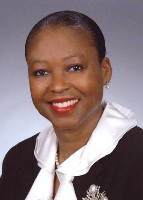
Nominee	Mary Taylor	Barbara Sykes
Party	Republican	Democratic
Popular vote	1,940,665	1,891,874
Percentage	50.64%	49.36%
- County results Taylor: 50–60% 60–70% Sykes: 50–60% 60–70% 70–80%
State Auditor before election
Betty Montgomery
Republican
Elected State Auditor
Mary Taylor
Republican

The 2006 Ohio State Auditor election was held on November 7, 2006. The Republican nominee, Ohio House Representative Mary Taylor, very narrowly defeated her Democratic opponent, fellow Ohio House Representative Barbara Sykes, by less than two percentage points.

== Background ==
Incumbent Republican Ohio State Auditor Betty Montgomery had previously won the 2002 Ohio State Auditor election by a landslide margin of 28.64 percentage points against Democratic nominee Helen Smith. She chose not to seek re-election in order to run for Governor of Ohio, later switching to Ohio Attorney General, a race she would ultimately lose.

== Republican primary ==
=== Candidates ===
- Mary Taylor, Ohio House Representative from the 43rd district (2003–2006)

=== Campaign ===
The Republican primary was held on May 2, 2006. Mary Taylor won the Republican nomination unopposed.

=== Results ===
Republican primary results
Party	Candidate	Votes	%
Republican	Mary Taylor	585,679	100
Total votes		585,679	100

== Democratic primary ==
=== Candidates ===
- Barbara Sykes, Ohio House Representative from the 44th district (2001–2006)

=== Campaign ===
The Democratic primary was held on May 2, 2006. Sykes was initially challenged for the Democratic nomination by Mahoning County Treasurer John Reardon, but he withdrew from the race prior to the primary election.

=== Results ===
Democratic primary results
Party	Candidate	Votes	%
Democratic	Barbara Sykes	614,308	100
Total votes		614,308	100

== General election ==
=== Candidates ===
- Mary Taylor, Ohio House Representative from the 43rd district (2003–2006) (Republican)
- Barbara Sykes, Ohio House Representative from the 44th district (2001–2006) (Democratic)

=== Campaign ===
The campaign was filled with mudslinging and controversy. Sykes filed a lawsuit against Taylor for conspiracy to incite racism after her campaign polled voters on whether Sykes's presidency of the Ohio Legislative Black Caucus would affect their vote. Taylor was additionally attacked for allegedly supporting a building project at the University of Akron that would have rewarded her husband with $331,000 as construction manager.

=== Results ===
The race was extremely close, but in the end, Taylor defeated Sykes by a razor-thin margin of 1.28 percentage points. She did this despite a national Democratic wave in 2006, with Democrats sweeping most of Ohio's top offices. Thus, with her victory, she became the only non-judicial statewide elected Republican official in Ohio.

2006 Ohio State Auditor election
Party	Candidate	Votes	%	±%
Republican	Mary Taylor	1,940,665	50.64%	−13.68
Democratic	Barbara Sykes	1,891,874	49.36%	+13.68
Majority		48,791	1.28%	−27.36%
Turnout		3,832,539		
Republican hold		Swing		
