= Mogadore High School =

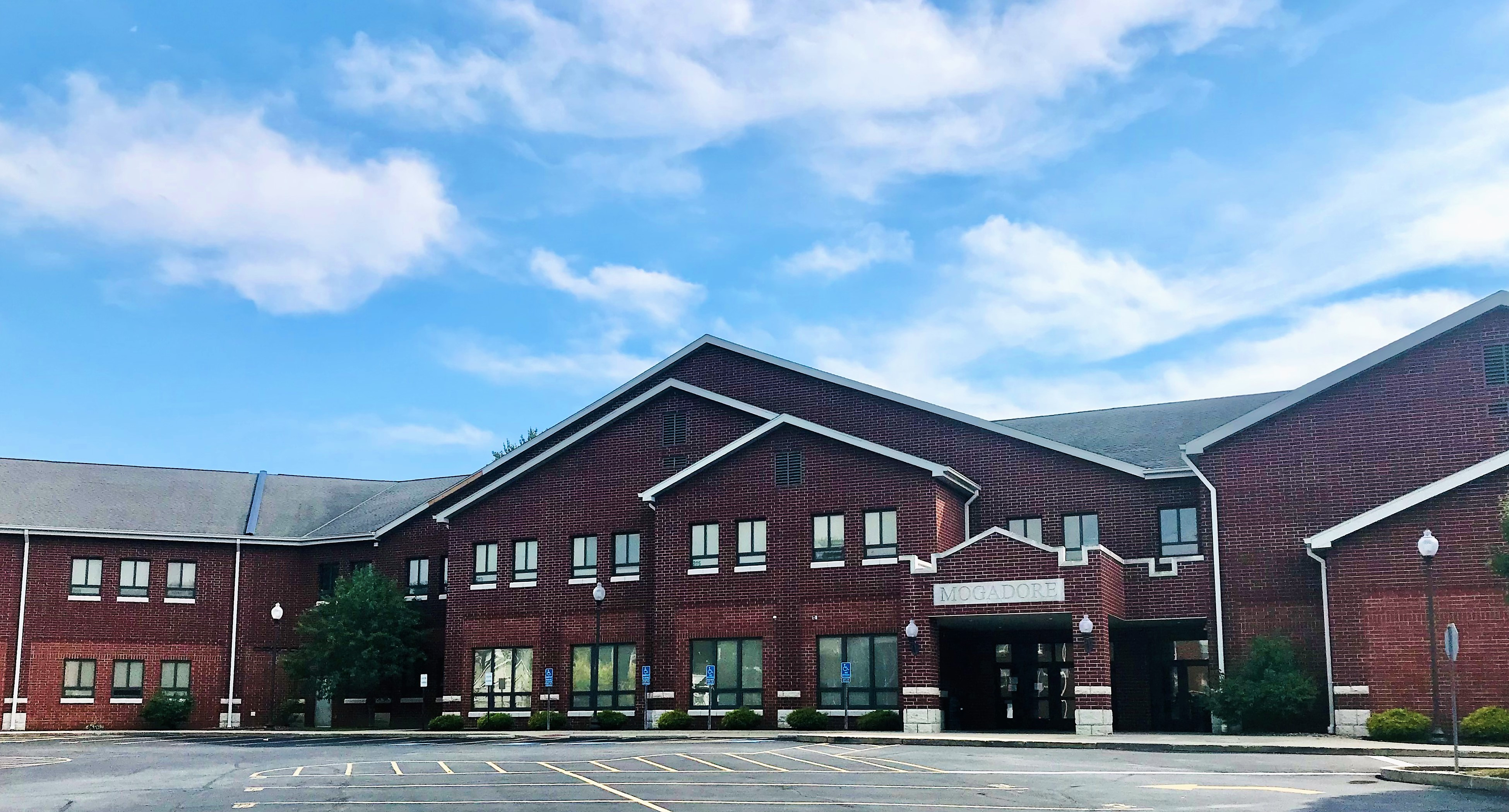

Location
- 130 South Cleveland Avenue; Mogadore, Ohio 44260; United States; 41°02′52″N 81°23′40″W

Information
- School type: Public, secondary school
- School district: Mogadore Local School District
- Superintendent: John Knapp
- Principal: Russ Swartz
- Teaching staff: 19.35 (FTE)
- Grades: 9–12
- Enrollment: 201 (2024-2025)
- Student to teacher ratio: 10.39
- Color
- Team name: Wildcats
- Website: www.mogadore.net/page/about-us

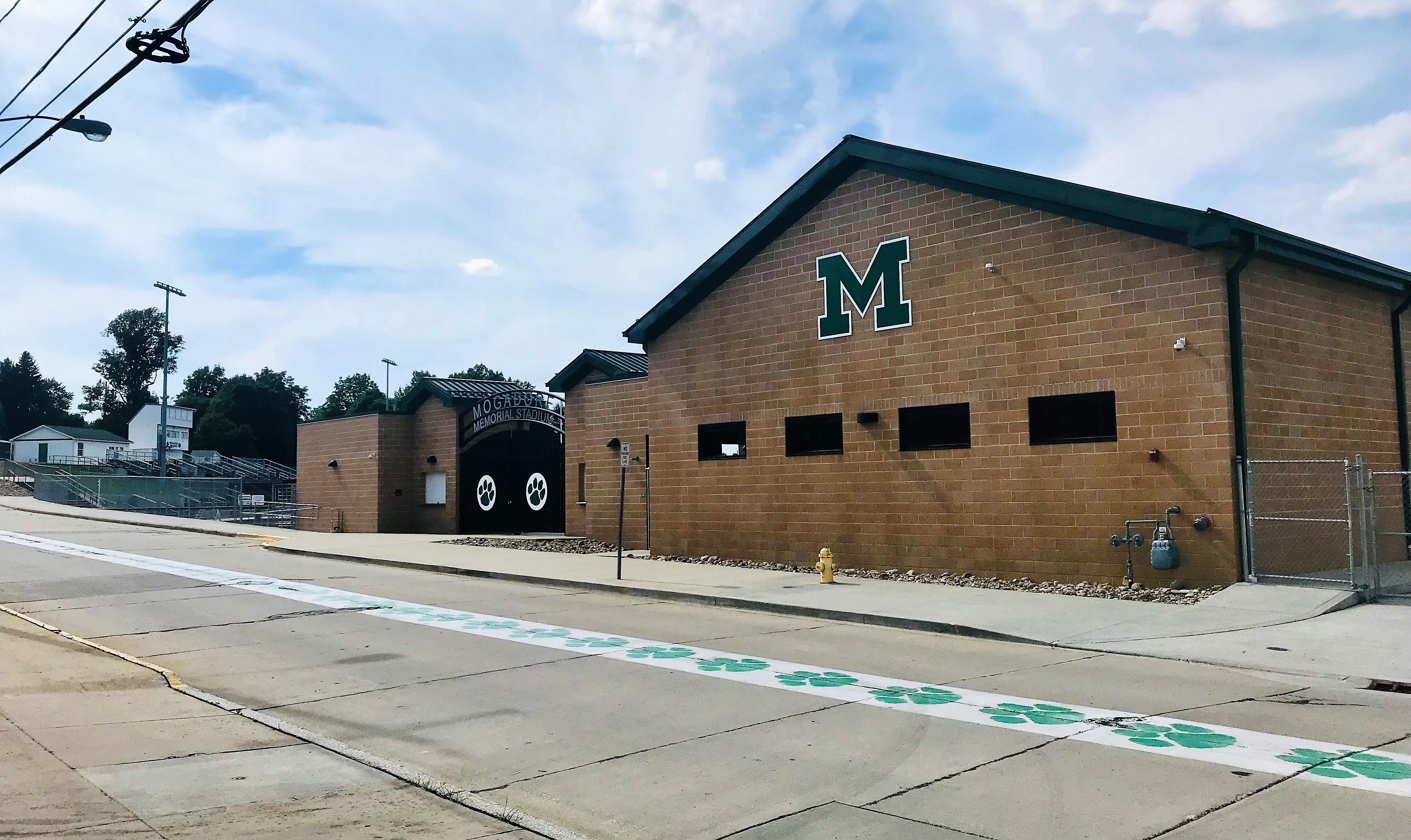
New entrance and field house

Mogadore High School is a public high school in Mogadore, Ohio. It is the only high school in the Mogadore Local School District. Athletic teams are known as the Wildcats and they compete as a member of the Ohio High School Athletic Association.

== History ==
Mogadore High School serves students grades 9-12.

In May 2018, a fire broke out at the football stadiums field house. The district decided to build a new athletic complex that included a new track, field turf and field house, which cost around $6 million.

== Athletics ==
Mogadore High School currently offers:

- Baseball
- Basketball
- Cheerleading
- Cross Country
- Golf
- Football
- Soccer
- Softball
- Track and field
- Volleyball
- Wrestling

=== State championships ===
- Football – 1954, 1979, 1996, 2002
- Boys golf – 1971, 1972, 1973

=== Associated Press state championships ===
- Boys basketball – 1980
- Football – 1979, 1980, 1983, 1985, 2001, 2012
