= Springfield Township, Summit County, Ohio =

Township in Ohio, US

- Township
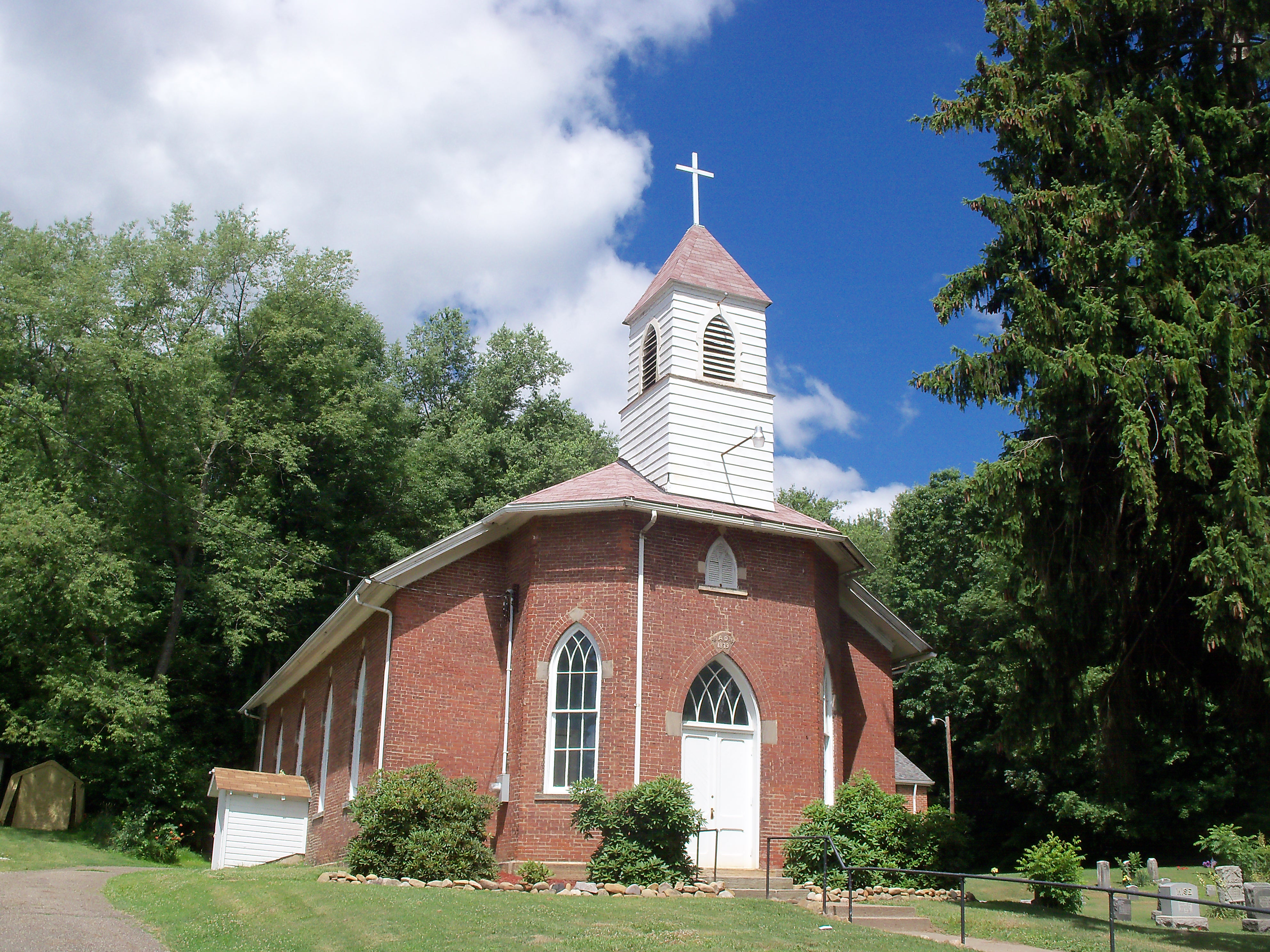
- Millheim United Church of Christ (1879)

- Location in Summit County and the state of Ohio.
- Coordinates: 41°1′46″N 81°26′3″W
- Country: United States
- State: Ohio
- County: Summit
- Established: 1808

Area
  - Total: 15.1 sq mi (39.0 km^{2})
  - Land: 14.7 sq mi (38.1 km^{2})
  - Water: 0.35 sq mi (0.9 km^{2})
- Elevation: 1,080 ft (330 m)

Population (2020)
  - Total: 14,162
  - Density: 963/sq mi (371.7/km^{2})
- Time zone: UTC-5 (Eastern (EST))
  - Summer (DST): UTC-4 (EDT)
- FIPS code: 39-74130
- GNIS feature ID: 1087017
- Website: Springfield Township

Springfield Township is one of the nine townships of Summit County, Ohio, United States. The population was 14,162 at the 2020 census.

== Geography ==
Located in the southeastern part of the county, it borders the following townships and cities:

- Tallmadge - north
- Brimfield Township, Portage County - northeast corner
- Suffield Township, Portage County - east
- Lake Township - southeast
- Green - south
- Coventry Township - west
- Akron - northwest

Several municipalities are located in the original boundaries of Springfield Township:

- Part of the city of Akron, the county seat of Summit County, in the northwest
- Part of the village of Mogadore, in the northeast
- The village of Lakemore, in the center

The unincorporated community and census-designated place of Sawyerwood is located in the north-central area of the township. It borders the Ellet neighborhood of Akron.

It is about 14.7 square miles (38 km^{2}) in size (Springfield Township, 2003-2004).

== Name and history ==
It is one of eleven Springfield Townships statewide. It was part of the Connecticut Western Reserve. It is named after the Connecticut River Valley city of Springfield, Massachusetts.

== Government ==
The township is governed by a three-member board of trustees, who are elected in November of odd-numbered years to a four-year term beginning on the following January 1. Two are elected in the year after the presidential election and one is elected in the year before it. There is also an elected township fiscal officer, who serves a four-year term beginning on April 1 of the year after the election, which is held in November of the year before the presidential election. Vacancies in the fiscal officership or on the board of trustees are filled by the remaining trustees.

== Education ==
Springfield Local School District encompasses Springfield Township and the village of Lakemore. Portage Lakes Career Center is the vocational school for Springfield. (Summit County Fiscal Officer, 2005) The school district has faced serious financial difficulty; at the current time, the district's student transportation is at state minimum, and the district is actively cutting staff.

Springfield's original high school had been annexed by Akron in 1929, requiring construction of the older building of the former high school which was replaced in 2014 in the same location. The original building became part of Akron Public Schools, at first Ellet High School, and later Ritzman Elementary. That building was also recently demolished, and a new school was built upon its site.

== Notable residents ==
- Art Arfons, land speed record holder
- Walt Arfons, land speed record holder and half brother of Art Arfons
- Ernest Angley, Christian evangelist

== See also ==
- Springfield High School (Lakemore, Ohio)
