= Emilia Sykes =

American politician (born 1986)

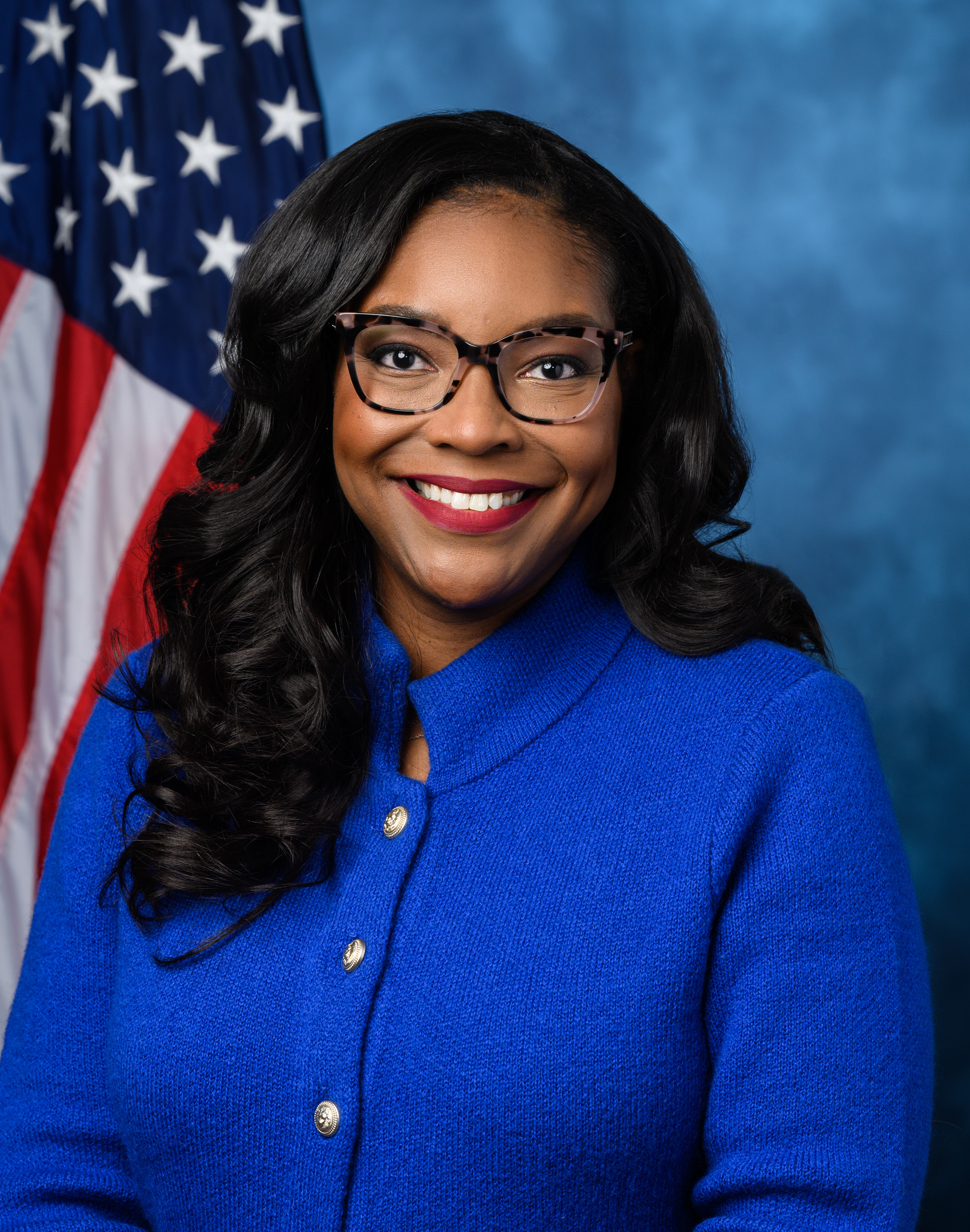
- Official portrait, 2023

Member of the U.S. House of Representatives from Ohio's 13th district
- Incumbent
- Assumed office January 3, 2023
- Preceded by: Tim Ryan

Minority Leader of the Ohio House of Representatives
- In office February 6, 2019 – December 31, 2021
- Preceded by: Fred Strahorn
- Succeeded by: Kristin Boggs (acting)

Member of the Ohio House of Representatives from the 34th district
- In office January 6, 2015 – December 31, 2022
- Preceded by: Vernon Sykes
- Succeeded by: Casey Weinstein (redistricted)

Personal details
- Born: Emilia Strong Sykes; January 4, 1986 (age 40) Akron, Ohio, U.S.
- Party: Democratic
- Spouse: Kevin Boyce (m. 2022)
- Relatives: Vernon Sykes (father); Barbara Sykes (mother)
- Education: Kent State University (BA) University of Florida (JD, MPH)
- Website: House website Campaign website

Emilia Strong Sykes (born January 4, 1986) is an American politician serving as the U.S. representative for Ohio's 13th congressional district since 2023. A member of the Democratic Party, she represented the 34th district of the Ohio House of Representatives, centered on Akron, from 2015 to 2022, and served as minority leader of that chamber from 2019 to 2021.

Sykes was first elected to Congress in 2022 and narrowly won reelection in 2024 in one of the country's most competitive House races. She is a member of the bipartisan Problem Solvers Caucus and is a member of the moderate New Democrat Coalition. In the House, she serves on the House Transportation and Infrastructure Committee as the vice ranking member and on the Science, Space, and Technology Committee. She is seeking a third term in 2026.

== Early life, education, and career ==
Emilia Strong Sykes was born and raised in Akron, Ohio. She is the daughter of state senator Vernon Lee Sykes and former state representative Barbara Ann Sykes (née Johnson), who successively held the same seat from 1982 to 2014. Between Vernon, Barbara, and Emilia, the Sykes family held the seat for 40 years. Sykes pursued dance and competed in gymnastics during her childhood and made it to the AAU Junior Olympics, where she focused on the vault. She graduated from Firestone High School.

Sykes attended Kent State University in Ohio, where she graduated magna cum laude with a Bachelor of Arts in psychology. She received a Juris Doctor from the University of Florida Levin College of Law and a Master of Public Health from the College of Public Health and Health Professions.

Sykes worked as a law clerk for the chief judge of the U.S. Bankruptcy Court in the Northern District of Georgia. Afterwards, she served as an administrative advisor in the Summit County fiscal office.

== Ohio House of Representatives ==
In 2013, she ran for the Ohio House of Representatives to succeed her father, Vernon, who was term-limited. She won the Democratic nomination by defeating Summit County councilman Frank Communale. She later defeated Republican nominee Cynthia Blake in the general election by 72%–28% of the vote.

In 2015, Sykes and fellow Democratic lawmaker Greta Johnson introduced legislation to remove the sales tax on feminine hygiene products. In 2017, She co-authored legislation with Republican lawmaker Nathan Manning to expand Ohio law to allow victims of dating violence to obtain civil protection orders and access domestic violence shelters, which was signed into law by Republican Governor John Kasich in 2018. Before joining caucus leadership, Sykes served as the ranking member of the House Finance Committee and as assistant minority whip. She became assistant minority leader in late 2018.

=== Minority leader ===
In 2019, Sykes was elected as the leader of the Democratic caucus, becoming the minority leader of the Ohio House. During her first year as leader of the Democratic caucus, the number of bipartisan bills passed in the Ohio House was nearly double the combined total of the previous four years.

During the 2020 Democratic Party presidential primaries, Sykes endorsed Joe Biden. That same year, she won the EMILY's List 2020 Gabby Giffords Rising Star Award. After Speaker Larry Householder was arrested on federal racketeering charges as a part of the Ohio FirstEnergy bribery scandal, Sykes joined those calling for him to resign as speaker.

Sykes unveiled a Democratic gun package in 2021 that included universal background checks and repeal of the state's stand-your-ground law. That July, Sykes was among 14 Democrats who voted against the state's two year budget despite her support of the Fair School Funding Plan, which reconfigured how schools were financed in the state. She objected to the budget's tax cuts and other budgetary provisions.

As minority leader, Sykes served as one of the two Democrats on the seven member Ohio Redistricting Commission in 2021. She served alongside her father, who was the commission's Democratic co-chair. That September, she voted against the Republican-drawn Ohio General Assembly maps, arguing that they eliminated the ability of women and of minority voters protected by the Voting Rights Act to have their votes heard.

== U.S. House of Representatives ==
=== Elections ===
Ohio's 13th congresional district centered on Akron (2023–2027)

==== 2022 ====
In January 2022, Sykes announced her candidacy for Ohio's 13th congressional district. In November 2022, she won the general election, defeating Republican nominee Madison Gesiotto Gilbert.

==== 2024 ====
In 2024, Sykes ran for reelection in Ohio's 13th congressional district, a race widely viewed as one of the most competitive in the country. She faced Republican Kevin Coughlin, who received strong support from national Republican groups, including a campaign visit from House Speaker Mike Johnson. The race saw significant outside spending. OpenSecrets reported over $6 million in ad spending opposing Sykes, with $3.84 million funded by the Congressional Leadership Fund. Sykes was reelected with 51.1% of the vote to Coughlin's 48.9%.

==== 2026 ====
In September 2025, Coughlin announced his plans to run for the 13th district again, setting up a likely rematch between him and Sykes. The following month, the Ohio Redistricting Commission adopted a new congressional map as part of the wider redistricting battle nationwide, leaving the 13th district leaning more Democratic. Sykes said she would run for reelection in the redrawn district, and Coughlin announced that he was withdrawing from the race. In the general election, Sykes faces Republican Carey Coleman, a former radio host and TV meteorologist.

=== Tenure ===
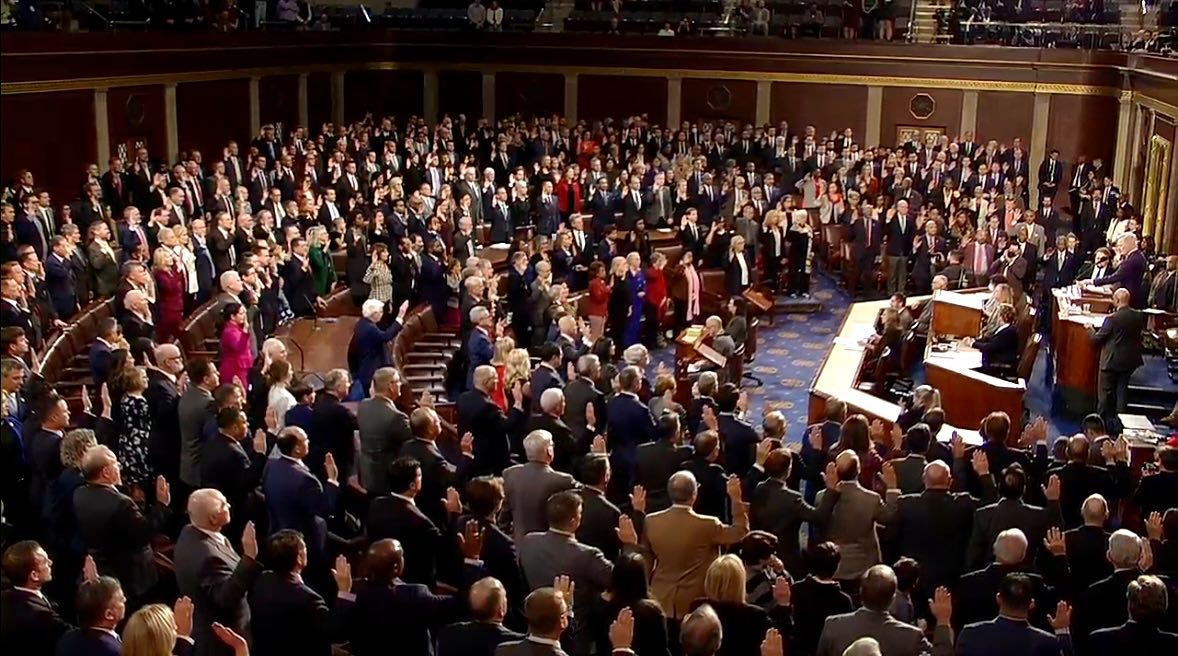
Sykes and the 118th Congress are sworn into the U.S. House of Representatives, 2023

Sykes entered the U.S. House of Representatives in 2023. She cast her first vote on January 3 to support Democrat Hakeem Jeffries as Speaker of the House and was officially sworn in as a member of the 118th Congress on January 7. During her first term, she was appointed to the committees on Transportation and Infrastructure and on Science, Space, and Technology. Following the 2023 East Palestine train derailment in Ohio, Sykes and Representative Bill Johnson (R-OH) introduced the bipartisan RAIL Act to strengthen railroad safety regulations and prevent future accidents.

In 2024, Sykes helped secure Akron's designation as one of seven regional tech hubs in the country, with its focus on sustainable plastics and rubber manufacturing. The initiative was projected to create 6,300 jobs and attract $1.8 billion in private investment over ten years. Reflecting on Akron’s history as the “Rubber Capital of the World", she also cosponsored a bipartisan bill with Representative Darin LaHood (R-IL) to offer a thirty percent tax credit for purchasing retreaded tires in order to support domestic manufacturing and local jobs.

During the 119th Congress, as vice ranking member of the House Transportation and Infrastructure Committee, Sykes urged state officials to include an Akron–Canton stop in the 2025 Ohio State Rail Plan. She also introduced the Airline Passenger Compensation Act, co-led by Representatives Rick Larsen (D-WA) and Greg Stanton (D-AZ), which would require airlines to provide cash compensation and free rebooking for significant delays or cancellations caused by carriers, reviving elements of a withdrawn Biden administration proposal.

The 2025 government shutdown prompted Sykes to warn of the effects of expiring Affordable Care Act subsidies and uncertainty surrounding SNAP funding. She also highlighted the shutdown's impact on federal workers and constituent services, including delays in Social Security casework, while participating in bipartisan efforts to resolve the budget impasse. She later introduced the GUARD Act to keep the Social Security Administration operational during future government shutdowns.

=== Committee assignments ===
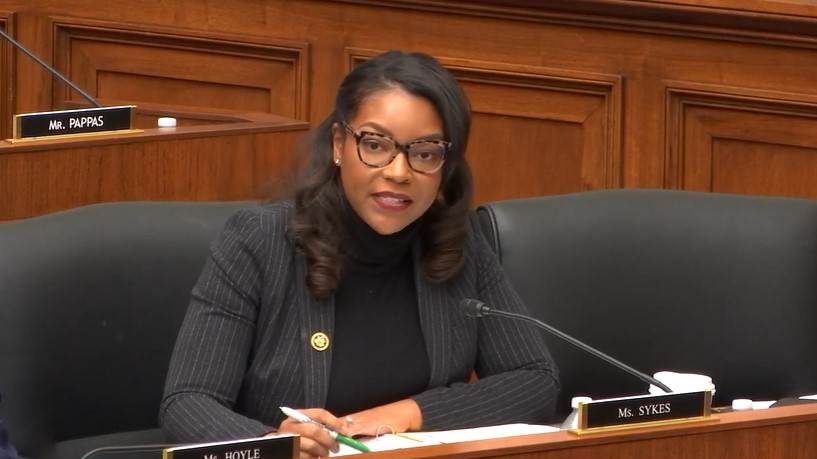
Sykes on the Committee on Transportation and Infrastructure

Sykes's committee assignments for the 119th Congress include:

- Committee on Science, Space, and Technology
  - Subcommittee on Investigations and Oversight (ranking member)
- Committee on Transportation and Infrastructure (vice ranking member)
  - Subcommittee on Highways and Transit
  - Subcommittee on Railroads, Pipelines and Hazardous Materials
  - Subcommittee on Water Resources and Environment

=== Caucus memberships ===
Sykes's caucus memberships include:

- Problem Solvers Caucus (co-chair of the tariffs, trade and strategic competition working group)
- New Democrat Coalition (vice-chair of the affordable housing taskforce)
- Bipartisan Women's Caucus (co-chair)
- Congressional Black Caucus (co-chair of the environmental justice, clean energy and infrastructure taskforce)
- Future Forum

== Political positions ==
Sykes is considered a moderate Democrat. She has emphasized working across party lines, and has said that she cannot represent her closely divided district "without taking in all perspectives."

=== Economy ===
During her 2024 campaign, Sykes said she would reintroduce her Lower Your Taxes Act, which would expand the earned income tax credit and restore the expanded child tax credit. She has criticized the One Big Beautiful Bill Act as harmful to Medicaid recipients.

=== Infrastructure ===
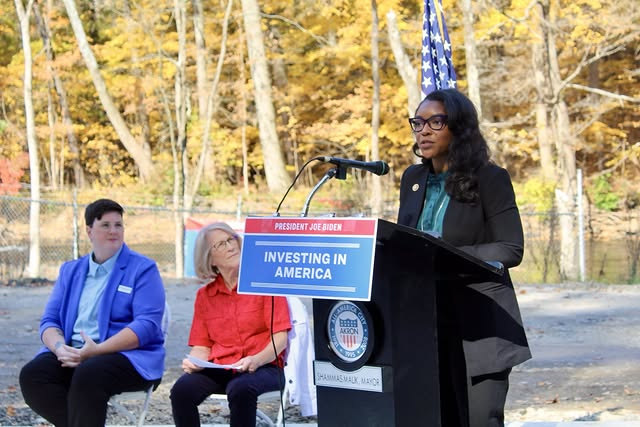
Sykes announces federal funding for water infrastructure in 2024

Sykes has supported federal investment in water infrastructure and flood mitigation projects, including dam rehabilitation such as improvements to the Wolf Creek Dam in Barberton. She has also supported broader federal investments totaling $169 million for Ohio’s drinking water, wastewater, and stormwater infrastructure. In addition, she has cosponsored the bipartisan Ohio River Restoration Program Act, which would establish an EPA-led program to fund restoration of the Ohio River basin.

=== Healthcare ===
In Congress, she co-introduced the Black Maternal Health Momnibus Act in 2023, a legislative package designed to address racial disparities in maternal mortality. The act includes 13 bills focused on reducing pregnancy-related deaths through measures like nutrition programs, maternal vaccination promotion, and mental health support for mothers.

=== Law enforcement ===
Sykes co-introduced the bipartisan Enhancing COPS Hiring Program Grants for Local Law Enforcement Act in 2023, alongside Representatives Greg Landsman, Mike Carey, and Max Miller. The bill proposes allowing law enforcement agencies to use federal grants for recruitment and retention bonuses. She has also sponsored legislation to fund scenario-based de-escalation training for police, with a grant program to support smaller departments to be able to afford the programs.

=== Technology ===
Sykes has called for a cautious approach to data center expansion, saying that Congress needs to weigh the "trade-offs of data centers." She advocated for putting "strong guardrails" in place to protect areas that house them instead of dealing with the problems after they happen.

== Personal life ==
Sykes married Democratic politician Kevin Boyce, a former Ohio state treasurer who serves as a Franklin County commissioner, on September 10, 2022 at the Akron Art Museum. She has two step-children. She is a Baptist. She is also a member of Alpha Kappa Alpha sorority and has described herself as an introvert who prefers to work in smaller groups behind the scenes.

== Electoral history ==
Ohio House 34th District
Year	Democrat	Votes	Pct	Republican	Votes	Pct
2014	Emilia Sykes	17,299	71.9%	Cynthia Blake	6,082	28.1%
2016	Emilia Sykes	35,154	77.1%	Gene Littlefield	10,420	22.9%
2018	Emilia Sykes	30,164	78.4%	Josh Sines	8,329	21.6%
2020	Emilia Sykes	36,251	76.8%	Henry Todd	10,926	23.2%

US House Ohio 13th District
Year		Votes	Pct		Votes	Pct
2022	Emilia Sykes	149,816	52.7%	Madison Gesiotto Gilbert	134,593	47.3%
2024	Emilia Sykes	197,461	51.1%	Kevin Coughlin	188,996	48.9%

== See also ==
- List of African-American United States representatives
- Women in the United States House of Representatives

Ohio House of Representatives
Preceded by Fred Strahorn	Minority Leader of the Ohio House of Representatives; 2019–2021	Succeeded by Kristin Boggs; Acting
U.S. House of Representatives
Preceded by Tim Ryan	Member of the U.S. House of Representatives from Ohio's 13th congressional district 2023–present	Incumbent
U.S. order of precedence (ceremonial)
Preceded by Dale Strong	United States representatives by seniority 350th	Succeeded by Shri Thanedar
