= Barbara Sykes (politician) =

American politician

Member of the Ohio House of Representatives from the 44th district
- In office January 3, 2001 – December 31, 2006
- Preceded by: Vernon Sykes
- Succeeded by: Vernon Sykes

Personal details
- Born: Barbara Ann Johnson
- Party: Democratic
- Spouse: Vernon Sykes
- Children: Emilia Sykes

Barbara Ann Sykes (née Johnson) is an American politician who served as a member of the Ohio House of Representatives, representing the 44th district from 2001 to 2006. Prior to that she served on the Akron City Council. Sykes was elected to a four-year term on the Akron School Board in 2023.

Ohio House of Representatives
Preceded by Vernon Sykes	Member of the Ohio House of Representatives from the 44th district January 3, 2001 – December 31, 2006	Succeeded by Vernon Sykes
Party political offices
Preceded by Mary Ellen Withrow	Democratic nominee for Treasurer of Ohio; 1994	Succeeded by John A. Donofrio
Preceded by Helen Knipe Smith	Democratic nominee for Auditor of Ohio; 2006	Succeeded by David Pepper
