= Kate Tucker & the Sons of Sweden =

US musical group

Kate Tucker is an American songwriter, singer and producer. She is lead singer and guitarist of Kate Tucker and the Sons of Sweden and is also one half of the pop duo Little Reader.

== History ==
Formed in 2007, Kate Tucker & the Sons of Sweden's eponymous debut was produced by Ryan Hadlock (Metric, The Lumineers) and features guest vocals by American folk singer Damien Jurado. Upon release, their single "Faster than Cars Drive" topped the blog charts, charted CMJ radio, and received heavy rotation on Starbucks in-store playlists. In 2009 the Hear Music label debuted the band's cover of Bruce Springsteen’s "I’m On Fire" on the Starbucks Sweetheart compilation.

Songs from their first record have been featured on major television networks and indie films including "Everything Went Down" on ABC Family's Make It or Break It and on The WB's One Tree Hill, and "In Your Dreams" on MTV's Catfish. The official music video for "Everything Went Down" was directed and filmed by Miriam Bennett.

In 2009, Tucker left the Sons of Sweden to work on what would become the album White Horses, produced by Blake Wescott. Ed O’Brien (bass), Mark Isakson (guitars), and Nic Danielson (keys) continued to collaborate with Tucker on studio recordings.

Songs from the White Horses album featured on television include:

- "Where are You (I am Already Gone)" was played on United States of Tara Season 3 Episode 2 and Pretty Little Liars Episode 15.
- "First to Leave" on CSI Miami.

On April 7, 2011 the original Seattle-based lineup of Kate Tucker and the Sons of Sweden reunited to play what could be called their final farewell show at the Tractor Tavern in Ballard, Washington.

Tucker relocated to Nashville, Tennessee in 2012 where she took up the Sons of Sweden project again, this time with new members, Wes Chandler, Ethan Place, and Matthew Thompson. Nic Danielson continues to be a main collaborator from afar along with Mark Isakson.

On April 18, 2013 Kate Tucker and the Sons of Sweden released Long View, a song sampler exclusively available on NoiseTrade. Included are songs from their forthcoming album, The Shape, The Color, The Feel, along with live versions of previously released tracks and their entire debut album.

Tucker went on to produce what Huffington Post called an "admirably ambitious" Kickstarter, raising over 20K to fund The Shape, The Color, The Feel visual album a collaboration between Kate Tucker & the Sons of Sweden and 10 filmmakers, 3 choreographers, 2 visual artists, and the Nashville community, resulting in a full-length album on vinyl with 12 music videos, 2 short films and a forthcoming documentary directed by Miriam Bennett.

Kate Tucker & the Sons of Sweden toured the US in 2014 - 2015. In 2016, Tucker stepped back to focus on songwriting and recording, forming a new project called Little Reader with Ross Flournoy (The Broken West and Apex Manor), Mark Watrous (The Shins), and Graham Beckler who had joined Sons of Sweden as a drummer in 2015.

Little Reader released their debut album, The Big Score, on May 19, 2017. The music video for "Speed of Light," directed by Jessie English, premiered on Conan's Team Coco.

In fall of 2017, Tucker announced the coming of her new solo record, Practical Sadness, with a debut single "In Your Arms" out November 17 complete with a VR experience. She released "It's True," the second single, on December 22, 2017 and the full length album on April 6, 2018, followed by a solo US tour.

On June 8, 2018 Tucker released a bonus track to Practical Sadness, called "All I Ever Wanted," produced by Paul Mahern.

== Discography ==
- Eros Turannos- Kate Tucker (Red Valise, 2005)
- Kate Tucker & the Sons of Sweden - Kate Tucker and the Sons of Sweden (Red Valise, 2007)
- White Horses - Kate Tucker (Red Valise, 2010)
- Ghost of Something New - Kate Tucker (Red Valise, 2012)
- The Shape The Color The Feel - Kate Tucker and the Sons of Sweden (Red Valise, 2014)
- The Big Score - Little Reader (self-released, 2017)
- Practical Sadness - Kate Tucker (Red Valise, 2018)

== Film career ==
Kate Tucker's experience producing music videos of her own brought her to fashion and film, producing projects for Remedial Media, Conde Nast, Moving Studio, Nicole Kidman and Karen Elson. Tucker is currently directing the feature-length documentary Comeback Evolution about the life and work of Walter Delbridge, a 71-year-old poet and artist living with schizophrenia.

In 2010, Tucker took the lead role in a feature film entitled Everything Went Down, marking her acting debut. The film was based in part on Tucker's songs, and also stars Vancouver theatre artist Noah Drew. Everything Went Down was written and directed by Dustin Morrow.

Tucker has participated in various film festivals including Sundance, TIFF, and Stony Brook, where in addition to performing with her band, she has spoken on the intersection of film and music.
