= Mogadore Local School District =

Mogadore High School
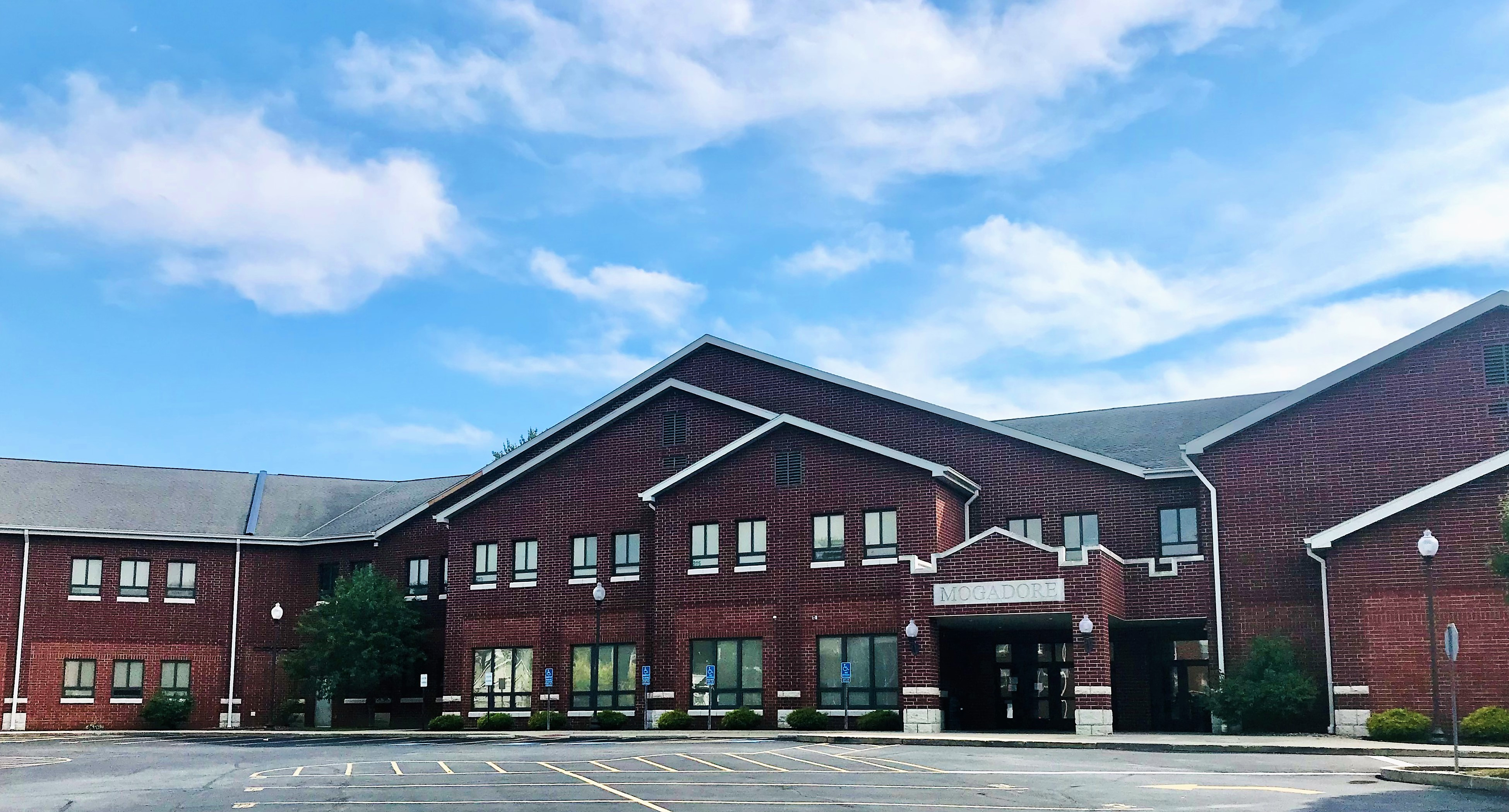
- Mogadore High School

Location
- 1 South Cleveland Avenue; Mogadore, Ohio 44260; United States

Information
- Funding type: Public
- NCES District ID: 3905003
- Superintendent: John Knapp
- Teaching staff: 58.85 (FTE)
- Grades: K-12
- Enrollment: 649 (2024-25)
- Student to teacher ratio: 11.03
- Color
- Team name: Wildcats
- Website: www.mogadore.net

The Mogadore Local School District is a school district located in Mogadore, Ohio, United States. The school district consists of one high school, one junior high school and one elementary school.

== History ==
The Mogadore Local School District formed in the early 1900s

A new gymnasium was built at the high school in 1950. A new gym was built later on.

In May 2018, a fire broke out at the football stadiums field house. The district decided to build a new athletic complex that included a new track, field turf and field house, which costed around $6 million.

== Schools ==
=== High School ===
- Mogadore High School

=== Middle School ===
- Mogadore Junior High School

=== Elementary School ===
- O.H. Somers Elementary School
