= Springfield Local School District (Summit County) =

School district in Ohio, United States

Address
- 2410 Massillon Road Akron, Ohio, 44312; United States

District information
- Type: Public
- Grades: PreK–12
- NCES District ID: 3905006

Students and staff
- Students: 2,058 (2020–2021)
- Teachers: 115.99 (on an FTE basis)
- Staff: 148.45 (on an FTE basis)
- Student–teacher ratio: 17.74:1

Other information
- Website: www.springfieldspartans.org

The Springfield Local School District is a public school district in Summit County, Ohio, United States, that covers Springfield Township and the village of Lakemore. The school district currently serves 2,226 students as of the 2020–21 school year.

== Board of education ==
The superintendent of the district is Shelley Monachino. The board is currently seated by five members.

== Finance ==
As of May 2022, Springfield Local School District has been operating for 22 years without new sources of financing. Early on in the COVID-19 pandemic, the Ohio Department of Education cut nearly half a million dollars of funding to the district, and Springfield introduced a $7.7 million levy that would keep the district financially stable. The levy was defeated by voters in both August and November of that year, and Springfield was forced to begin drastic budget cuts. Provisions of the cuts include closing Young Elementary School, cutting 20.75 positions in the spring of 2021, cutting 46 positions in the 2021–22 school year, drastic or complete cuts to electives, and minimum busing requirements per regulations put in place by the state of Ohio. The district has also endorsed the Fair School Funding Plan in hopes that it will mitigate some of the cuts.

== Schools ==
The school district currently runs three schools, and serves students from kindergarten age to senior year.

=== Elementary schools (K-2) ===
- Spring Hill Elementary School (Jennifer Ganzer)

=== Intermediate school (3-6) ===
- Schrop Intermediate School (Tim Burns)

=== High school (7-12) ===
- Springfield High School (Michelle Warner)

=== Closed schools ===
- Milroy School
- Lakemore Elementary School
- Roosevelt Elementary School
- Sawyerwood School
- Boyer Elementary
- Young Elementary

== List of superintendents ==
The following is a list of people who have served as superintendents for Springfield Local School District, beginning with the most recent.

- Shelley Monachino (July 1, 2022 – present)
- William Stauffer (January 1, 2022 – June 30, 2022)
- Charles Sincere (February 1, 2015 – December 31, 2021)

== District enrollment figures (K-12) ==
1965	1970	1974-75	1980	1985	1990	1995	2000	2005	2010	2015	2019	2020	2023
5,078	5,369	5,114	4,271	3,780	3,167	3,369	3,258	2,976	2,394	2,319	2,153	2,112	1,706
