= Kent State University School =

- Kent, Ohio 44242; United States

Information
- Type: Laboratory school
- Founded: 1913 (elementary); 1915 (high school)
- Closed: 1972 (high school); 1978 (junior high); 1982 (elementary)
- Grades: P–12
- Language: English
- Campus: Suburban
- Colors: Blue and white
- Athletics conference: Trolley League (1919–1937); Metro League (1937–1953); Portage County League (1960–1972)
- Team name: Blue Devils (until 1956); Statesmen
- Rivals: Kent Roosevelt Rough Riders
- Yearbook: Hilife, Devil's Diary, The Statesman

Kent State University School ("KSUS") was a laboratory school located in Kent, Ohio, United States, on the campus of Kent State University. The school included grades Pre-K–12 and was divided into elementary, junior high, and high school levels with the high school known as Kent State University High School or Kent State High School (abbreviated "KSUHS" or "KSHS"). Originally developed as a teacher training school, it later evolved into a selective laboratory school connected with the Kent State University College of Education. It was initially housed at Merrill Hall when it opened in 1913 before moving to the William A. Cluff Teacher Training Building, now known as Franklin Hall, in 1928. The school was moved to the new University School building at the corner of Morris Road and East Summit Street in 1956. This building is today known as the Michael Schwartz Center and houses several student services and administrative offices. The university closed the school in phases, starting with the high school portion (grades 10–12) in 1972. The junior high school (grades 7–9) was closed in 1978, and the elementary school closed in 1982.

== History ==
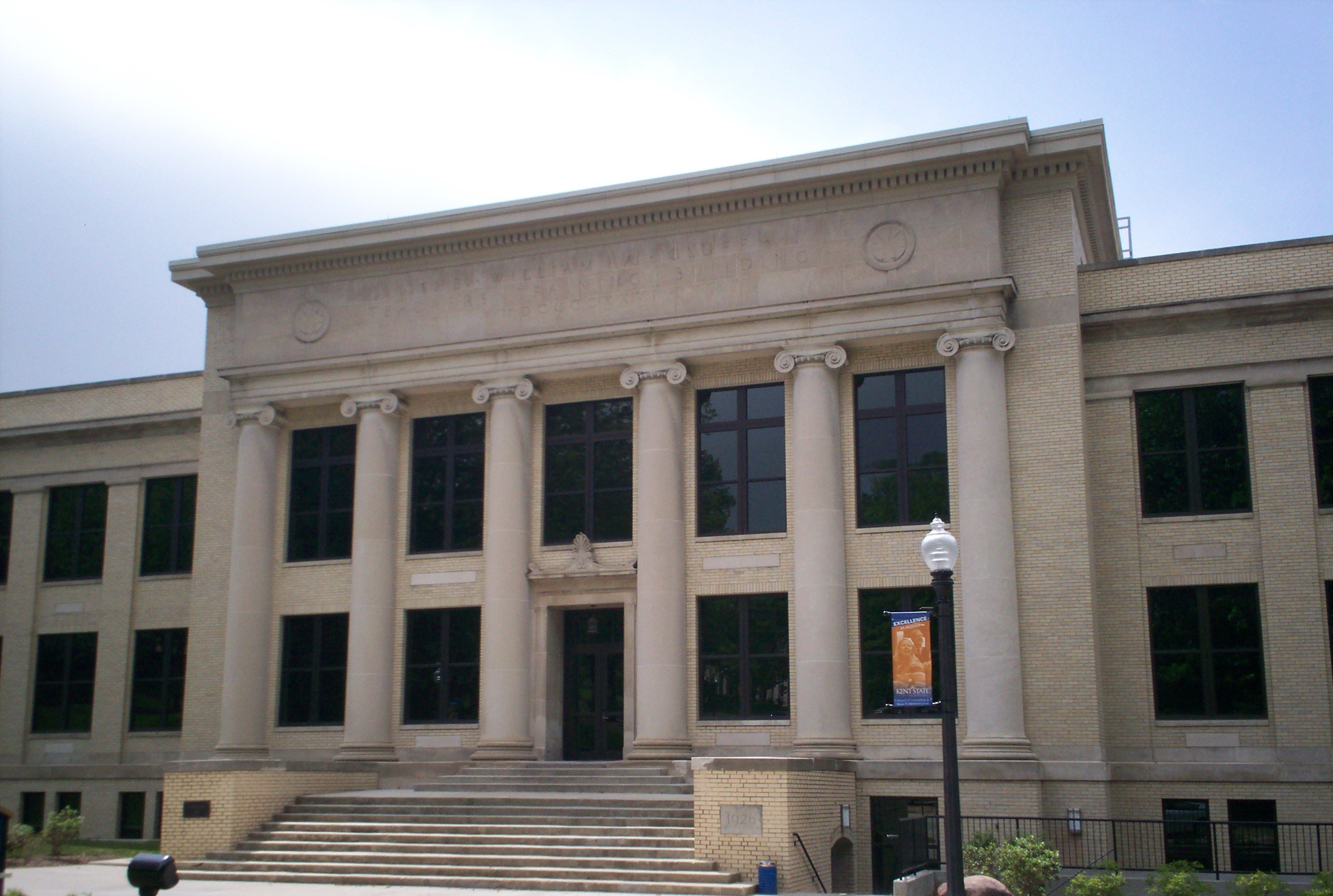
Franklin Hall, built as the Cluff Training School, home of the University School from 1928–1956

A "teacher training school" was part of the original plans at the establishment of the Kent State Normal School in 1910 as the modern practice of placing student teachers in the schools was not yet developed. Providing 250 students for a training school was one of the many stipulations the state of Ohio gave the village of Kent in order to secure the school. The first classes were held in 1913 at the newly completed Merrill Hall and covered grades 1–8 with a kindergarten class at the nearby DePeyster School a few blocks west of campus. Kent State also operated what was known as a "model school" at the schoolhouse near Brady Lake, just east of Kent. The model school was intended to give teachers training in a rural setting.

The high school was established in 1914, adding one grade level per school year, and the first class graduated from the Kent Normal High School in 1918. The school moved into their own building in 1928 with the completion of the William A. Cluff Teacher Training building. In 1956, the school moved to a new building on the southwestern corner of campus. This building, originally known as the University School building, was renamed the Michael Schwartz Center in the 1980s.

By the mid-1950s, the school was no longer using education students as teachers and the school was used more as a research opportunity for students and faculty than a training school. Some of the educational innovations developed at the school included the team-teaching concept, integrative curriculum, block and modular scheduling, and middle school organization. The innovations and the school's reputation for focusing on the individual student attracted students from the region, though most of the student body was made up of local students in and around Kent.

Budget constraints in the 1970s, exacerbated by the university's enrollment decline following the Kent State shootings, led to the gradual closing of the school beginning in 1972 with the senior high school (grades 10–12). The junior high school grades (7–9) followed in 1978 and the remainder of the school was closed in 1982 over fierce protests from parents and alumni.

== Student body ==
Initially, the student body came from a specific area in Kent, which was determined in coordination with the Kent City School District. A 1915 Kent Courier article defined the area as being between Main Street and Williams Street, east of the railroad, but also included students from northeast Kent. By 1931, the school had an enrollment of 265 students in grades K–6 and 303 students in grades 7–12. The high school enrollment included 105 students from Brimfield and Franklin Townships as neither district had a fourth year of high school available, a common occurrence for many rural schools in the early to mid-twentieth century.

By the early 1960s, the University School became a laboratory school with a selective enrollment and no formal attendance district. Franklin Township schools merged with the Kent City School District in 1959 and while high school students initially continued to attend KSHS, they eventually were transferred to Theodore Roosevelt High School by 1960. In Brimfield, the Field Local School District was created January 1, 1959 and Brimfield high school students were transferred to the new Field High School when it opened in late 1961. Through a selective admissions process, the student body was made up of a variety of students from the areas in and around Kent, attracting students as far away as Cleveland. The school had a policy that classes could not exceed 50% of children of KSU faculty, staff, or students unless there were no names on the waiting list. Priority in admission, however, was given to local students and those who had siblings already attending.

== Campus and facilities ==
All grade levels of the University School were held in the same building. The first building that housed the school—Merrill Hall—was the first building built on the KSU campus so was also home to other university programs and departments. The school's first exclusive home, known as the William A. Cluff Teacher Training Building, served as the school's home for nearly 30 years. Athletic fields for the high school first appear in the 1942 map of campus and were on the opposite side of the campus from the Cluff building. The school had its own athletic facilities once it moved to what is now the Schwartz Center, as the building included its own auditorium and gymnasium. Athletic fields were located just to the east of the building along Summit Street and included a running track.

== State championships ==
- Boys basketball - 1927
- Boys track and field – 1968
- Boys cross country – 1970

== Notable alumni ==
- Robert E. Cook, class of 1938; politician and former member of the United States House of Representatives
- Michael C. Gould, class of 1971; Lieutenant General in the United States Air Force and 18th Superintendent of the United States Air Force Academy
- Betty-Jean Maycock, class of 1959; U.S. Olympian gymnast in 1960

== See also ==
- Ohio State Normal College At Kent
