= Sawyerwood, Ohio =

- CDP
- Interactive map of Sawyerwood, Ohio
- Coordinates: 41°02′04″N 81°26′29″W
- Country: United States
- State: Ohio
- County: Summit
- Township: Springfield

Area
  - Total: 1.00 sq mi (2.58 km^{2})
  - Land: 0.74 sq mi (1.91 km^{2})
  - Water: 0.26 sq mi (0.67 km^{2})
- Elevation: 1,079 ft (329 m)

Population (2020)
  - Total: 1,382
  - Density: 1,872.8/sq mi (723.08/km^{2})
- Time zone: UTC-5 (Eastern (EST))
  - Summer (DST): UTC-4 (EDT)
- FIPS code: 39-70618
- GNIS feature ID: 2628968

Sawyerwood is an unincorporated community and census-designated place in north-central Springfield Township, Summit County, Ohio, United States. As of the 2020 census, Sawyerwood had a population of 1,382.

== History ==
A post office called Sawyerwood was established in 1916, and remained in operation until 1958. The planned community was named after William T. Sawyer, who designed it.

== Demographics ==
Historical population
Census	Pop.	Note	%±
2010	1,540		—
2020	1,382		−10.3%
U.S. Decennial Census

Sawyerwood was first classified as a CDP in the 2010 census, which recorded a population of 1,540 people.

At the 2020 census, there were 1,382 people living the CDP, a drop of 158 from the previous census.
