= Lakemore, Ohio =

Village in Summit County, Ohio

- Village
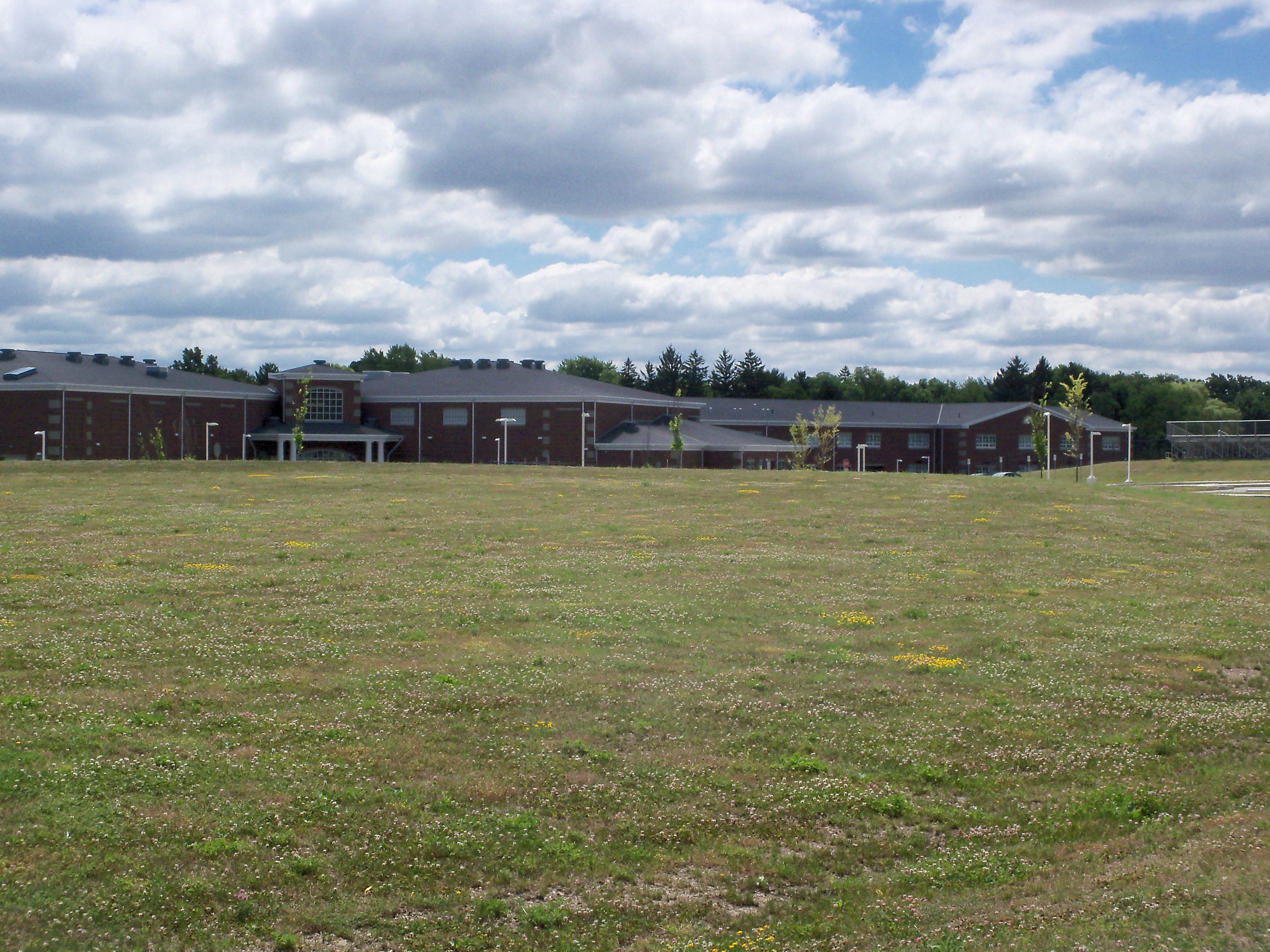
- Springfield High School

- Seal

- Location in Summit County and the state of Ohio.
- Coordinates: 41°01′17″N 81°25′35″W
- Country: United States
- State: Ohio
- County: Summit

Area
  - Total: 1.66 sq mi (4.30 km^{2})
  - Land: 1.45 sq mi (3.76 km^{2})
  - Water: 0.21 sq mi (0.54 km^{2})
- Elevation: 1,102 ft (336 m)

Population (2020)
  - Total: 2,926
  - Density: 2,017.7/sq mi (779.04/km^{2})
- Time zone: UTC-5 (Eastern (EST))
  - Summer (DST): UTC-4 (EDT)
- ZIP code: 44250
- Area code: 330
- FIPS code: 39-41454
- GNIS feature ID: 1087005
- Website: https://lakemoreohio.org/

Lakemore is a village in Summit County, Ohio, United States. The population was 2,926 at the 2020 census. It is part of the Akron metropolitan area.

== Geography ==
According to the United States Census Bureau, the village has a total area of 1.67 square miles (4.33 km^{2}), of which 1.48 square miles (3.83 km^{2}) is land and 0.19 square miles (0.49 km^{2}) is water.

== Demographics ==
Historical population
Census	Pop.	Note	%±
1930	1,670		—
1940	1,832		9.7%
1950	2,463		34.4%
1960	2,765		12.3%
1970	2,708		−2.1%
1980	2,744		1.3%
1990	2,684		−2.2%
2000	2,561		−4.6%
2010	3,068		19.8%
2020	2,926		−4.6%
U.S. Decennial Census

=== 2010 census ===
As of the census of 2010, there were 3,068 people, 1,237 households, and 833 families living in the village. The population density was 2,073.0 inhabitants per square mile (800.4/km^{2}). There were 1,368 housing units at an average density of 924.3 per square mile (356.9/km^{2}). The racial makeup of the village was 95.4% White, 2.0% African American, 0.2% Native American, 0.7% Asian, 0.2% from other races, and 1.4% from two or more races. Hispanic or Latino of any race were 1.1% of the population.

There were 1,237 households, of which 30.3% had children under the age of 18 living with them, 44.7% were married couples living together, 16.3% had a female householder with no husband present, 6.3% had a male householder with no wife present, and 32.7% were non-families. 24.7% of all households were made up of individuals, and 9.6% had someone living alone who was 65 years of age or older. The average household size was 2.47 and the average family size was 2.91.

The median age in the village was 40.3 years. 21.3% of residents were under the age of 18; 8.7% were between the ages of 18 and 24; 26.2% were from 25 to 44; 29.5% were from 45 to 64; and 14.2% were 65 years of age or older. The gender makeup of the village was 47.2% male and 52.8% female.

=== 2000 census ===
As of the census of 2000, there were 2,561 people, 969 households, and 704 families living in the village. The population density was 1,751.8 inhabitants per square mile (676.4/km^{2}). There were 1,018 housing units at an average density of 696.3 per square mile (268.8/km^{2}). The racial makeup of the village was 97.81% White, 0.47% African American, 0.35% Native American, 0.04% Asian, 0.04% Pacific Islander, 0.16% from other races, and 1.13% from two or more races. Hispanic or Latino of any race were 0.51% of the population.

There were 969 households, out of which 32.1% had children under the age of 18 living with them, 52.3% were married couples living together, 13.5% had a female householder with no husband present, and 27.3% were non-families. 21.7% of all households were made up of individuals, and 8.9% had someone living alone who was 65 years of age or older. The average household size was 2.64 and the average family size was 3.07.

In the village, the population was spread out, with 24.9% under the age of 18, 9.1% from 18 to 24, 29.9% from 25 to 44, 24.7% from 45 to 64, and 11.4% who were 65 years of age or older. The median age was 36 years. For every 100 females there were 97.9 males. For every 100 females age 18 and over, there were 96.2 males.

The median income for a household in the village was $34,129, and the median income for a family was $37,174. Males had a median income of $31,288 versus $22,019 for females. The per capita income for the village was $14,837. About 7.4% of families and 10.1% of the population were below the poverty line, including 15.3% of those under age 18 and 2.6% of those age 65 or over

== Government ==
Lakemore is governed by a mayor and six-member council, all of whom are elected at-large to four-year terms.

The current mayor is Richard Cole (D).

The current members of council are:

- Heather Anderson (D)
- Laura Cochran (D) – Council President Pro Tempore
- Nicki Coontz (D)
- Edward Eitner, Sr. (R)
- Sam Ray (D)
- Jon Strittmatter (R)

== Schools ==
Lakemore is part of the school district of neighboring Springfield Township - Springfield Local School District.

Lakemore is home to Springfield Junior High School and Springfield Senior High School.

Lakemore is also home to a private, faith-based K-12 school, SUPER Learning Center.

Lakemore has a public library, a branch of the Akron-Summit County Public Library.
