= Mogadore, Ohio =

- Village
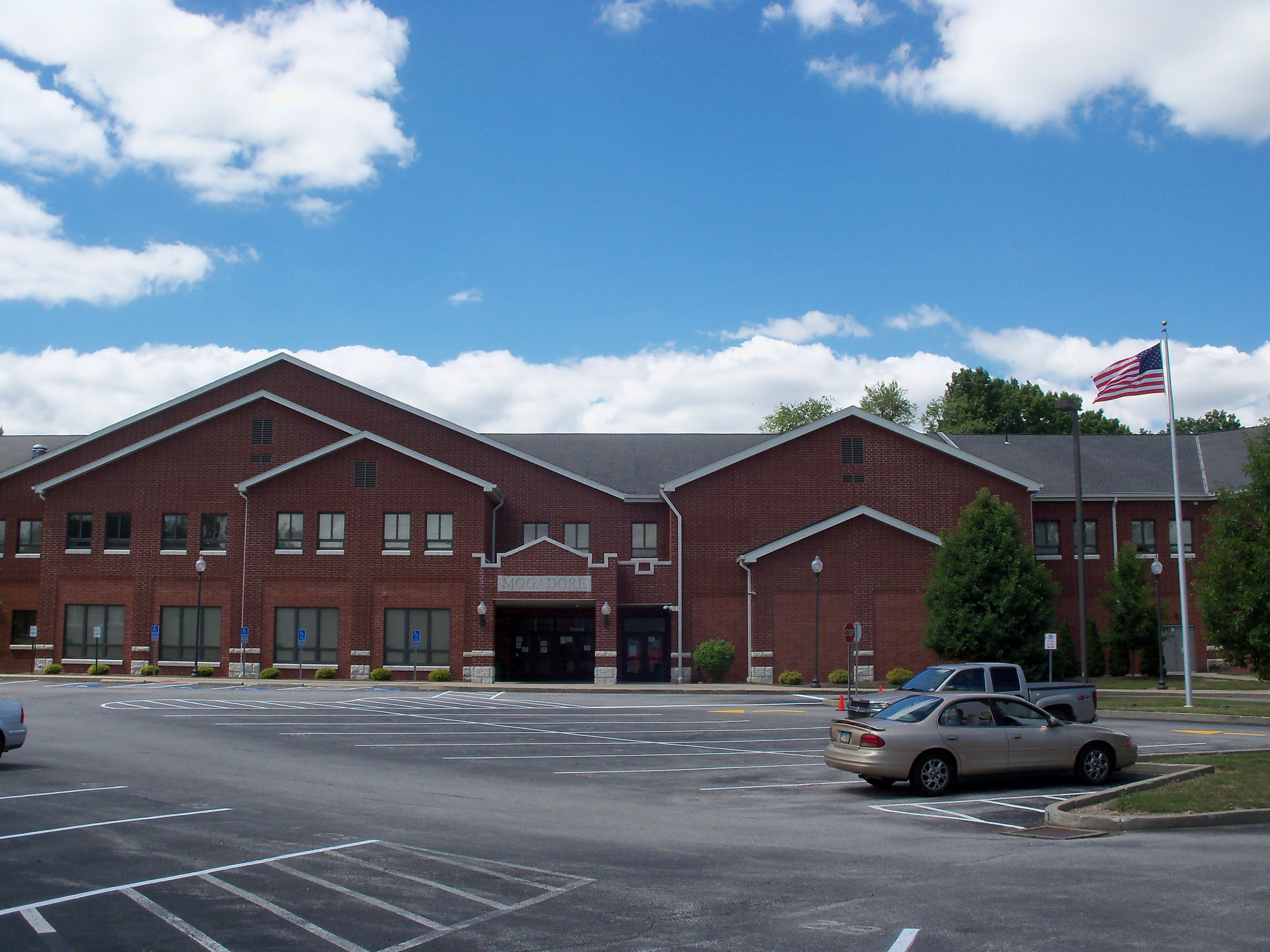
- Mogadore High School
- Interactive map of Mogadore, Ohio
- Location within Ohio Location within the United States
- Coordinates: 41°03′08″N 81°23′58″W
- Country: United States
- State: Ohio
- Counties: Summit, Portage
- Settled: 1807

Area
  - Total: 2.16 sq mi (5.60 km^{2})
  - Land: 2.14 sq mi (5.55 km^{2})
  - Water: 0.019 sq mi (0.05 km^{2})
- Elevation: 1,125 ft (343 m)

Population (2020)
  - Total: 3,811
  - Density: 1,777.9/sq mi (686.45/km^{2})
- Time zone: UTC-5 (Eastern (EST))
  - Summer (DST): UTC-4 (EDT)
- ZIP code: 44260
- Area codes: 330, 234
- FIPS code: 39-51058
- GNIS feature ID: 1086832
- Website: mogadorevillage.org

Mogadore (/ˈmɒɡədɔːr/ MOG-ə-dor) is a village in Portage and Summit counties in the U.S. state of Ohio. The population was 3,811 at the 2020 census. A suburb of Akron, it is part of the Akron metropolitan area.

== History ==
Mogadore is in the part of Ohio known as the Connecticut Western Reserve. The area was first settled in 1807 by Revolutionary War veteran Ariel Bradley. The town was known as Bradleyville until 1825 when it became known as Mogadore. The name comes from the city of Essaouira, Morocco, known historically as Mogador; it may have been inspired by the book Sufferings in Africa, the memoir of a Connecticut merchant ship captain who was captured in North Africa and taken to Mogador.

== Geography ==
Mogadore is located in Summit and Portage Counties, Ohio. According to the United States Census Bureau, the village has a total area of 2.11 square miles (5.46 km^{2}), of which 2.09 square miles (5.41 km^{2}) is land and 0.02 square miles (0.05 km^{2}) is water.

== Demographics ==
Historical population
Census	Pop.	Note	%±
1910	438		—
1920	751		71.5%
1930	1,502		100.0%
1940	1,616		7.6%
1950	1,818		12.5%
1960	3,851		111.8%
1970	4,825		25.3%
1980	4,190		−13.2%
1990	4,008		−4.3%
2000	3,893		−2.9%
2010	3,853		−1.0%
2020	3,811		−1.1%
U.S. Decennial Census

=== 2020 census ===
As of the 2020 census, Mogadore had a population of 3,811. The median age was 42.4 years. 21.4% of residents were under the age of 18 and 20.9% of residents were 65 years of age or older. For every 100 females there were 94.8 males, and for every 100 females age 18 and over there were 94.3 males age 18 and over.

100.0% of residents lived in urban areas, while 0.0% lived in rural areas.

There were 1,551 households in Mogadore, of which 30.7% had children under the age of 18 living in them. Of all households, 50.0% were married-couple households, 16.6% were households with a male householder and no spouse or partner present, and 25.2% were households with a female householder and no spouse or partner present. About 24.5% of all households were made up of individuals and 12.5% had someone living alone who was 65 years of age or older.

There were 1,602 housing units, of which 3.2% were vacant. The homeowner vacancy rate was 1.3% and the rental vacancy rate was 0.3%.

Racial composition as of the 2020 census
Race	Number	Percent
White	3,568	93.6%
Black or African American	11	0.3%
American Indian and Alaska Native	3	0.1%
Asian	13	0.3%
Native Hawaiian and Other Pacific Islander	0	0.0%
Some other race	23	0.6%
Two or more races	193	5.1%
Hispanic or Latino (of any race)	69	1.8%

=== 2010 census ===
As of the census of 2010, there were 3,853 people, 1,481 households, and 1,087 families living in the village. The population density was 1,843.5 inhabitants per square mile (711.8/km^{2}). There were 1,565 housing units at an average density of 748.8 units per square mile (289.1 units/km^{2}). The racial makeup of the village was 97.6% White, 0.3% African American, 0.2% Native American, 0.3% Asian, 0.1% from other races, and 1.5% from two or more races. Hispanic or Latino of any race were 0.9% of the population.

There were 1,481 households, of which 33.2% had children under the age of 18 living with them, 55.9% were married couples living together, 13.1% had a female householder with no husband present, 4.4% had a male householder with no wife present, and 26.6% were non-families. 22.0% of all households were made up of individuals, and 10.7% had someone living alone who was 65 years of age or older. The average household size was 2.60 and the average family size was 3.00. The median age in the village was 41 years. 23% of residents were under the age of 18; 8.5% were between the ages of 18 and 24; 24.1% were from 25 to 44; 27.6% were from 45 to 64; and 16.9% were 65 years of age or older. The gender makeup of the village was 48.5% male and 51.5% female.

=== 2000 census ===
As of the census of 2000, there were 3,893 people, 1,485 households, and 1,125 families living in the village. The population density was 1,860.8 inhabitants per square mile (718.5/km^{2}). There were 1,521 housing units at an average density of 727.0 units per square mile (280.7 units/km^{2}). The racial makeup of the village was 98.69% White, 0.18% African American, 0.05% Native American, 0.15% Asian, and 0.92% from two or more races. Hispanic or Latino of any race were 0.26% of the population.

There were 1,485 households, out of which 31.9% had children under the age of 18 living with them, 63.0% were married couples living together, 8.6% had a female householder with no husband present, and 24.2% were non-families. 21.0% of all households were made up of individuals, and 11.2% had someone living alone who was 65 years of age or older. The average household size was 2.61 and the average family size was 3.01.

In the village, the population umbrella was spread out, with 24.7% under the age of 18, 7.4% from 18 to 24, 28.2% from 25 to 44, 23.1% from 45 to 64, and 16.6% who were 65 years of age or older. The median age was 39 years. For every 100 females, there were 97.2 males. For every 100 females age 18 and over, there were 93.7 males.

The median income for a household in the village was $48,255, and the median income for a family was $53,393. Males had a median income of $36,513 versus $26,557 for females. The per capita income for the village was $20,965. About 2.6% of families and 3.6% of the population were below the poverty line, including 6.8% of those under age 18 and none of those age 65 or over.

== Government ==
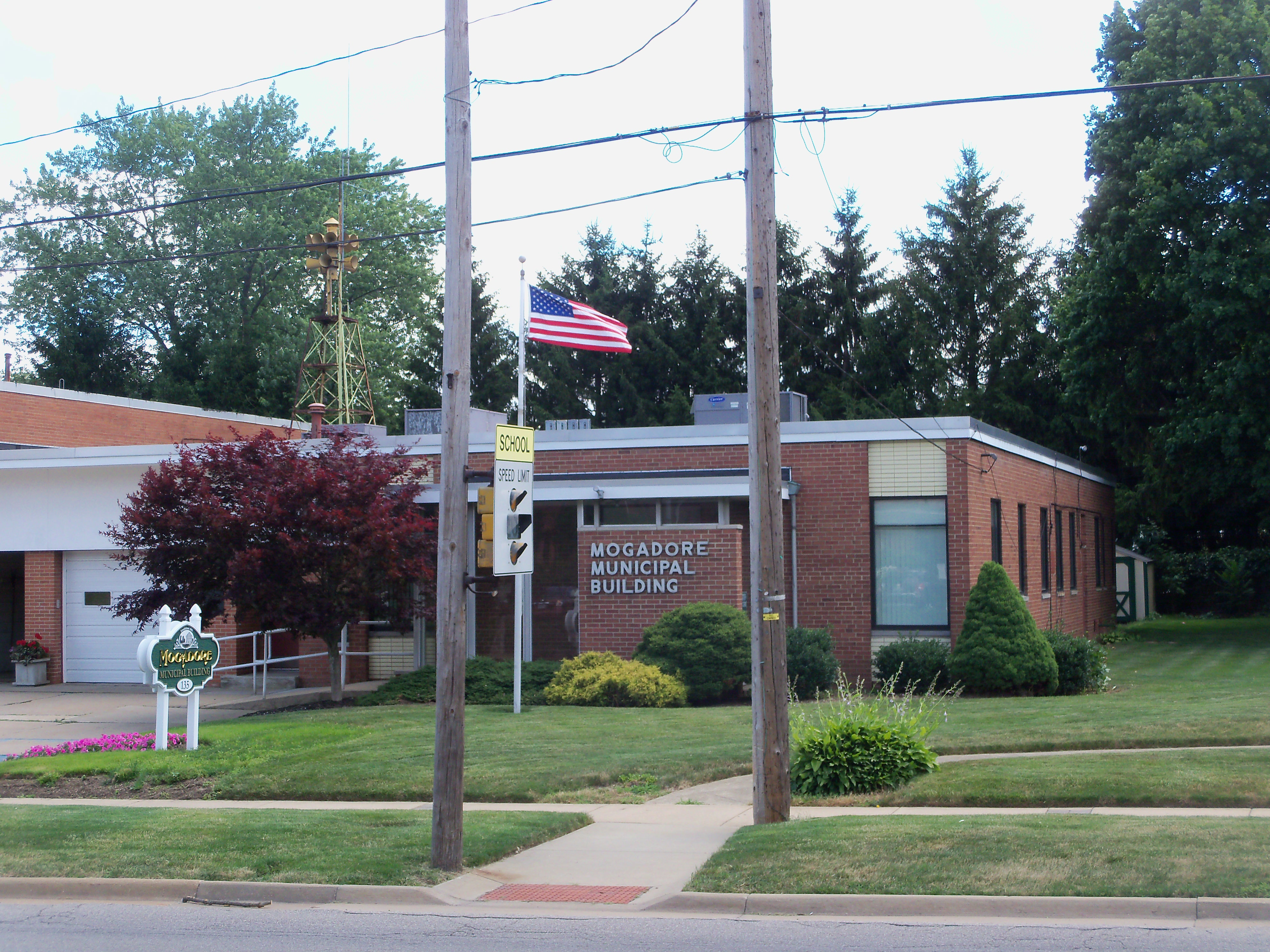
Mogadore Municipal Building

Mogadore is governed by a mayor and a 7-member council, all of whom are elected at-large to four-year terms. The village also elects a clerk-treasurer to handle the finances of the village. All the elections are nonpartisan.

== Education ==
Mogadore Local School District operates one elementary school, one middle school, and Mogadore High School.

Mogadore has a public library, a branch of the Akron-Summit County Public Library.

== Notable people ==
- Kim Kreiner, athlete

== See also ==
- List of U.S. cities in multiple counties
