= Crestwood Local School District =

Public school district in Ohio, USA

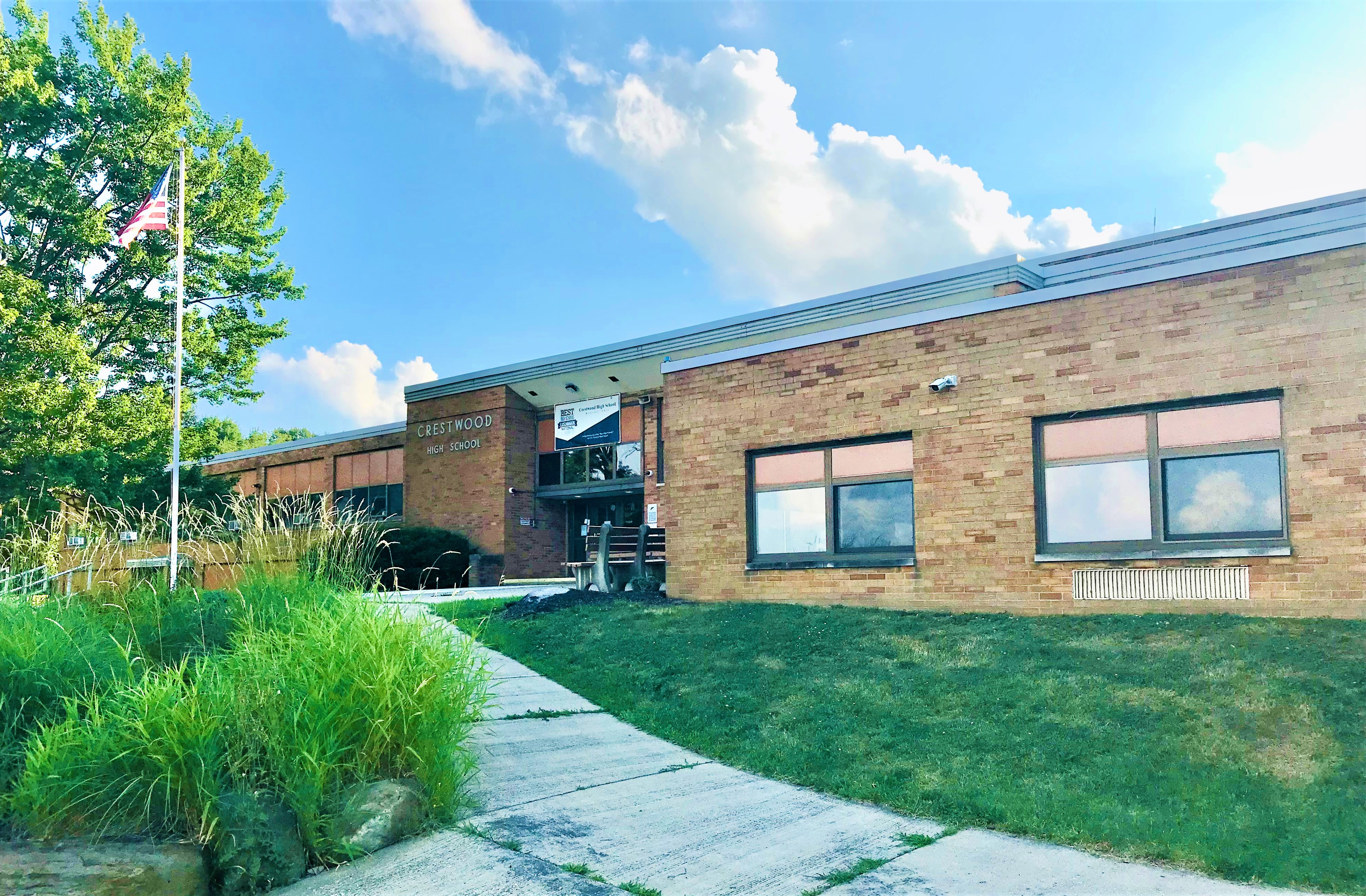
- Front entrance of the high school

Address
- 10880 John Edward Dr Mantua, Ohio, 44255; United States

District information
- Type: Public
- Grades: PK–12
- NCES District ID: 3904918

Students and staff
- Enrollment: 1,285 (2024-25)
- Staff: 91.00 (FTE)
- Student–teacher ratio: 14.12
- District mascot: Red Devils
- Colors: Red and gray

Other information
- Website: www.crestwoodschools.org

The Crestwood Local School District is a public school district based in Mantua, Ohio, United States. The school district consists of one high school and two elementary schools. The district covers the villages of Mantua and Hiram, all of Mantua and Shalersville Townships, and much of Hiram Township.

== History ==
The Crestwood Local School District officially formed in 1951, when the Mantua Local School District, which had formed just three years earlier in 1948 when the Mantua Township and Mantua Village districts merged, consolidated with the Shalersville Township Schools to create what was initially known as the Mantua–Shalersville Local School District. Three years later in 1955, the school board voted to rename the district Crestwood, after the telephone exchange that was used in the area at the time ("Crestwood 4" or 2-7-4). Crestwood High School opened in 1956, replacing Mantua Village School as the high school.

Less than 10 years later in 1964, the Hiram Local School District was added to the district, though several families in the eastern part of Hiram Township petitioned to be added to the adjacent James A. Garfield Local School District. The addition of Hiram expanded the district to its current size, which covers an area of roughly 75 square miles (190 km^{2}) including the villages of Mantua and Hiram, all of Mantua and Shalersville townships, and most of Hiram Township.

After the consolidations and new buildings, the Mantua Village School, Mantua Center School, Shalersville School, and Hiram School remained in use as elementary schools. In the early 2000s, the district replaced these schools with two consolidated facilities. The new buildings were funded by the Ohio School Facilities Commission and a successful voter bond issue. The new buildings, Crestwood Primary School for grades Pre-K–3 and Crestwood Intermediate School for grades 4–6, opened in August 2004. After the new buildings were completed Shalersville and Mantua Center Schools were purchased by their respective township governments, while the district sold the Mantua Village and Hiram Schools. Mantua Village School was purchased by University Hospitals and converted into the UH Mantua Health Center. Hiram School was purchased by a private owner, but fell into disuse and was razed in 2010.

Crestwood Middle School closed following the 2020–21 school year. Grades 7 and 8 were moved to Crestwood High School while grade 6 was sent to Crestwood Intermediate School.

== Schools ==
=== High school ===
- Crestwood High School

=== Elementary schools ===
- Crestwood Intermediate School
- Crestwood Primary School

=== Former schools ===
- Crestwood Middle School
- Hiram School
- Mantua Center School
- Mantua Village School
- Shalersville School
