= Mantua Center School =

- U.S. National Register of Historic Places
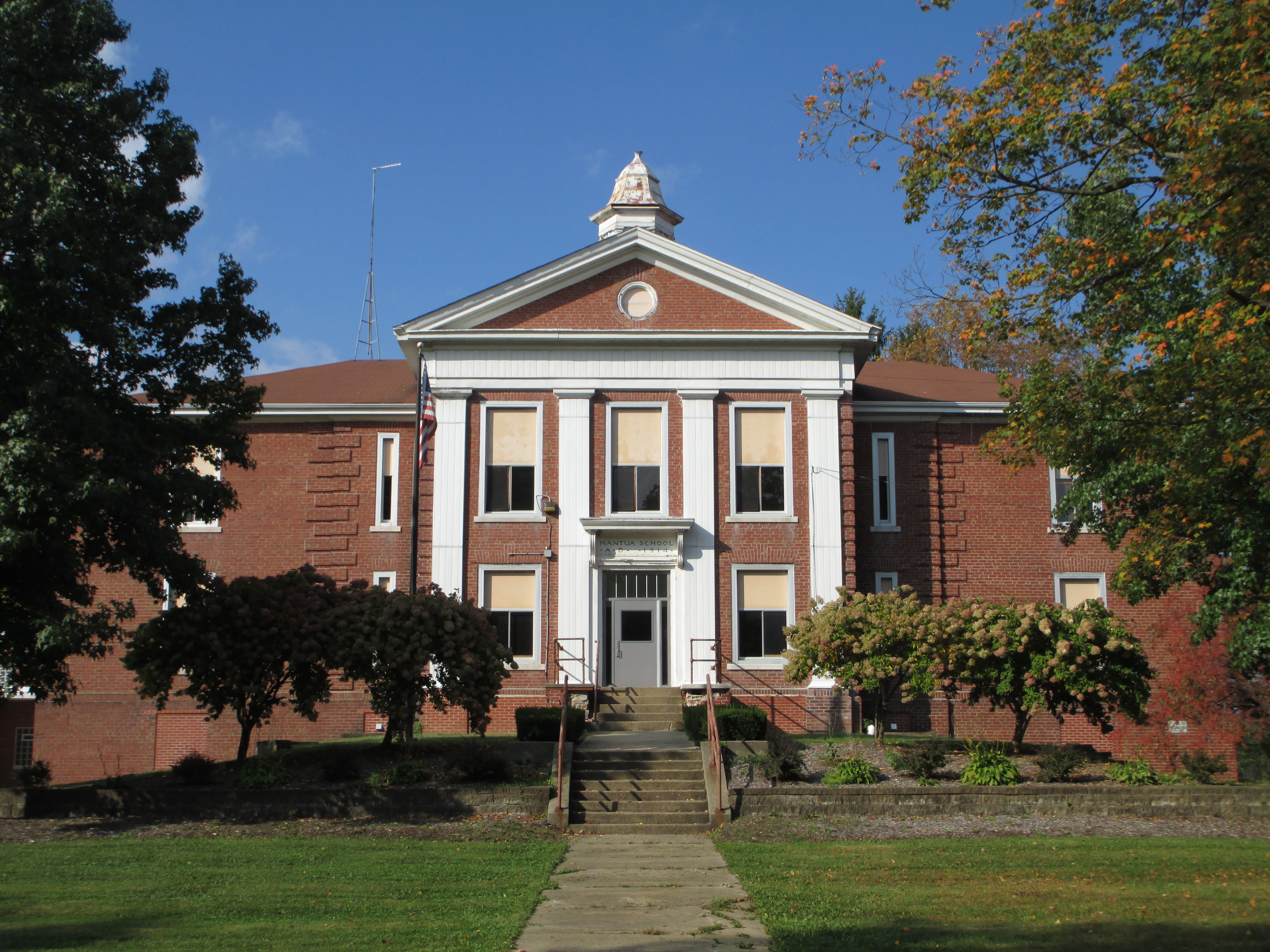
- Front in October 2013

- Location within Ohio Location within the United States
- Location: 11741 Mantua Center Rd., Mantua, Ohio
- Coordinates: 41°18′41″N 81°14′42″W
- Built: 1914
- Architect: Paul T. Cahill
- Architectural style: Neoclassical
- NRHP reference No.: 13000682
- Added to NRHP: September 4, 2013

Mantua Center School is a historic building located in the Mantua Center area of Mantua Township, Portage County, Ohio, United States. It was built in 1914 and listed on the National Register of Historic Places on September 4, 2013. The building was listed as an example of early 20th century educational and Neoclassical architecture in rural Portage County and one of the few remaining buildings from that era still standing.

Until 2004, the building was in use as a school, known as Mantua Center Elementary School. It housed grades kindergarten through four as one of four elementary schools in the Crestwood Local School District. Previously, the building had served first as a grades 1–12 school for students in Mantua Township, known as the Mantua Township School, and after 1948 as a school for grades 1–7 following consolidation of the Mantua Township and Mantua Village school districts. It continued as a 1–7 building until the late 1950s when Crestwood Middle School opened. An addition with a multi-purpose gymnasium and stage was completed in 1964.

Following the conclusion of the 2003–04 school year in June, the building was closed and sold to the Mantua Township Trustees. It, along with three other elementary schools in the district, was replaced by two new consolidated elementary schools, one for grades K–2 and the other for grades 3–5. Since then, the newer portion of the building has functioned as a community center while the original building has limited use for office space by the township government.

== History ==
During the early days of public education in Ohio, schools were divided into several small districts centered on a one-room schoolhouse. In the late 19th century, a movement started to centralize these schools into a single building with students divided into grade levels. The first school district to centralize in Portage County was Ravenna City in 1859 followed by Kent nine years later. Many of the more rural township schools, however, did not start centralizing schools until the early 20th century. Mantua Township centralized schools in 1903, housing students in buildings in and around what is now the Mantua Center District.

The construction of the Mantua Center School was driven mainly by township residents' desire for modern and safe educational facilities, to replace the wooden frame buildings that had previously been serving as schools. The deadly Collinwood school fire in 1908, which occurred nearby in what is now part of Cleveland and killed 172 students, and prevention of the spread of cholera were two of the primary reasons. The construction of the building also occurred during a period of time where other districts were opening new centralized buildings. Between 1913 and 1920, 21 new centralized schools were built in Portage County.

The new school building opened in October 1914 and students simply gathered their belongings in the previous buildings and carried them to the new school across the street one block north. The school became a social center for the community similar to other centralized schools. Initially it housed all grades (1–12) with high school classes occupying three classrooms and the remaining grades in four rooms. The school housed students in all grades until 1948, when the Mantua Village School District was merged with the township district to form the Mantua Local School District. Under the consolidated district, high school students (grades 8–12) attended the Mantua Village School while elementary students (grades 1–7) attended Mantua Center School. Two additional classrooms were added to the Mantua Center School by converting space in an adjacent building on the property. This arrangement continued even after Shalersville Township joined the district in 1952 to form the Mantua–Shalersville Local School District. Continued enrollment growth in the 1950s resulted in construction of a new high school in Mantua Village in 1956, at which point the district was renamed for the local phone exchange, Crestwood. A few years later, a new junior high school was built near the high school and Mantua Center School was used as an elementary school for grades K–4. An addition was built in 1964 that included a multi-purpose gymnasium and classrooms.

The K–4 setup continued until 2004 when two new consolidated elementary schools, Crestwood Primary for grades K–2 and Crestwood Intermediate for grades 3–5, were completed in Mantua Township just north of the high school and middle school campus. An evaluation of the district's buildings in the 1990s by the Ohio School Facilities Commission recommended replacing the four aging elementary schools, all of which had previously served as centralized schools, rather than spend millions of dollars to bring each one up to code. Voters approved the bond issue to build the new schools in the early 2000s. Mantua Center School was sold to the Mantua Township Trustees for $147,500. Since purchasing the building, the 1964 addition has been used for various community events and meetings while the Mantua Township trustees use some of the original 1914 building for offices.

== Architecture ==
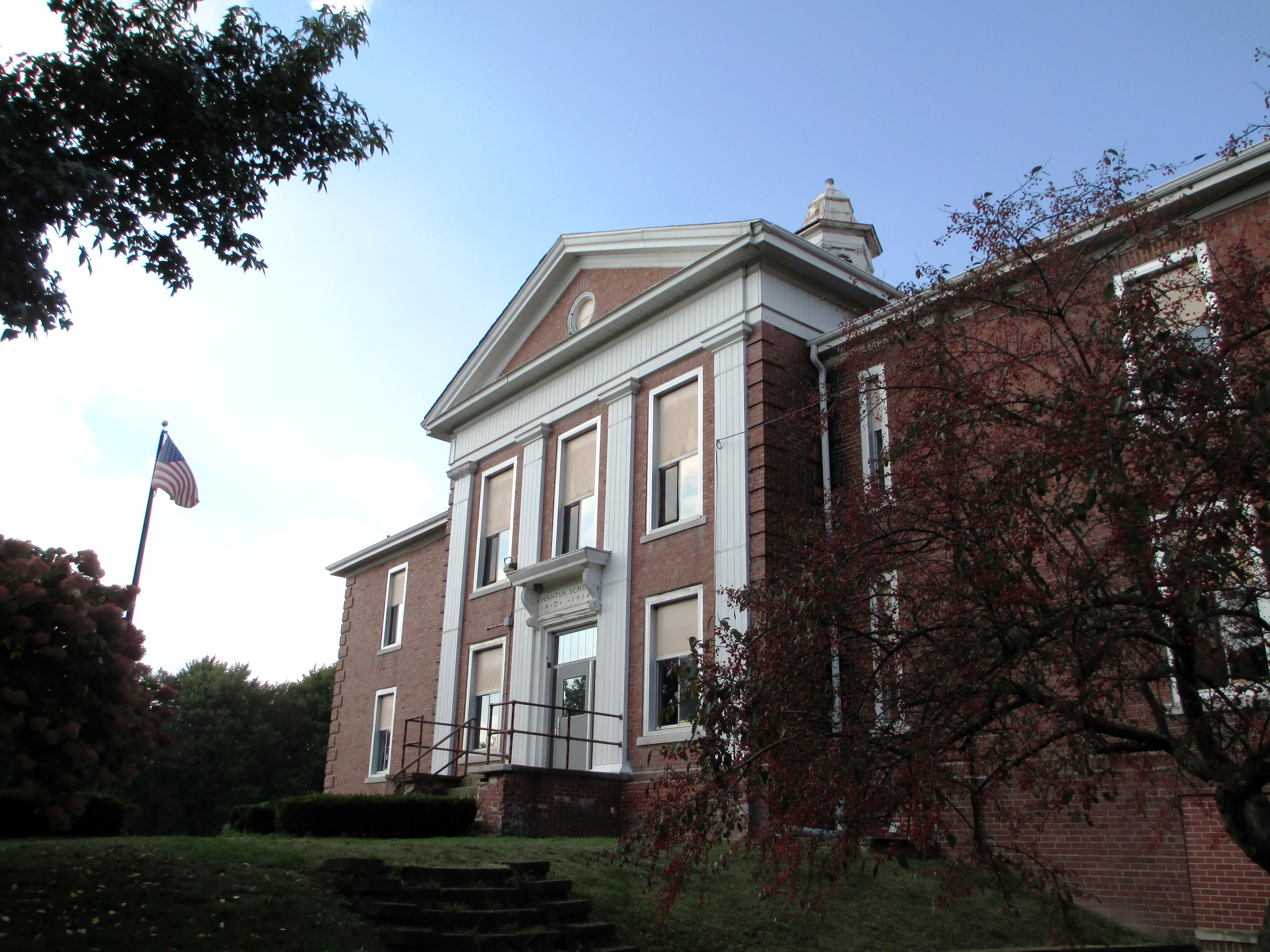
Front view of the original building in late 2013

The original 1914 Mantua Center School is an example of Neoclassical architecture, prominent in the United States during the early 20th century. The building was designed by architect Peter T. Cahill, who was based in Cleveland at the time, and the general contractor was Loomis, Seymour, and Company. The original building cost $32,500 ($1,045,000 in 2025 dollars) and had 12,000 square feet (1,100 m^{2}) of space on three levels with seven classrooms on the top two floors and small gymnasium and cafeteria areas on the lowest levels. The building also contained indoor restrooms, located in the basement, which were unusual for rural buildings in the early 20th century.

Architect Peter Cahill was a graduate of nearby Hiram College in 1911 and had previously designed the school for neighboring Hiram Township, which opened in 1913. In March 1913, Cahill authored an article in The Ohio Architect, Engineer and Builder urging the state to develop building codes that would prohibit construction of school buildings using wood since wood was far more prone to damage from floods and fire. Cahill was a proponent of masonry construction and cement walls and had observed the extensive damage caused to buildings as a result of the Great Flood of 1913, which occurred in late March of that year, while the disastrous Collinwood school fire of 1908 was still a recent memory.

Cahill's choice for the design of Mantua Center School may have been influenced by the original facade of the Old Main building at Hiram College, which had been remodeled by the 1880s and has since been demolished. The classical designs of the nearby buildings that now constitute the Mantua Center District may have also been influences on his design, which includes elements of Georgian and Greek Revival architecture. The 1964 addition was built using a flat-roofed minimalist style prominent in educational architecture in the mid-20th century. The addition includes a multi-purpose gymnasium, kitchen, restrooms and storage.

== Historic listing ==
The Mantua Center School was nominated for inclusion on the National Register of Historic Places under Criteria A and C. The building is significant in the area of Community Planning and Development in Criterion A as it is one of the early, and few remaining, examples in Portage County of a centralized rural school, from an era when most of the rural schools districts in the area and state transitioned from multiple school houses to central buildings. Between 1913 and 1920, 21 new centralized schools were built in the county, though only five of those schools are still standing and none are used for classes. Four of those buildings, including the Mantua Center School, have been re-purposed, one is abandoned, while the remaining buildings have since been demolished. The building was nominated under the Architecture area of Criterion C as an example of an early 20th century Neoclassical educational facility.

== See also ==
- National Register of Historic Places listings in Portage County, Ohio
