= Crestwood High School (Ohio) =

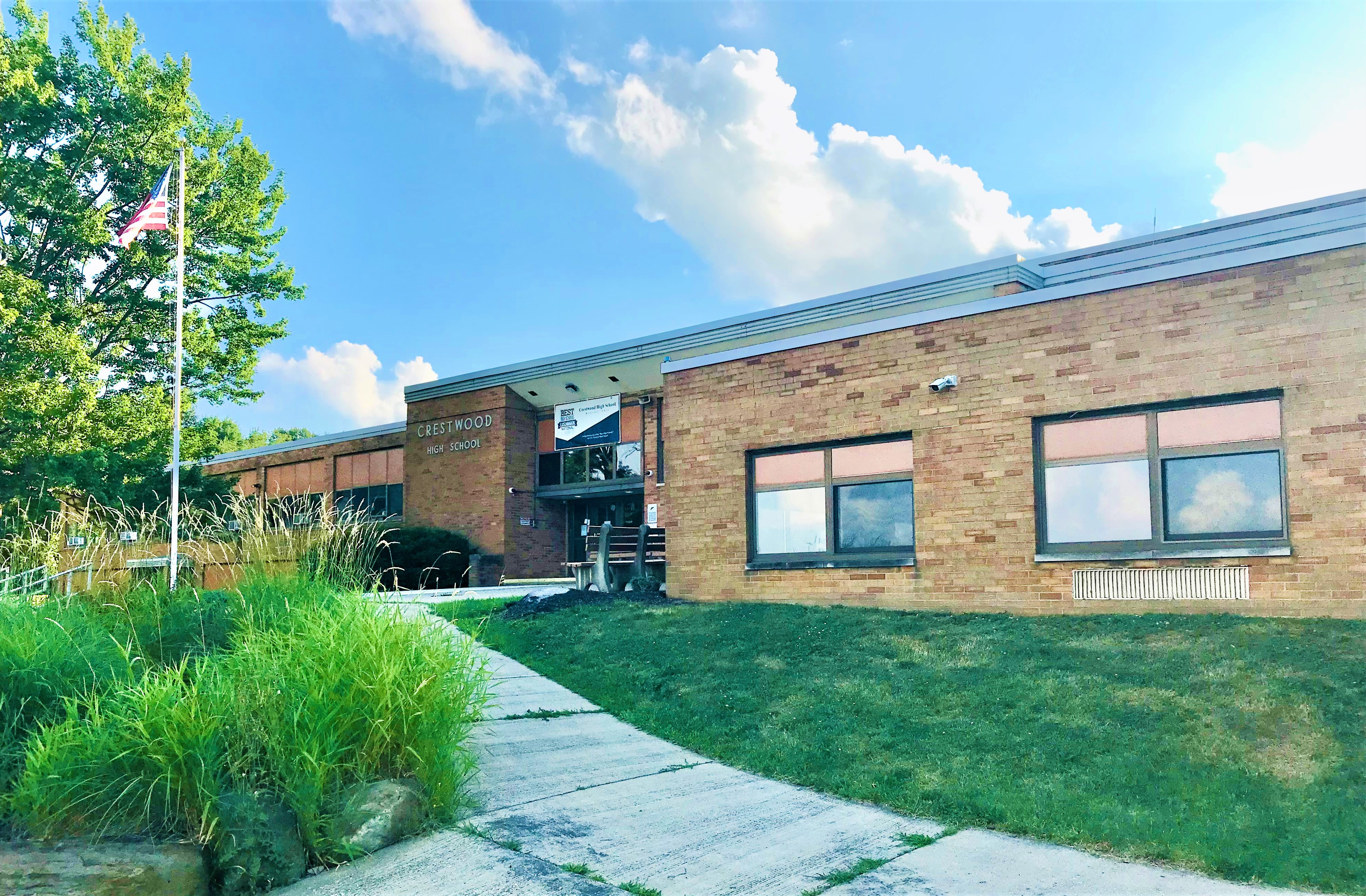
- Front Entrance

Location
- 10919 Main Street; Mantua, Ohio 44255; United States
- Coordinates: 41°17′20″N 81°13′35″W

Information
- Funding type: Public
- School district: Crestwood Local School District
- Principal: Dave McMahon
- Staff: 40.00 (FTE)
- Grades: 7–12
- Enrollment: 591 (2023–2024)
- Student to teacher ratio: 14.48
- Colors: Red and gray
- Athletics conference: Chagrin Valley Conference; Valley Division
- Team name: Red Devils
- Communities served: Mantua, Hiram, Mantua Township, Hiram Township, Shalersville Township
- Website: chs.crestwoodschools.org

Crestwood High School is a public high school in Mantua, Ohio, United States. It is the only high school in the Crestwood Local School District and since the 2021–22 school year serves students in grades 7 through 12. Their athletic teams are known as the Red Devils.

== Athletics ==
=== State championships ===
- Boys wrestling – 1976
- Girls track and field – 2006
- Girls softball – 2003

== Notable alumni ==
- Bridget Franek (Class of 2006), Olympic athlete in middle-distance running
- Jack Lambert, professional football player in the National Football League (NFL) and member of the Pro Football Hall of Fame
