= James A. Garfield Local School District =

Public school district in Portage County, Ohio

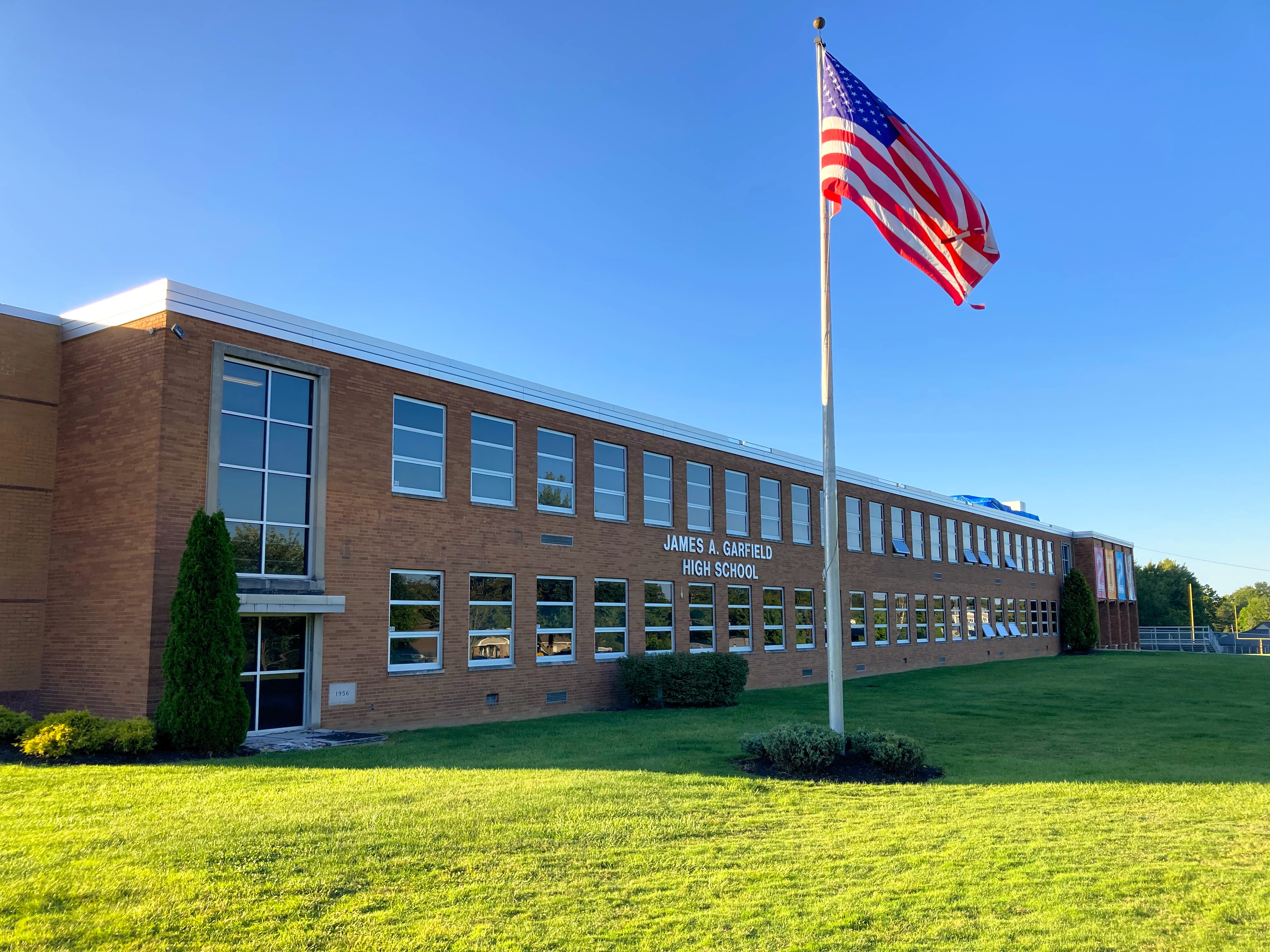
- James A. Garfield High School

Address
- 10235 State Route 88 Garrettsville, Ohio, 44231; United States

District information
- Type: Public
- Grades: PK–12
- Established: 1951
- NCES District ID: 3904920

Students and staff
- Enrollment: 367 (2023–24)
- Staff: 70 (FTE)
- Student–teacher ratio: 16.93
- District mascot: G-Men
- Colors: Black and gold

Other information
- Website: jagschools.org/o/jag-high-school

The James A. Garfield Local School District is a public school district based in Garrettsville, Ohio, United States. The school district consists of one high school, one middle school and one elementary school and serves students in Garrettsville, all of Freedom and Nelson townships, and the eastern portion of Hiram Township. All schools, athletic fields, and the district offices are located on a central campus in southern Garrettsville.

== History ==
The James A. Garfield Local School District formed in 1951 with the consolidation of the Freedom Township and Garrettsville school districts. Three years earlier, in 1948, Garrettsville and Nelson Township schools had merged. A portion of eastern Hiram Township was added to the district in 1964 when the Hiram district merged with the neighboring Crestwood Local School District and several families petitioned to join the Garfield district instead. The school district is named after James A. Garfield, who served as the 20th United States President and had lived in the area during the mid-19th century, first as a student and later as an instructor and principal at what is now Hiram College.

Initially, the high school was housed in the former Garrettsville School. The current high school along Ohio State Route 88 opened in 1956, followed by a separate elementary school on the high school campus that opened in 1969. A bond issue approved in 1998 saw construction of a new middle school for grades 7 and 8 attached to the high school, while the former Garrettsville School became James A. Garfield Intermediate School for grades 5 and 6. The intermediate school was closed in 2015 following the completion of a 17,000 square feet (1,600 m^{2}) addition to the elementary school, with grade 5 going to the elementary school and grade 6 to the middle school buildings. Additional renovations were undertaken in the 2020s to update classrooms, athletic fields, and support programs, including a new all-weather track and field complex that was dedicated in 2025.

== Schools ==
=== High school ===
- James A. Garfield High School, grades 9–12

=== Middle school ===
- James A. Garfield Middle School, grades 6–8

=== Elementary school ===
- James A. Garfield Elementary School, grades K–5
