= Mantua Bog State Nature Preserve =

Nature reserve in Ohio, United States

- Location within Ohio Location within the United States
- Location: Mantua Township, Portage County, Ohio
- Nearest city: Mantua
- Coordinates: 41°16′49″N 81°12′41″W
- Area: 104.8 ha (259 acres)

U.S. National Natural Landmark
- Designated: 1976

The Mantua Bog State Nature Preserve (or Mantua Swamp) is a 104.8-acre (42.4 ha) protected wetland in Mantua Township, Portage County in the U.S. state of Ohio. It was designated a National Natural Landmark in 1976 and a state nature preserve in 1990. The national landmark designation encompasses 285 acres (115 ha) which includes Marsh Wetlands State Nature Preserve, in addition to Mantua Bog State Nature Preserve.

The nature preserve includes different types of wetlands including swamp forest, boreal bog, and cattail marshes. Twenty-four state-listed plants have been identified in the bog including autumn willow (Salix serissima), bunchflower (Melanthium virginicum), and cranberry (Vaccinium oxycoccos). In 2000, the Ohio Odonata Survey found a breeding population of the brush-tipped emerald dragonfly (Somatochlora walshii), a species not previously known to exist in Ohio.

Access is by permit only (from the Division of Natural Areas and Preserves) due to the sensitivity of the wetland.
