= James A. Garfield High School (Garrettsville, Ohio) =

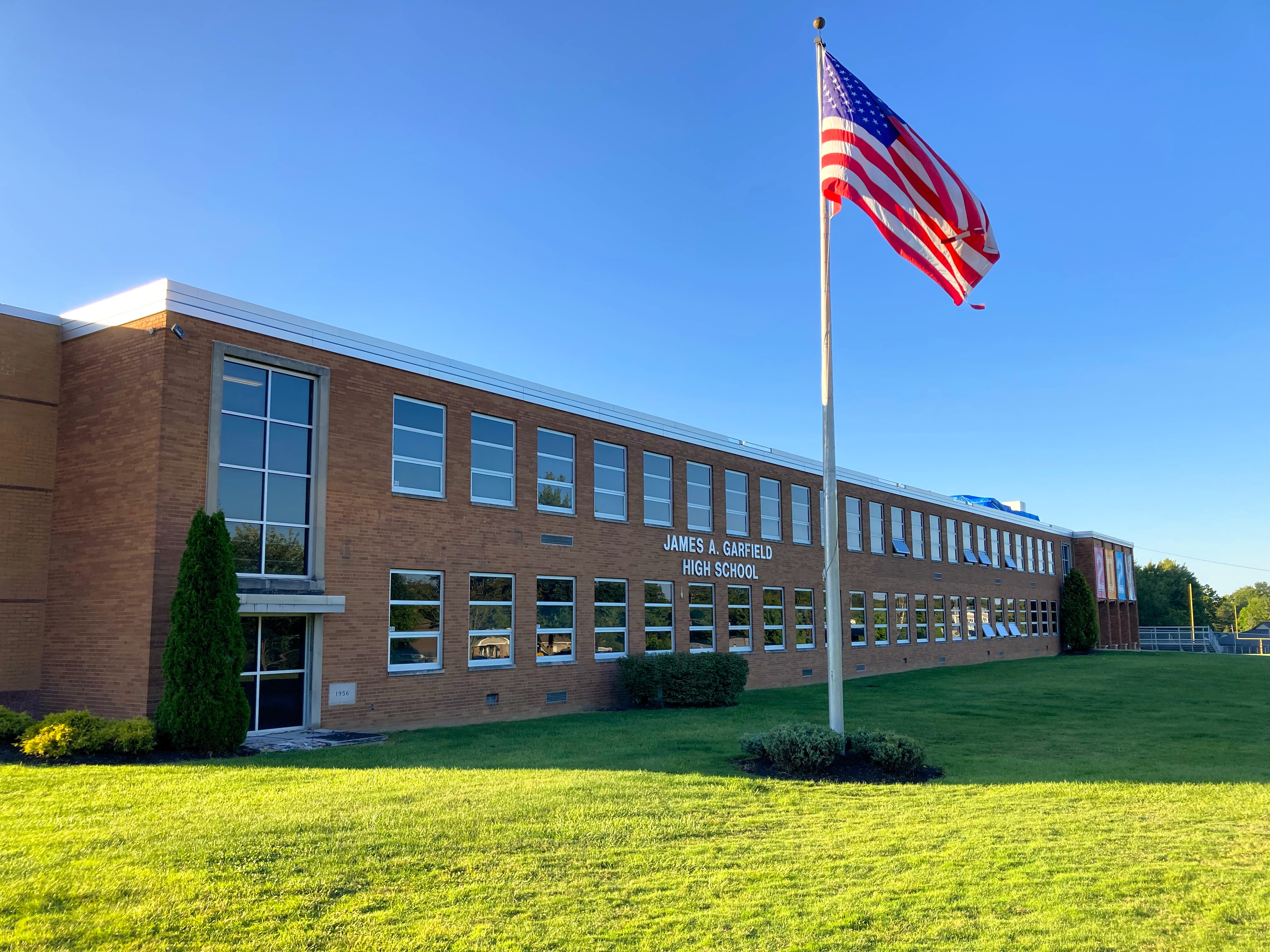

Location
- 10233 State Route 88; Garrettsville, Ohio 44231; United States; 41°16′16″N 81°6′5″W

Information
- School type: Public, secondary school
- School district: James A. Garfield Local School District
- Principal: Kathleen Kisabeth
- Staff: 20.84 (FTE)
- Grades: 9–12
- Enrollment: 362 (2024–2025)
- Student to teacher ratio: 17.37
- Colors: Black & Gold
- Athletics conference: Mahoning Valley Athletic Conference
- Team name: G-Men
- Communities served: Garrettsville, Freedom Township, Hiram Township, Nelson Township
- Website: jagschools.org/o/jag-high-school

James A. Garfield High School is a public high school in Garrettsville, Ohio, United States. It is the only high school in the James A. Garfield Local School District. Their mascot is the G-Men. The name the G-Men came from the investigation by the Federal Government officers nicknamed the G-Men. The investigation was for the $30,000 train robbery of 1935 by Alvin Karpis in Garrettsville.

The school district is named after the 20th President of the United States, James A. Garfield.

== Notable alumni ==
- Kathleen Clyde, representative for the Ohio House of Representatives 68th district since 2011
- Jeff Richmond, television producer and writer for Saturday Night Live and 30 Rock
