= Bridget Franek =

American middle-distance runner

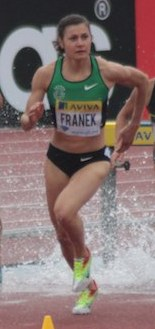
- Bridget Franek in 2012

Personal information
- Born: November 8, 1987 (age 38)
- Height: 5 ft 6 in (168 cm)

Sport
- Country: United States
- Event: 3000m Steeplechase
- College team: Penn State
- Club: OTC Elite

Achievements and titles
- Personal best: 3000 m Steeplechase: 9:29.53

Bridget Franek (born November 8, 1987, in Cleveland) is an American middle distance runner who was in the U.S. Olympic team for the 2012 Summer Olympics in the 3000 meter steeplechase.

== Early life ==
Franek is the child of parents Tom and Rosalie, who were runners in high school and college. Franek grew up in Hiram Township and graduated from Crestwood High School in Mantua, Ohio, in 2006.

== College career ==
Franek graduated in 2010 from Penn State University and graduated in 2014 from University of Oregon Sports Marketing MBA. She was the Big Ten Freshman of the Year in 2007. She was the bronze medalist in the NCAA outdoor steeplechase championship in 2008 with a time of 9:58.74. She was the NCAA outdoor steeplechase champion in 2010 with a time of 9:38.86.

== Post-college career ==
Franek was the runner-up for the U.S. outdoor steeplechase title in 2011 and 2012. She qualified for the 2012 Summer Olympics by placing second at the U.S. Olympic trials in the 3000 meter steeplechase with a time of 9:35.62. In her Olympic heat, she placed fifth with a time of 9:29.86. She advanced to the final based on time qualification. In the Olympic final she finished 14th. Franek was the first place woman at the 2015 Warrior Dash World Championship obstacle race in October 2015 and she received a $30,000 prize.

=== USA National Championships ===
==== Track and field ====
Year	Competition	Venue	Position	Event	Notes
2007	USA Outdoor Track and Field Championships	Indianapolis, Indiana	10th	3000 m s'chase	10:10.36
2008	USA Outdoor Track and Field Championships	Eugene, Oregon	16th	3000 m s'chase	10:11.56
2009	USA Outdoor Track and Field Championships	Eugene, Oregon	3rd	3000 m s'chase	9:36.74
2010	USA Outdoor Track and Field Championships	Eugene, Oregon	DNS	5000 metres	DNS
2010	USA Outdoor Track and Field Championships	Eugene, Oregon	5th	3000 m s'chase	10:07.49
2011	USA Outdoor Track and Field Championships	Eugene, Oregon	2nd	3000 m s'chase	9:44.90
2012	USA Outdoor Track and Field Championships	Eugene, Oregon	2nd	3000 m s'chase	9:35.62
2013	USA Outdoor Track and Field Championships	Des Moines, Iowa	10th	3000 m s'chase	10:17.41
2014	USA Outdoor Track and Field Championships	Sacramento, California	14th	3000 m s'chase	DNF
2015	USA Outdoor Track and Field Championships	Eugene, Oregon	8th	3000 m s'chase	9:47.81

== See also ==
- List of Pennsylvania State University Olympians
