= Mantua Township =

Mantua Township could be referring to:

- Mantua Township, New Jersey
- Mantua Township, Portage County, Ohio
