= Brent Simon =

- Born: June 6, 1978 (age 47)
- Origin: Mantua, Ohio, United States
- Genres: Outsider Music; Synthpop; Experimental music
- Occupation: Singer-songwriter
- Instrument(s): Vocals; Keyboard
- Years active: 2005–present
- Website: www.nerdpunk.com

Brent Simon (born June 6, 1978) is a keyboard player best known for his videos "The Bittorrent Song" and "Space Camp". He achieved popularity due to his unique melodies and lyrics. There is a documentary titled Brentumentary that explores an average day in Simon's life. Brentumentary features him playing Space Camp and The Bittorrent song. Simon has been featured on G4 several times, the Thisisaknife web show, and on Jimmy Kimmel Live!. Brent works in Mantua, Ohio, at his family's local grocery store.

== Discography ==
- Brentumentary Soundtrack (2005)
- Project: Coldfire (2005) (EP)
- Seven of Nine (2006)
