= Old Grandma Hardcore =

American video game blogger

Barbara St. Hilaire, better known as Old Grandma Hardcore, is an American video gamer and blogger from Mantua, Ohio, who became known for her keen interest in video games, considered to be unusual due to her age. She has said she plays for about 10 hours per day.

St. Hilaire ran a blog named "Old Grandma Hardcore", started by her grandson Timothy, where she shared videos, thoughts about various games, and life updates. She is known for constantly swearing while playing games.

In December 2005, when St. Hilaire was 69, she was hired as MTV's "senior" video game correspondent and host for the show The G-Hole. In 2006, St. Hilaire won the Nintendo World Store's "Coolest Grandparent of the Year" Brain Age contest. In August 2006 she was featured on Attack of the Show covering "Women and Gaming".

St. Hilaire produced new videos into the early 2010s, though they became more sporadic over time.
