= Portage County Regional Airport =

Public use airport near Ravenna, Ohio

Portage Regional County Airport Portage County Regional Airport
- IATA: none; ICAO: KPOV; FAA LID: POV

Summary
- Airport type: Public
- Owner/Operator: Portage County Commissioners
- Serves: Ravenna, Ohio
- Location: Shalersville Township
- Time zone: UTC−05:00 (-5)
  - Summer (DST): UTC−04:00 (-4)
- Elevation AMSL: 1,198 ft (365 m)
- Coordinates: 41°12′37″N 081°15′06″W

Map
- Location of airport in Ohio POV (the United States)

Runways
Direction	Length		Surface
Direction	ft	m	Surface
9/27	3,499	1,066	Asphalt

Statistics (2022)
- Aircraft operations: 18, 624
- Based aircraft: 68
- Source: Federal Aviation Administration

Portage County Airport (ICAO: KPOV, FAA LID: POV, formerly 29G), also known as Portage County Regional Airport, is a public use airport in Portage County, Ohio, United States. It is owned by the Portage County Board of Commissioners and located three nautical miles (6 km) north of Ravenna, in Shalersville Township. This airport is included in the National Plan of Integrated Airport Systems for 2011–2015, which categorized it as a general aviation facility.

This airport is assigned a three-letter location identifier of POV by the Federal Aviation Administration, but it does not have an International Air Transport Association (IATA) airport code (the IATA assigned POV to Prešov Airport in Slovakia). The airport's former FAA identifier was 29G.

The airport is used by the National Guard to train helicopter pilots. Private flight instruction also uses the airport, and Kent State University often sends aircraft. Several flying clubs also operate at the airport.

== History ==
After initially being rejected due to unsuitability, a 4,600-by-400-foot (1,400 by 120 m) parcel was acquired for a new county airport in a land swap in August 1966. The runway had been completed by late November 1968. Following construction delays due to underground springs, the airport was dedicated in October 1971.

In 1999, it signed a 50-year airport management and fixed-base operator agreement with the Portage Flight Center.

In 2023, the Portage County Regional Airport Authority was dissolved, and the airport was taken over by the Portage County Commissioners. The move was in response to mounting debt and disrepair at the airport. In September 2025, the airport received an FAA grant to reconstruct and move taxiways.

== Facilities and aircraft ==
Portage County Airport covers an area of 224 acres (91 ha) at an elevation of 1,198 feet (365 m) above mean sea level. It has one runway designated 9/27 with an asphalt surface measuring 3,499 by 75 feet (1,066 x 23 m).

The airport repaved its runway in 2016 and 2017. The project cost over $830,000 and had support from the Federal Aviation Administration.

A restaurant opened at the airport in 2018 with the goal of attracting more pilots, and fuel sales, to the airport. The bagel shop closed in February 2024.

The airport has a fixed-base operator that sells fuel. It also offers services such as aircraft maintenance and hangaring as well as amenities such as conference rooms, pilot supplies, a crew lounge, and more.

For the 12-month period ending September 15, 2022, the airport had 18,624 aircraft operations, an average of 51 per day: 99% general aviation, <1% air taxi, and <1% military. At that time there were 68 aircraft based at this airport: 60 single-engine, 5 multi-engine, 2 helicopter, and 1 glider.

== Accidents and incidents ==
- On November 24, 1993, a Piper PA-28 Turbo Arrow collided with trees and a paint shop hangar at the Portage County Airport. The aircraft was flying under instrument flight rules to the Wright-Patterson Air Force Base, where the aircraft was based. The plane's flights from the Air Force Base to the Ohio State University Airport and on to Portage were uneventful, though the pilots noticed that they held a slight turn if they leveled the plane according to the aircraft's attitude indicator. At Portage County, the Piper was cleared for departure normally but crashed soon after. Witnesses reported hearing a low-flying aircraft followed by a crash impact. The probable cause of the accident was found to be the pilot's decision to fly the airplane with known deficiencies in the attitude indicator, leading to spatial disorientation during his departure climb. Contributing factors were low cloud ceilings and night conditions.
- On December 8, 2001, a Cessna 172M Skyhawk was substantially damaged while attempting a takeoff from the Portage County Airport. The student pilot onboard was flying solo to practice takeoffs and landings. As the plane rotated, the pilot noted it was not aligned with the runway, and he used more right rudder than needed to compensate. He subsequently used excessive left rudder to correct his mistake. The plane settled back to the runway and went into the grassy median next to the runway. Once the plane went into the grass, the student pulled the throttle to idle. The plane collided with a ditch; its nose wheel broke off and its propeller was damaged. The probable cause of the accident was found to be the student pilot's failure to maintain directional control.
- On July 30, 2002, a Cessna 182Q Skylane was substantially damaged during a landing at Portage County Airport. When the airplane was over the approach end of the runway, the pilot began his flare. The stall warning horn "chirped" briefly, and the pilot heard the sound of the main landing gear contacting the runway. He maintained back pressure on the yoke to bleed off airspeed. When the nose wheel contacted the runway, the airplane made an immediate sharp turn to the left. The pilot attempted to bring the aircraft back to the centerline using full right rudder and right brake; however, the airplane did not respond, and it veered off the left side of the runway. The plane rolled over a grassy median, struck the nearby taxiway, and became airborne. It landed hard again on the other side of the taxiway, and all three wheels hit the runway; the nose wheel broke off, the airplane's nose struck the ground, the aircraft nosed over. The reason for the pilot's loss of directional control could not be determined.
- On January 14, 2004, a Cessna 421 Golden Eagle was substantially damaged while landing at the Portage County Airport. The pilot encountered icing conditions while flying in and out of clouds while en route to Ravenna. The airplane descended out of the clouds and a visual approach to Ravenna was performed; however, a layer of ice had accumulated on the windshield. The pilot flew three approaches to the runway, attempting to "line up with the final," as well as clear ice off the windshield. During the third attempt, as the pilot flared to land, the co-pilot stated, "I have the flaps," and extended the flaps to the full position. Several seconds later, the airplane "stalled" at an altitude of 10 feet and touched down hard on the runway. The probable cause of the accident was found to be the pilot's failure to maintain airspeed, which resulted in an inadvertent stall and subsequent hard landing. A factor in the accident was degraded aircraft performance due to the airframe ice accumulation.
- On September 19, 2007, a Beechcraft Bonanza crashed after takeoff from the Portage County Airport. The aircraft's engine lost power after departure. All aboard walked away from the crash safely.
- On May 10, 2011, a Mooney M20 crashed while attempting to land at the Portage County Airport. Witnesses saw the aircraft flying low over the area near the airport when it clipped a tree and crashed. Officials said the aircraft had been trying to find the Portage County Airport for landing at the time of the crash, but the pilot instead landed in a field when he realized he wouldn't reach the airport. All onboard were flown to the hospital in critical condition.
- On June 11, 2017, a Cessna 172 Skyhawk crashed while landing on an instructional flight at the Portage County Airport. The flight instructor onboard reported that, while on short final, he told the student pilot to "pitch down" to maintain airspeed. The student did not respond, and the instructor again instructed the student to "pitch down now" while simultaneously pressing forward on the yoke. As the instructor pushed forward on the yoke, the student "pulled [back] with equal force on the yoke." Subsequently, the flight instructor pushed forward on the yoke "with greater force" than the previous attempt and stated "my plane" to the student, but "continued to wrestle the controls with the student." The airplane entered an aerodynamic stall and impacted the runway threshold hard. After the airplane impacted the runway threshold, the nose gear collapsed and the airplane veered off the runway to the right. The probable cause of the accident was found to be the flight instructor's failure to perform a go-around during final approach, which resulted in an aerodynamic stall and a hard landing; contributing to the accident was the flight instructor's failure to brief the student pilot on the positive transfer of aircraft control during preflight.
- On December 3, 2017, an amateur-built Titan Tornado II D aircraft crashed after takeoff from the Portage County Airport. A witness said he noticed the aircraft experience total loss of engine power while on approach to the airport. The airplane banked left and right and entered a nose-down descent consistent with an aerodynamic stall condition.
- A non-pilot-rated man plead guilty to taking a Bellanca Model 17 for flights several times between June 2019 and March 2021. The man had owned the Bellanca since 2010 and had previously held a pilot certificate. However, the certificate was suspended in 2014 and revoked in 2019 when the man landed a plane without the landing gear extended.

== See also ==
- List of airports in Ohio
