= Garrettsville, Ohio =

- Village
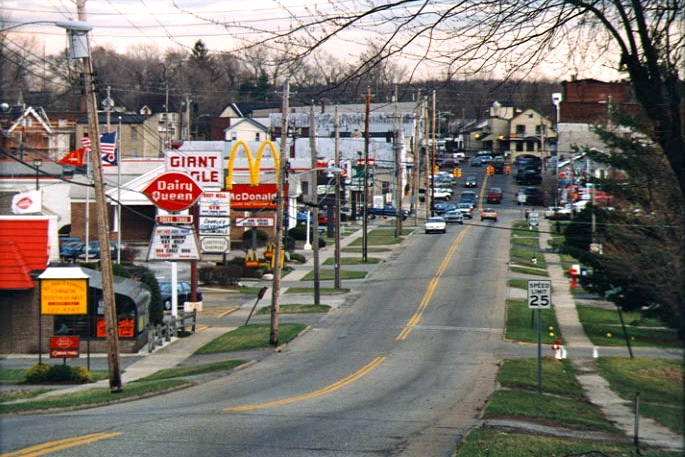
- Downtown Garrettsville in 1997
- Interactive map of Garrettsville, Ohio
- Location within Ohio Location within the United States
- Coordinates: 41°17′04″N 81°05′36″W
- Country: United States
- State: Ohio
- County: Portage

Area
  - Total: 2.56 sq mi (6.62 km^{2})
  - Land: 2.54 sq mi (6.58 km^{2})
  - Water: 0.015 sq mi (0.04 km^{2})
- Elevation: 1,001 ft (305 m)

Population (2020)
  - Total: 2,449
  - Estimate (2023): 2,463
  - Density: 964/sq mi (372.3/km^{2})
- Time zone: UTC-5 (Eastern (EST))
  - Summer (DST): UTC-4 (EDT)
- ZIP code: 44231
- Area codes: 330, 234
- FIPS code: 39-29442
- GNIS feature ID: 1086829
- Website: www.garrettsville.org

Garrettsville is a village in northeastern Portage County, Ohio, United States. The population was 2,449 at the 2020 census. It is part of the Akron metropolitan area. The village was formed from portions of Hiram, Nelson, Freedom, and Windham townships in the Connecticut Western Reserve.

== History ==
Colonel John Garrett III purchased 300 acres (120 ha) of land in Nelson Township, then part of Trumbull County, in 1803, the year Ohio became a state. The land was purchased for the price of $1,313, or about $4.40 per acre. In July of the following year, he settled on this land with his family and two slave girls, 6 and 10 years old. These settlers constructed a grist mill, which was to open in January 1806. Garrett, however, died that same month.

In 1806, the Cleveland-Pittsburgh Road was constructed near Garrett's mill. This improved commerce to the area, and nearby pioneers would mill their grain at the mill, eventually building roads and trails to meet with the Cleveland-Pittsburgh Road. In 1830, the Garrettsville Post Office was established. By 1864, residents in the area around the mill had built up a settlement, which was incorporated as a village on September 1, 1864.

Alvin Karpis robbed a train in Garrettsville in November 1935. Karpis was a member of the Barker-Karpis Gang, and was assisted in the robbery by gang member Harry Campbell and at least one other accomplice. Karpis and his gang stole $30,000, and obtained a private airplane to escape to Hot Springs, Arkansas. Karpis was eventually convicted of his crimes, and was imprisoned at Alcatraz longer than any other inmate.

On March 22, 2014, a large fire broke out downtown, burning approximately one city block and 13 businesses to the ground. The local fire department was assisted by 34 fire departments from surrounding communities. Despite the size of the fire nobody was seriously injured; although one Windham firefighter suffered from smoke inhalation. Rick Patrick is the current mayor of Garrettsville.

=== Maple syrup, Crane family ===
The Garrettsville-Hiram Chamber of Commerce reports that at the beginning of the 20th century, Garrettsville was the largest center in the world for the processing of maple syrup. This was due largely to the efforts of Arthur Crane, who canned this maple tree product at a cannery on Windham Street. Crane's son, Clarence Arthur (C.A.) Crane, grew up in Garrettsville. The younger Crane married Grace Edna Hart in the village on June 1, 1898. In 1899, Grace gave birth to Harold Hart Crane, who later became renowned as a poet.

Clarence Crane and his family left Garrettsville in the 1900s. Clarence continued to work in the maple sugar and candies industry, having started out in the industry working for his father. In 1912, Clarence Crane and his company, the Queen Victoria Chocolate Company, invented Life Savers candy.

== Geography ==
According to the United States Census Bureau, the village has a total area of 2.53 square miles (6.55 km^{2}), of which 2.51 square miles (6.50 km^{2}) is land and 0.02 square miles (0.05 km^{2}) is water.

== Demographics ==
Historical population
Census	Pop.	Note	%±
1870	658		—
1880	989		50.3%
1890	1,046		5.8%
1900	1,145		9.5%
1910	1,001		−12.6%
1920	1,119		11.8%
1930	1,179		5.4%
1940	1,264		7.2%
1950	1,504		19.0%
1960	1,662		10.5%
1970	1,718		3.4%
1980	1,769		3.0%
1990	2,014		13.8%
2000	2,262		12.3%
2010	2,325		2.8%
2020	2,449		5.3%
2023 (est.)	2,463	▲	0.6%
U.S. Decennial Census

=== 2010 census ===
As of the census of 2010, there were 2,325 people, 964 households, and 629 families living in the village. The population density was 926.3 inhabitants per square mile (357.6/km^{2}). There were 1,054 housing units at an average density of 419.9 per square mile (162.1/km^{2}). The racial makeup of the village was 97.8% White, 0.5% African American, 0.3% Asian, 0.3% from other races, and 1.0% from two or more races. Hispanic or Latino of any race were 0.9% of the population.

There were 964 households, of which 31.1% had children under the age of 18 living with them, 50.3% were married couples living together, 11.1% had a female householder with no husband present, 3.8% had a male householder with no wife present, and 34.8% were non-families. 28.7% of all households were made up of individuals, and 11.4% had someone living alone who was 65 years of age or older. The average household size was 2.41 and the average family size was 2.96.

The median age in the village was 41 years. 23.9% of residents were under the age of 18; 7.7% were between the ages of 18 and 24; 24% were from 25 to 44; 30.5% were from 45 to 64; and 13.8% were 65 years of age or older. The gender makeup of the village was 48.3% male and 51.7% female.

=== 2000 census ===
As of the census of 2000, there were 2,262 people, 930 households, and 619 families living in the village. The population density was 893.8 inhabitants per square mile (345.1/km^{2}). There were 976 housing units at an average density of 385.6 per square mile (148.9/km^{2}). The racial makeup of the village was 98.41% White, 0.27% African American, 0.18% Native American, 0.13% Asian, and 1.02% from two or more races. Hispanic or Latino of any race were 0.40% of the population.

There were 930 households, out of which 33.2% had children under the age of 18 living with them, 54.4% were married couples living together, 8.4% had a female householder with no husband present, and 33.4% were non-families. 29.4% of all households were made up of individuals, and 11.5% had someone living alone who was 65 years of age or older. The average household size was 2.43 and the average family size was 3.04.

In the village, the population was spread out, with 25.9% under the age of 18, 8.4% from 18 to 24, 31.4% from 25 to 44, 21.7% from 45 to 64, and 12.6% who were 65 years of age or older. The median age was 37 years. For every 100 females there were 91.7 males. For every 100 females age 18 and over, there were 90.6 males.

The median income for a household in the village was $47,256, and the median income for a family was $54,297. Males had a median income of $39,469 versus $28,080 for females. The per capita income for the village was $20,198. About 2.5% of families and 4.4% of the population were below the poverty line, including 4.6% of those under age 18 and 2.4% of those age 65 or over.

== Culture ==
Much of the film The Year That Trembled, starring Jonathan Brandis, Martin Mull, and Fred Willard, was filmed in Garrettsville and nearby Hiram. The film is "a 1970 coming-of-age story set in the shadow of Kent State."

Each summer the village is home to the Garrettsville Summerfest. This annual summer event hosts many attractions including canoe races, a tractor parade, the Garrettsville Idol contest, and a car or cash raffle.

== Education ==
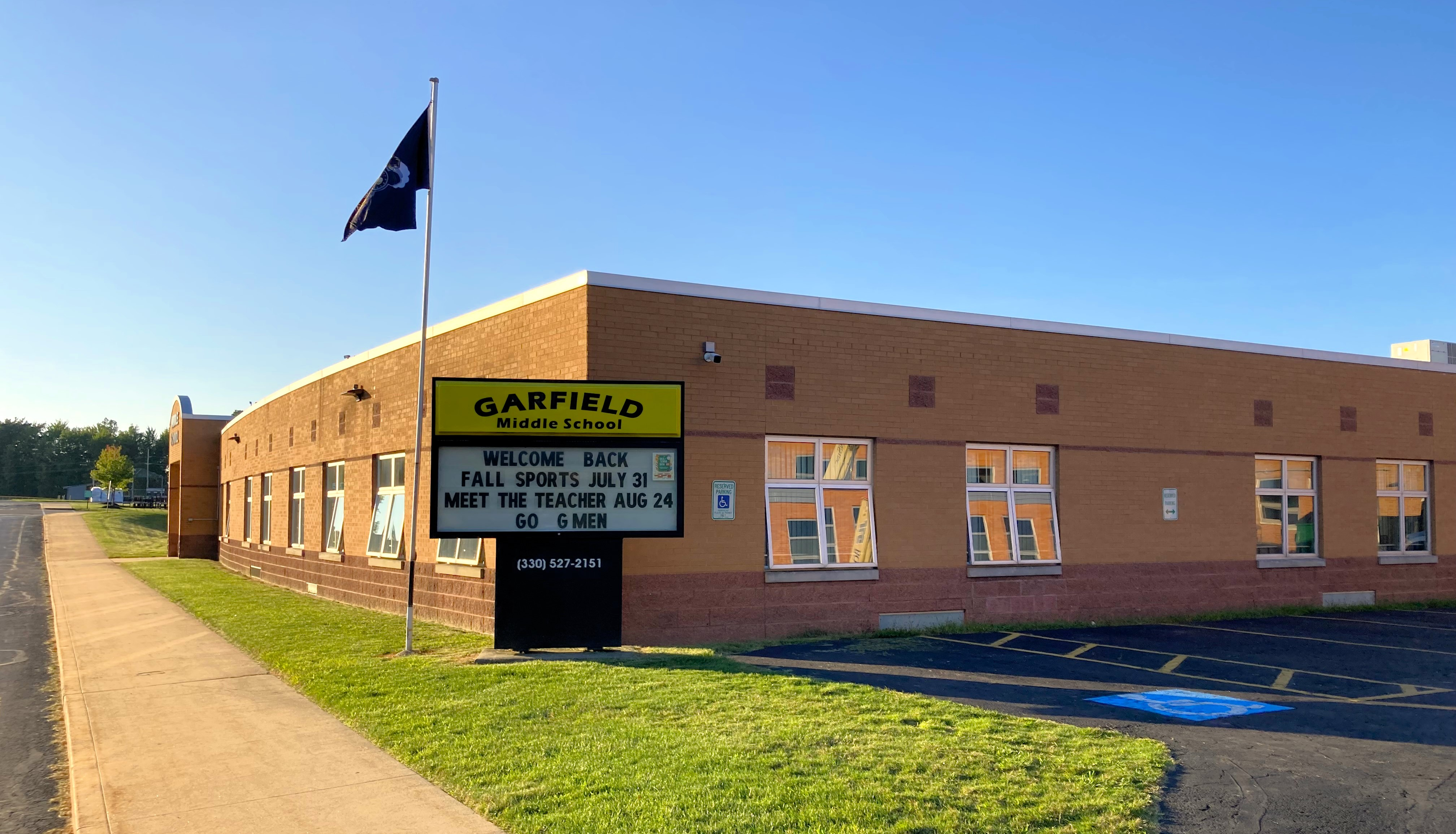
Garfield Middle School

The James A. Garfield Local School District operates one elementary school, one middle school, and James A. Garfield High School.

Garrettsville has a public library, a branch of the Portage County District Library.

== Notable people ==
- Hart Crane, poet
- Lucretia Rudolph Garfield, First Lady
- Jeff Richmond, composer, director, actor
- Allyn Vine, physicist and oceanographer
