= Mantua, Ohio =

Village in Ohio, United States

- Village
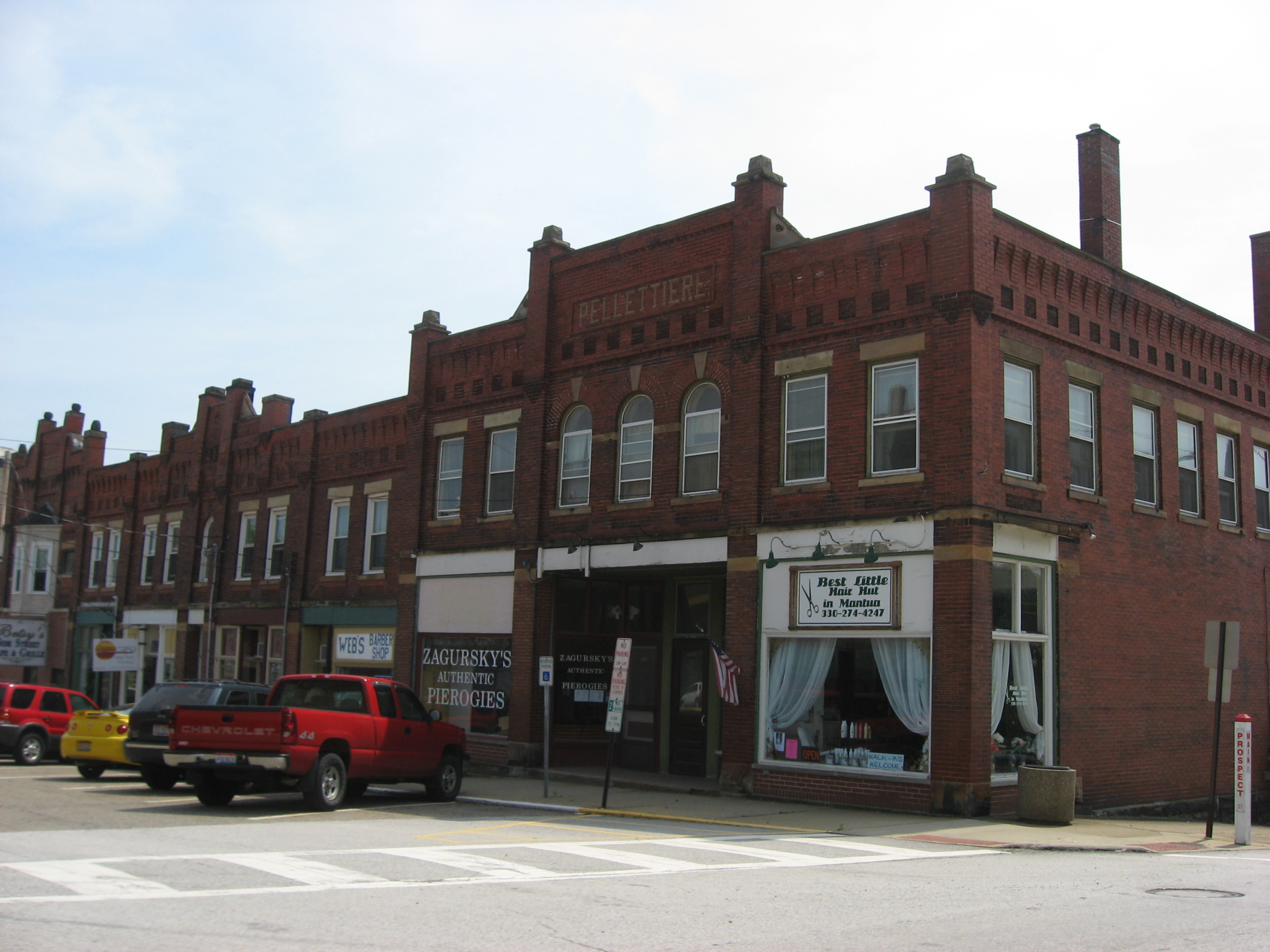
- Businesses in the Mantua Station Brick Commercial District
- Interactive map of Mantua, Ohio
- Location within Ohio Location within the United States
- Coordinates: 41°16′55″N 81°13′21″W
- Country: United States
- State: Ohio
- County: Portage

Area
  - Total: 1.44 sq mi (3.72 km^{2})
  - Land: 1.42 sq mi (3.68 km^{2})
  - Water: 0.015 sq mi (0.04 km^{2})
- Elevation: 1,096 ft (334 m)

Population (2020)
  - Total: 1,001
  - Density: 704.5/sq mi (271.99/km^{2})
- Time zone: UTC-5 (Eastern (EST))
  - Summer (DST): UTC-4 (EDT)
- ZIP code: 44255
- Area code: 330
- FIPS code: 39-47180
- GNIS feature ID: 2399246
- Website: mantuavillage.com

Mantua (/ˈmæn.ə.weɪ/ MAN-ə-way) is a village in northern Portage County, Ohio, United States, along the Cuyahoga River. The population was 1,001 at the 2020 census. It is part of the Akron metropolitan area. It was formed from portions of Mantua Township in the Connecticut Western Reserve.

== History ==
The first settlers came to Mantua Township in 1798. The area that eventually became the village of Mantua was owned by the Tappan family of Ravenna, Ohio. The town was laid out in the 1840s as Mantua Station, a stop on the Cleveland and Mahoning Valley Railroad. It was incorporated as Mantua in 1898. Like the township, the village is named after the Italian city of Mantua, in honor of Napoleon, who had captured it in early 1797 at the end of the Siege of Mantua.

Mantua includes three properties on the National Register of Historic Places: the Horace L. Hine House, the Mantua Station Brick Commercial District, and the William H. Crafts House.

== Geography ==
According to the United States Census Bureau, the village has a total area of 1.42 square miles (3.68 km^{2}), of which 1.40 square miles (3.63 km^{2}) is land and 0.02 square miles (0.05 km^{2}) is water. The Cuyahoga River flows through the southern part of the village.

== Demographics ==
Historical population
Census	Pop.	Note	%±
1880	215		—
1890	676		214.4%
1900	743		9.9%
1910	721		−3.0%
1920	764		6.0%
1930	777		1.7%
1940	870		12.0%
1950	1,059		21.7%
1960	1,194		12.7%
1970	1,199		0.4%
1980	1,041		−13.2%
1990	1,178		13.2%
2000	1,046		−11.2%
2010	1,043		−0.3%
2020	1,001		−4.0%
U.S. Decennial Census

=== 2010 census ===
As of the census of 2010, there were 1,043 people, 451 households, and 267 families living in the village. The population density was 745.0 inhabitants per square mile (287.6/km^{2}). There were 477 housing units at an average density of 340.7 per square mile (131.5/km^{2}). The racial makeup of the village was 98.2% White, 0.3% African American, 0.1% Native American, 0.1% Asian, 0.1% Pacific Islander, and 1.2% from two or more races. Hispanic or Latino of any race were 0.5% of the population.

There were 451 households, of which 29.3% had children under the age of 18 living with them, 40.8% were married couples living together, 14.2% had a female householder with no husband present, 4.2% had a male householder with no wife present, and 40.8% were non-families. 33.7% of all households were made up of individuals, and 12.2% had someone living alone who was 65 years of age or older. The average household size was 2.31 and the average family size was 3.00.

The median age in the village was 41.5 years. 22.8% of residents were under the age of 18; 10.3% were between the ages of 18 and 24; 22.8% were from 25 to 44; 30.7% were from 45 to 64; and 13.3% were 65 years of age or older. The gender makeup of the village was 48.1% male and 51.9% female.

=== 2000 census ===
As of the census of 2000, there were 1,046 people, 440 households, and 278 families living in the village. The population density was 743.4 inhabitants per square mile (287.0/km^{2}). There were 452 housing units at an average density of 321.2 per square mile (124.0/km^{2}). The racial makeup of the village was 98.85% White, 0.29% African American, 0.10% Native American, 0.19% Asian, and 0.57% from two or more races. Hispanic or Latino of any race were 0.57% of the population.

There were 440 households, out of which 28.9% had children under the age of 18 living with them, 49.3% were married couples living together, 9.5% had a female householder with no husband present, and 36.6% were non-families. 29.5% of all households were made up of individuals, and 11.6% had someone living alone who was 65 years of age or older. The average household size was 2.38 and the average family size was 2.96.

In the village, the population was spread out, with 23.3% under the age of 18, 10.5% from 18 to 24, 31.2% from 25 to 44, 22.3% from 45 to 64, and 12.7% who were 65 years of age or older. The median age was 36 years. For every 100 females there were 89.5 males. For every 100 females age 18 and over, there were 92.3 males.

The median income for a household in the village was $49,519, and the median income for a family was $56,125. Males had a median income of $35,288 versus $22,500 for females. The per capita income for the village was $19,472. About 4.9% of families and 3.4% of the population were below the poverty line, including 4.3% of those under age 18 and 1.8% of those age 65 or over.

== Education ==
For public education, Mantua is part of the Crestwood Local School District, which also includes Mantua Township, most of Shalersville Township, the village of Hiram, and western Hiram Township. One of the district's three school facilities, Crestwood High School (grades 7 to 12) and the district offices, which are located in the former middle school building, are located in Mantua while the two elementary-level buildings, Crestwood Intermediate School (grades 3 to 6) and Crestwood Primary School (grades K to 2) are located nearby in Mantua Township.

== Community events ==
Mantua hosts the Potato Festival, a celebration that has occurred annually for over 45 years. The festival features live entertainment, food, rides, a parade, a 15k road race (the Potato Stomp), and varying special attractions. Past special events included the world's largest serving of mashed potatoes and gravy (they were "mashed" in a cement mixer), and Spud Wrestling (mud wrestling in a massive ring full of mashed potatoes).

The Ox Roast is another annual event that is a fund-raiser for the St. Joseph Church.

== Notable people ==
- Jack Lambert, professional football player in the National Football League; born and raised in Mantua
- Brent Simon, musician; resident of Mantua
- Barbara St. Hilaire, video game blogger known as "Old Grandma Hardcore"; resident of Mantua
- William Stanton, author; resident of Mantua for a time
