= Mantua Township, Ohio =

Township in Ohio, US

Mantua Township
- Civil township
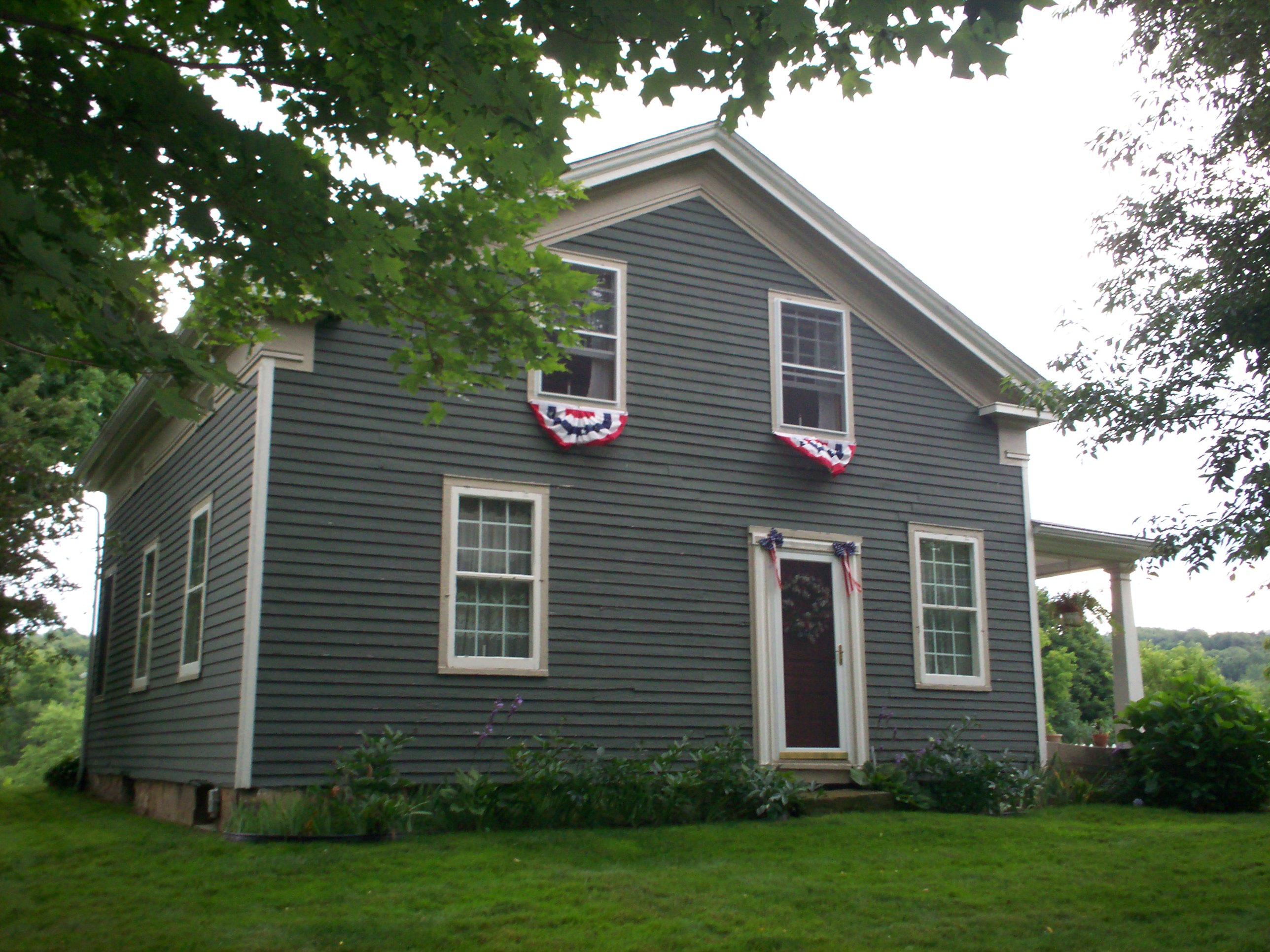
- Historic Snow Home, built in 1815
- Location in the United States
- Coordinates: 41°17′50″N 81°14′36″W
- Country: United States
- State: Ohio
- County: Portage

Area
  - Total: 26.6 sq mi (68.8 km^{2})
  - Land: 26.4 sq mi (68.5 km^{2})
  - Water: 0.077 sq mi (0.2 km^{2})
- Elevation: 1,175 ft (358 m)

Population (2020)
  - Total: 4,576
  - Density: 173/sq mi (66.8/km^{2})
- Time zone: UTC-5 (Eastern (EST))
  - Summer (DST): UTC-4 (EDT)
- ZIP code: 44255
- Area codes: 330, 234
- FIPS code: 39-47194
- GNIS feature ID: 1086831
- Website: Township website

Mantua Township (/ˈmæn.ə.weɪ/, MAN-ə-way) is one of the eighteen townships of Portage County, Ohio, United States. The 2020 census found 4,576 people in the township.

== Name and history ==
Mantua Township was named in commemoration of Mantua, Italy, which in 1796 was besieged by Napoleon, during the Napoleonic Wars.

It is the only Mantua Township statewide.

== Government ==
The township is governed by a three-member board of trustees, who are elected in November of odd-numbered years to a four-year term beginning on the following January 1. Two are elected in the year after the presidential election and one is elected in the year before it. There is also an elected township fiscal officer, who serves a four-year term beginning on April 1 of the year after the election, which is held in November of the year before the presidential election. Vacancies in the fiscal officership or on the board of trustees are filled by the remaining trustees.

== Geography ==
Formed from the Connecticut Western Reserve, Mantua Township covers an area of 26 sq mi (67 km^{2}). It is located in the northern part of Portage county and borders the following townships and cities:

- Auburn Township, Geauga County - north
- Troy Township, Geauga County - northeast corner
- Hiram Township - east
- Freedom Township - southeast corner
- Shalersville Township - south
- Streetsboro - southwest corner
- Aurora - west
- Bainbridge Township, Geauga County - northwest corner

The village of Mantua, which became independent of the township in 1993, is located in what was previously southern Mantua Township and borders the township on three sides.

Mantua Bog State Nature Preserve and Marsh Wetlands State Nature Preserve, are located east of Mantua. Both are part of the Mantua Swamp region which was designated as a National Natural Landmark in 1976.

== Notable people ==
- Eliza Roxcy Snow Smith, an early Latter Day Saint leader, and a plural wife of both Joseph Smith and Brigham Young
- Lorenzo Snow, a former president of the Church of Jesus Christ of Latter-day Saints. The community of Mantua, Utah, in Utah's Box Elder County, was named in honor of Snow and his hometown.
- Emerson E. White, educator and third president of Purdue University, born in Mantua Township
