= Shalersville Township, Portage County, Ohio =

Township in Ohio, US

Shalersville Township
- Civil township
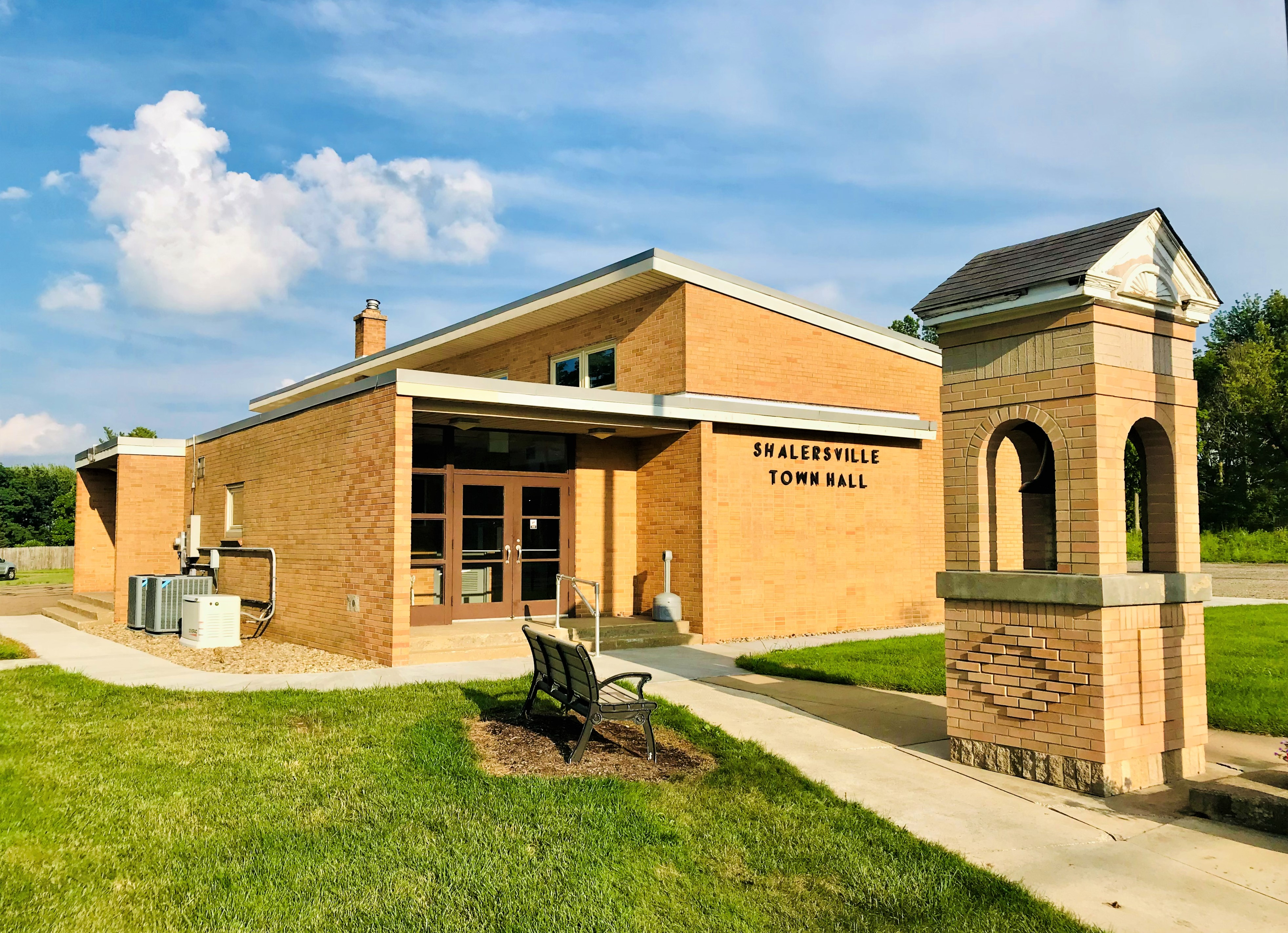
- Shalersville Town Hall

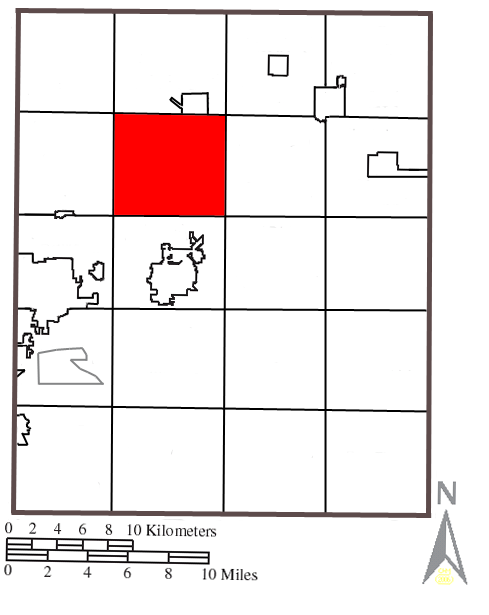
- Location within Portage County
- Coordinates: 41°14′44″N 81°15′37″W
- Country: United States
- State: Ohio
- County: Portage

Area
  - Total: 27.6 sq mi (71.5 km^{2})
  - Land: 27.5 sq mi (71.3 km^{2})
  - Water: 0.077 sq mi (0.2 km^{2})
- Elevation: 1,119 ft (341 m)

Population (2020)
  - Total: 5,245
  - Density: 191/sq mi (73.6/km^{2})
- Time zone: UTC-5 (Eastern (EST))
  - Summer (DST): UTC-4 (EDT)
- ZIP code: 44255, 44266, 44241
- Area codes: 330, 234
- FIPS code: 39-71731
- GNIS feature ID: 1086839
- Website: Township website

Shalersville Township is one of the eighteen townships of Portage County, Ohio, United States. The 2020 census found 5,245 people in the township.

== Geography ==
Located in the northwestern part of the county, it borders the following other townships and cities:

- Mantua Township - north
- Hiram Township - northeast corner
- Freedom Township - east
- Charlestown Township - southeast corner
- Ravenna Township - south
- Franklin Township - southwest corner
- Streetsboro - west
- Aurora - northwest corner

No municipalities are located in Shalersville Township.

Formed from the Connecticut Western Reserve, Shalersville Township covers an area of 28 sq mi (73 km^{2}).

== Historic population figures ==
- 1960—2,823
- 1970—4,967
- 1980—5,268
- 1990—5,270
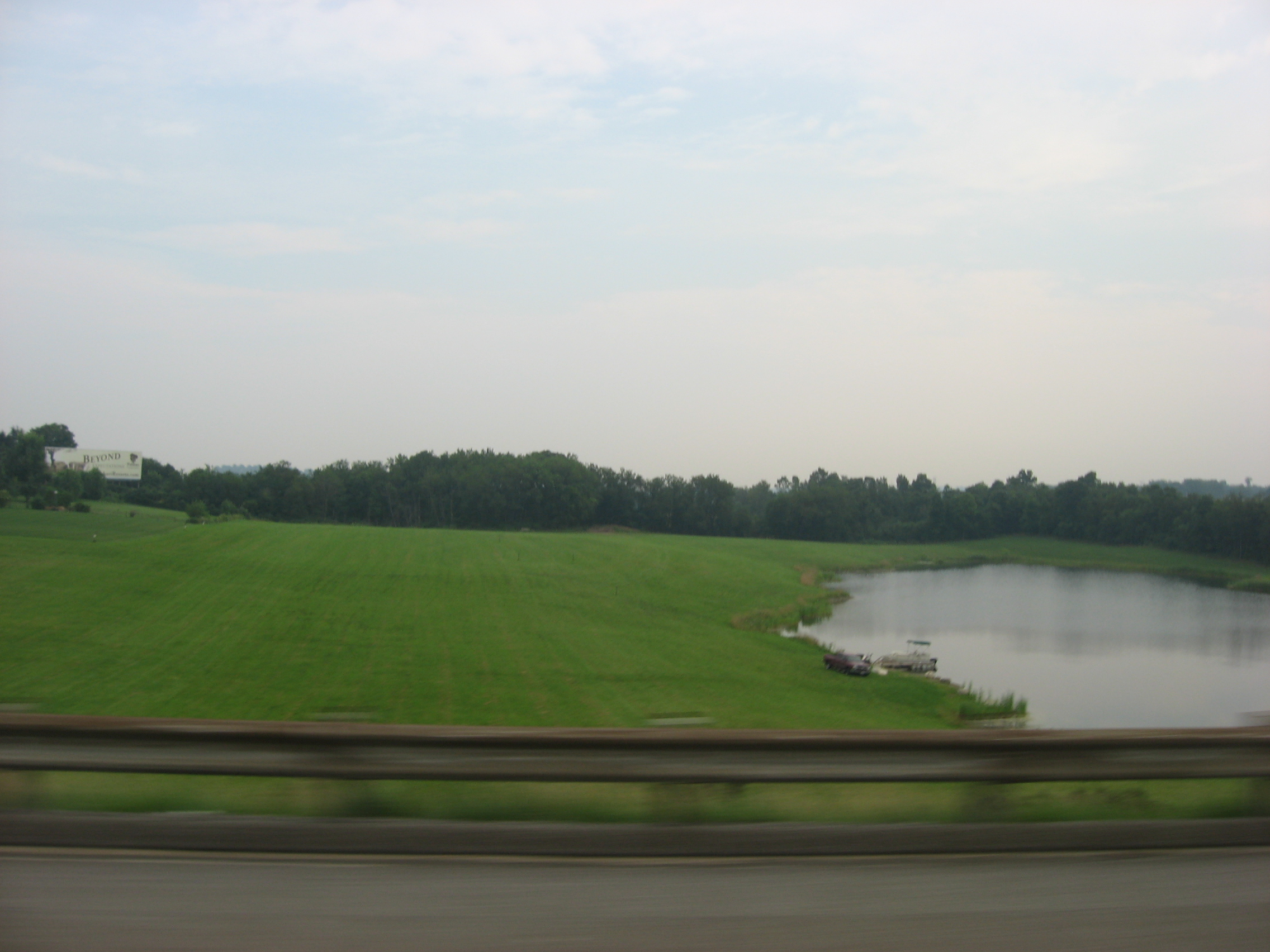
- Countryside in Shalersville Township
  2000—5,976
- 2010—5,670

== Name and history ==
Shalersville takes its name from its original proprietor, General Nathaniel Shaler and was originally known as "Middletown" as Shaler was a native of Middletown, Connecticut. It is the only Shalersville Township statewide. The first settlers, the family of Joel Baker of Tolland County, Connecticut, arrived in 1806 and the township government was organized in 1812. The township was formed from town 4, range 8 of the Connecticut Western Reserve. A post office called Shalersville was established in 1824, and remained in operation until 1904.

== Government ==
The township is governed by a three-member board of trustees, who are elected in November of odd-numbered years to a four-year term beginning on the following January 1. Two are elected in the year after the presidential election and one is elected in the year before it. There is also an elected township fiscal officer, who serves a four-year term beginning on April 1 of the year after the election, which is held in November of the year before the presidential election. Vacancies in the fiscal officership or on the board of trustees are filled by the remaining trustees.

== Transportation ==
Ohio State Routes 303 and 44 pass through Shalersville and intersect at the middle of the township. The Ohio Turnpike also cuts through Shalersville, and in the 1990s the exit at State Route 44 was added. The Portage County Airport is located in the southern part of the township.

== Notable residents ==
- Bernie Kosar, former Cleveland Browns quarterback
