= Hiram Township, Portage County, Ohio =

Township in Ohio, US

Hiram Township
- Civil township
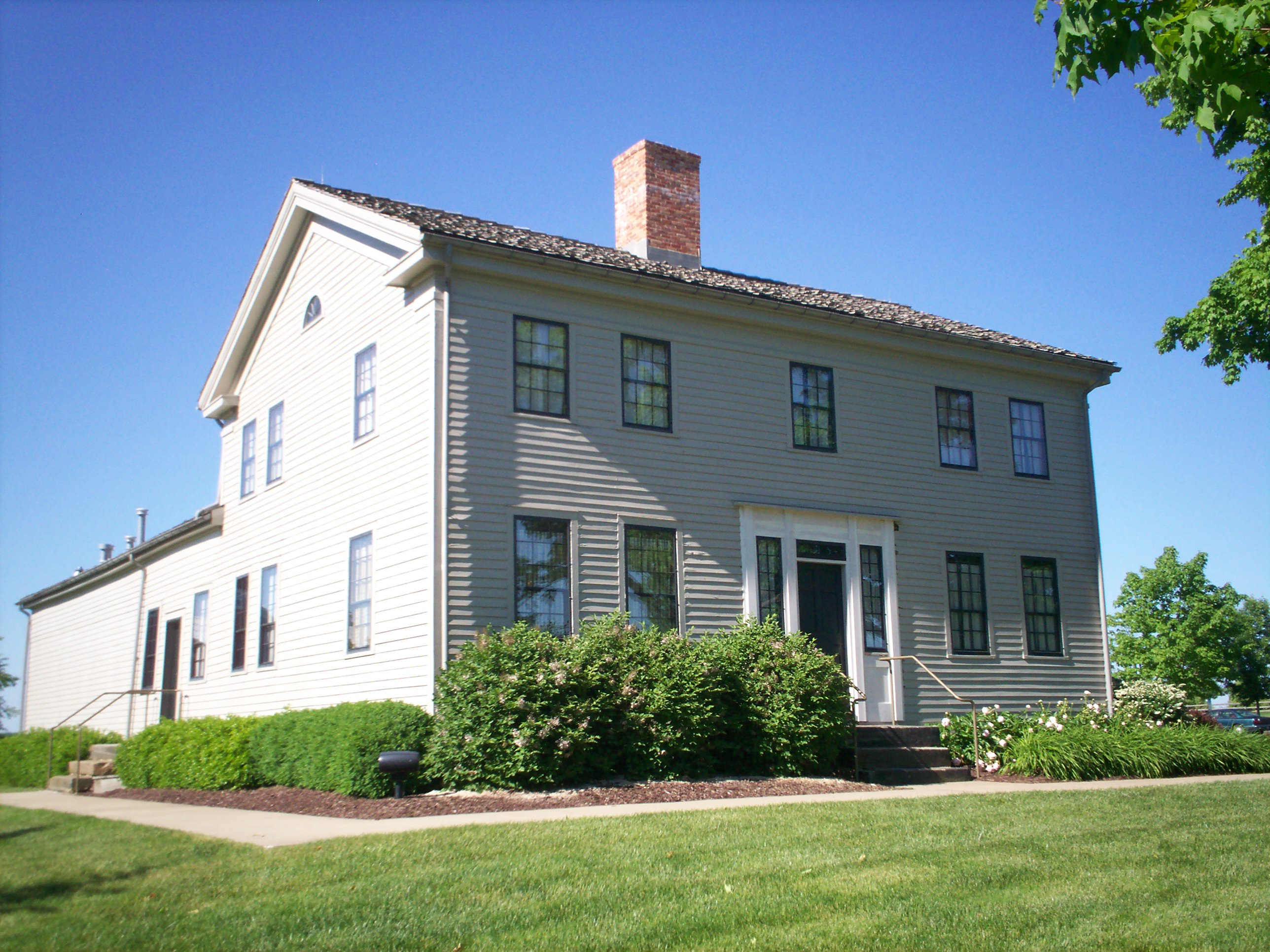
- Historic John Johnson Home
- Interactive map of Hiram Township
- Coordinates: 41°18′9″N 81°8′55″W
- Country: United States
- State: Ohio
- County: Portage

Area
  - Total: 23.2 sq mi (60 km^{2})
  - Land: 23.2 sq mi (60 km^{2})
  - Water: 0.0 sq mi (0 km^{2})
- Elevation: 1,237 ft (377 m)

Population (2020)
  - Total: 2,396
  - Density: 103.3/sq mi (39.9/km^{2})
- Time zone: UTC-5 (Eastern (EST))
  - Summer (DST): UTC-4 (EDT)
- ZIP code: 44234
- Area code: 330
- FIPS code: 39-35672
- GNIS feature ID: 1086830

Hiram Township is one of the eighteen townships of Portage County, Ohio, United States. The 2020 census listed 2,396 people in the township.

== Geography ==
Located in the northern part of the county, it borders the following other townships:

- Troy Township, Geauga County - north
- Parkman Township, Geauga County - northwest corner
- Nelson Township - east
- Freedom Township - south
- Shalersville Township - southwest corner
- Mantua Township - west
- Auburn Township, Geauga County - northwest corner

Two villages are formed from portions of Hiram Township: part of Garrettsville in the southeast, and Hiram in the center. According to the website of Hiram Township, the portion of Hiram Township once adjoining Windham Township is no longer a part of Hiram Township, having been annexed by the village of Garrettsville.

Formed from the Connecticut Western Reserve, Hiram Township covers an area of 23 sq mi (60 km^{2}).

== Name and history ==
Hiram Township was named after Hiram I, the biblical king of Tyre. It is the only Hiram Township statewide.

A small hamlet called Hiram Rapids was located in the northwest part of the township. A post office was established there in 1840, and remained in operation until 1912.

=== Johnson Farm ===
John and Elsa Johnson moved their family from Vermont to Hiram Township in 1818 and purchased land for farming. In February 1831, after son Lyman joined the Latter Day Saint movement, the Johnsons read the Book of Mormon and traveled to Kirtland to meet with Latter Day Saint movement founder Joseph Smith. The Johnsons invited Smith to live with them, and Smith made the Johnson farm his residence and the temporary headquarters of the Church of Christ from September 1831 to March 1832.

Several other apostles and notables of the early Latter Day Saint movement resided or were frequent guests at the Johnson Farm. Among these were John Johnson's sons, Luke and Lyman; as well as Sidney Rigdon and Orson Hyde. Section 76 of the Doctrine and Covenants was received at the Johnson Farm on February 16, 1832. The Church of Jesus Christ of Latter-day Saints (LDS Church) holds that several other revelations were received at the Johnson Farm, and that Smith worked on translating the Bible here.

The LDS Church acquired the original Johnson property in 1956 and has operated it as a historic site open to tours since then. From 1971 to 2002 the farm property was also used to support the church's Welfare Services department through the growth and harvesting of strawberries and apples. The home was restored to its 1830s appearance in 2001.

== Government ==
The township is governed by a three-member board of trustees, who are elected in November of odd-numbered years to a four-year term beginning on the following January 1. Two are elected in the year after the presidential election and one is elected in the year before it. There is also an elected township fiscal officer, who serves a four-year term beginning on April 1 of the year after the election, which is held in November of the year before the presidential election. Vacancies in the fiscal officership or on the board of trustees are filled by the remaining trustees.

== Notable people ==
- Bridget Franek, 2012 United States Olympic athlete in 3000 meter steeplechase, grew up in the township
- John Johnson, early leader in the Latter Day Saint movement and owner of the John Johnson Farm; lived in the township from 1818 to 1833
- Luke Johnson, early leader in the Latter Day Saint movement and son of John Johnson; raised in Hiram Township
- Lyman Johnson, early leader in the Latter Day Saint movement and son of John Johnson; raised in Hiram Township
- Sidney Rigdon, early leader in the Latter Day Saint movement, lived in the township from 1831 to 1832 near the John Johnson Farm
- Joseph Smith, founder of the Latter Day Saint movement, lived in Hiram Township from 1831 to 1832 at the John Johnson Farm
